= El Oro Province =

Province of Ecuador

Coordinates: 3.26667°S 79.9667°W

El Oro Provincia de El Oro
- Province
- Province of El Oro
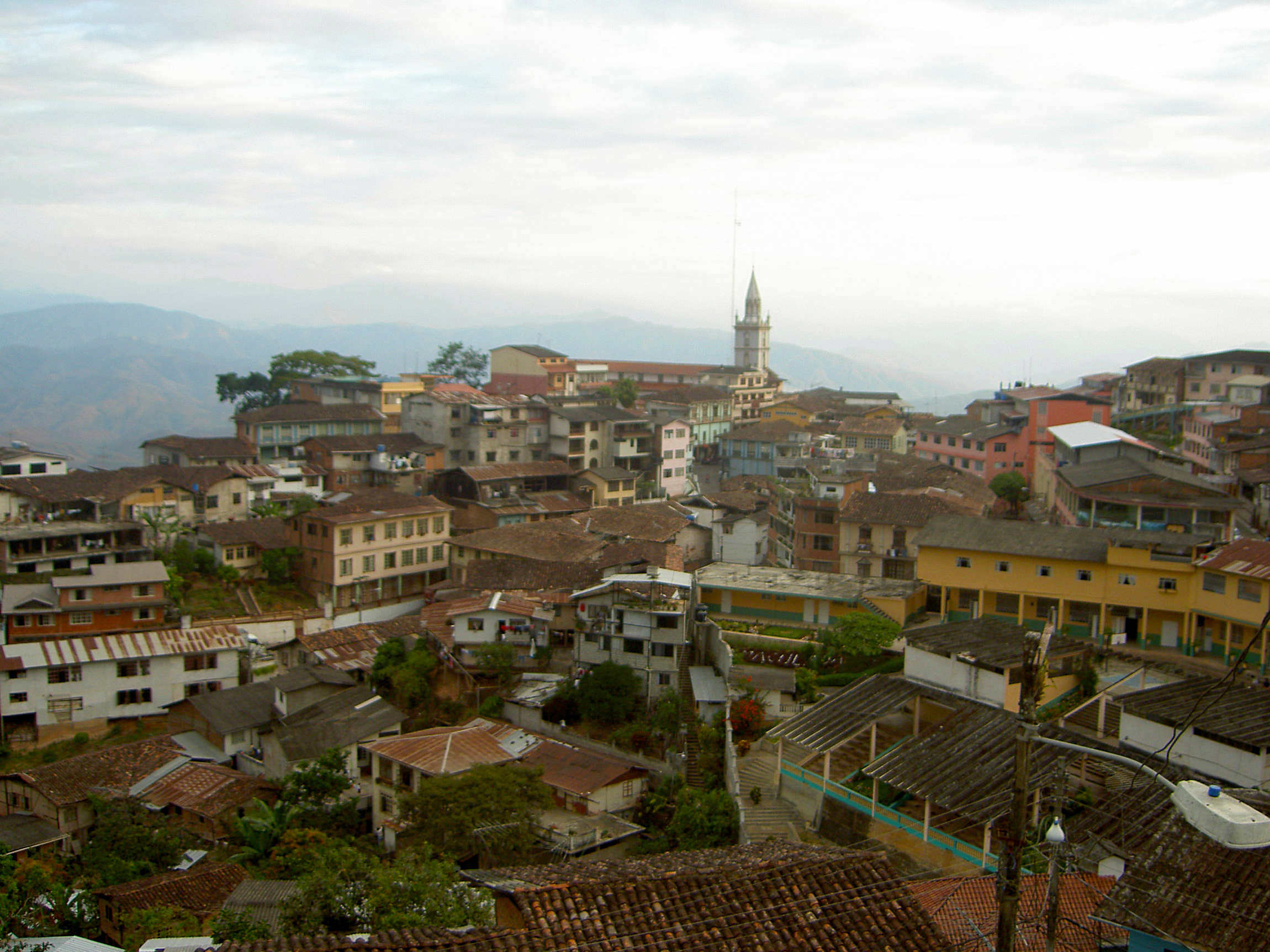
- Zaruma

- Flag

- Cantons of El Oro Province
- Country: Ecuador
- Established: April 23, 1884
- Capital: Machala

Government
  - Prefect: Clemente Bravo (SUR)
  - Vice Prefect: Karina Torres
  - Governor: Jimmy Blacio Ochoa

Area
  - Total: 5,873 km^{2} (2,268 sq mi)
- Highest elevation: 3,590 m (11,780 ft)
- Lowest elevation: 0 m (0 ft)

Population (2022 census)
  - Total: 714,592
  - Density: 121.7/km^{2} (315.1/sq mi)
  - Population 2001: 539,888
- Time zone: UTC-5 (ECT)
- Postal code: EC07xxxx
- Area code: 07
- Vehicle registration: O
- HDI (2017): 0.755 high · 6th
- Website: www.eloro.gob.ec

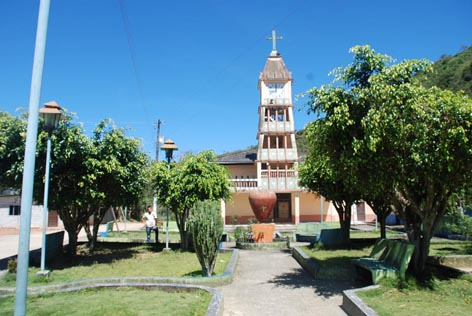
Iglesia Parque Apartadero

El Oro (Spanish pronunciation: [el ˈoɾo]; oro = gold) is the southernmost of Ecuador's coastal provinces. It was named for its historically important gold production. Today it is one of the world's major exporters of bananas. The capital is Machala.

== History ==
The area was settled by the Inca, who inhabited the area at the time Spanish settlement began in 1549. The Spanish found and looted gold there and mined it, carrying the gold to Spain. The province was named for its historically important gold production.

The gold was mined by Indigenous slaves held captive by the Spanish mainly in the late 16th and 17th centuries in the village of Zaruma in the Zaruma Canton. The earthquake of January 1749 destroyed the mining area. A local rebellion stopped the mining until the Spanish agreed to allow the native people to benefit from the mining. Spain imported gold from the area until the area gained its independence from Spain in 1820.

Philip II of Spain granted the village the title of "Villa de Sant Antonio del Zerro de Oro de Zaruma".

After 1820, Ecuador emerged as an independent nation, as neighboring areas to Zaruma also declared their independence. In 1882, the province of El Oro was formed by the villages of Zaruma, Machala and Santa Rosa, with Zaruma as its capital, and the area's gold mining as the reason for the name of the province. Two years later, the capital of the province was moved to Machala. Gold mining continued under various mining companies, which now paid taxes to the government for the gold they mined.

As gold mining fell in value, El Oro province became the major area of banana production in Ecuador.

Peru invaded and occupied most of El Oro province during the Ecuadorian–Peruvian War of 1941.

== Geography ==
To the north and east the province has borders with the provinces Guayas, Azuay and Loja. To the west and south it is limited by the Pacific Ocean and the Peruvian Tumbes Region.

The province is divided in 14 cantons and features a wide range of attractions, such as the Jambelí Islands, the petrified forest of the Puyango River, and the island of Santa Clara, to name a few.

== Demographics ==
Around 715,751 people live in the orense territory, according to the demographic projection of the INEC for 2020, being the sixth most populated province in the country. The Province of El Oro is made up of 14 cantons, from which their respective urban and rural parishes are derived. According to the latest territorial ordinance, the province of El Oro will belong to a region also included by the provinces of Loja and Zamora Chinchipe, although it is not officially formed, called the South Region.

- Population 1990: 412,572
- Population 2000: 525,763
- Population 2010: 600,659

Ethnic groups as of the Ecuadorian census of 2010:

- Mestizo 81.6%
- White 7.8%
- Afro-Ecuadorian 6.9%
- Montubio 2.8%
- Indigenous 0.7%
- Other 0.3%

== Economy ==
El Oro economy is mainly based on export of banana and shrimp. Other agricultural products of importance are cacao and coffee.

== Cantons ==
The province is divided into 14 cantons. The following table lists each with its population at the 2001 census, its area in square kilometres (km^{2}), and the name of the canton seat or capital.

Canton	Pop. (2019)	Area (km^{2})	Seat/Capital
Arenillas	32,920	803	Arenillas
Atahualpa	6,410	278	Paccha
Balsas	9,010	69	Balsas
Chilla	2,410	328	Chilla
El Guabo	62,460	603	El Guabo
Huaquillas	59,420	72	Huaquillas
Las Lajas	4,980	297	La Victoria
Machala	286,120	338	Machala
Marcabelí	6,210	147	Marcabelí
Pasaje	86,580	452	Pasaje
Piñas	29,930	615	Piñas
Portovelo	13,910	282	Portovelo
Santa Rosa	81,210	889	Santa Rosa
Zaruma	25,650	645	Zaruma

== See also ==
- Provinces of Ecuador
- Cantons of Ecuador
