= Guachapala Canton =

- Canton
- Location of Azuay Province in Ecuador.

- Guachapala Canton in Azuay Province
- Coordinates: 2.769°S 78.709°W
- Country: Ecuador
- Province: Azuay Province
- Time zone: UTC-5 (ECT)

Guachapala is a canton in the province of Azuay, Ecuador, was created in the presidency of the Architect Sixto Durán Ballén according to the Supplement to Official Gazette No. 623 of January 31, 1995. According to the last census conducted by the INEC, its population is approximately 3409 people, is famous for the religious shrine of Lord Andacocha, so many tourists get religious.

== Demographics ==
Ethnic groups as of the Ecuadorian census of 2010:

- Mestizo 95.6%
- White 2.4%
- Afro-Ecuadorian 1.6%
- Indigenous 0.3%
- Montubio 0.1%
- Other 0.0%

== History ==
The idea that Guachapala, is elevated to Canton, goes back to the decade of the seventies, in which members of the vestry, together with the Directors of the Central School of the population. Has the first meeting for this purpose, agreeing find the main requirements to start this project.

Subsequently, at the age of 90, knowing that the neighboring parishes of Bread and Sevilla de Oro, were promoting projects to National Congress of Ecuador (by that name at that time), for the category of Canton, Mr. Gilberto Castillo (a member of the Vestry of the time), enlist Bosco Abdon Orellana Castillo, which asks the Internal Boundary Commission of the Republic, CELIR, bases for the implementation of a project Cantonización, the same as are obtained with these documents Vestry decides to make a General Assembly on December 30, 1991, date in which people mostly attend who decided start the process, and is named for that Finally a committee "Pro-Cantonización", the same as a majority decision is chaired by Dr. Jaime Mayor Bosco Jerves Jerves and Orellana Castillo General Coordinate and vice-chairman.

He immediately appointed committees to prepare a monograph, a pro forma budget outline, which will show the ability of self-organization and how would the town, the population survey, the census of the inhabitants and hamlets; material that is collected and tabulated in the following months, can enter Guachapala Monograph together with the petition, the Honorable Provincial Council of Azuay, who subsequently received a favorable opinion by Crafts No. 2543, of June 1, 1992, with this approval refers to CELIR Project and the National Congress on 12 June 1992. Since then, it has been the hard work of the various committees formed, until the enactment of the act establishing the Guachapala Canton, in the Supplement to Official Gazette No. 623, of January 31, 1995. In the presidency of Sixto Duran Ballen Arq.

== Limits ==
The canton Guachapala limited to:

North: With the Rio Paute which separates it from the parishes and Dugdug Tomebamba.

South: In Canton Gualaceo

This: With the Canton El Pan and Sevilla gold

West: With the Rio Paute and Canton Advertise

== Surface ==
Guachapala has an area of 41.07 km2. Representing 2.12% of the surface of the north-eastern counties of the Azuay Province and 0.5% of the province so it is smaller in area.

== Climate ==
In the canton Guachapala, warm temperate climate prevails for the influence of the Eastern Region. It has an average temperature of 17 degrees Celsius.

== Height ==
Its location relative to sea level varies from 2,200 to 3,280 meters above sea level.

== Precipitation ==
It has an average rainfall of 500 mm per year, with the months of April and October the most llubiosos and December and January the driest. There is a relative humidity of 83%. The water balance is between-200a +700 mm per year.

== Political Division ==
The canton Guachapala has one urban parish, but is composed of the following villages, the principales are: Don Julo, Chaullayacu, Ñuñurco, Sacre, Guablid, Guásag, Andacocha, San Pedro, Chicti, Párig and Agllán.
