= Santa Lucía Canton =

Coordinates: 1°42′50″S 79°59′06″W

- Canton
- Flag

- Location in Guayas Province
- Country: Ecuador
- Province: Guayas Province

Population (2010)
  - Total: 38,923
- Time zone: UTC-5 (ECT)

Santa Lucía Canton is a canton of Ecuador, located in Guayas Province. Its capital is the town of Santa Lucía. Its population at the 2001 census was 33,868.

== Demographics ==
Ethnic groups as of the Ecuadorian census of 2010:

- Montubio 57.2%
- Mestizo 35.9%
- Afro-Ecuadorian 4.1%
- White 2.5%
- Indigenous 0.2%
- Other 0.1%
