= Jipijapa Canton =

Coordinates: 1.33333°S 80.5833°W

- Canton
- Flag

- Location of Manabí Province in Ecuador.

- Jipijapa Canton in Manabí Province
- Country: Ecuador
- Province: Manabí Province

Government
  - Mayor: Ángela Plúa
- Time zone: UTC-5 (ECT)

Jipijapa Canton is a canton of Ecuador, located in the Manabí Province. Its capital is the town of Jipijapa. Its population at the 2001 census was 65,796.

== Demographics ==
Ethnic groups as of the Ecuadorian census of 2010:

- Mestizo 73.5%
- Montubio 18.6%
- Afro-Ecuadorian 5.2%
- White 2.4%
- Indigenous 0.1%
- Other 0.2%

== Climate ==
Climate data for Jipijapa (La Naranja), elevation 528 m (1,732 ft), (1961–1990)
Month	Jan	Feb	Mar	Apr	May	Jun	Jul	Aug	Sep	Oct	Nov	Dec	Year
Mean daily maximum °C (°F)	27.7 (81.9)	27.6 (81.7)	28.0 (82.4)	28.2 (82.8)	27.3 (81.1)	26.2 (79.2)	26.2 (79.2)	27.3 (81.1)	28.2 (82.8)	28.2 (82.8)	27.7 (81.9)	28.2 (82.8)	27.6 (81.6)
Daily mean °C (°F)	22.2 (72.0)	22.2 (72.0)	22.6 (72.7)	22.5 (72.5)	22.2 (72.0)	21.2 (70.2)	21.1 (70.0)	21.0 (69.8)	21.1 (70.0)	21.2 (70.2)	21.2 (70.2)	21.7 (71.1)	21.7 (71.1)
Mean daily minimum °C (°F)	19.2 (66.6)	19.6 (67.3)	19.7 (67.5)	19.6 (67.3)	19.0 (66.2)	18.3 (64.9)	17.7 (63.9)	17.3 (63.1)	17.6 (63.7)	17.6 (63.7)	17.6 (63.7)	18.2 (64.8)	18.5 (65.2)
Average precipitation mm (inches)	173.0 (6.81)	236.0 (9.29)	333.0 (13.11)	204.0 (8.03)	108.0 (4.25)	58.0 (2.28)	14.0 (0.55)	10.0 (0.39)	11.0 (0.43)	6.0 (0.24)	6.0 (0.24)	24.0 (0.94)	1,183 (46.56)
Source: FAO
