= Pucará Canton =

- Canton
- Flag

- Location of Azuay Province in Ecuador.

- Pucará Canton in Azuay Province
- Coordinates: 3°10′45″S 79°31′45″W
- Country: Ecuador
- Province: Azuay Province
- Time zone: UTC-5 (ECT)

Pucará Canton is a canton of Ecuador, located in the Azuay Province. Its capital is the town of Pucará. Its population at the 2001 census was 20,382.

== Demographics ==
Ethnic groups as of the Ecuadorian census of 2010:

- Mestizo 93.5%
- White 3.9%
- Afro-Ecuadorian 1.3%
- Indigenous 1.0%
- Montubio 0.2%
- Other 0.1%
