= Sucre Canton =

- Canton
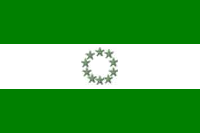
- Flag

- Location of Manabí Province in Ecuador.

- Sucre Canton in Manabí Province
- Coordinates: 0°36′0″S 80°25′0″W
- Country: Ecuador
- Province: Manabí Province

Area
  - Total: 693.5 km^{2} (267.8 sq mi)

Population (2022 census)
  - Total: 62,841
  - Density: 90.61/km^{2} (234.7/sq mi)
- Time zone: UTC-5 (ECT)

Sucre Canton is a canton of Ecuador, located in the Manabí Province. Its capital is the city of Bahía de Caráquez. Its population at the 2001 census was 52,158. The canton owes its name to Marshal Antonio José de Sucre.

== Extension and limits ==
Sucre has an area of 764 km² and its limits are:

- To the North with the Canton of San Vicente.
- To the south with the cantons of Portoviejo and Rocafuerte.
- To the east with the cantons of Tosagua and Rocafuerte.
- To the west with the Pacific Ocean.
- The parish of San Isidro is separated from the rest of the canton by the canton of San Vicente.

The canton is divided into an exclave by the San Vicente Canton.

== Political Division ==
Sucre is divided into four parishes:

- Urban Parishes
  - Bay of Caráquez
  - Leonidas Plaza Gutiérrez
- Rural Parishes
  - Charapotó
  - San Isidro

== Demographics ==
Ethnic groups as of the Ecuadorian census of 2010:

- Mestizo 78.8%
- Montubio 9.2%
- Afro-Ecuadorian 7.0%
- White 4.5%
- Indigenous 0.1%
- Other 0.4%

== See also ==
- Antonio José de Sucre
- Sucre, Manabí
