= Santa Isabel Canton =

Coordinates: 3.27417°S 79.3156°W

- Canton
- Location of Azuay Province in Ecuador.

- Santa Isabel Canton in Azuay Province
- Country: Ecuador
- Province: Azuay Province
- Time zone: UTC-5 (ECT)

Santa Isabel Canton is a canton of Ecuador, located in the Azuay Province. Its capital is the town of Santa Isabel. Its population at the 2001 census was 18,015.

== Demographics ==
Ethnic groups as of the Ecuadorian census of 2010:

- Mestizo 92.5%
- White 4.4%
- Afro-Ecuadorian 2.2%
- Indigenous 0.5%
- Montubio 0.2%
- Other 0.2%

== Climate ==
Climate data for Santa Isabel, elevation 1,598 m (5,243 ft), (1971–2000)
Month	Jan	Feb	Mar	Apr	May	Jun	Jul	Aug	Sep	Oct	Nov	Dec	Year
Mean daily maximum °C (°F)	24.6 (76.3)	24.7 (76.5)	24.6 (76.3)	25.1 (77.2)	26.2 (79.2)	26.4 (79.5)	27.5 (81.5)	27.3 (81.1)	27.6 (81.7)	27.0 (80.6)	26.6 (79.9)	25.5 (77.9)	26.1 (79.0)
Mean daily minimum °C (°F)	14.4 (57.9)	14.5 (58.1)	14.3 (57.7)	15.0 (59.0)	14.9 (58.8)	14.7 (58.5)	15.0 (59.0)	15.2 (59.4)	14.5 (58.1)	14.6 (58.3)	14.5 (58.1)	14.9 (58.8)	14.7 (58.5)
Average precipitation mm (inches)	56.0 (2.20)	67.0 (2.64)	106.0 (4.17)	79.0 (3.11)	43.0 (1.69)	18.0 (0.71)	5.0 (0.20)	9.0 (0.35)	17.0 (0.67)	15.0 (0.59)	17.0 (0.67)	38.0 (1.50)	470 (18.5)
Average relative humidity (%)	79	82	81	81	77	73	67	66	67	72	72	74	74
Source: FAO
