= Oña Canton =

- Canton
- Flag

- Location of Azuay Province in Ecuador.

- Oña Canton in Azuay Province
- Coordinates: 3.46964°S 79.15431°W
- Country: Ecuador
- Province: Azuay Province
- Time zone: UTC-5 (ECT)

Oña Canton is a canton of Ecuador, located in the Azuay Province. Its capital is the town of Oña, Ecuador. Its population at the 2001 census was 3,231.

== Demographics ==
Ethnic groups as of the Ecuadorian census of 2010:

- Mestizo 93.0%
- Indigenous 3.6%
- White 2.2%
- Afro-Ecuadorian 1.0%
- Montubio 0.2%
- Other 0.1%

== Archaeology ==
In the 21st century, archaeologists investigated the Cubilan area, in Ona Canton, Provincia de Azuay. The Cubilan area covers about 52 km2 between Loja and Azuay Provinces.

23 archaeological localities have been identified by previous studies in this area. Lithic workshops or camp sites of hunter-gatherer societies occupied the region by 12,700 to 9900 cal. BP. The early studies were done by Mathilde Temme.

Recent microbotanical studies from Cubilan recovered maize starches from milling and scrapping lithic tools associated with contexts dated to 8078-7959 cal. BP (about 6,000 BC). This is the oldest evidence of maize in South American highlands.

Other food plants such as manioc, chili pepper, and wild yam were also identified.

Recent data has suggested that humans dispersed maize into the upper lowland of northwest Colombia at some time within a date range of 8997-8277 cal. BP. Later, human groups dispersed maize into the mid-elevation forests of the Colombian Andes by 8000-7600 cal. BP. For the coastal lowlands of Ecuador (Las Vegas), the recent dates for maize are at c. 8053-7818 cal. BP.

== See also ==
- Las Vegas culture (archaeology)
