= Salitre Canton =

- Canton
- Flag

- Location of Guayas in Ecuador.

- Cantons of Guayas Province
- Coordinates: 1°49′46″S 79°48′56″W
- Country: Ecuador
- Province: Guayas Province
- Time zone: UTC-5 (ECT)

Salitre Canton is a canton of Ecuador, located in the Guayas Province. Its capital is the town of Salitre. Its population at the 2001 census was 50,379.

== Demographics ==
Ethnic groups as of the Ecuadorian census of 2010:

- Montubio 79.5%
- Mestizo 15.9%
- Afro-Ecuadorian 2.6%
- White 1.8%
- Indigenous 0.1%
- Other 0.1%
