= El Pan Canton =

Coordinates: 2°47′10″S 78°39′54″W

- Canton
- Flag

- Location of Azuay Province in Ecuador.

- El Pan Canton in Azuay Province
- Country: Ecuador
- Province: Azuay Province
- Time zone: UTC-5 (ECT)

El Pan Canton is a canton of Ecuador, located in the Azuay Province. Its capital is the town of El Pan. Its population at the 2001 census was 3,075.

== Demographics ==
Ethnic groups as of the Ecuadorian census of 2010:

- Mestizo 92.5%
- White 5.8%
- Afro-Ecuadorian 1.4%
- Montubio 0.3%
- Indigenous 0.0%
- Other 0.1%
