= Girón Canton =

- Canton
- Location of Azuay Province in Ecuador.

- Girón Canton in Azuay Province
- Coordinates: 3.159028°S 79.147568°W
- Country: Ecuador
- Province: Azuay Province
- Capital: Girón

Area
  - Total: 342.4 km^{2} (132.2 sq mi)

Population (2022 census)
  - Total: 12,182
  - Density: 35.58/km^{2} (92.15/sq mi)
- Time zone: UTC-5 (ECT)

Girón Canton is a canton of Ecuador, located in the Azuay Province. Its capital is the town of Girón. Its population at the 2001 census was 12,583 .

== Demographics ==
Ethnic groups as of the Ecuadorian census of 2010:

- Mestizo 94.7%
- White 2.9%
- Afro-Ecuadorian 1.5%
- Indigenous 0.6%
- Montubio 0.3%
- Other 0.1%
