= Paute Canton =

- Canton
- Flag

- Location of Azuay Province in Ecuador.

- Paute Canton in Azuay Province
- Coordinates: 2.7818°S 78.7600°W
- Country: Ecuador
- Province: Azuay Province
- Established: 1860

Government
  - Mayor: Raul Delgado

Population (2010)
  - Total: 25,494
- Time zone: UTC-5 (ECT)
- Website: www.paute.gob.ec

Paute Canton is a canton of Ecuador, located in the Azuay Province. It was established on February 26, 1860. Its capital is the town of Paute. It has a population of 25,494 as per the 2010 census. Its current mayor is Raul Delgado and Freddy Gonzales as vice-mayor.

== Etymology ==
Paute translates to 'stone' in the long-extinct Cañari language, once spoken throughout Azuay Province.

== Demographics ==
Ethnic groups as of the Ecuadorian census of 2010:

- Mestizo 92.2%
- White 4.3%
- Afro-Ecuadorian 2.4%
- Indigenous 0.7%
- Montubio 0.3%
- Other 0.2%

== Climate ==
Climate data for Paute, elevation 2,280 m (7,480 ft), (1961–1990)
Month	Jan	Feb	Mar	Apr	May	Jun	Jul	Aug	Sep	Oct	Nov	Dec	Year
Mean daily maximum °C (°F)	24.3 (75.7)	24.3 (75.7)	24.2 (75.6)	24.0 (75.2)	24.0 (75.2)	23.3 (73.9)	22.6 (72.7)	22.7 (72.9)	23.0 (73.4)	24.1 (75.4)	24.7 (76.5)	24.8 (76.6)	23.8 (74.9)
Daily mean °C (°F)	17.7 (63.9)	17.7 (63.9)	17.6 (63.7)	17.5 (63.5)	17.3 (63.1)	16.7 (62.1)	16.1 (61.0)	16.2 (61.2)	16.6 (61.9)	17.5 (63.5)	17.8 (64.0)	17.8 (64.0)	17.2 (63.0)
Mean daily minimum °C (°F)	11.1 (52.0)	11.1 (52.0)	11.1 (52.0)	11.1 (52.0)	11.0 (51.8)	10.5 (50.9)	10.0 (50.0)	10.0 (50.0)	10.3 (50.5)	10.6 (51.1)	10.6 (51.1)	11.0 (51.8)	10.7 (51.3)
Average precipitation mm (inches)	48.0 (1.89)	63.0 (2.48)	88.0 (3.46)	85.0 (3.35)	48.0 (1.89)	61.0 (2.40)	49.0 (1.93)	38.0 (1.50)	50.0 (1.97)	65.0 (2.56)	71.0 (2.80)	62.0 (2.44)	728 (28.67)
Source: FAO
