= Sevilla de Oro Canton =

Coordinates: 2.31667°S 78.1°W

- Canton
- Flag

- Location of Azuay Province in Ecuador.

- Sevilla de Oro Canton in Azuay Province
- Country: Ecuador
- Province: Azuay Province
- Time zone: UTC-5 (ECT)

Sevilla de Oro Canton is a canton of Ecuador, located in the Azuay Province. Its capital is the town of Sevilla de Oro. Its population at the 2001 census was 5,234.

== Demographics ==
Ethnic groups as of the Ecuadorian census of 2010:

- Mestizo 91.6%
- White 5.9%
- Afro-Ecuadorian 1.5%
- Indigenous 0.8%
- Montubio 0.2%
- Other 0.1%
