= Carchi Province =

Province of Ecuador

Coordinates: 0.45°N 78.05°W

Carchi
- Province
- Province of Carchi
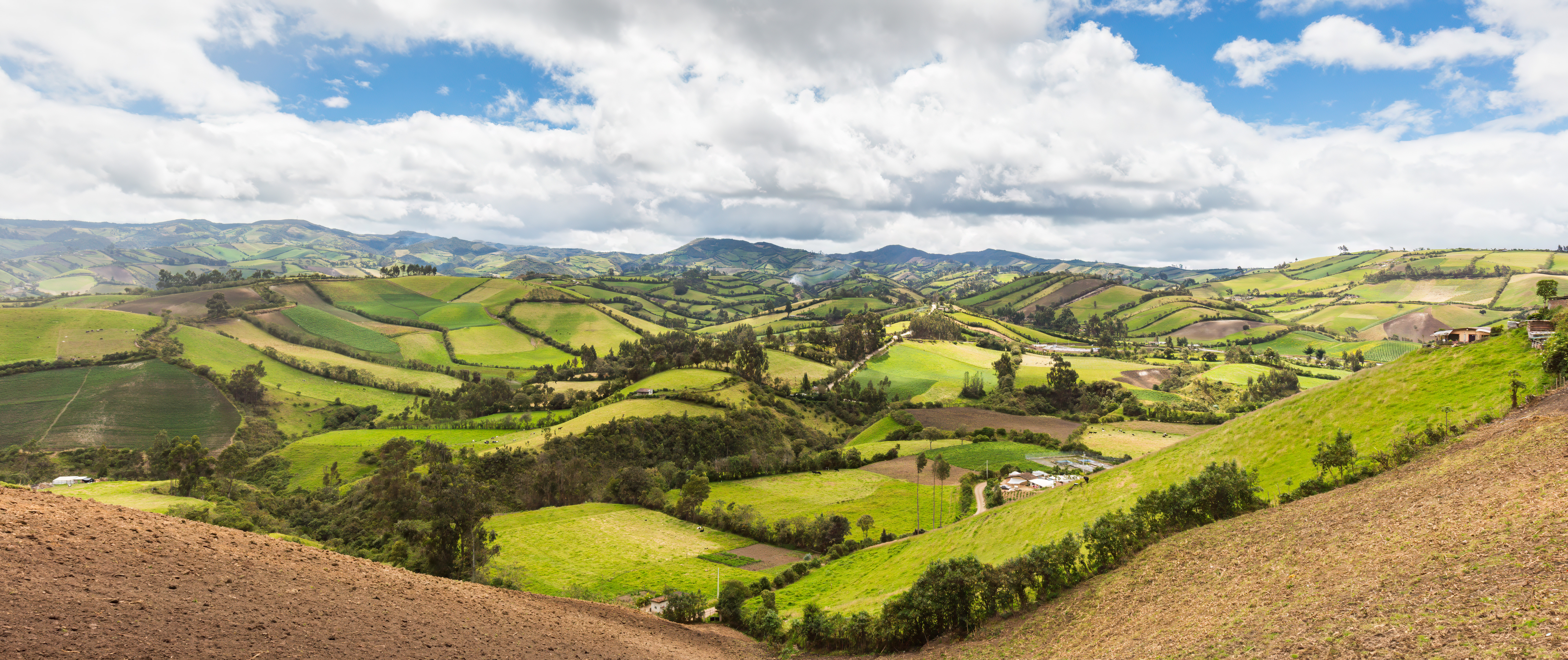

- Flag
- Nickname: Heir of the Sun, and Earth
- Carchi Province in Ecuador

- Cantons of Carchi Province
- Country: Ecuador
- Legal establishment: November 19, 1880
- Capital: Tulcán

Government
  - Prefect: Julio Robles (MSCC)
  - Vice Prefect: Verónica García
  - Governor: Lucía Pozo

Area
  - Total: 3,776 km^{2} (1,458 sq mi)

Population (2022 census)
  - Total: 172,828
  - Density: 45.77/km^{2} (118.5/sq mi)
- Time zone: UTC-5 (ECT)
- Vehicle registration: C
- HDI (2017): 0.727 high · 12th
- Website: www.carchi.gov.ec

Carchi (Spanish pronunciation: [ˈkaɾtʃi]) is a province in Ecuador. The capital is Tulcán. The Carchi River rises on the slopes of Chiles volcano and forms the boundary between Colombia and Ecuador near Tulcan. Rumichaca Bridge is the most important land route between Colombia and Ecuador.

== Economy ==
The provincial economy is based on industrial, and agriculture productions. Carchi produces food, drinks, tobacco, and dairy products. The agriculture sector produces potatoes, maize, etc.

== Cantons ==
The province is divided into 6 cantons. The following table lists each with its population at the 2010 census, its area in square kilometres (km^{2}), and the name of the canton seat or capital.

Canton	Pop. (2019)	Area (km^{2})	Seat/Capital
Bolívar	15,500	353	Bolívar
Espejo	13,860	554	El Ángel
Mira	12,070	588	Mira
Montúfar	34,030	383	San Gabriel
San Pedro de Huaca	8,840	71	Huaca
Tulcán	101,230	1,801	Tulcán

== Demographics ==
Ethnic groups as of the Ecuadorian census of 2010:

- Mestizo 86.9%
- Afro-Ecuadorian 6.4%
- Indigenous 3.4%
- White 2.9%
- Montubio 0.3%
- Other 0.1%

== Tourist destinations ==
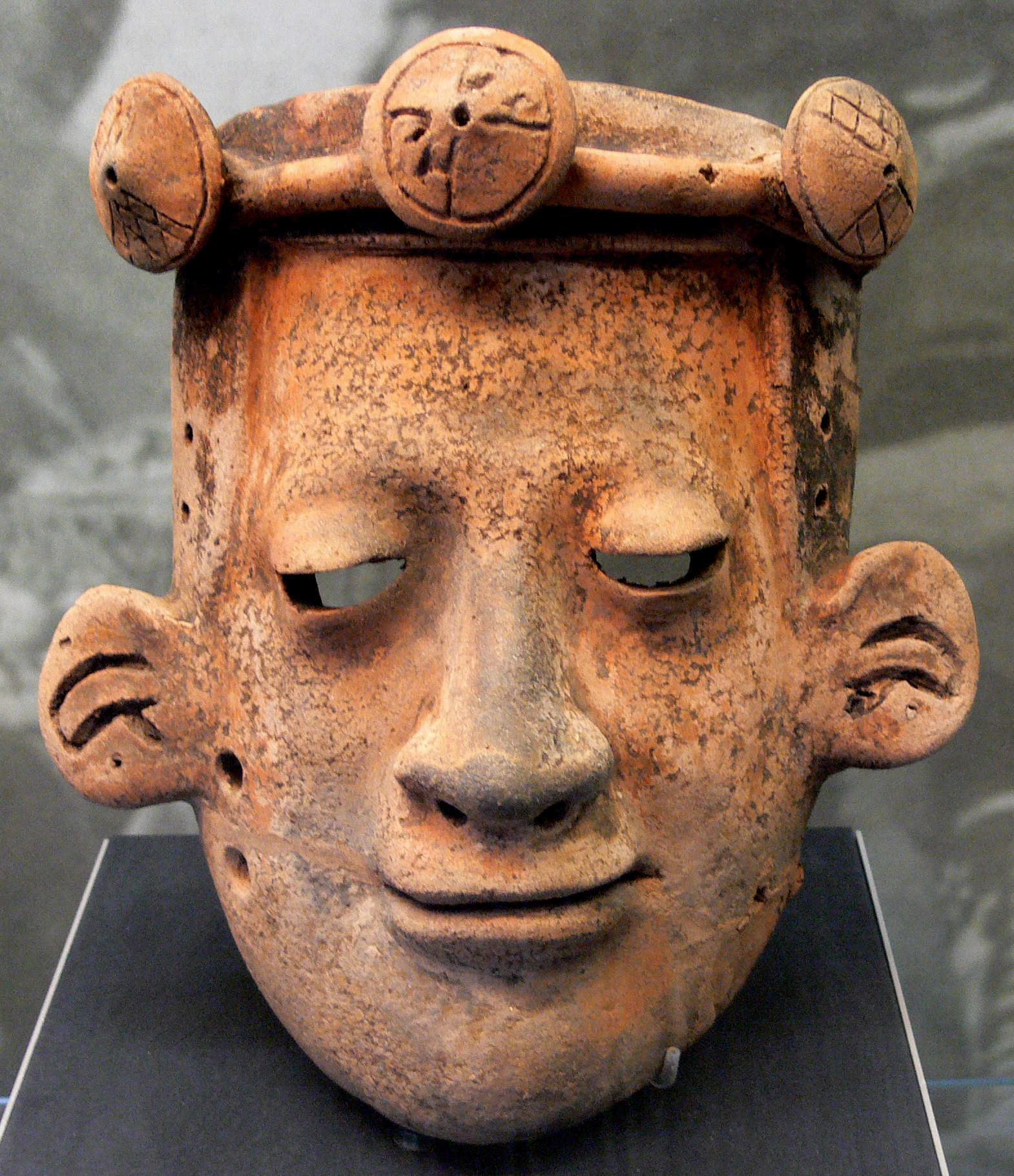
Ancient Carchi art

- Tulcán Cemetery - topiary garden cemetery;
- El Ángel ecological reserve, El Ángel - extensive páramo ecosystem with diverse biotopes, including the visually striking páramos de frailejones - moorland with a forest of ancient, up to 10 m tall Espeletia pycnophylla plants;
- Arrayanes Forest, San Gabriel - 16 ha large forest with rare trees whose bark is in cinnamon color;
- Lagunas Verdes on the way from Tufiño to Maldonado. Three lakes of volcanic origin with blue - green water, rich with sulphur;
- Gruta de la Paz, San Gabriel - show cave with a shrine of Virgin Mary;
- Laguna del Salado, San Gabriel - a serene lagoon with translucent water;
- Tufiño Hot Springs, Tulcán;
- "El Voladero" lagoons, El Angel;
- De Paluz Falls, San Gabriel;
- Guanderas Scientific Station, Huaca - a biological research station for montane ecosystems.

== See also ==
- Provinces of Ecuador
- Cantons of Ecuador
