= Marcabelí Canton =

- Canton
- Location of El Oro Province in Ecuador.

- Marcabelí Canton in El Oro Province
- Coordinates: 3.7860°S 79.8978°W
- Country: Ecuador
- Province: El Oro Province
- Capital: Marcabelí
- Time zone: UTC-5 (ECT)

Marcabelí Canton is a canton of Ecuador, located in the El Oro Province. Its capital is the town of Marcabelí. Its population at the 2001 census was 4,930.

== Demographics ==
Ethnic groups as of the Ecuadorian census of 2010:

- Mestizo 85.6%
- White 5.6%
- Montubio 5.2%
- Afro-Ecuadorian 3.4%
- Indigenous 0.1%
- Other 0.1%

== Climate ==
Climate data for Marcabelí, elevation 600 m (2,000 ft), (1961–1999)
Month	Jan	Feb	Mar	Apr	May	Jun	Jul	Aug	Sep	Oct	Nov	Dec	Year
Mean daily maximum °C (°F)	28.7 (83.7)	28.7 (83.7)	29.2 (84.6)	29.3 (84.7)	29.1 (84.4)	29.1 (84.4)	29.2 (84.6)	29.2 (84.6)	29.2 (84.6)	29.0 (84.2)	29.0 (84.2)	29.5 (85.1)	29.1 (84.4)
Daily mean °C (°F)	22.7 (72.9)	22.7 (72.9)	23.2 (73.8)	23.0 (73.4)	22.7 (72.9)	22.6 (72.7)	22.6 (72.7)	22.5 (72.5)	22.3 (72.1)	22.2 (72.0)	22.3 (72.1)	22.8 (73.0)	22.6 (72.8)
Mean daily minimum °C (°F)	18.0 (64.4)	18.1 (64.6)	18.2 (64.8)	18.1 (64.6)	18.1 (64.6)	17.7 (63.9)	17.6 (63.7)	17.6 (63.7)	17.3 (63.1)	17.5 (63.5)	17.5 (63.5)	17.7 (63.9)	17.8 (64.0)
Average precipitation mm (inches)	192.0 (7.56)	299.0 (11.77)	350.0 (13.78)	290.0 (11.42)	105.0 (4.13)	39.0 (1.54)	8.0 (0.31)	8.0 (0.31)	14.0 (0.55)	16.0 (0.63)	20.0 (0.79)	68.0 (2.68)	1,409 (55.47)
Source: FAO
