= Las Lajas Canton =

Coordinates: 3°47′06″S 80°03′42″W

- Canton
- Location of El Oro Province in Ecuador.

- Las Lajas Canton in El Oro Province
- Country: Ecuador
- Province: El Oro Province
- Time zone: UTC-5 (ECT)

Las Lajas Canton is a canton of Ecuador, located in the El Oro Province. Its capital is the town of La Victoria. Its population at the 2001 census was 4,781.

== Demographics ==
Ethnic groups as of the Ecuadorian census of 2010:

- Mestizo 88.0%
- White 4.7%
- Afro-Ecuadorian 3.9%
- Montubio 3.0%
- Indigenous 0.1%
- Other 0.3%
