= Chilla Canton =

- Canton
- Location of El Oro Province in Ecuador.

- Chilla Canton in El Oro Province
- Coordinates: 3.45°S 79.58°W
- Country: Ecuador
- Province: El Oro Province
- Time zone: UTC-5 (ECT)

Chilla Canton is a canton of Ecuador, located in the El Oro Province. Its capital is the town of Chilla. Its population at the 2001 census was 2,665.

== Demographics ==
Ethnic groups as of the Ecuadorian census of 2010:

- Mestizo 89.0%
- Montubio 7.2%
- White 2.9%
- Afro-Ecuadorian 0.8%
- Indigenous 0.0%
- Other 0.0%
