= Nabón Canton =

- Canton
- Flag

- Location of Azuay Province in Ecuador.

- Nabón Canton in Azuay Province
- Coordinates: 3.33606°S 79.06368°W
- Country: Ecuador
- Province: Azuay Province

Area
  - Total: 636 km^{2} (246 sq mi)

Population (2001)
  - Total: 15,121
  - Density: 23.8/km^{2} (61.6/sq mi)
- Time zone: UTC-5 (ECT)

Nabón Canton is a canton of Ecuador, located in the Azuay Province. Its capital is the town of Nabón. Its population at the 2001 census was 15,121.

== Demographics ==
Ethnic groups as of the Ecuadorian census of 2010:

- Mestizo 66.5%
- Indigenous 31.7%
- White 0.9%
- Afro-Ecuadorian 0.7%
- Montubio 0.1%
- Other 0.1%
