= Bolívar Canton, Carchi =

Coordinates: 0°30′08″N 77°54′19″W

Bolívar Canton
- Canton
- Location of Carchi Province in Ecuador.

- Bolivar Canton in Carchi Province
- Country: Ecuador
- Province: Carchi Province
- Time zone: UTC-5 (ECT)

Bolívar Canton is a canton of Ecuador, located in Carchi Province. Its capital is the town of Bolívar. Its population at the 2001 census was 13,898 and in 2010 was 14,347.

Bolivar is located in the Andes and the town of Bolivar has an elevation of 2,600 metres (8,500 ft) above sea level. Aside from Bolívar itself, the canton contains the rural parishes of García Moreno, Los Andes, Monte Olivo, San Rafael and San Vicente de Pusir.

== Demographics ==
Ethnic groups as of the Ecuadorian census of 2010:

- Mestizo 78.9%
- Afro-Ecuadorian 18.0%
- White 2.2%
- Indigenous 0.7%
- Montubio 0.2%
- Other 0.0%
