= San Pedro de Huaca Canton =

Coordinates: 0°37′52″N 77°43′31″W

- Canton
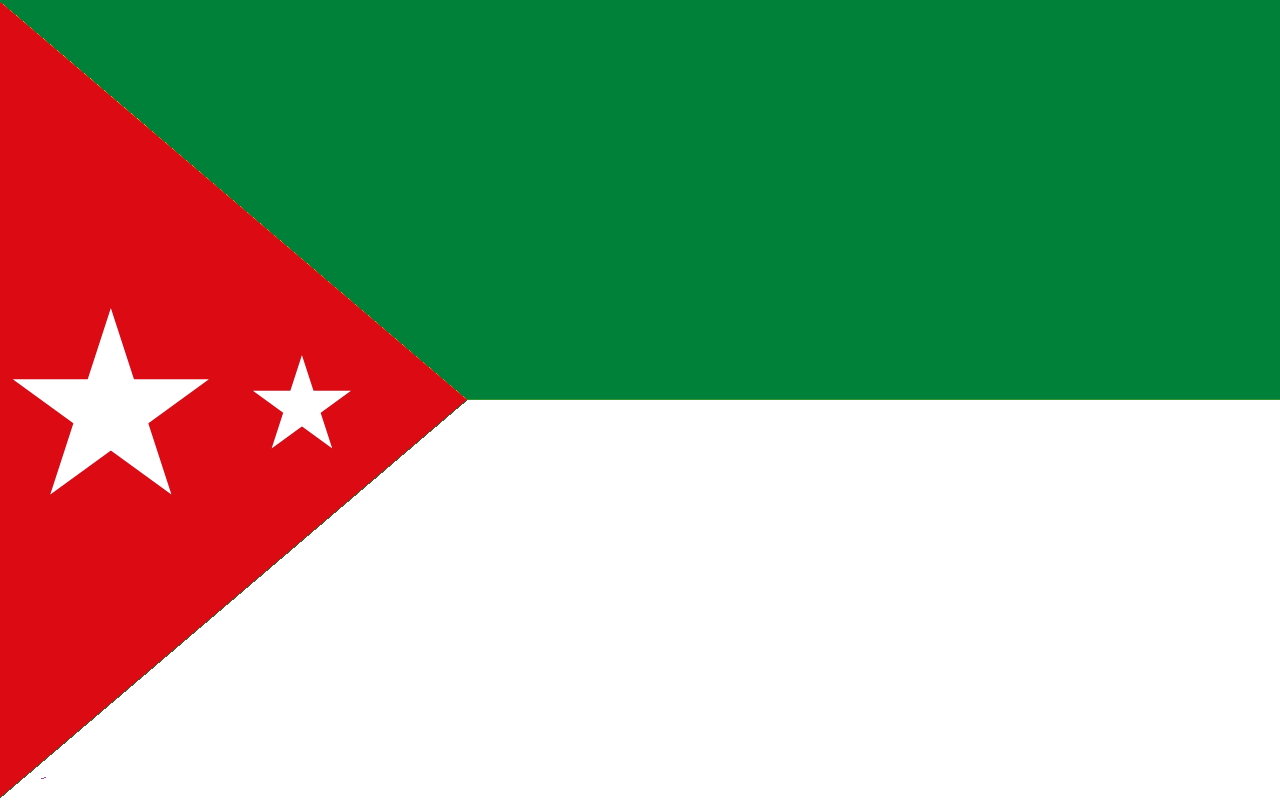
- Flag

- Location of Carchi Province in Ecuador.

- San Pedro de Huaca Canton in Carchi Province
- Country: Ecuador
- Province: Carchi Province
- Time zone: UTC-5 (ECT)

San Pedro de Huaca Canton is a canton of Ecuador, located in Carchi Province. Its capital is the town of Huaca. Its population in the 2001 census was 6,856 and in 2010 was 7,624. The area is 31 square kilometres (12 sq mi).

The canton is located in the Andes. The town of Huaca has an elevation of 2,932 metres (9,619 ft) above sea level.

The canton is divided into two parishes: Huaca (Waka) and Mariscal Sucre.

== Demographics ==
Ethnic groups as of the Ecuadorian census of 2010:

- Mestizo 93.4%
- White 3.2%
- Afro-Ecuadorian 1.8%
- Indigenous 1.4%
- Montubio 0.2%
- Other 0.1%
