= Mira Canton =

- Canton
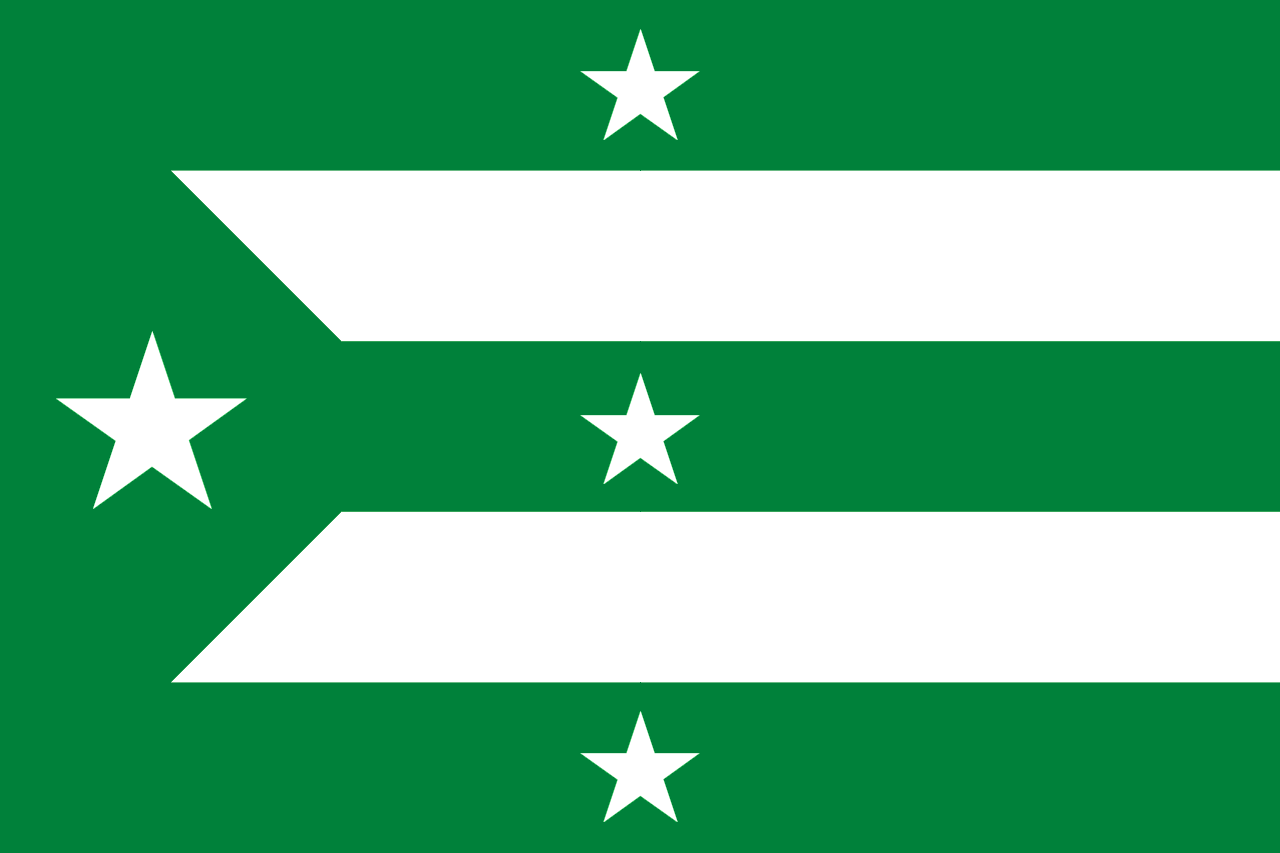
- Flag

- Location of Carchi Province in Ecuador.

- Mira Canton in Carchi Province
- Coordinates: 0°33′02″N 78°02′28″W
- Country: Ecuador
- Province: Carchi Province
- Time zone: UTC-5 (ECT)
- Website: http://www.mira.ec/

Mira Canton is a canton of Ecuador, located in Carchi Province. Its capital is the town of Mira. Its population in the 2001 census was 12,919 and was 12,180 in the 2010 census. The area is 588 square kilometres (227 sq mi).

The canton is located in the Andes and western foothills of the Andes on the upper tributaries of the Mira River. The town of Mira has an elevation of 2,423 metres (7,949 ft) above sea level.

The parishes in the canton are Concepción, Jijón y Caamańo, Juan Montalvo (San Ignacio de Quil), and Mira (Chontahuasi).

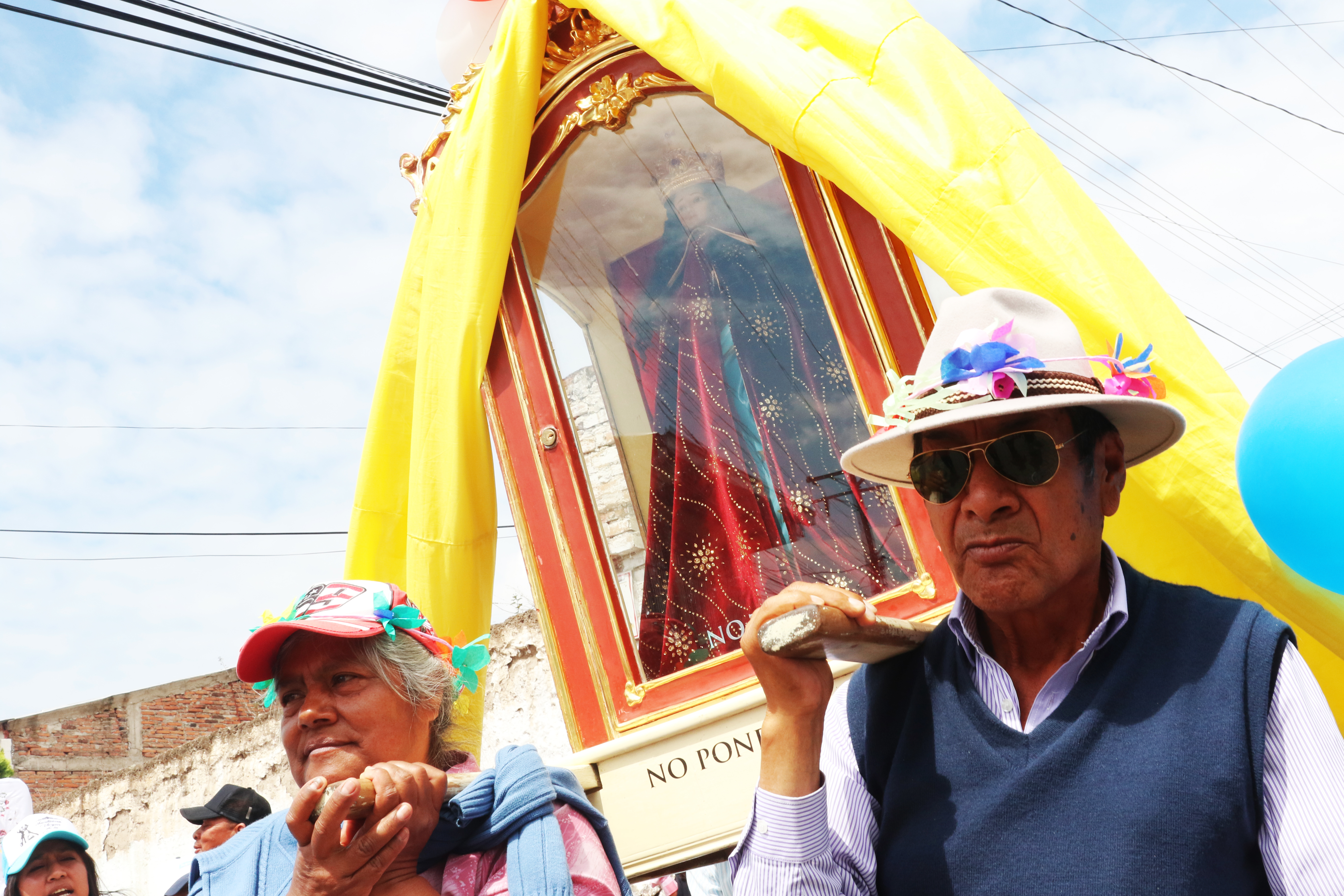
Festivities of Our Lady of Charity

== Demographics ==
Ethnic groups as of the Ecuadorian census of 2010:

- Mestizo 62.7%
- Afro-Ecuadorian 32.0%
- Indigenous 2.7%
- White 2.2%
- Montubio 0.3%
- Other 0.0%
