= Azuay Province =

Province of Ecuador

Azuay
- Province
- Province of Azuay
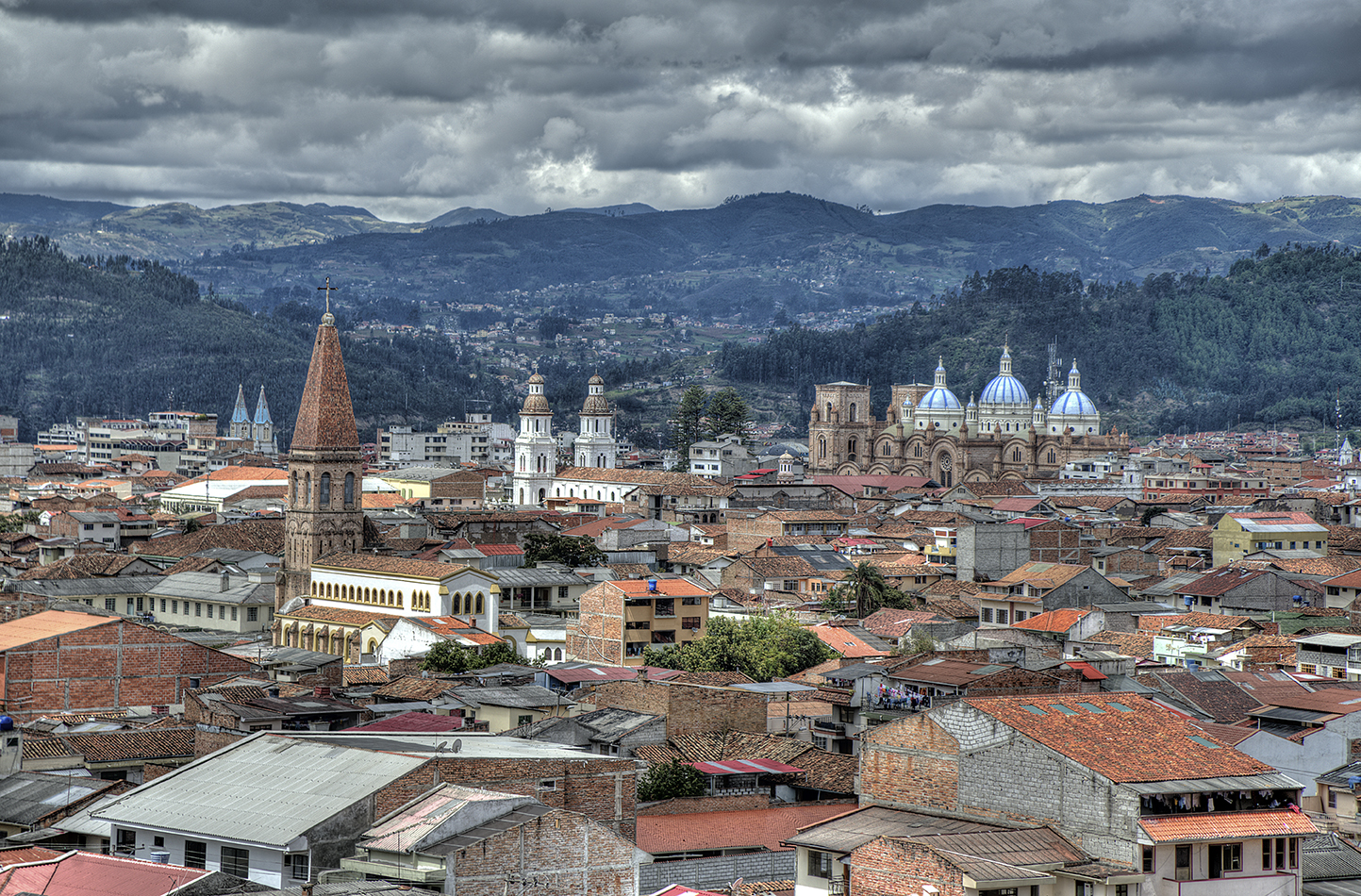

- Flag

- Location of Azuay in Ecuador.

- Cantons of Azuay Province
- Coordinates: 2°53′S 79°00′W
- Country: Ecuador
- Established: June 25, 1824
- Capital: Cuenca
- Cantons: List of Cantons: Camilo Ponce Enríuez; Chordeleg; Cuenca; El Pan; Girón; Guachapala; Gualaceo; Nabón; Oña; Paute; Pucara; San Fernando; Santa Isabel; Sevilla de Oro; Sigsig

Government
  - Prefect: Juan Cristóbal Lloret (RC)
  - Vice Prefect: Ale Quintanilla
  - Governor: Xavier Bermúdez

Area
  - Province: 8,171 km^{2} (3,155 sq mi)

Population (2022 census)
  - Province: 801,609
  - Density: 98.10/km^{2} (254.1/sq mi)
  - Urban: 420,141
- Time zone: UTC-5 (ECT)
- Area code: (+593) 7
- Vehicle registration: A
- HDI (2022): 0.791 high · 6th
- Website: www.azuay.gov.ec

Azuay (English: /əˈzwaɪ/, Spanish: [aˈswaj]), Province of Azuay is a province of Ecuador, created on 25 June 1824. It encompasses an area of 8,171 square kilometres (3,155 sq mi). Its capital and largest city is Cuenca. It is located in the south center of Ecuador in the highlands. Its mountains reach 4,500 m (14,800 ft) above sea level in the national park of El Cajas.

Azuay is located on the Panamerican Highway. Cuenca is connected by national flights from Quito and Guayaquil. It has the largest hydroelectric plant of the country, situated on the river Paute.

== Demographics ==
Ethnic groups as of the Ecuadorian census of 2010:

- Mestizo 89.6%
- White 5.1%
- Indigenous 2.5%
- Afro-Ecuadorian 2.2%
- Montubio 0.4%
- Other 0.2%

== Cantons ==
The province is divided into 15 cantons. The following table lists each with its population at the 2010 census, its area in square kilometres (km^{2}), and the name of the canton seat or capital.

| Canton | Pop. (2019) | Area (km^{2}) | Seat/Capital |
|---|---|---|---|
| Camilo Ponce Enríquez | 34,770 | 639.28 | Camilo Ponce Enríquez |
| Chordeleg | 14,980 | 104.98 | Chordeleg |
| Cuenca | 625,780 | 3,190.54 | Cuenca |
| El Pan | 3,110 | 132.29 | El Pan |
| Girón | 13,070 | 353.75 | Girón |
| Guachapala | 3,830 | 39.59 | Guachapala |
| Gualaceo | 48,700 | 349.78 | Gualaceo |
| Nabón | 17,250 | 632.93 | Nabón |
| Oña | 4,090 | 293.08 | Oña |
| Paute | 28,990 | 270.79 | Paute |
| Pucará | 10,600 | 585.46 | Pucará |
| San Fernando | 4,170 | 138.62 | San Fernando |
| Santa Isabel | 20,790 | 604.61 | Santa Isabel |
| Sevilla de Oro | 6,820 | 314.85 | Sevilla de Oro |
| Sigsig | 30,300 | 659.03 | Sígsig |

== See also ==
- Provinces of Ecuador
- Cantons of Ecuador
- Azuay mine
