= Nabon =

Nabon may refer to:

- Nabón Canton, Azuay Province, Ecuador
- Nabon, a village in Podgorica Capital City, Montenegro
- Jonah Nabon (1713–1760), Ottoman rabbi
