= Pedro Vicente Maldonado (city) =

- City
- Location within Ecuador
- Coordinates: 0°5′7″S 79°3′4″W
- Country: Ecuador
- Province: Pichincha
- Canton: Pedro Vicente Maldonado

Area
  - City: 2.72 km^{2} (1.05 sq mi)

Population (2022 census)
  - City: 7,162
  - Density: 2,630/km^{2} (6,820/sq mi)
- Climate: BSh
- Website: www.pedrovicentemaldonado.gob.ec

Pedro Vicente Maldonado is a city in the Pichincha province of Ecuador and the capital of Pedro Vicente Maldonado Canton. It is located on the right bank of the Caoní River, to the northwest of the province, on the outer flanks of the western cordillera of the Andes, at an altitude of 605 m and with a rainy tropical climate of 23 °C on average.

In the census of 2010, it had a population of 5,561. Its origins date from the middle of 20th century, due to its geographical location, which links Quito, with Esmeraldas Province. The main activities of the city are commerce, livestock, tourism and agriculture.
