= Azuay mine =

Gold mine in Ecuador

Location
- Location: Azuay Province, Ecuador

Production
- Products: Gold

Owner
- Company: PanTerra Gold

The Azuay mine is one of the largest gold mines in the Ecuador and in the world. The mine is located in the south of the country in Azuay Province. The mine has estimated reserves of 1.28 million oz of gold.
