= Girón, Azuay =

Girón
- Town and parish
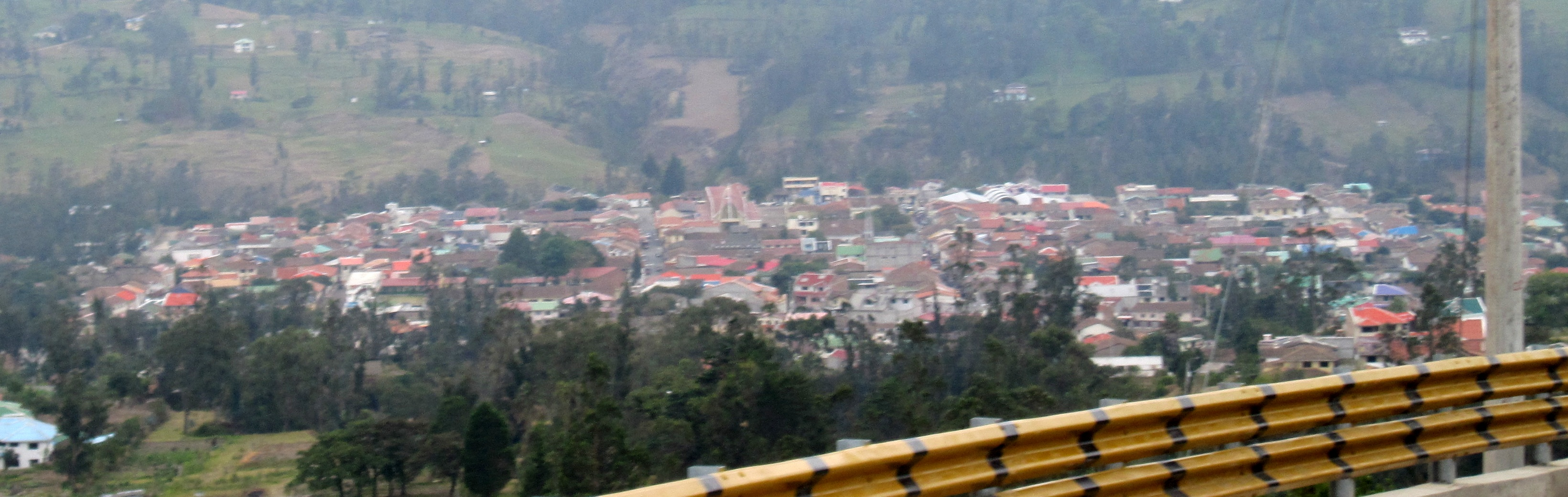

- Location within Ecuador
- Coordinates: 3.159028°S 79.147568°W
- Country: Ecuador
- Province: Azuay
- Canton: Girón Canton

Government
  - Mayor (Canton): José Miguel Uzhca

Area
  - Town: 2.85 km^{2} (1.10 sq mi)
  - Parish: 239.4 km^{2} (92.4 sq mi)
- Elevation: 2,160 m (7,090 ft)

Population (2022 census)
  - Town: 4,353
  - Density: 1,530/km^{2} (3,960/sq mi)
  - Parish: 8,441
  - Parish density: 35.26/km^{2} (91.32/sq mi)
- Climate: Cwb

Girón is a town and parish in Azuay Province, Ecuador. The town has a population of 4,353, and Girón parish as a whole has a population of 8,441.

== History ==
Girón was initially occupied by the Leoquina culture. During the Inca Empire, the area was known as Pacaybamba, meaning guava tree valley. The name Girón was given to the city by Captain Francisco Hernández Girón during his stay there in 1534. The exact date of the city's founding is unknown, as the relevant documents have been lost. When the Spanish built ranches on the land, its indigenous inhabitants moved away into the surrounding countryside and mountains. During the colonial era, land was concentrated in the hands of the rich, and there was a high level of social stratification.

Girón was first classified as a villa (small town), but in 1814 it was elevated to a canton. A treaty following the 1829 Battle of Tarqui was signed in Girón. The canton of Girón was annexed to the canton of Cuenca in 1854. It was promoted to its own canton again in 1884 and demoted again in 1890, finally becoming a canton in 1897. In 1890, Girón encompassed the parroquias of San Fernando, La Asunción, Nabón, Cochapata, Oña, Pucará and Zhaglli, but later several of these parroquias were promoted to canton status. Today, Girón contains only the rural parroquias of La Asunción and San Gerardo.

== Geography and climate ==
The town of Girón is located 44 km southwest of Cuenca by road, at an elevation of 2160 m.

The climate of the town of Girón is milder than that of nearby Cuenca. There are two seasons: winter (January to May) and summer (June to December). Within the canton of Girón, the climate varies by altitude. In and around the town of Girón, the climate is Humid and Semihumid Mesothermal Ecuatorial: average annual temperatures are between 12 and 20 °C, with annual precipitation between 500 and 2000 mm. There is a High Mountain Cold Ecuatorial zone at approximately 3000m elevation; here, there is a temperature average of 8 °C and annual precipitation between 500 and 2000 mm. Along the descending mountain slopes between 1000 and 2000 m elevation, the climate depends on the elevation. In the subtropical valleys, it is warm and dry. La Asunción, for example, has an average temperature of 21 °C and receives 500 mm of precipitation.

The most important river in the canton of Girón is Río Girón, a tributary of Río Rircay. Río Rircay, also located in the canton, is a tributary of Río Jubones. Other rivers include El Chorro, Río Falso, Río Mandur, Río El Burro, Río Manzano, Río Rosas o Zhurzha y Río San Gregorio. A few lakes exist in the canton; the most important is Laguna de San Martín. Other lakes include Chapana Lake, Guandeleg Lake, and Zhogra Lake. Bestión Lake is popular with tourists. The El Chorro series of waterfalls is located 5 kilometres (3.1 mi) above the town of Girón and is a popular tourist site.

== Cityscape ==
Girón has a central plaza with a park and a modern church. Rough guide to Ecuador: "Girón is built around a pretty central square overlooked by once-grand old houses with clay-tiled roofs and wooden balconies, and a rather avant-garde concrete church." Many of its streets are lined with colonial- and Republican-era homes. The town was declared a Patrimonio Cultural de la Nación (National Cultural Patrimony) on December 20, 2006. The church has the form of a basilica. Its stained glass windows were made by Guillermo Larrazábal. Construction on the church began in 1958 and was completed by 1968.

The Casa de los Tratados, where the Treaty of Girón was signed, is today a museum that houses a collection of weapons, clothing, and instruments used by the Ecuadorian army.

== Demographics ==
The canton of Girón had a population of 12,583, at the 2001 census, of which 45.8% are men and 54.2% are women. 3,518 people live in the town of Girón, 5,105 people in the surrounding rural area, 2,885 in the parroquia of Asunción, and 1,075 in the parroquia of San Gerardo. The canton has a young population, with 47.3% of its residents under 20 years old.

Education levels in the canton are relatively low, with 67.4% having only preschool or primary education and 9.7% having no formal education at all. 11.9% of the canton's population has secondary education, and 2% has some sort of higher education. 9.7% of respondents did not indicate their level of education. Education levels are higher in the town of Girón, with 25.6% having secondary education and 5.1% with higher education. After a literacy program in the province of Azuay, the illiteracy rate was reduced from 11.7% as of the last census to 2.3% as of 2009.

== Economy and transportation ==
Girón's economy is based on agriculture and animal husbandry. Girón was previously an important center for the cultivation of Canna indica. In the parish of La Asunción, there is one community-run small business, which raises guinea pigs.

Textiles such as ponchos and blankets are woven in the rural communities of Masta Grande, Masta Chico, Zapata and Sinchay. In rural areas, old women often spin yarn using traditional methods; this yarn is used in local weaving.

Girón is located along Highway 80 between Cuenca and Machala and is served by bus.

== Culture ==
There is little artisanal production in Girón, but the canton has a rich oral tradition.

The icon of El Señor de Girón is a crucifix from Girón that is believed to bring rain during droughts and to bring prosperity. The town's Fiesta de Toros celebrates this icon.

Traditionally, women from Girón have worn typical dress consisting of a skirt (pollera) and blouse (blusa bordada). The skirts have three parts: a debajero (petticoat), embroidered pollera (an elegant gathered skirt worn over the petticoat), and a bolsicón (a plain overskirt used to protect the pollera and also used to flirt by lifting the bolsicón to reveal the pollera underneath. Typical blouses are decorated with lace, stones, and beads. Today, traditional dress has been fading because of economic changes and a surge in migration; traditional clothing is now typically a luxury.

== Government ==
The mayor of the canton of Girón is Cristian Ochoa.
