= San Fernando Canton =

- Canton
- Flag

- Location of Azuay Province in Ecuador.

- Cantons of Azuay Province
- Coordinates: 3.1445°S 79.2520°W
- Country: Ecuador
- Province: Azuay Province
- Time zone: UTC-5 (ECT)

San Fernando Canton is a canton of Ecuador, located in the Azuay Province. Its capital is the town of San Fernando. Its population at the 2001 census was 3,961. San Fernando's main attraction is its famous lagoon, Laguna de Busa. The main source of income is agriculture and livestock. The town itself is mainly rural, and the townspeople are mainly elders, 65+ years old.

== Town's history ==
It is named after Saint Fernando, whose celebration day is on May 30th. The primary language spoken is Spanish.

== Known villages within San Fernando's Canton ==
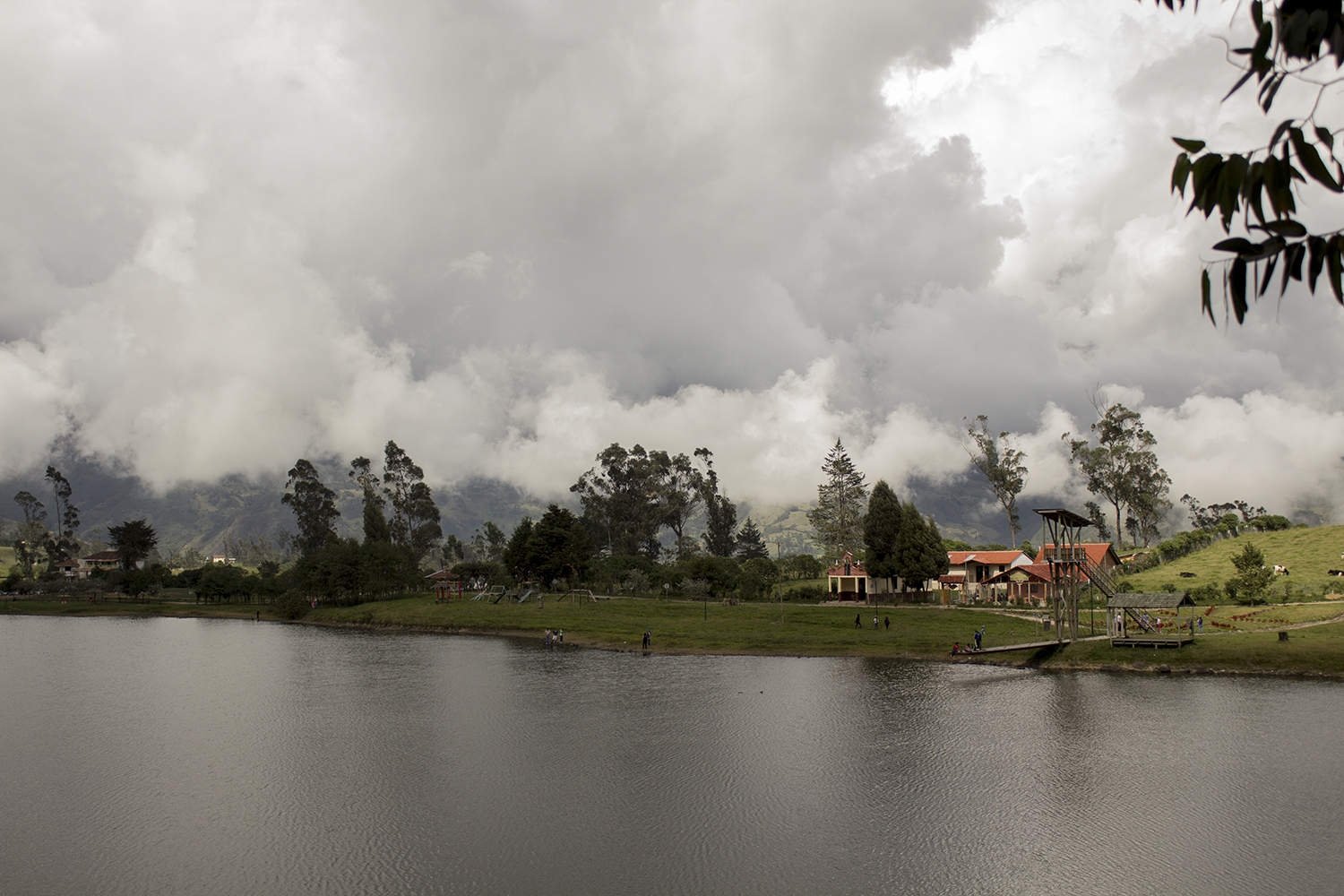
Laguna de Busa

There are small villages within the canton. Towns such as:

- María
- Fátima
- La Unión
- Zhima
- Busa (near the famous Laguna de Busa)
- Guanizhapa
- Santo Domingo
- San Pedro
- El Pueblo
- Guagualzhumi
- San José de Rircay
- Las Juntas
