= Cantons of Ecuador =

Second-level administrative divisions of Ecuador

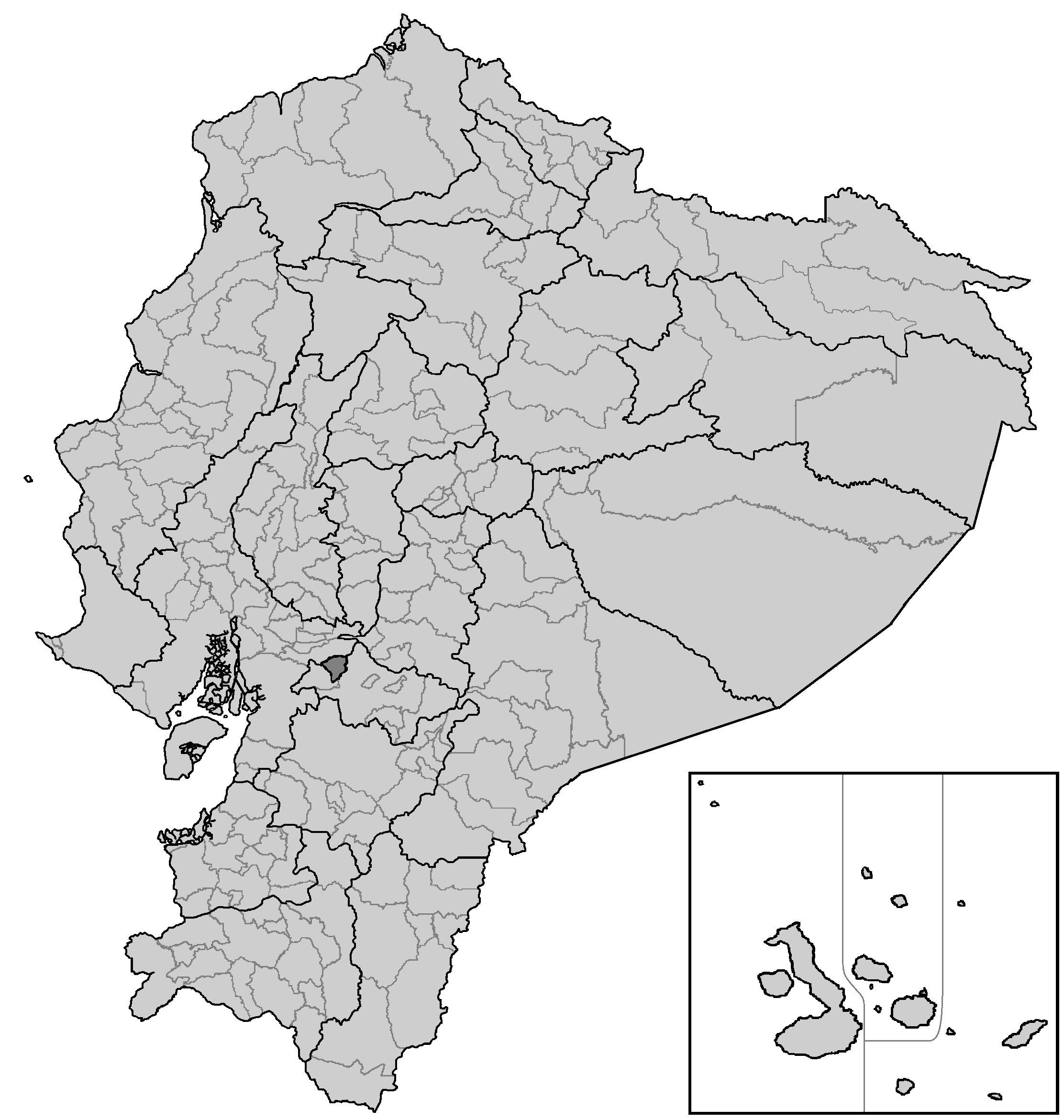
Cantons of Ecuador

The cantons of Ecuador are the second-level subdivisions of Ecuador, below the provinces. The cantons are further subdivided into parishes, which are classified as either urban or rural.

As of 2025, there are 222 cantons in the country. The most recently created cantons are Sevilla Don Bosco in Morona Santiago Province in 2024; and La Concordia in Esmeraldas Province in 2007, although in 2013 La Concordia was transferred to Santo Domingo de los Tsáchilas Province.

Below is a list of cantons by province. All populations are as of the 2022 census, with the exception of the canton of Sevilla Don Bosco, as it did not exist at the time.

== Azuay Province (15 cantons) ==
Canton	Pop. (2022)	Area (km^{2})	Seat/Capital
Camilo Ponce Enríquez	22,810	214	Camilo Ponce Enríquez
Chordeleg	12,197	104	Chordeleg
Cuenca	596,101	3,195	Cuenca
El Pan	2,776	139	El Pan
Girón	12,182	343	Girón
Guachapala	3,586	41	Guachapala
Gualaceo	43,188	346	Gualaceo
Nabón	14,776	632	Nabón
Oña	3,422	290	Oña
Paute	26,782	268	Paute
Pucará	9,693	639	Pucará
San Fernando	3,738	143	San Fernando
Santa Isabel	20,753	827	Santa Isabel
Sevilla de Oro	4,613	315	Sevilla de Oro
Sígsig	24,992	677	Sígsig

== Bolívar Province (7 cantons) ==
Canton	Pop. (2022)	Area (km^{2})	Seat/Capital
Caluma	15,607	176	Caluma
Chillanes	19,802	670	Chillanes
Chimbo	15,524	270	Chimbo
Echeandía	14,654	245	Echeandía
Guaranda	98,130	1,860	Guaranda
Las Naves	7,012	150	Las Naves
San Miguel	28,349	586	San Miguel

== Cañar Province (7 cantons) ==
Canton	Pop. (2022)	Area (km^{2})	Seat/Capital
Azogues	74,515	954	Azogues
Biblián	18,852	182	Biblián
Cañar	52,150	1,954	Cañar
Déleg	6,046	74	Déleg
El Tambo	9,285	63	El Tambo
La Troncal	62,103	367	La Troncal
Suscal	4,627	53	Suscal

== Carchi Province (6 cantons) ==
Canton	Pop. (2022)	Area (km^{2})	Seat/Capital
Bolívar	15,677	360	Bolívar
Espejo	14,522	568	El Ángel
Mira	12,727	584	Mira
Montúfar	29,590	381	San Gabriel
San Pedro de Huaca	7,937	76	Huaca
Tulcán	92,375	1,815	Tulcán

== Chimborazo Province (10 cantons) ==
Canton	Pop. (2022)	Area (km^{2})	Seat/Capital
Alausí	37,275	1,289	Alausí
Chambo	13,431	166	Chambo
Chunchi	10,635	273	Chunchi
Colta	30,468	820	Cajabamba (also known as Villa la Unión)
Cumandá	16,602	159	Cumandá
Guamote	35,769	1,194	Guamote
Guano	48,327	465	Guano
Pallatanga	11,796	380	Pallatanga
Penipe	6,748	371	Penipe
Riobamba	260,882	999	Riobamba

== Cotopaxi Province (7 cantons) ==
Canton	Pop. (2022)	Area (km^{2})	Seat/Capital
La Maná	53,793	661	La Maná
Latacunga	217,261	1,496	Latacunga
Pangua	21,867	720	El Corazón
Pujilí	66,980	1,329	Pujilí
Salcedo	67,493	469	San Miguel
Saquisilí	24,356	156	Saquisilí
Sigchos	18,460	1,358	Sigchos

== El Oro Province (14 cantons) ==
Canton	Pop. (2022)	Area (km^{2})	Seat/Capital
Arenillas	32,366	787	Arenillas
Atahualpa	6,112	282	Paccha
Balsas	7,875	69	Balsas
Chilla	2,251	332	Chilla
El Guabo	59,536	580	El Guabo
Huaquillas	56,303	99	Huaquillas
Las Lajas	5,738	299	La Victoria
Machala	306,309	372	Machala
Marcabelí	6,870	148	Marcabelí
Pasaje	83,597	456	Pasaje
Piñas	29,406	614	Piñas
Portovelo	13,556	284	Portovelo
Santa Rosa	80,299	896	Santa Rosa
Zaruma	24,374	652	Zaruma

== Esmeraldas Province (7 cantons) ==
Canton	Pop. (2022)	Area (km^{2})	Seat/Capital
Atacames	51,204	510	Atacames
Eloy Alfaro	46,305	4,480	Valdez
Esmeraldas	211,848	1,346	Esmeraldas
Muisne	36,426	1,266	Muisne
Quinindé	126,841	3,621	Rosa Zárate (also known as Quinindé)
Río Verde	32,885	1,513	Rio Verde
San Lorenzo	48,391	3,099	San Lorenzo

== Galápagos Province (3 cantons) ==
Canton	Pop. (2022)	Area (km^{2})	Seat/Capital
Isabela	3,050	5,528	Puerto Villamil
San Cristóbal	8,300	850	Puerto Baquerizo Moreno
Santa Cruz	17,233	1,855	Puerto Ayora

== Guayas Province (25 cantons) ==
Canton	Pop. (2022)	Area (km^{2})	Seat/Capital
Alfredo Baquerizo Moreno (Jujan)	25,526	228	Alfredo Baquerizo Moreno (also known as Jujan)
Balao	25,655	439	Balao
Balzar	57,829	1,176	Balzar
Colimes	26,251	757	Colimes
Coronel Marcelino Maridueña	13,183	254	Coronel Marcelino Maridueña
Daule	222,446	511	Daule
Durán	303,910	342	Durán
El Empalme	79,767	649	El Empalme
El Triunfo	60,541	560	El Triunfo
General Antonio Elizalde	11,810	141	General Antonio Elizalde
Guayaquil	2,746,403	4,491	Guayaquil
Isidro Ayora	14,305	492	Isidro Ayora
Lomas de Sargentillo	22,254	72	Lomas de Sargentillo
Milagro	195,943	399	Milagro
Naranjal	83,691	1,702	Naranjal
Naranjito	44,169	231	Naranjito
Nobol	23,850	135	Nobol (also known as Narcisa de Jesús)
Palestina	18,019	186	Palestina
Pedro Carbo	52,177	941	Pedro Carbo
Playas (General Villamil Playas)	58,768	270	Playas (also known as General Villamil Playas)
Salitre	61,060	393	El Salitre
Samborondón	98,540	344	Samborondón
Santa Lucía	43,700	365	Santa Lucía
Simón Bolívar	29,427	290	Simón Bolívar
Yaguachi	72,699	531	Yaguachi (San Jacinto de Yaguachi)

== Imbabura Province (6 cantons) ==
Canton	Pop. (2022)	Area (km^{2})	Seat/Capital
Antonio Ante	53,771	80	Atuntaqui
Cotacachi	53,001	1,865	Cotacachi
Ibarra	217,469	1,139	Ibarra
Otavalo	114,303	531	Otavalo
Pimampiro	13,366	440	Pimampiro
San Miguel de Urcuquí	17,969	736	Urcuquí

== Loja Province (16 cantons) ==
Canton	Pop. (2022)	Area (km^{2})	Seat/Capital
Calvas	26,042	851	Cariamanga
Catamayo	35,240	652	Catamayo
Celica	14,379	522	Celica
Chaguarpamba	6,857	313	Chaguarpamba
Espíndola	14,119	516	Amaluza (Espíndola)
Gonzanamá	12,247	682	Gonzanamá
Loja	250,028	1,891	Loja
Macará	18,215	573	Macará
Olmedo	4,164	114	Olmedo
Paltas	22,841	1,156	Catacocha
Pindal	10,409	202	Pindal
Puyango	16,257	637	Alamor
Quilanga	3,971	237	Quilanga
Saraguro	29,111	1,085	Saraguro
Sozoranga	6,970	422	Sozoranga
Zapotillo	14,571	1,212	Zapotillo

== Los Ríos Province (13 cantons) ==
Canton	Pop. (2022)	Area (km^{2})	Seat/Capital
Baba	45,296	515	Baba
Babahoyo	178,509	1,071	Babahoyo
Buena Fe	74,410	581	San Jacinto de Buena Fe
Mocache	42,026	566	Mocache
Montalvo	28,354	355	Montalvo
Palenque	24,838	569	Palenque
Pueblo Viejo	40,961	334	Puebloviejo
Quevedo	206,008	379	Quevedo
Quinsaloma	19,470	289	Quinsaloma
Urdaneta	33,151	385	Catarama
Valencia	51,509	970	Valencia
Ventanas	73,211	513	Ventanas
Vinces	80,909	711	Vinces

== Manabí Province (22 cantons) ==
Canton	Pop. (2022)	Area (km^{2})	Seat/Capital
Bolívar	41,827	524	Calceta
Chone	128,166	3,062	Chone
El Carmen	120,936	1,741	El Carmen
Flavio Alfaro	26,415	1,347	Flavio Alfaro
Jama	16,588	568	Jama
Jaramijó	29,759	97	Jaramijó
Jipijapa	78,117	1,476	Jipijapa
Junín	22,324	267	Junín
Manta	271,145	290	Manta
Montecristi	99,937	705	Montecristi
Olmedo	10,090	257	Olmedo
Paján	41,879	1,100	Paján
Pedernales	70,408	1,969	Pedernales
Pichincha	30,380	1,075	Pichincha
Portoviejo	322,925	957	Portoviejo
Puerto López	25,630	429	Puerto López
Rocafuerte	42,688	279	Rocafuerte
San Vicente	24,997	737	San Vicente
Santa Ana	51,462	1,019	Santa Ana
Sucre	62,841	693	Bahía de Caráquez
Tosagua	42,853	381	Tosagua
Veinticuatro de Mayo	31,473	546	Sucre

== Morona-Santiago Province (13 cantons) ==
Canton	Pop. (2022)	Area (km^{2})	Seat/Capital
Gualaquiza	21,892	2,160	Gualaquiza
Huamboya	10,830	656	Huamboya
Limón Indanza	9,602	1,831	General Leonidas Plaza Gutiérrez
Logroño	7,484	1,179	Logroño
Morona	54,935	4,368	Macas
Pablo Sexto	2,267	1,389	Pablo Sexto
Palora	11,882	1,451	Palora
San Juan Bosco	4,372	1,090	San Juan Bosco
Santiago de Méndez	9,755	1,368	Santiago de Méndez
Sevilla Don Bosco	-	-	Sevilla Don Bosco
Sucúa	23,504	1,196	Sucúa
Taisha	26,700	6,135	Taisha
Tiwintza	9,285	1,181	Santiago

== Napo Province (5 cantons) ==
Canton	Pop. (2022)	Area (km^{2})	Seat/Capital
Archidona	30,488	3,057	Archidona
Carlos Julio Arosemena Tola	4,647	501	Carlos Julio Arosemena Tola
El Chaco	9,252	3,485	El Chaco
Quijos	6,472	1,591	Baeza
Tena	80,816	3,908	Tena

== Orellana Province (4 cantons) ==
Canton	Pop. (2022)	Area (km^{2})	Seat/Capital
Aguarico	6,872	11,294	Nueva Rocafuerte
Francisco de Orellana	95,130	7,083	Puerto Francisco de Orellana (also known as Coca)
Joya de los Sachas	52,444	1,202	La Joya de los Sachas
Loreto	27,720	2,151	Loreto

== Pastaza Province (4 cantons) ==
Canton	Pop. (2022)	Area (km^{2})	Seat/Capital
Arajuno	9,553	8,859	Arajuno
Mera	15,087	531	Mera
Pastaza	82,754	19,944	Puyo
Santa Clara	4,521	313	Santa Clara

== Pichincha Province (8 cantons) ==
Canton	Pop. (2022)	Area (km^{2})	Seat/Capital
Cayambe	105,267	1,201	Cayambe
Mejía	101,894	1,411	Machachi
Pedro Moncayo	40,483	335	Tabacundo
Pedro Vicente Maldonado	15,475	619	Pedro Vicente Maldonado
Puerto Quito	25,067	696	Puerto Quito
Quito	2,679,722	4,201	Quito
Rumiñahui	107,904	135	Sangolquí
San Miguel de Los Bancos	13,661	855	San Miguel de los Bancos

== Santa Elena Province (3 cantons) ==
Canton	Pop. (2022)	Area (km^{2})	Seat/Capital
La Libertad	112,247	25	La Libertad
Salinas	86,801	68	Salinas
Santa Elena	186,687	3,595	Santa Elena

== Santo Domingo de Los Tsáchilas Province (2 cantons) ==
Canton	Pop. (2022)	Area (km^{2})	Seat/Capital
La Concordia	51,386	324	La Concordia
Santo Domingo de los Colorados	441,583	3,455	Santo Domingo de los Colorados

== Sucumbíos Province (7 cantons) ==
Canton	Pop. (2022)	Area (km^{2})	Seat/Capital
Cascales	11,744	1,262	El Dorado de Cascales
Cuyabeno	8,852	3,865	Tarapoa
Gonzalo Pizarro	10,356	2,245	Lumbaqui
Lago Agrio	105,044	3,151	Nueva Loja (Lago Agrio)
Putumayo	9,018	3,551	Puerto Carmen
Shushufindi	50,826	2,506	Shushufindi
Sucumbíos	3,174	1,517	La Bonita

== Tungurahua Province (9 cantons) ==
Canton	Pop. (2022)	Area (km^{2})	Seat/Capital
Ambato	370,664	1,022	Ambato
Baños	21,908	1,068	Baños de Agua Santa
Cevallos	10,433	19	Cevallos
Mocha	7,260	85	Mocha
Patate	13,879	293	Patate
Pelileo	63,897	200	Pelileo (San Pedro de Pelileo)
Píllaro	42,497	470	Píllaro (Santiago de Píllaro)
Quero	19,084	169	Quero
Tisaleo	13,910	60	Tisaleo

== Zamora-Chinchipe Province (9 cantons) ==
Canton	Pop. (2022)	Area (km^{2})	Seat/Capital
Centinela del Cóndor	7,882	260	Zumbi
Chinchipe	10,337	1,102	Zumba
El Pangui	12,768	632	El Pangui
Nangaritza	6,429	2,021	Guayzimi (Nangaritza)
Palanda	8,873	2,042	Palanda
Paquisha	4,737	339	Paquisha
Yacuambi	6,391	1,253	Yacuambi
Yantzaza	23,370	1,014	Yantzaza
Zamora	30,186	1,901	Zamora

== Non-delimited areas ==
Four areas in Ecuador previously did not belong to any province. These were:

- Las Golondrinas: In a referendum held on April 3, 2016, 56.9% of voters voted in favor of Las Golondrinas being incorporated into the Imbabura Province.
- La Manga del Cura: In a referendum held on September 27, 2015, 64.2% of the voters voted in favor of La Manga del Cura being incorporated into the Manabí Province.
- El Piedrero and Matilde Esther: incorporated into Guayas Province by presidential decree in 2017.

== Authorities ==
In each canton there is a jefe político, chosen by, and representing the interests of, the president. There is also a mayor (alcalde) and a municipal council (concejo municipal), chosen by popular vote.

== See also ==
- Provinces of Ecuador
