= Montubio =

Ethnic group in coastal Ecuador

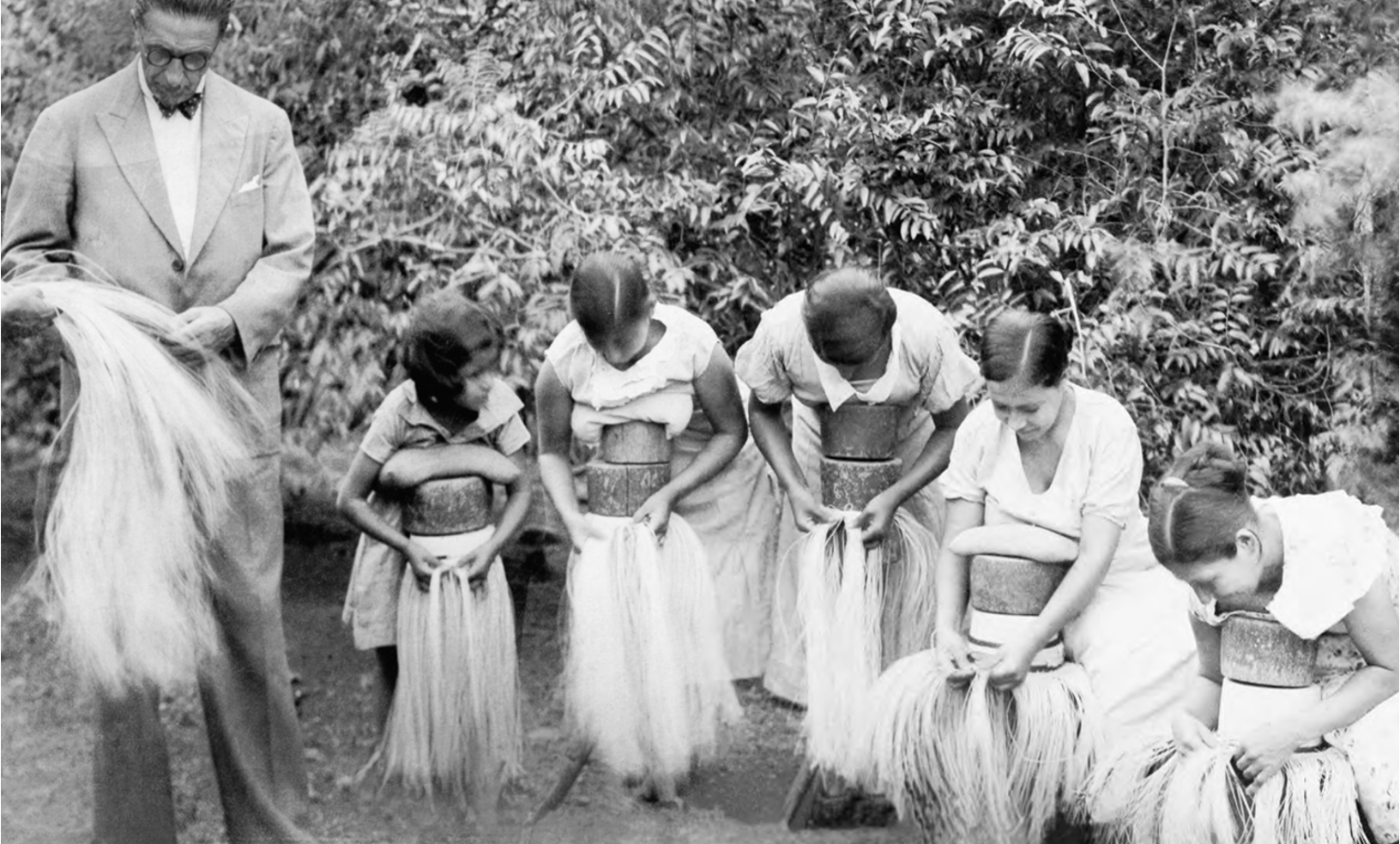
- Montubio weavers in Manabí Province

Total population
- 1,305,000; 7.4% of the Ecuadorian population (2022, census)

Regions with significant populations
- Los Ríos, Manabí, Guayas

Related ethnic groups
- Mestizos

Montubio is the term used to describe the mestizo people of the countryside of coastal Ecuador, especially the provinces of Manabí, Guayas, and Santa Elena. The government of Ecuador recognised montubio as an ethnic group in 2001, and allowed people to self-identify as montubio in the 2010 census.

== Classification ==
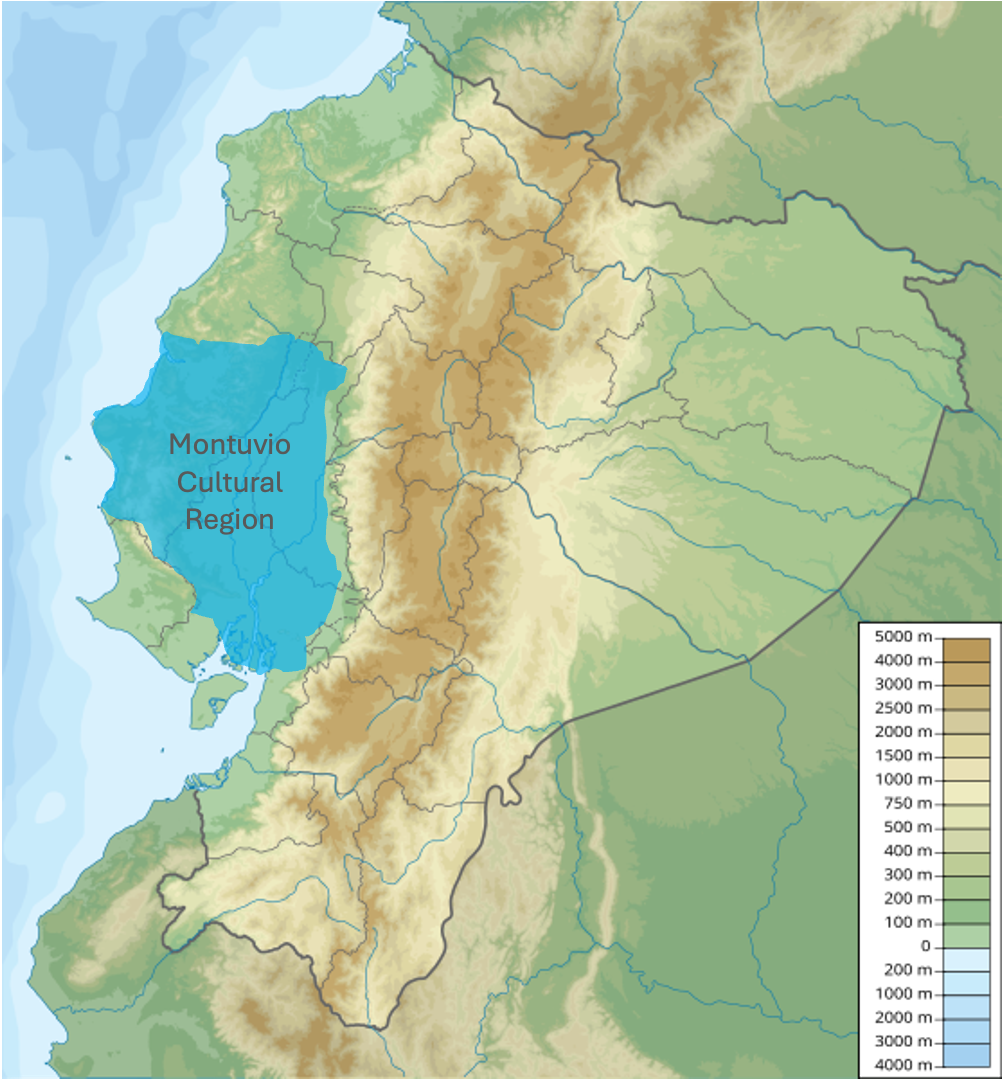
Montubio cultural region in Ecuador

Montubio is an ethnoracial classification for rural residents in coastal Ecuador that work the land. Montubio are primarily associated with the provinces of Manabí, Guayas, and Santa Elena. The cultural heritage of Montubio include indigenous, Spanish, and Afro-Ecuadorians.

Some montubios attempted to identify as members of the indigenous group Manta-Wankavilka in the 1990s, but the Confederation of Indigenous Nationalities of Ecuador rejected this attempt.

President Gustavo Noboa issued an executive degree to recognise montubios as an ethnic group in 2001, and the 2008 Constitution also recognised montubios as an ethnic group. Montubio was recognised as an ethnic group for the 2010 census in Ecuador.

== History ==
The Council for the Development of the Montubio Peoples of the Ecuadorian Coast and Subtropical Zones of the Coastal Region (CODEPMOC) was created by Noboa on 30 March 2001.

== Media ==
In the 1930s and 1940s the Guayaquil Group wrote about montubios in social realist works that were meant to expose the issues of poverty and rural-urban migration.

The television series Los Compadritos depicted montubios as brash and ridiculous. The main character of the television series Mi recinto is a montubio is depicted as having no self-control, especially towards women.

== Demographics ==
In the 2010 census 7.4% of the population self-identified as montubio (1 million people). The percentage of Ecuador that self-identified as white declined from 10.46% to 6.1% between the 2001 and 2010 censuses due to many montubios selecting white as their ethnicity in the 2001 census.

In the 2020 census 7.7% of the population identified as montubio (1.3 million people). Manabí contains 41% of Ecuador's montubio population, Guayas contains 28.3%, and Los Ríos contains 24.3%.

The illiteracy rate of montubio fell from 12.9% in 2010 to 8.4% in 2020.

== See also ==
- Cholo pescador

== Works cited ==
=== Books ===
- Friederic, Karin (2023). The Prism of Human Rights: Seeking Justice amid Gender Violence in Rural Ecuador. Rutgers University Press. ISBN 9781978835344.
- Novo, Carmen (2021). Undoing Multiculturalism: Resource Extraction and Indigenous Rights in Ecuador. University of Pittsburgh Press. ISBN 9780822946632.
- Smith, Kimbra (2015). Practically Invisible: Coastal Ecuador, Tourism, and the Politics of Authenticity. Vanderbilt University Press. ISBN 9780826520586.

=== Web ===
- "2020 Census". Instituto Nacional de Estadisticas y Censos. Archived from the original on 3 February 2026.
