= Indigenous peoples in Ecuador =

Indigenous peoples of Ecuador

Native Ecuadorians
Ecuatorianos Nativos (Spanish)
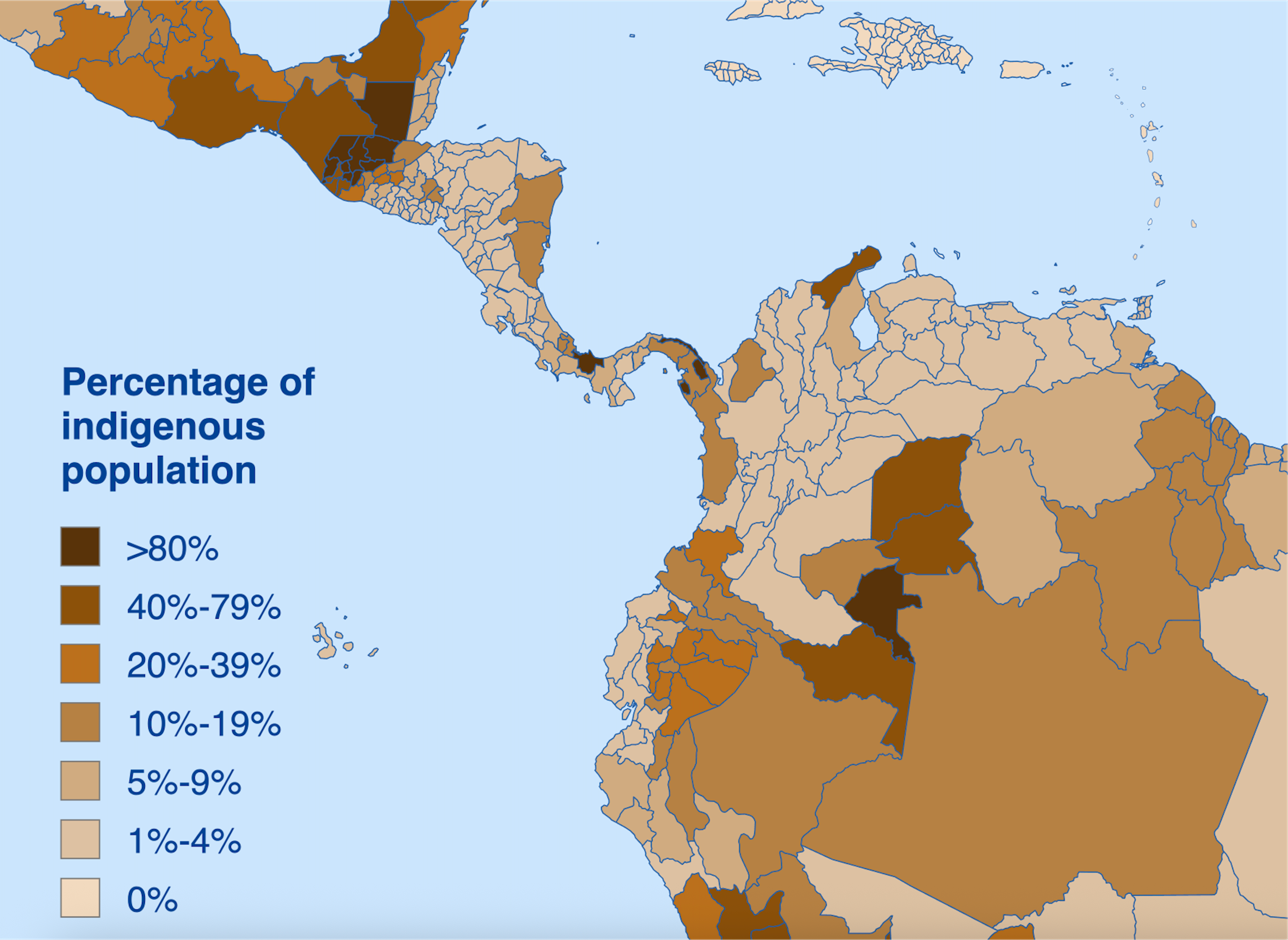
- Percentage of indigenous population showing the continuity between indigenous people in Ecuador and Colombia

Total population
- 1,301,887 (2022 census); 7.69% of the Ecuadorian population

Regions with significant populations
- Ecuador; Mainly: Sierra (Andean highlands) and Oriente (Eastern)
- (Pichincha Province) Pichincha: 192,585
- Chimborazo: 178,754
- (Imbabura Province) Imbabura: 131,586
- (Morona-Santiago Province) Morona-Santiago: 112,722
- (Cotopaxi Province) Cotopaxi: 111,444

Languages
- Kichwa language, Spanish, Achuar-Shiwiar, Cha'palaachi, Cofán, Tsachila, Cuaiquer, Secoya, Shuar, Siona, Tetete, Waorani

Religion
- Majority: Catholicism; Minority: Indigenous religion

Related ethnic groups
- Indigenous peoples of the Americas

The Indigenous peoples in Ecuador or Native Ecuadorians (Spanish: Ecuatorianos Nativos) are the groups of people who were present in what became Ecuador before the Spanish colonization of the Americas. The term also includes their descendants from the time of the Spanish conquest to the present. Their history, which encompasses the last 11,000 years, reaches into the present; 7 percent of Ecuador's population is of Indigenous heritage, while another 70 percent are Mestizos of mixed Indigenous and European heritage. Genetic analysis indicates that Ecuadorian Mestizos are of three-hybrid genetic ancestry.

== Archaeological periods ==
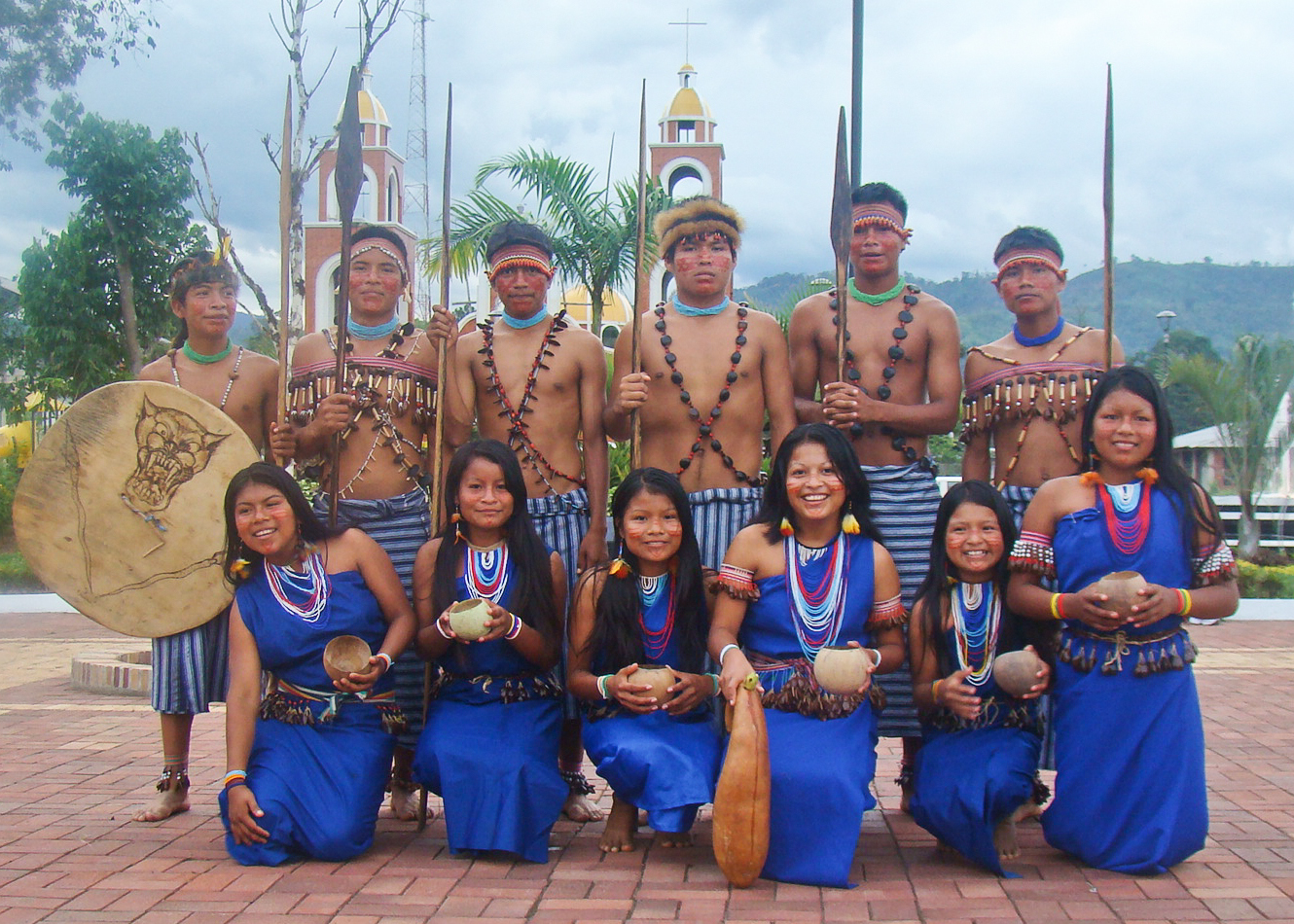
Shuar people in the park of Logroño, Morona-Santiago.

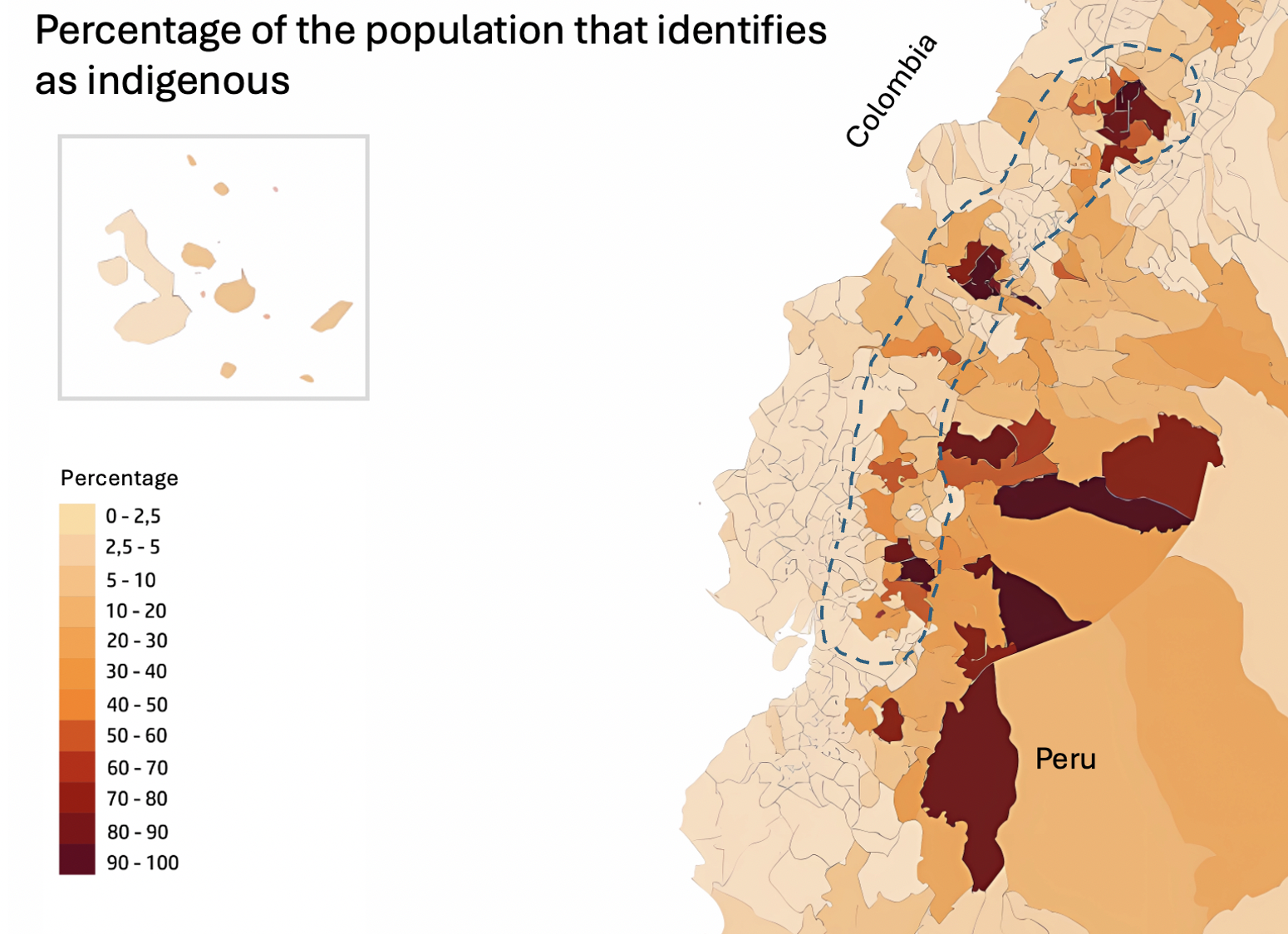
Percentage of the population that identifies as indigenous in Ecuador and the south of Colombia. Inside the dashed line are the Nasa, Pasto, Caranqui, Panzaleo and Puruha that spoke barbacoan languages (until it was lost in Ecuador)

While archaeologists have proposed different temporal models at different times, the schematic currently in use divides prehistoric Ecuador into five major time periods: Lithic, Archaic, Formative, Regional Development, and Integration. These time periods are determined by the cultural development of groups being studied, and are not directly linked to specific dates, e.g. through carbon dating.

The Lithic period encompasses the earliest stages of development, beginning with the culture that migrated into the American continents and continuing until the Late Pleistocene or Early Holocene. The people of this culture are known as Paleo-Indians, and the end of their era is marked by the extinction of the megafauna they hunted.

The Archaic period is defined as "the stage of migratory hunting and gathering cultures continuing into the environmental conditions approximating those of the present." During this period, hunters began to subsist on a wider variety of smaller game and increased their gathering activities. They also began domesticating plants such as maize and squash, probably at "dooryard gardens." In the Andean highlands, this period lasted from 7000-3500 BP.

The Formative Period is characterized by "the presence of agriculture, or any other subsistence economy of comparable effectiveness, and by the successful integration of such an economy into well-established, sedentary village life." In Ecuador, this period is also marked by the establishment of trade networks and the spread of different styles of pottery. It began in about 3500 and ended around 2200 BP.

Regional Development is the period, dating roughly 2200–1300 BP, of the civilizations of the Sierra, described as "localized but interacting states with complex ideologies, symbol systems, and social forms." The people of this period practiced metallurgy, weaving, and ceramics.

The Integration Period (1450 BP—450 BP) "is characterized by great cultural uniformity, the development of urban centres, class-based social stratification, and intensive agriculture." The Integration Period ends and the historic era begins with the Inca conquest.

=== Paleo-Indians ===
The oldest artifacts discovered in Ecuador are stone implements discovered at 32 Cotton Pre-ceramic (Paleolithic) archaeological sites in the Santa Elena Peninsula. They indicate a hunting and gathering economy, and date from the Late Pleistocene epoch, or about 11,000 years ago. These Paleo-Indians subsisted on the megafauna that inhabited the Americas at the time, which they hunted and processed with stone tools of their own manufacture.

Evidence of Paleoindian hunter-gatherer material culture in other parts of coastal Ecuador is isolated and scattered. Such artifacts have been found in the provinces of Carchi, Imbabura, Pichincha, Cotopaxi, Azuay, and Loja.

Despite the existence of these early coastal settlements, the majority of human settlement occurred in the Sierra (Andean) region, which was quickly populated. One such settlement, remains of which were found at the archaeological site El Inga, was centered at the eastern base of Mount Ilaló, where two basalt flows are located. Due to agricultural disturbances of archaeological remains, it has been difficult to establish a consistent timeline for this site. The oldest artifacts there discovered, however, date to 9,750 BP.

In the South, archaeological discoveries include stone artifacts and animal remains found in the Cave of Chobshi, located in the cantón of Sigsig, which date between 10,010 and 7,535 BP. Chobshi also provides evidence of the domestication of the dog. Another site, Cubilán, rests on the border between Azuay and Loja provinces. Scrapers, projectile points, and awls discovered there date between 9,060 and 9,100 BP, while vegetable remains are up to a thousand years older.

In the Oriente, human settlements have existed since at least 2450 BP. Settlements that probably date from this period have been found in the provinces of Napo, Pastaza, Sucumbíos, and Orellana. However, most of the evidence recovered in the Oriente suggest a date of settlement later than in the Sierra or the Coast.

=== Origins of agriculture ===
The end of the Ice Age brought changes to the flora and fauna, which led to the extinction of the large game hunted by Paleo-Indians, such as giant sloth, mammoth, and other Pleistocene megafauna. Humans adapted to the new conditions by relying more heavily on farming. The adoption of agriculture as the primary mode of subsistence was gradual, taking up most of the Archaic period. It was accompanied by cultural changes in burial practices, art, and tools.

The first evidence of agriculture dates anywhere from the Preboreal Holocene (10,000 years ago) to the Atlantic Holocene (6,000 years ago).

Some of the first farmers in Ecuador were the Las Vegas culture of the Santa Elena Peninsula/, who, in addition to making use of the abundant piscine resources, also contributed to the domestication of several beneficial plant species, including squash. They engaged in ritual burial and intensive gardening.

The Valdivia culture, an outgrowth of the Las Vegas culture, was an important early civilization. While archaeological finds in Brazil and elsewhere have supplanted those at Valdivia as the earliest-known ceramics in the Americas, the culture retains its importance due to its formative role in Amerindian civilization in South America, which is analogous to the role of the Olmeca in Mexico. Most of the ceramic shards from the Early Valdivia date to about 4,450 BP (although some may be from up to 6,250 BP), with artifacts from the later period of the civilization dating from about 3,750 BP. Ceramics were utilitarian, but also produced pieces of very original art, like the small feminine figures referred to as "Venuses."

The Valdivia people farmed maize, a large bean (now rare) of the Canavalia family, cotton, and achira (Canna edulis). Indirect evidence suggests that maté, coca, and manioc were also cultivated. They also consumed substantial amounts of fish. Archaeological evidence from the Late Valdivia shows a decline in life expectancy to approximately 21 years. This decline is attributed to an increase in infectious disease, accumulation of waste, water pollution, and a deterioration in diet, all of which are associated with agriculture itself.

In the Sierra, people cultivated locally developed crops, including tree bean Erythrina edulis, potatoes, quinoa, and tarwi. They also farmed crops that originated in the coastal regions and in the North, including ají, peanuts, beans, and maize. Animal husbandry kept pace with agricultural development, with the domestication of the local animals llama, alpaca, and the guinea pig, as well as the coastal Muscovy duck. The domestication of camelids during this period laid the basis for the pastoral tradition that continues to this day.

In the Oriente, evidence of maize cultivation discovered at Lake Ayauchi dates from 6250 BP. In Morona-Santiago province, evidence of Regional Development period culture was discovered at the Upano Valley sites of Faldas de Sangay, also known as the Sangay Complex or Huapula, as well as at other nearby sites. These people created ceramics, farmed, and hunted and gathered. They also built large earthen mounds, the smallest of which were used for agriculture or housing, and the largest of which had ceremonial functions. The hundreds of mounds spread over a twelve square kilometer area at Sangay demonstrate that the Oriente was capable of supporting large populations. The lack of evidence of kings or "principal" chiefs and also challenges the notion that cultural creations such as monuments require centralized authority.

=== Development of metallurgy ===
The period from 2450 BP—1450 BP is known as the "Regional Development" period, and is marked by the development of metalworking skills. The artisans of La Tolita, an island in the estuary of the Santiago River, made alloys of platinum and gold, fashioning the material into miniatures and masks. The Jama-Coaque, Bahía, Guangala, and Jambalí also practiced metalwork in other areas of the Ecuadorian coast. These goods were traded though mercantile networks.

=== Pre-Inca era ===
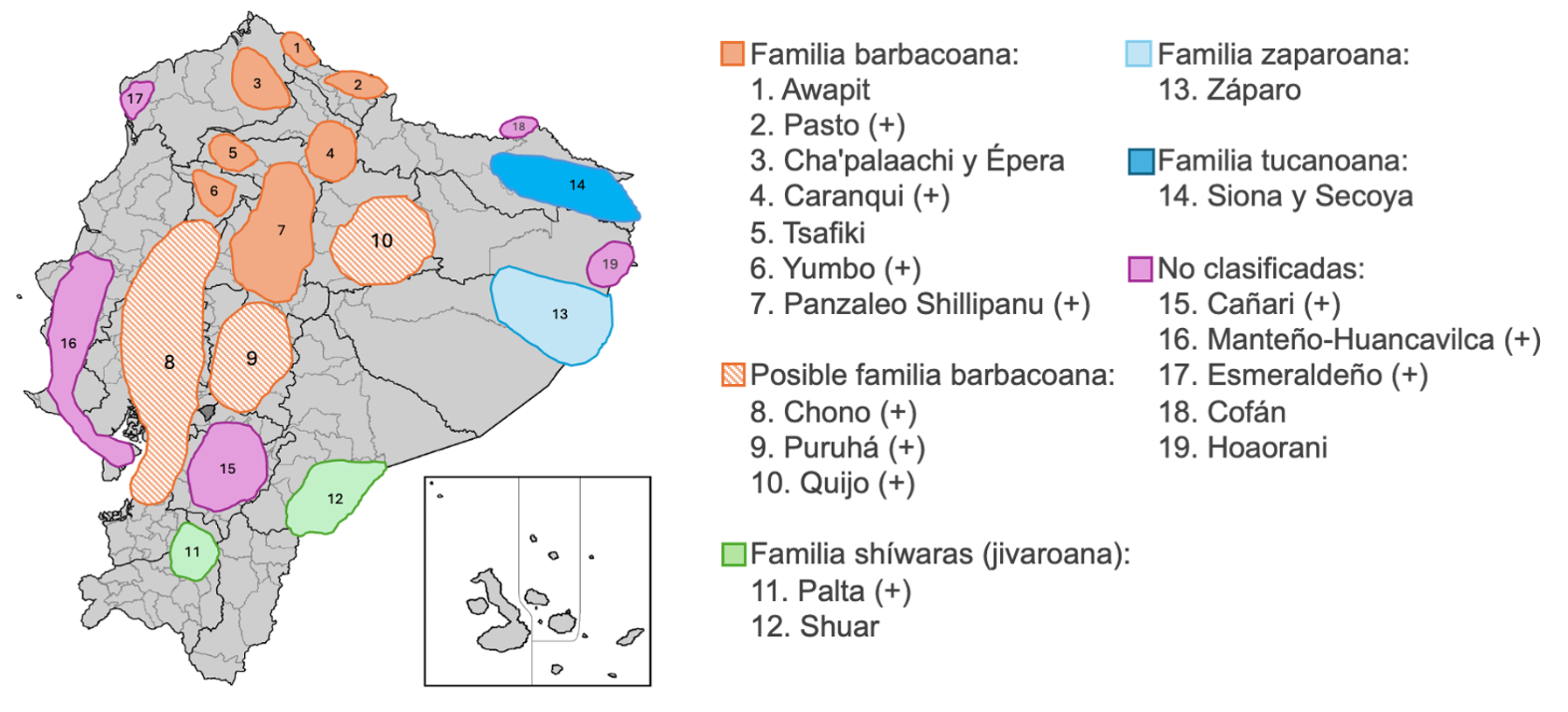
Map showing the indigenous languages spoken in Ecuador in the Pre-Inca era

Prior to the invasion of the Inca, the Indigenous societies of Ecuador had complex and diverse social, cultural, and economic systems. The ethnic groups of the central Sierra were generally more advanced in organizing farming and commercial activities, and the peoples of the Coast and the Oriente generally followed their lead, coming to specialize in processing local materials into goods for trade.

The coastal peoples continued the traditions of their predecessors on the Santa Elena peninsula. They include the Machalilla, and later the Chorrera, who refined the ceramicism of the Valdivia culture.

The economy of the peoples of the Oriente was essentially silvicultural, although horticulture was practiced. They extracted dyes from the achiote plant for face paint, and curare poisons for blowgun darts from various other plants. Complex religious systems developed, many of which incorporated (or perhaps originated from) the use of hallucinogenic plants such as Datura and Banisteriopsis. They also made coil ceramics. In the Sierra, the most important groups were the Pasto, the Caras, the Panzaleo, the Puruhá, the Cañari, and the Palta. They lived on hillsides, terrace farming maize, quinoa, beans, potatoes and squash, and developed systems of irrigation. Their political organization was a dual system: one of chieftains, the other, a land-holding system called curacazgo, that regulated the planting and harvesting of multiple cycles of crops. While some historians have referred to this system as the "Kingdom of Quito", it did not approach the level of political organization of the state.

==== Economy ====
Using the system of multicyclic agriculture, which allowed them to have year-long harvests of a wide variety of crops by planting at a variety of altitudes and at different times, the Sierra people flourished. Generally, an ethnic group farmed the mountainside nearest to it. Cities began to specialize in the production of goods, agricultural and otherwise. For this reason, the dry valleys, where cotton, coca, ají (chili peppers), indigo, and fruits could be grown and where salt could be produced, gained economic importance. Sometimes, tribes farmed lands outside their immediate purview. These goods were then traded in a two-tiered market system.

Free commerce took place in markets called "tianguez", and was the means by which ordinary individuals fulfilled their need for tubers, maize, and cotton. Directed commerce, however, was undertaken by specialists called mindala under the auspices of a curaca. They also exchanged goods at the tianguez, but specialized in products that had ceremonial purposes, such as coca, salt, gold, and beads. Seashells were sometimes used as currency in places such as Pimampiro in the far North. Salt was used in other parts of the Sierra, and in other places where salt was abundant, such as Salinas.

In this manner, the Pasto and the Caras undertook their existence in the Chota Valley, the Puruhá in the Chanchán riverbasin, and the Panzaleos in the Patate and Guayallabamba valleys.

In the coastal lowlands, the Esmeralda, the Manta, the Huancavilca, and the Puná were the four major groups. They were seafarers, but also practiced agriculture and trade, both with each other and with peoples of the Sierra. The most important commodity they provided, however, were Spondylus shells, which was a symbol of fertility. In areas such as Guayas and Manabí, small beads called chiquira were used as currency.

Also following the lead of the Sierra peoples, the people of the Oriente began congregating around sites where cotton, coca, salt, and beads could be more easily produced for trade. Tianguez developed in the Amazon forest, and were visited by mindala from the Sierra.

==== Political organization ====
The extended family, in which polygyny was common, was the basic unit of society. The extended family group is referred to by the Kichwa word "ayllu", although this type of organization predates the arrival of Quechua speakers. Two political systems were built on the basis of the ayllu: the curacazgo and the cacicazgo. Each curacazgo is made up of one or more ayllu. The Ecuadorian ayllus, unlike in the Southern Andes, were small, made up of only about 200 people, although the larger ones could reach up to 1,200 members. Each ayllu had its own authority, although each curaca also answered to a chief (cacique), who exercised power over the curacazgo. The cacique's power depended on his ability to mobilize manual labor, and was sustained by his ability to distribute highly-valued goods to the members of his curaca.

==== Religion ====
Local beliefs and practices co-existed those practiced regionally, which allowed each ethnic group to maintain its own religious identity while interacting, especially commercially, with neighboring groups. Some regional commonalities were the solar calendar, which marked the solstices and equinoxes, and veneration of the sun, moon, and maize.

== Inca conquest ==
The Inca empire expanded into what later became Ecuador during the reign of Pachacuti Inca Yupanqui, who began the northward conquest in 1463. He gave his son Topa control of the army, and Topa conquered the Quitu and continued coastward. Upon arriving, he undertook a sea voyage to either the Galápagos or the Marquesas Islands. Upon his return, he was unable to subdue the people of Puná Island and the Guayas coast. His son Huayna Capac, however, was able to subsequently conquer these peoples, consolidating Ecuador into "Tawantinsuyu", the Inca Empire.

Many tribes resisted the imperial encroachment, in particular the Cañari in the south, near modern-day Cuenca, and the Caras and the Quitu in the North. However, the Inca language and social structures came to predominate, particularly in the Sierra. To reduce the opposition to their rule, one of the Inca's tactics included uprooting groups of Quechua-speakers loyal to the empire and resettling them in areas that offered resistance, a system called mitma. The Saraguros in Loja province may have their origin from mitmas relocated from other parts of the Inca Empire.

Some scholars dispute the Inca heritage of Indigenous people of Ecuador.

== Spanish conquest ==
The untimely death of Incan ruler Huayna Capac in 1527, likely of smallpox, left uncertainty about his successor. His sons, Huascar and Atahualpa fought for control, weakening the empire just prior to the Spanish conquest starting in 1532.

In 1532, the Spanish conquistador Francisco Pizarro arrived on the shores of Peru after having gained permission, weapons, and soldiers from the King of Spain to conquer the land. Pizarro arranged to have a meeting with the Incan ruler, Atahualpa, who had recently defeated his brother in the Incan civil war. Instead of the planned negotiation, Pizarro instead murdered the Incan guards and took Atahualpa captive. Despite a large ransom being paid for his safe return, Atahualpa was executed in 1533.

With the use of armor, horses, and guns, the Incan empire soon fell to Spanish control, though they were met with pockets of fierce resistance. At the time of the arrival of the first columns of Spanish conquistadores, the population of the present day territories of Ecuador is believed to border one million inhabitants. This might have been the result of epidemics of smallpox and diptheria that spread in the Andes after the first contacts with Spanish explorers.

== Republican era ==
=== Rubber boom ===
The 19th century marked a time in history when the need for rubber came into high demand in the world. Many Western Territories including America wanted to produce Rubber Industries in desire to produce economic prosperity. They also expressed an alternative goal, which was to also make better the region they will be in partnership with by improving their land and their economic status as well. Reasons as to why they decided to obtain partnership with the Amazonian region was for multiple reasons. One of the reasons was that the location was ideal. Two of the most high quality rubber trees grew in that region; the Hevea tree and the Castilloa. tree the Hevea tree was only able to be used 6 month out of the year while the Castilloa was able to be used the whole year. To begin the trading system, the Western territories began to obtain discourse with the Mestizos of the land which were known to be the more prestigious of the different groups residing in Ecuador. They became highly tied into the trading system that was created. There was fast money involved in this system that attracted the Mestizos. Economic prosperity seemed promising. As the rubber industry flourished many other factors came to surface in the system of Rubber production. Because of the high demand for rubber at the time, the Mestizos who became known as the Caucheros (rubber barons) decided that they needed to obtain an abundant number of workers that would work for low wages. The Indigenous population soon came to mind because of a couple of factors. One was due to the fact that they seemed the best fit to perform the labor. They knew the lands on which they would work because of their long history of living on the land. They were well adapted to the climate and familiar with means of survival like hunting and gathering. The enslavement of the Indigenous people soon became an epidemic. Natives were taken from their homes by the Muchachos, a group of afro-ecuadorian men hired by the Caucheros to do the dirty work. They were in turn forced to work in the rubber industries by fear and intimidation and were put on a rubber quota with time constraints and were expected to meet the demands.

If the quotas were not met they were punished. Punishments by the Muchachos were very severe and brutal. Common punishments including flogging, hanging, and being locked in the stocks. Being put in the stocks included being chained in pain inflicting positions and left without food and water for an extended period of time. More extreme punishments included the shooting workers if they tried to escape or became too ill to work. The pay for their hard labor was minimal. They were put on what was called a debt-penoage where they had to work for a long period of time in order to gain funds to pay back debt they owned to the Caucheros for supplies that they were given for their daily tasks such as tools to work, clothes, and food. The low compensation for their labor often led to working their whole life for the rubber barons. They usually received a small item that they were able to keep, like a hammock, and the rest was given straight to the employer. There was very little Government intervention thanks to bribery that got local officials to overlook what was occurring and the fear of being attacked by the Amerindians. The end of the Rubber Boom was in 1920 when the prices of rubber dropped. The enslavement of the Indigenous people ceased with the end of the rubber boom.

=== Petroleum operations ===
The year 1978 marked the beginning of petroleum production in Ecuador. Texaco is documented to be the primary international oil company that was given permission to export oil from the coast of Ecuador. This company managed the oil operation from 1971 to 1992. The Ecuadorian government along with Texaco began to scout the Oriente in a joint business known as a consortium. Major shipments of oil were put into action in 1972 after the Trans-Ecuadorian Pipeline was finished. In the years of production business in oil production increased rapidly and Ecuador soon became the second largest producer of oil in South America.

Texaco's contract for oil production in Ecuador expired in 1992. PetroEcuador then took over 100% of the oil production management. 1.5 billion barrels of crude oil was reported to have been extracted while under the management of Texaco. There were also reports of 19 billion gallons of waste that had been dumped into the natural environment with the absence of any monitoring or overseeing to prevent damages to the surrounding areas. In addition there was a report of 16.8 million gallons of crude that was dispersed into the environment in relation to spillage out of the Trans-Ecuadorian pipeline.

In the early 1990s a lawsuit led by Ecuadorian government officials of 1.5 billion dollars was presented against the Texaco company with claims that there was an immense pollution epidemic that led to the demise of many natural environments as well as an increase in human illnesses. A cancer study was conducted in 1994 by the Centre for Economic and Social Rights which found a rise in health concerns in the Ecuadorian region. it was found that there was a notably higher incidence of cancer in women and men in the countries where there was oil production present for over 20 years. Women also reported increased rates in a copious number of physical ailments such as skin mycosis, sore throat, headaches and gastritis. The primary argument against these findings were that they were weak and biased. Texaco decided on jurisdiction in Ecuador. The case put against Texaco remained in the works for some time. In 2001, Texaco was taken over by Chevron, another oil company, which assumed the liabilities left by the previous production. In February 2011 Chevron was found guilty after inheriting the case left by Texaco and was said to be required to pay 9 billion dollars in damages. This is known to be one of the largest environmental lawsuits award recorded.

=== Ethnic Wage Gap in Ecuador ===
Ecuador has a history of Spanish colonization of Indigenous people that were enslaved, abused, and exploited. Eventually the country adapted the French Neo-Lamarck ideology leading to "mestizaje". This "mestizaje" began in the 16th century where European colonizers had children with Indigenous people. Ecuador's historical background has left the country with a very stratified social environment. This is the nucleus of the stratification of different social classes in Ecuador. There have been many attempts to reduce such stratification such as making Indigenous languages official in 1998. The Republic of Ecuador also self claimed itself plurinational and intercultural in 2008. It is essential to understand the causes of such racial inequality in a given society in order to be able to approach the problem. Understanding the root of the problems also allows us to understand the existence or lack of public policy initiatives. Structuralist explanations for such inequality is supported by both the minority and dominant groups. Although 19.5% of Ecuadorians believe the economic inequality between the races is due to insufficient work effort from minorities, 47.0% believe it arises from discrimination.

Unfortunately, the widest gap of income inequality in the world is in Latin America. The difference in economic division across ethnicities is a consequence of human capital and discrimination. It can be concluded through research that Indigenous people in Ecuador are predisposed to live in poverty and be discriminated against. The percent of Indigenous population in Ecuador that lives in poverty differs by 4.5 times that of the non-Indigenous population. Education is one of the greatest factors for such economical inequality in the country. The lack of education for many Indigenous people makes it difficult for the ethnic group to overcome such poverty. Unfortunately, the probability of Indigenous people to stay in school is very low. It is evident that there is an existing difference in education between the ethnic groups. The Indigenous population only has an average of 4.5 years of formal education, while non-Indigenous population's average of years is 8. The minority group has a net secondary school enrollment rate of 14.0% and because of rural residence and work they have a much lower probability of staying in school.

There is also a drastic social impact on Indigenous people mainly through exclusion. This racism raised the use of certain terminology such as "cholo" and "longo" which are threatening because they are not institutionalized to any official ethnic group. With such unhistorical and unstructured rise to the terminology, the terminology is more flexible when used and persistent. The paternalistic system of ethnic discrimination transitioned to a more democratization of racial relations. Although there are no more "haciendas" (working systems where Indigenous peoples were exploited for labor) and Amerindians now have a right to vote, there is still an everyday discriminatory challenge. Amerindians often feel vulnerable and predisposed to physical and verbal attacks, which cause them to be more reserved and avoid contact with whites. An Indigenous witness claimed he was told to leave a restaurant because "no Indians [were] admitted to [that] locale". Racism can be seen such as travelling in public transportation, interactions in public spaces, and the yearning to be white from Amerindians.

=== Mining Conflicts ===
Over the last 30 years various Indigenous groups have faced land and extractivism conflicts due to foreign and domestic mining interests. In 2010 a Chinese mining consortium called CRCC-Tongguan acquired a Canadian mining firm called Corriente resources which owned some of Ecuador's largest copper mines through its subsidiaries EcuaCorriente SA and Explocobres SA. According to researchers for the Carnegie Endowment for International Peace, Cintia Quiliconi and Pablo Rodriquez Vasco, their goal was as such: to "[diversify] their supply of metals while reducing the monopoly power of Western multinational companies such as Broken Hill Proprietary (BHP, formerly known as BHP Billiton), the International Minerals Corporation, Rio Tinto, Vale, Anglo American, and others." Gaining control of these mines would allow the consortium to achieve its goals of dominating the world market and expanding its metal supplies. The consortium was owned and operated by two companies owned and regulated by the Chinese government, the Tongling Nonferrous Metals Group and the China Railway Construction Corporation.

The subsidiaries of Corriente resources each own one of Ecuador's two biggest copper mining concessions respectively. EcuaCorriente SA owns the Mirador concession, a 10,000 hectare plot of land located in the Zamora Chinchipe province. The Mirador mine began operating in 2019 initially producing about 10,000 tons of copper a day. The San Carlos Panantza concession which is owned by Explocobres SA is a 28,548 hectare plot of land located in the Morona Santiago province in the Arutam region. Both of these concessions are located on the ancestral lands of the indigenous Ecuadorian peoples known as the Shuar. The ancestral lands of the Shuar stretch along the Cordillera del Cóndor, a mountain range that stretches along the southeastern border of Ecuador and Peru and into the Amazon rainforest. Of the 900,688 hectares of land that are ancestral to the Shuar, only 718,220 are recognized by the Ecuadorian government.

The Mirador project located in the town of Tundayme was targeted by the consortium because of the town's diverse ethnic make-up. The town had 737 residents with only 147 of whom identifying as Shuar, meaning that the consortium would face far less local opposition from Indigenous people to their operations. The acquisition of the Mirador concession by Corriente Resources began well before the purchase of the company by CRCC-Tongguan. Corriente resources struck informal deals with local leaders directly bypassing the Ecuadorian state, taking advantage of its lack of oversight of rural areas. These practices are illegal in Ecuador and as Quiliconi and Vasco explain, they served to fragment local communities by striking deals with specific local leaders creating opposition in the wider community. These practices were later continued following CRCC-Tongguan's acquisition of Corriente Resources. Using these practices Corriente was able to strike deals with the non indigenous inhabitants of Tundayme who were far less concerned with the intrinsic natural value of the land than its Shuar residents.

For the residents of Tundayme that would not sell their land, the consortium turned to far more aggressive tactics. According to Quiliconi and Vasco, "EcuaCorriente SA, unlike its Canadian predecessor, also leveraged the full support of the Ecuadorian state, which ordered the displacement of these locals by deploying security forces while citing Ecuador's laws on public safety." When the consortium's manipulation tactics failed they turned to aggressive force, strong-arming the state to push its residents off of their land, even going as far as to destroy a local school and church in 2014. Also in 2014 a local Shuar leader, José tendetza wrote a letter to CRCC-Tongguan criticizing their operations. Following this letter, Tendetza received multiple threats culminating in his torture and murder, a crime which has yet to be investigated.

In 2018 a group called the Amazon Community of Social Action in Cordillera del Condor) sued the consortium in Ecuador's lower courts, arguing that the mining operations were taking place of the ancestral lands of the Shuar people but the case was thrown out. CASCOMI is currently trying to sue the consortium in Ecuador's higher courts.

The San Carlos Panantza concession is located in the Arutam region. Unlike Mirador in Tundayme, Arutam is inhabited predominantly by Shuar peoples which made the consortiums divide and conquer tactics far less effective. Due to far larger and more united opposition, the consortium through Explocobres SA used even more aggressive tactics than those used in Mirador but to a far greater extent. In 2016 Explocobres SA began an operation involving over 2000 Ecuadorian police and military to forcibly evict residents of the San Juan Bosco canton. These tactics instilled fear into the inhabitants of the surrounding areas as well. The residents of the town of Nankints were told they had to evacuate or face similar force. When they tried to return to their homes, over 41 residents were arrested on "terrorism" charges. When other residents tried to return they faced military opposition including tanks and helicopters, resulting in multiple deaths and many injuries. Due to these widely disproportionate uses of force which made international news coverage, CASCOMI was able to seek relief with the Ecuadorian courts. In 2022, Ecuador's high court revoked mining rights to the San Carlos-Panantza concession.

=== Politics ===
In 1986, Indigenous people formed a national political organization, the Confederation of Indigenous Nationalities of Ecuador (CONAIE), which has been the primary political organization ever since. The CONAIE has been influential in national politics, including the ouster of the presidents Abdalá Bucaram in 1997 and Jamil Mahuad in 2000.

In 1998, Ecuador signed and ratified the current international law concerning Indigenous peoples, Indigenous and Tribal Peoples Convention, 1989. It was adopted in 1989 as the International Labour Organization Convention 169.

== Demographics and language ==
=== Demographics ===
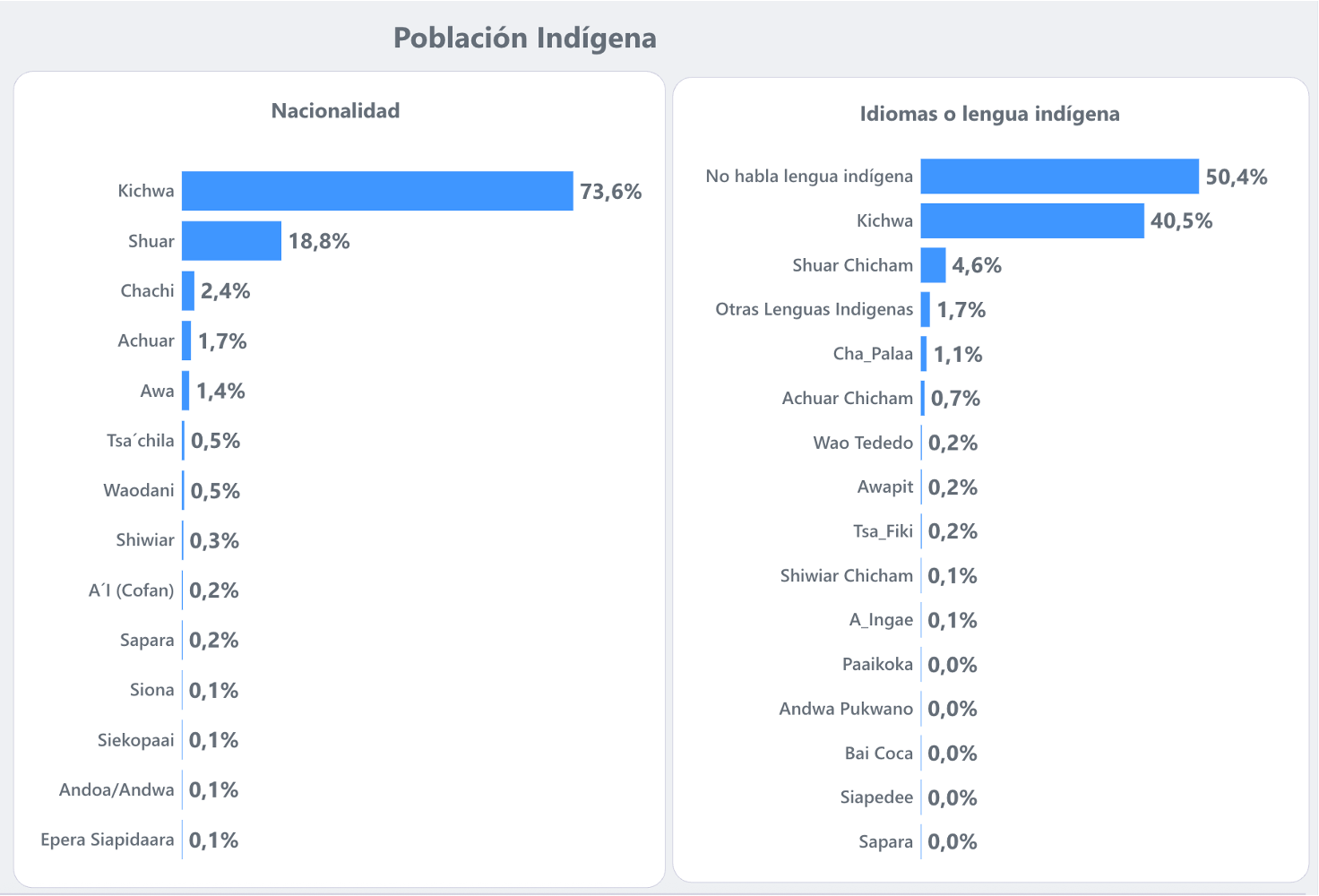
Distribution of indigenous "nationalities" and proportion of the indigenous population (circa 1'302.057 people or 7.7% of the total) that speaks an indigenous language.

Ethnographic estimations have been carried out based on censuses throughout Ecuador's history. The first recorded census was in 1778, when Ecuador was then the Royal Audience of Quito. This took place during the presidency of Juan José de Villalengua, and it was estimated that out of a total population of about 439,000 people, 63% of the population was Indigenous, 26% white, and the remaining 11% were "castas," meaning various mixtures of Indigenous people, whites, and Afro-descendants.

The next census was conducted during the republican era by Vicente Ramón Roca and José María Urbina. It counted a total of 869,892 people, of whom 49% were Amerindians, 40% were white, 10% were mulatto, and 1% were black. This census is of great importance as it allows for the study of the period of population transition experienced in Ecuador from 1846 after the Marcist Revolution to 1889 at the beginning of the Liberal Revolution.

The subsequent census that included an ethnographic estimation was in 1950, during the government of Galo Plaza Lasso. It determined that the total population was about 2,551,540 Ecuadorians. Based on an estimation by language, 11.12% were Indigenous people who spoke Kichwa, a product of a mestizaje process, while Spanish in 1950 was the predominant language nationally, spoken as a mother tongue by about 88.4% of the population. In that same context, a high illiteracy rate (36.1%) was recorded.

From 2001 onwards, censuses were conducted using self-identification criteria, meaning that during data collection, respondents were asked to identify with an ethnic group. In that year, approximately 12 million Ecuadorians were counted, of whom 77.4% self-identified as mestizo, 6.8% as Indigenous, 5% as Afro-Ecuadorian, and 10.5% as white. Starting in 2010, Montuvios began to be included in this group; while genetically mestizo, they were considered an ethnic category and recognized as a distinct culture. In the latest Population and Housing Census of 2022, the majority of the population self-identified, according to their culture and customs, as mestizo (77.5%), followed by those who considered themselves Montuvios (7.7%), Indigenous (7.7%), Afro-Ecuadorians (4.8%), and white (2.2%).

=== Language ===
According to the last Census of 2022, of the 7.7% of the population that identifies as indigenous, 3.2% speak an indigenous language. From a total indigenous population of 1'302.057 people, 50,4% of them do not speak an indigenous language, the majority of them belonging however to the Kichwa nationality. In absolute numbers, that 3.2% of the population amounts to 645.821 people that speak an indigenous language. The distribution is the following:

- Kichwa with 527,333 speakers, making up 40.5% of the total indigenous population.
- Shuar with 59,894 speakers, making up 4.6% of the total indigenous population.
- Other languages with 58,594 speakers, making up 4.5% of the total indigenous population.

The other languages spoken in Ecuador include Awapit (spoken by the Awá), A'ingae (spoken by the Cofan), Achuar Chicham (spoken by the Achuar), Shiwiar (spoken by the Shiwiar), Cha'palaachi (spoken by the Chachi), Tsa'fiki (spoken by the Tsáchila), Paicoca (spoken by the Siona and Secoya), and Wao Tededeo (spoken by the Waorani).

== See also ==
- Dolores Cacuango, Ecuadorian Indigenous rights activist
