= Ecuadorian census =

The Ecuadorian census is conducted by the governmental institution known as INEC, Instituto Nacional de Estadisticas y Censos (National Institute of Statistics and Census). The census in Ecuador is conducted every 10 years, and its objective is to obtain the number of people residing within its borders. The current census now includes household information.

The most recent census (as of 2011) emphasized reaching rural and remote areas to map the most accurate population count in the country. The 2010 census was conducted in November and December, and its results were published January 27, 2011.

== Demographics ==
The following table shows the dates the most recent censuses were made, and the total population number:

Recent Ecuadorian censuses
No.	Date	Population	Density	Change since previous census
1	Census 2001	12,156,608	53.8	
2	Census 2010	14,306,876	55.8	+14%

=== Growth ===
Index of growth:

Percentage of population growth (census periods)
No.	Time lapse	Growth percentile
1	1950–1962	2.96%
2	1962–1974	3.10%
3	1974–1982	2.62%
4	1982–1990	2.19%
5	1990–2001	2.05%
6	2001–2010	1.52%
