= Guayas River =

River in Ecuador

Guayas River Rio Guayas
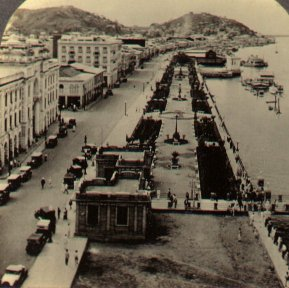
- The Guayas River in Guayaquil, 1920

- Location of mouth

Location
- Country: Ecuador
- Province: Guayas Province

Physical characteristics
- Mouth
  - location: Gulf of Guayaquil, Pacific Ocean
  - coordinates: 2°39′05″S 79°54′33″W
  - elevation: 0 m (0 ft)
- Length: 437 km (272 mi) Guayas - Rio Babahoyo- Rio Vinces - Rio Quevedo - Rio Bajaña; 387 km (240 mi) Guayas - Rio Daule; 305 km (190 mi) Guayas - Rio Babahoyo; 61 km (38 mi) Guayas River from the confluence of Rio Daule and Rio Babahoyo
- Basin size: 34,500 km^{2} (13,300 sq mi)
- Discharge
  - average: 2,000 m^{3}/s (71,000 cu ft/s)

The Guayas River (Rio Guayas) is a major river in western Ecuador. It gives its name to the Guayas Province of Ecuador. Its total length including Rio Quevedo and Rio Bajaña is 437 km (241 mi) long. The Guayas River's drainage basin is 34,500 km^{2} (13,320 sq.mi) and it has an average discharge of 71,000 cu ft/s (2,000 m³/s).

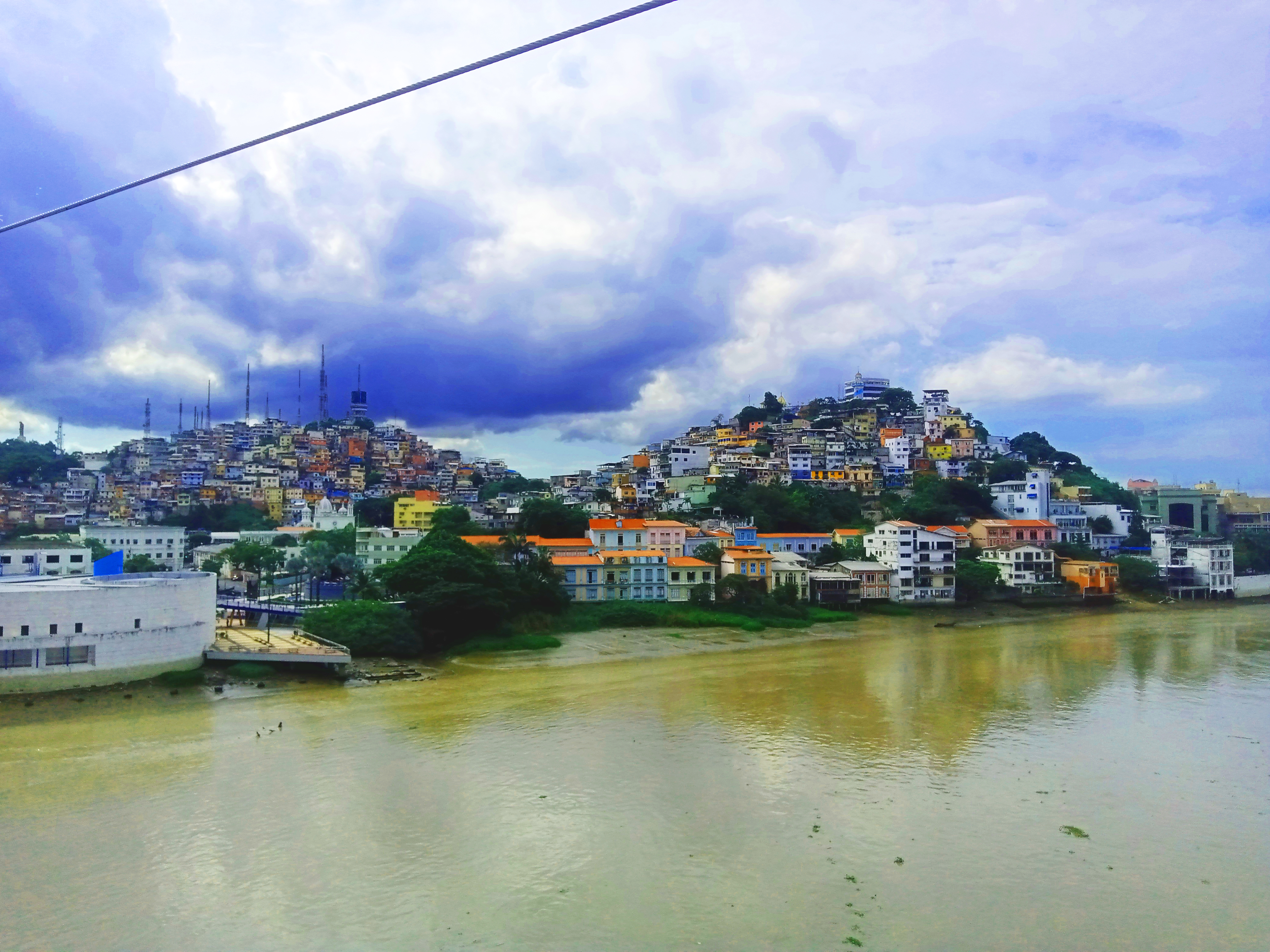
Guayas River in Guayaquil

It is the national river of Ecuador and is present on the coat of arms of Ecuador.

== Geography ==
=== Course ===
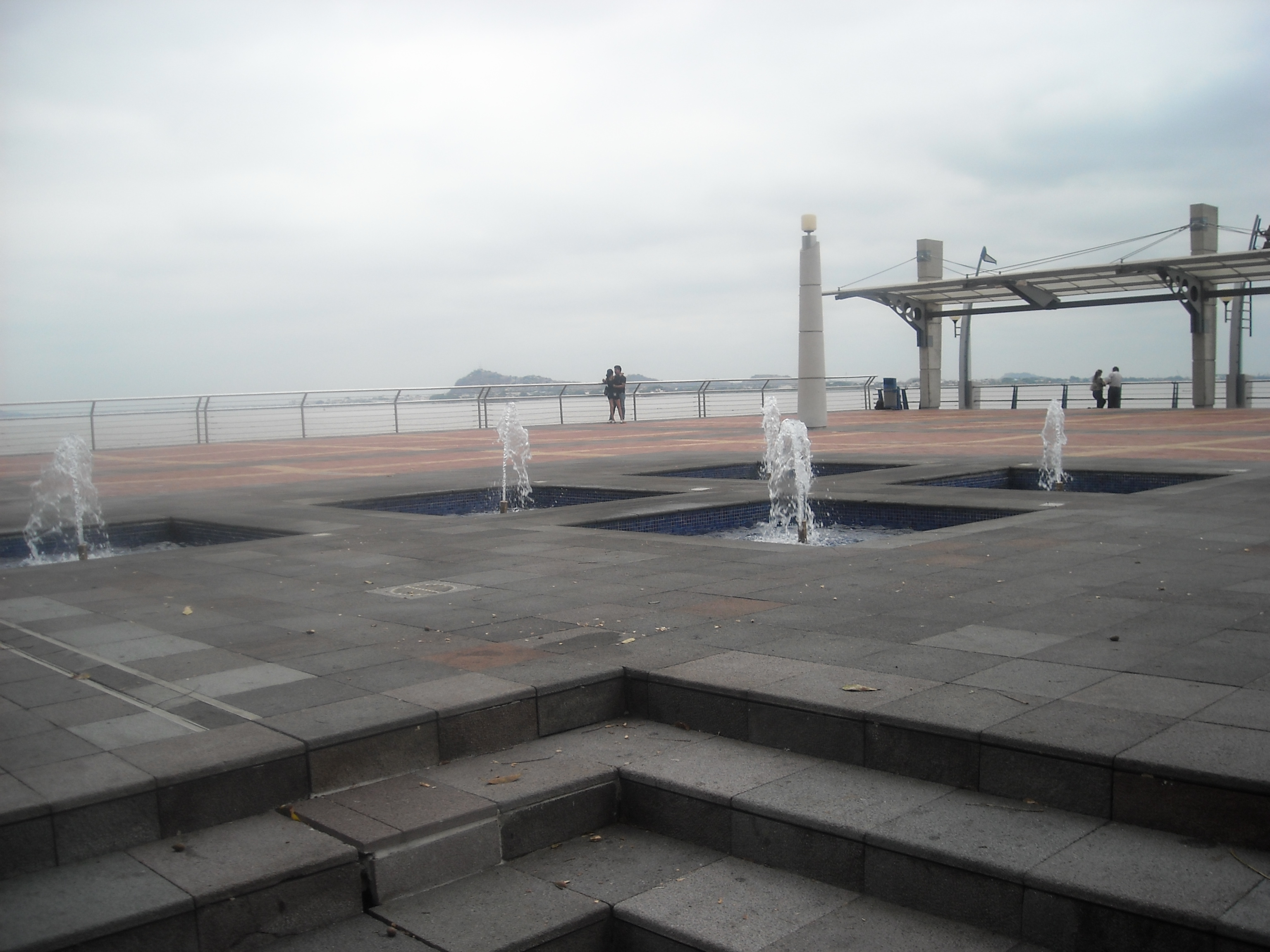
Malecón on Guayas River

The Guayas River has one of its sources in the Andes Mountains and Chimborazo, Ecuador's highest volcano. The coat of arms of Ecuador shows an image of the river descending from the mountain. Guayas is the name of the lower part of the river, which starts at the confluence of the Daule River from the west and the Babahoyo River from the east, between the cities of Guayaquil and Durán, in Guayas Province. The Guayas River then flows around Santay Island, and becomes one current again. From the confluence to the delta 60 kilometers away, it borders Guayaquil Canton and Durán Canton, and Guayaquil Canton and Naranjal Canton, just before the delta.

=== Delta ===
The Guayas River forms a very complex delta. Its most important feature is the existence of a slough called Estero Salado, surrounded by swamps and affected by tides. The area between the Guayas River and the Estero Salado forms a maze of islands, some of which have been transformed into slums. The Cobina Slough connects the Estero Salado with the river.

The main course of the river is affected by tides, and forms a small group of islands; the most important of them is Mondragón. The river then meets the Gulf of Guayaquil, an inlet of the Pacific Ocean. Its influence is noticeable in the Puná Island, and in the Jambelí Strait, in the province of El Oro.

=== Watershed ===
The Guayas River has the largest watershed in South America west of the Andes Mountains that flows into the Pacific Ocean. It has an area 34,500 km^{2}, in nine provinces: Los Ríos, Guayas, Bolívar, Manabí, Cañar, Pichincha, Azuay, Chimborazo and Cotopaxi. In collaboration with the Estero Salado, the river discharges 36 billion cubic meters of water into the Gulf of Guayaquil every year.

== Cities along the river ==
=== Cities along the Daule River ===
- Pichincha
- Balzar
- Colimes
- Palestina
- Santa Lucía
- Daule
- Nobol
- Guayaquil

=== Cities along the Babahoyo River ===
- Babahoyo
- Samborondón
- Durán

=== Cities along the Guayas River ===
- Guayaquil
- Durán

== See also ==
National symbols of Ecuador
