= Miss Earth Ecuador 2017 =

- Date: August 27, 2017
- Presenters: María Belén Cedeño
- Venue: The Point Building, Guayaquil, Guayas
- Broadcaster: RTS
- Entrants: 11
- Placements: 4
- Debuts: Azuay; El Oro; Esmeraldas; Guayas; Manabí; Santo Domingo
- Winner: Lessie Giler; Manabí

Miss Earth Ecuador 2017, was the 1st edition of Miss Earth Ecuador held on August 27, 2017. At the end of the night Lessie Giler from Manabí was crowned by Miss Earth 2016, Katherine Espín.

== Results ==
=== Placements ===
Placement	Contestant
Miss Earth Ecuador 2017	Manabí – Lessie Giler
Miss Air Ecuador 2017	Manabí – Daniela García
Miss Water Ecuador 2017	Azuay – Clara Álvarez
Miss Fire Ecuador 2017	Guayas – Sofía Freile

=== Special awards ===
Award	Contestant
Miss Photogenic	Manabí – Lessie Giler
Miss Popularity	Guayas – Gabriela Villón
Miss Environment	Guayas – Camila Cedeño
Best Face	Manabí – Lessie Giler
Best Body	Guayas – Sofía Freile
Best Hair	Manabí – Lessie Giler
Best Catwalk	Guayas – Karina Nazareno
Best Smile	Guayas – Sofía Freile
Best Ecologic Costume	Manabí – Lessie Giler

== Contestants ==
Eleven contestants competed for the title.

Province	Contestant	Age	Height	Hometown
Azuay	María Clara Álvarez León	22	1.72 m (5 ft 7 1/2 in)	Cuenca
El Oro	Marissa Gabriela Curipoma Valarezo	21	1.70 m (5 ft 7 in)	Atahualpa
Esmeraldas	Wendy Kathya Cotera Quintero	24	1.71 m (5 ft 7 1/2 in)	San Lorenzo
Guayas	Mazly Michelle Yuqui Silva	24	1.68 m (5 ft 6 in)	Bucay
Guayas	Camila Mishelle Cedeño Ortega	20	1.72 m (5 ft 7 1/2 in)	Guayaquil
Guayas	Sofía Jeanine Freile Cuadros	22	1.74 m (5 ft 8 1/2 in)	Guayaquil
Guayas	Karina Nazareno Preciado	24	1.71 m (5 ft 7 1/2 in)	Guayaquil
Guayas	Julia Gabriela Villón Aguilar	23	1.69 m (5 ft 6 1/2 in)	Guayaquil
Manabí	Daniela Paola García Salazar	23	1.72 m (5 ft 7 1/2 in)	Bahía
Manabí	Lessie Mishel Giler Sánchez	19	1.68 m (5 ft 6 in)	Portoviejo
Santo Domingo	Catherine Pilar Catota Gallo	26	1.70 m (5 ft 7 in)	Santo Domingo

== Debuts ==
- Azuay
- El Oro
- Esmeraldas
- Guayas
- Manabí
- Santo Domingo

== Crossovers ==
- Lessie Giler was crowned Miss Teen Ecuador Universo 2015.
- Marissa Curipoma won the title of Reina de Atahualpa 2014. She competed at Reina de El Oro 2015, but she was unplaced.
- Wendy Cotera competed in Reina de San Lorenzo 2015, but she was unplaced.
- Mazly Yuqui competed in Reina de Bucay 2013. Also, Reina de Guayas 2014, but she was unplaced.
- Karina Nazareno competed in Reina de Guayas 2012, but she was unplaced.
- Daniela Garía was Reina de Bahía 2015.
