= Alfredo Baquerizo Moreno (disambiguation) =

Alfredo Baquerizo Moreno may refer to:

- Alfredo Baquerizo Moreno (1859–1951), a former president of Ecuador
- Alfredo Baquerizo Moreno (canton), also known as Jujan, in the Guayas province of Ecuador
- Alfredo Baquerizo Moreno (town), also known as Jujan, in the Alfredo Baquerizo Moreno canton, Guayas province, Ecuador
