= Palestina Canton =

- Canton
- Flag

- Location of Guayas in Ecuador.

- Palestina Canton in Guayas Province
- Coordinates: 1.6263°S 79.9770°W
- Country: Ecuador
- Province: Guayas Province
- Capital: Palestina

Area
  - Total: 186.6 km^{2} (72.0 sq mi)

Population (2022 census)
  - Total: 18,019
  - Density: 96.56/km^{2} (250.1/sq mi)
- Time zone: UTC-5 (ECT)

Palestina Canton is a Canton located in northern Guayas, Ecuador, created in 1988. Palestina Canton has a population of 18,019, and its nearby cities are Santa Lucía, Daule, Colimes and Balzar. The town of Palestina is located 80 km north of Guayaquil, at the Northern Centre of the province. The canton occupies a territory of 186.6 km^{2}.

Its location and denomination come after the treasury history of “Palestina,” named after the journeys to Palestine made by the founder, Dr. Vicente Piedrahita. The aforementioned treasury has become the town's main source of development due to the agricultural activities carried out in this place. The overall development reached by the population made it possible for Palestina to be deemed a rural parish of Daule's Canton under decree No. 383, on June 16, 1956. Palestina, then, was part of Daule until February 3, 1987, when it became part of Santa Lucía Canton.

On July 5, 1988, Palestina was officially categorized as a canton according to the Official Register No. 985. By resolution of the canton committee, all festivities were held on day 20, since this day coincides with the festivities of Guayaquil.

As of the census of 2001, 14,067 people are residing within canton limits. The most important river is the Daule River, used for transportation. St. Bartholomew is the patron saint of Palestina.

== History ==
=== Creation ===
Several historians argue that in pre-Columbian times, the current territory of the canton was inhabited by the Chonanas tribe that had formalized peace agreements with the Huancavilcas. During the colonial period, the territory was known as "embarcadero". The name Palestina comes from a journey Dr. Vicente Piedrahíta Carbo (1834-1878) made to the Middle East, and upon his return, he named several properties after places he had visited, such as Palestine, Yumes, Tebas, Jordan, among others. The estate was named Palestina and became the property of several owners, becoming an increasingly populated area.

On March 23, 1957, the parochialization of Palestina was approved, and since then it would be a parish of Daule Canton. On February 3, 1987, Santa Lucía was cantonized, which resulted in Palestina becoming part of it.

=== Foundation ===
On June 3, 1986, Luis Eduardo Robles Plaza, Minister of Government, received the request for the cantonization of Palestina. Two years later, in 1988, Dr. Jorge Zavala Baquerizo would send the law of cantonization of Palestina to the president of that time, Mr. Leon Febres Cordero, who signed it on July 20, 1988. Even though the cantonization law was published in the Official Registry No. 100 on July 25, 1988, the community of Palestina celebrates its cantonization on July 20 of each year.

== Geography ==
Palestina is located in the north-central area of the province of Guayas in the Republic of Ecuador. Its cantonal capital is Palestina, situated 80 km from Guayaquil.

Palestina covers an area of 300 km^{2}. It is bordered to the north by the Colimes Canton; to the south by the canton of Santa Lucía; to the east by the province of Los Rios; and to the west by the Salitre Canton. Palestina is a coastal town, bordered by the Daule River.

The town of Palestina is located within the Ecuadorian mainland, which, in turn, is situated in the coastal region or Litoral and within the Planning and Land Management of Guayas in zone #1 along with Empalme, Balzar, Colimes.

=== Biodiversity ===
The flora of the canton is determined mainly by rice, and complementarity teak, less cocoa, mango, tobacco, among others typical of the agro-exporting Guayas. There can also be found other native species, such as guava, pachaco, higuerón, visuacho, niguito, laurel, cane guadua, river guava, river plants like water hyacinth and river lettuce, mango, bototillo, guarumo, among others.

The fauna is characterized by native species, in the faunal reserve of the area, which is made up of fish, such as boca chico, vieja, and dama. Reptiles and amphibians, such as the brown toad, geckos, lizards, and horse thrasher. Rodents such as raposa and field mice. In addition, birds such as crow duck, white heron, cattle egret, black heron, guaraguao hen, swallow, tile, patillo, sparrow hawk, tortolita, garrapatero, and other native species. Besides, even in the city, we find fighting cocks, and of self-consumption, of poultry.

=== Climate ===
The type of soil is prominently clayey, silt, and sand, typical of flood zones and conducive to the cultivation of rice, corn, cocoa, etc.

Palestina Canton has a tropical climate with an average annual temperature between 23 °C and 25 °C and average annual precipitation of 1,000 mm to 1,500 mm from December to May.

=== Demographics ===
According to the intercensal population information provided by INEC (A National Statistics and Census Institute), the last census of 2010 indicated that the total estimated population was 16,065. The population of Palestina Canton in 2001 was 47% urban and 53% rural. There is no notable difference between the male and female population, male (8,354) and female (7,711). The average age of the canton's total population is 28 years, 27 in rural areas, and 28 in urban areas, according to the last census of 2010.

==== Ethnic groups ====
- Montubio 57%
- Mestizo 33%
- Afro-Ecuadorian 4.55%tst
- White 3.73%
- Indigenous 0.12%
- Other 0.14%

== Economy ==
=== Statistics ===
According to the 2010 Economic Census carried out by the INEC, the official per capita income is US$996. The lowest per capita income belongs to Simón Bolívar Canton with an estimated amount of US$187 while the highest belongs to Guayaquil with US$16,660. The average per capita income of the province of Guayas is US$2,791. The official per capita income of Palestina is hardly 9% of Guayas income and 9.3% of the country's income.

=== Economic activities ===
The economic activities are based on 3 factors:

- Agroindustry (rice, mango, and cacao), Commerce and Supplies
- The poultry industry and livestock breeding of fish and cows
- Trade of agricultural machinery and equipment

Together with the province Los Ríos, the province of Guayas is mostly known for the exportation of products necessary for food security. Palestina Canton provides 2 to 3% of the whole production with a population of 1.3% of the whole population of Guayas. As a consequence, the population is highly productive.

Even though most of the production is in the countryside, the income comes mainly from commercial activities.

Regarding their legal nature, there is a gap in three aspects of Palestina's economy:

1. Production cooperatives
2. Productive Unions
3. International firms

The current cooperatives are associations that neither link productions nor lower costs in a charitable way within the cooperatives. The purpose is to be a node of information according to governmental requirements of credit. In other words, smallholders, drivers, and other businesspeople group only as a requirement but they do not make up a productive, charitable and social cooperative that would provide an increase in community wellness and reduction of costs. 57% of the current population is officially employed according to the PEA standard (economically active population).

In 2010, the PEA of Palestina was categorized in the following sectors:

1. Primary Sector: 2,609, of which 2,607 are devoted to agriculture and 2 to mining.
2. Secondary Sector: 385, of which 215 are devoted to industry.
3. Tertiary Sector: 1,723, of which 160 are devoted to building, 2 to supplies, 8 to waste management, 648 to commerce, 221 to transport, 107 to hotels and restaurants, 16 to information and communication, 4 to financial activities, 2 to real estate, 15 to scientific activities, 48 to support services, 113 to public administration, 160 to teaching, 35 to medicine, 6 to recreational activities, 284 to housekeeping.
4. Illegal Employment: 695
5. New Employees: 293
6. Participation in canton: 0,38%

As a result of the previous statistics, the population of the canton is mostly devoted to agriculture, commerce, and finally services.

Palestina lacks international trade; they only commercialize nationally. The only raw material that they export to the US and Europe is Mango, and their special species of Mango is called Edward.

=== SWOT analysis ===
- S (strength): Production of rice and trade of Mango.
- W (weakness): Unemployment, poverty, and low salary.
- O (opportunity): Cheap labor, precautions to flood, potential diversity in production that can generate new opportunities, and workforce demand.
- T (threat): Decline in foreign demand, inflation, plague, and migration of laborers.

=== Agricultural GDP ===
Rice production together with piling and mango and cacao exportation is the most important economic activity in the agricultural industry, with 55% of the total GDP.

== Social developments ==
Palestina Canton is located within the Rice Route, also described as the Montubia path. The Montubia culture is central to the canto due to the settlement of Montubios in the area. They are known for their music, dances, stories, clothing, and gastronomy. Besides, they are excellent horse riders, a unique identity of the citizens.

=== Culture and traditions ===
==== Montubio Rodeo ====
The Montubio Rodeo is one of the main attractions across the area. One of the key activities is the taming of horses.

In the festivity of “Columbus Day”, celebrated on October 12, each neighborhood competes in rodeos within their ranches and nominates their candidates for the queen. Later that day, of all the candidates chosen in each neighborhood, they finally choose the Queen of Queens and lead a parade in Vicente Piedrahita Street.

==== Cockfights ====
Cockfights take place in the cockpit located in Vicente Piedrahita and Amazonas streets. Neighbors gather as of 2 p.m. and make their bets. Fights are brief, they last less than a minute, and the faster cock wins. This activity takes place every Friday.

==== Cuisine ====
Palestina's varied cuisine is influenced by its fauna and flora as well as the cultural traditions of the ethnic groups. The most common type of food is Creole Food. Among the most representative appetizers and soups are fritada (pork sauté), seco de gallina (chicken stew), and arroz con menestra (rice soup).

==== Sports ====
Palestina Canton has a football stadium. There is a football school and competitions come about in summer. The stadium is exclusively used for football games; festivals or parties are not allowed there.

=== Tourism ===
Faith tourism is vital for Palestina Canton. The major tourist attractions are San Bartolomé Church and the Crucified Christ. Even though the church burned down more than ten years ago, the image of the Crucified Christ remained intact. Therefore, inhabitants have worshiped it since then. Among the scheduled activities, the Patron Saint Festivity (Saint Bartholomew Festivity) stands out. The novena starts on August 15, dividing the canton into nine sectors. On August 24, the procession of the Saint is performed, followed by a mass at 7 p.m. After the Mass is said, the parades begin.

== Education ==
Palestinian general coverage of education is inefficient. It is focused on the “basic levels of education” and primary school. Adolescents and adults are more likely to drop out of school. Among its positive aspects, state intervention offers students free texts and uniforms as well as the modification of infrastructure by adding new technologies.

=== Primary and secondary education ===
Following state policies, the educational institutions that do not guarantee the optimal conditions for education are to be reduced. The schools located in Palestina Canton are the following:

- Colegio Fiscal Palestina. This institution was declared “A” category school and achieved the 27th position at the national level in 2010, after long efforts and dedication to better education.
- Escuela Fiscal Mixta Luis Alberto Suastegui
- Escuela Fiscal Mixta N - 1 Rosa Borja de Icaza
- Escuela Fiscal Mixta Nueva Palestina
- Escuela Partícula Mixta Clara Prado Olvera
- Unidad Educativa San Bartolomé

=== Higher education ===
Universidad Agraria del Ecuador (Extension). Universidad Agraria del Ecuador (Agricultural University of Ecuador) is a non-profit public higher education institution located in the metropolis of Guayaquil, Guayas. This institution also has a branch campus in Milagro. Besides, it also has academic activities distributed in other areas, Palestina being one of them. Officially recognized by the Consejo de Aseguramiento de la Calidad de la Educación Superior del Ecuador (Council for Quality Assurance of Higher Education of Ecuador), Agricultural University of Ecuador (AUE) is a small coeducational Ecuadorian higher education institution. The AUE offers courses and programs leading to officially recognized higher education degrees such as bachelor's degrees in several areas of study.

=== Illiteracy ===
Even though education has been intensified, the problem of illiteracy persists in Palestina Canton. There is an illiteracy rate of 15- year-old people onwards. This is an alarming situation due to the fact that a high proportion of students is not likely to finish primary or secondary school; thus, they would never be able to reach higher education.
