= Baquerizo =

Baquerizo may refer to:

== Families ==
People

- Alfredo Baquerizo (1859–1951), Ecuadorian politician
- Elsa Baquerizo (born 1987), Spanish beach volleyball player

Places

- Alfredo Baquerizo Moreno Canton, a canton in Guayas province in Ecuador
- Alfredo Baquerizo Moreno (town), a town in Guayas province in Ecuador
- Puerto Baquerizo Moreno, capital of Galápagos Province, Ecuador
