= Naranjal =

Naranjal (Spanish for orange grove) may refer to:

- Naranjal (canton), Ecuador
- Naranjal, Ecuador
- Naranjal District, Paraguay
- Naranjal, Veracruz, Mexico
- Naranjal mine, a legendary lost gold mine in the Sierra Mountains of Mexico
- Naranjal, hacienda in San Martín de Porres District, Peru
- Naranjal (Colombia)
