= El Empalme =

El Empalme may refer to:

- El Empalme Canton, a canton of Ecuador
  - El Empalme, Ecuador, capital city of the El Empalme Canton
- El Empalme, Bocas del Toro, Panama
