= Velasco Ibarra =

Velasco Ibarra may refer to:

- José María Velasco Ibarra (1893–1979), Ecuadorian president
- El Empalme, Ecuador, known officially as Velasco Ibarra, a city in Guayas, Ecuador
