= Durán, Ecuador =

Durán Eloy Alfaro
- City
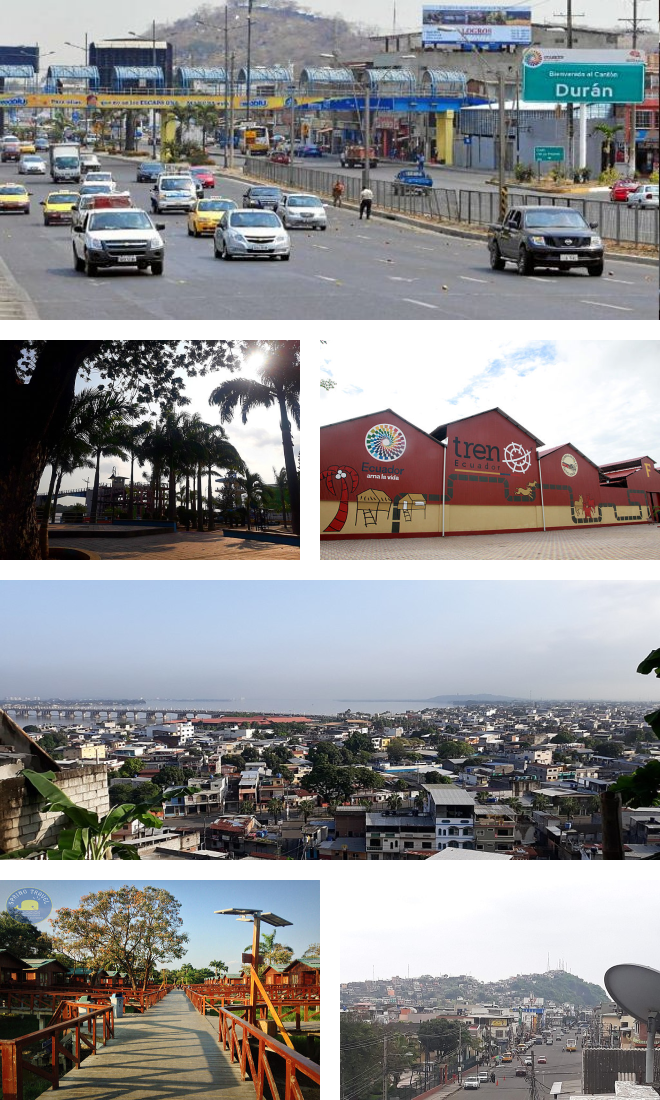
- From top, left to right: Nicolas Lapentti Avenue, Abel Gilbert Boardwalk, Duran railway station, panoramic view of Duran, Santay Island and Samuel Cisneros Avenue.

- Flag

- Location within Ecuador
- Coordinates: 2°10′24″S 79°49′52″W
- Country: Ecuador
- Province: Guayas
- Canton: Durán
- Founded: October 16, 1924

Government
  - Mayor: Luis Chonillo

Area
  - City: 53.45 km^{2} (20.64 sq mi)
- Elevation: 4 m (13 ft)

Population (2022 census)
  - City: 295,211
  - Density: 5,523/km^{2} (14,300/sq mi)
- Time zone: UTC-5 (ECT)
- Area code: (+593) 04
- Climate: Aw
- Demonym: duraneño, -a
- Website: www.duran.gob.ec (in Spanish)

Durán, also known as Eloy Alfaro, is the second largest city in the province of Guayas, Ecuador and the seat of Durán Canton. It is located near the confluence of the Daule & Babahoyo rivers, where the Guayas River enters the ocean, across the Guayas River from Guayaquil. The name "Eloy Alfaro" was chosen because of the Ecuadorian ex-president Eloy Alfaro Delgado. According to the National census in 2022, the city had a population of 295,211. Many of its inhabitants commute to other places for work, so it can be considered a commuter town. However, many people who live in Durán find work within the canton by opening "comedores" or small restaurants, selling produce at the market, or even opening little stores with basic produce and house necessities. The towns Durán, Samborondón, and Guayaquil are connected by the bridge Rafael Mendoza Avilés.

Durán is also well known for being the first railroad hub in Ecuador. It is the coastal railhead for the Ecuadorean rail network, and the closest point to Guayaquil because the railroad does not bridge the Guayas River. Since July 2007, a government program for the railroad reactivation began as well as the railroad connecting Duran with other cities located in the highlands of Ecuador. The Empresa de Ferrocarriles Ecuatorianos offers rail service aimed at tourists to Quito.

According to the Economist, Duran had the highest murder rate in the world in 2023, with 148 homicides per 100,000 residents. The newspaper has labelled it "the most dangerous city in the world".
