= Babahoyo =

- City
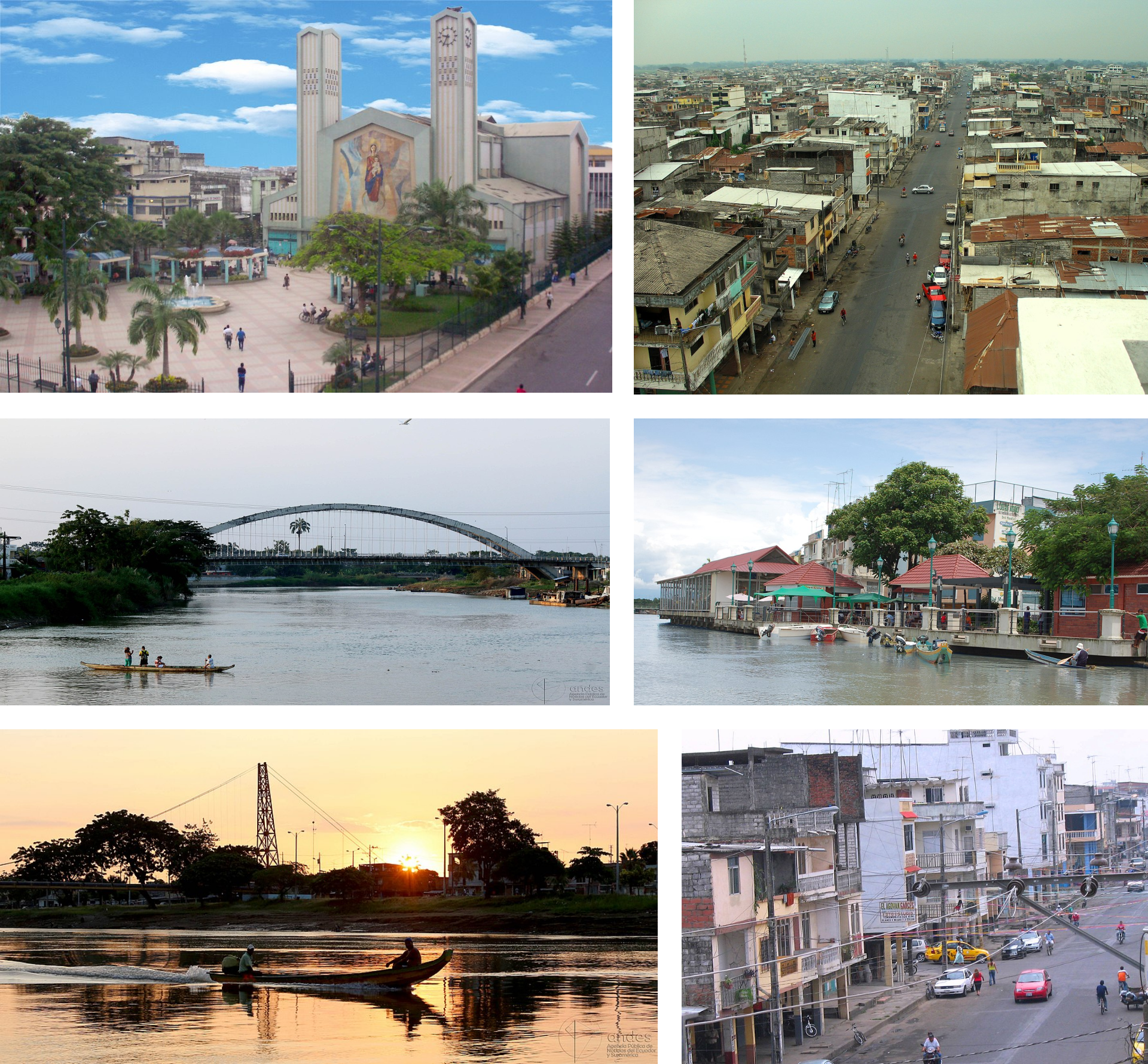
- From top, left to right: Our Lady of Mercy Cathedral next to the Central Park 24 May, view of the southwest of the city, Catarama River Bridge, 9 October Boardwalk, Babahoyo River and García Moreno Street.

- Location within Ecuador
- Coordinates: 1°48′0″S 79°32′24″W
- Country: Ecuador
- Province: Los Ríos
- Canton: Babahoyo
- Founded: 1796

Government
  - Mayor: Gustavo Barquet

Area
  - City: 13.66 km^{2} (5.27 sq mi)
- Elevation: 8 m (26 ft)

Population (2022 census)
  - City: 98,251
  - Density: 7,193/km^{2} (18,630/sq mi)
  - Demonym: Babahoyense
- Time zone: UTC-5 hours
- Area code: (+593) 5
- Climate: Aw
- Website: www.babahoyo.gob.ec (in Spanish)

Babahoyo (Spanish pronunciation: [baβaˈoʝo]), founded 27 May 1948, by legislative decree, is the capital of the Los Ríos province of Ecuador. Its population is cited around 98,000. It is bordered by two rivers, the San Pablo and the Caracol, which join to form the Babahoyo River. This meets the Daule River to form the Guayas River, which runs to the Pacific Ocean at the Gulf of Guayaquil.

A processing and trade center for the surrounding agricultural region, the city handles rice, sugarcane, fruits, balsa wood, and tagua nuts (vegetable ivory). Rice and sugar are also milled here.

== Geography ==
The city is located in on the left bank of the San Pablo River, which unites in its estuary with the Catarama River to form the Babahoyo River. One of the most interesting excursions one can take in the area is a boat trip on the Babahoyo River. Babahoyo is located in the Littoral Region of Ecuador. It is an obligatory stop when going to the mountains through the highways of Babahoyo – Quito (via Panamericana), Babahoyo – Ambato (via Flores) and also through Babahoyo – Riobamba.

Babahoyo is located in the south of the province of Los Ríos. The roads that unite it with other cities and towns in the coast are Babahoyo – Baba, Babahoyo – Guayaquil and Babahoyo – Milagro. More than 25,000 cars, buses, trailers and trucks pass through Babahoyo every day. Babahoyo is a commercial center between the coast and the mountains. Through the urban road network, the city counts on two pedestrian bridges that permit communication between Barreiro and El Salto. There are four bridges for vehicles: the first two cross the Catarama River and the San Pablo river in the north of the city (Babahoyo – Quito highway), the third crosses the Lagarto marsh in the south of the city (Babahoyo – Guayaquil highway), and the fourth is located in the sector of La Ventura (Babahoyo – Ambato highway).

=== Climate ===
The city has a hot and humid climate. Babahoyo floods frequently during the winter months. (Note:Babahoyo flooded during January–June 2008 in which the entire city flooded)

Climate data for Babahoyo (Isabel-Maria), elevation 7 m (23 ft), (1971–2000)
Month	Jan	Feb	Mar	Apr	May	Jun	Jul	Aug	Sep	Oct	Nov	Dec	Year
Mean daily maximum °C (°F)	30.4 (86.7)	30.6 (87.1)	31.2 (88.2)	31.2 (88.2)	30.3 (86.5)	28.7 (83.7)	27.8 (82.0)	28.4 (83.1)	29.1 (84.4)	29.2 (84.6)	29.4 (84.9)	30.4 (86.7)	29.7 (85.5)
Mean daily minimum °C (°F)	21.7 (71.1)	22.3 (72.1)	22.7 (72.9)	22.8 (73.0)	21.9 (71.4)	20.8 (69.4)	19.7 (67.5)	19.5 (67.1)	19.8 (67.6)	20.1 (68.2)	20.5 (68.9)	21.3 (70.3)	21.1 (70.0)
Average precipitation mm (inches)	385.0 (15.16)	435.0 (17.13)	428.0 (16.85)	341.0 (13.43)	101.0 (3.98)	35.0 (1.38)	15.0 (0.59)	2.0 (0.08)	6.0 (0.24)	8.0 (0.31)	11.0 (0.43)	74.0 (2.91)	1,841 (72.49)
Average relative humidity (%)	81	86	83	83	83	85	85	83	81	81	78	77	82
Source: FAO

== History ==
The city of Babahoyo was founded on 27 May 1869 in the lands ceded by the Flores family. Facing the confluence of the Babahoyo River and Caracol River, the city was established on the right bank of the San Pablo River. For a long time it was called Bodegas (warehouses) because the customs and royal stores were located in the city, to control the commerce between Guayaquil and the cities of the Ecuadorian mountains.

Babahoyo suffered from many fires, the worst one occurring on 30 March 1867, which demolished all of the goods of the population, creating a sufficient motive for the government of Dr. Gabriel García Moreno to move the city to its current location. The capital was moved to the other side of the San Pablo River, where the urban district of Barreiro is now located.

The area serves as an economic and geographic link between the costal and mountainous regions, using its local resources to connect surrounding villages through shared agricultural and commercial activities.

In June 2023 Bella Montoya, 76, who had been presumed dead, awoke in a coffin after a five-hour wake and banged on the coffin lid to be let out. Ecuador's Health Ministry said in a statement on 11 June, that the woman had been admitted to hospital with a suspected stroke "and went into cardiorespiratory arrest without responding to resuscitation maneuvers, so the doctor on duty confirmed her death." The Martín Icaza government hospital had declared her dead on Friday. A video posted on Twitter, showing her in her open coffin, breathing heavily, while two men assisted her, went viral on social media.

== Demographics ==
Babahoyo has a population of 98,251 in the city center, which is one of the largest of the region. It is one of the 20 biggest cities of the country. A large part of its population is in the urban area and in the outskirts of the city which are near the Bypass (Via E25, highway Babahoyo – Quito) that passes through all of the city from the south to the northeast. The center of the city begins at Malecón 9 de octubre, and includes the roads Juan x Marcos Isaías Chopitea and ends at Primero de Mayo. This is the center for commerce and public administration. The center has all infrastructure services and a large part of the community centers of the city; the buildings of this sector are built with strong, modern materials. The roads are in good repair, all with strong paving and some paved with flexible asphalt.

== Economy ==
The population is mainly dedicated to farming and common crops from the region are rice, bananas, sugarcane, balsa wood, and tagua nuts. There is also a state-owned distillery, which produces alcohol, perfume, and ether. Different industries have taken root in this city such as Industrias Facundo located in the periphery of the city, and also the Ingenio Isabel Maria, the fourth largest refinery in the country, and different (piladoras); a large part of the city is upwardly mobile above all in the city center which is the largest economic center in the province. There are also a few different banking entities.

== Culture ==
The patron saint’s day is 24 September. Each year Babahoya gives just homage to the Virgin of Merced in the following manner: from the 15th until 23 September, different groups carry the Virgin through the streets of the city. On the 24th the day of September Merced is celebrated. Artisans of the mountain and coastal regions of Ecuador show and sell their wares, and there is always a large fair of children's toys. Folkloric groups and national and sometimes international singers come to give homage to the Virgin.

== Attractions ==
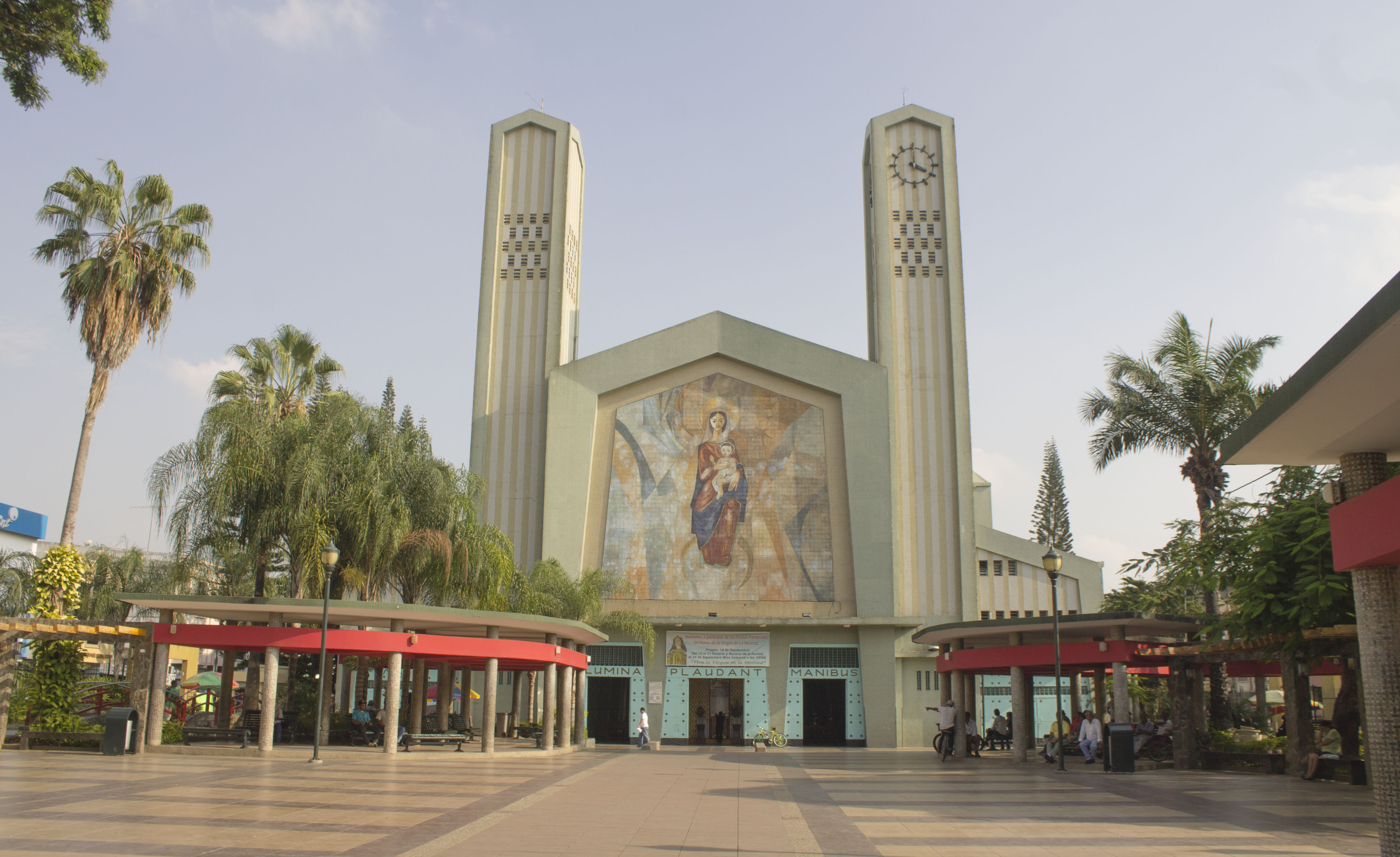
Cathedral of Nuestra Señora de la Merced (Our Lady of Mercy)

Noteworthy attractions of the capital include the verdant gardens of Parque 24 de Mayo and the city's main cathedral, which is decorated with an enormous mosaic mural depicting the Virgin Mary (see image).

One of the excursions that the area offers involves sailing down the Rio Babahoyo, taking in the countryside and the traditional lifestyle of the area's campesinos who live off the land, cultivating crops and raising cattle. One feature of this journey that stands out is seeing the floating houses unique to the area.

=== Local Festivals ===
Within the local festivals and holidays that Babahoyans celebrate are the following:

Festividades locales
Date	Celebration
1 January	New Year's Day
February or March	Carnival
March or April	Holy Week
1 May	Labor Day
27 May	Founding of Babahoyo
24 May	Battle of Pichincha
10 August	First Shout of Independence
24 September	Festival of the Patron Saint of the city
6 October	Creation of the Los Ríos Province
11 October	Independence of Babahoyo
12 October	Race Day
2 November	Day of the Dead
25 December	Christmas
31 December	New Year's Eve

== Food ==
In Babahoyo the main dish is the ceviche of shrimp, fish and conch. Another characteristic dish famous in Babahoyo is the caldo de manguera (sausage soup).

== Transportation ==
Most bus companies running between Quito and Guayaquil stop or pass through Babahoyo. Quevedo connects with Guayaquil by two highways, a less popular one through Balzar and Daule, and one that passes through Babahoyo.

Babahoyo has two Transportation Agencies: Fluminense and The Santa Ana Cooperative. There are 5 bus routes and each of these go from the northeast to the south passing through the city center. There is also transportation by boat which joins the urban parishes of Barreiro and El Salto and the rural parishes of Pimocha and Caracol.

== Rural Districts ==
=== La Unión ===
Located in the northwest of Babahoyo, close to the mountains, is an agricultural district which is dedicated to fishing and rice, soy and banana cultivation.

=== Pimocha ===
It is a very large district in regards to area. It borders Puebloviejo county in the north, the Babahoyo River in the south, the Caracol River in the east, and the Garrapata River in the west. Its precincts are Cauge, Guarumo, Chapulo, Convento, Mapan, Sauce, Gallinazo, Papayal, Compañía, Pechiche Dulce, Santa Rita, Las tres bocas, Calabria, Cubon de Caimito, Parindero, Río Grande, Tejar, Providencia, etc. It is certain that it was home to many tribes that formed the Huancavilca villages.

The main source of work and wealth is agriculture although some other industries exist. The ground produces cocoa, rice, sugar cane, coffee, rubber, fine wood, especially oak, cedar and balsa wood. Bananas are exported in large quantities. Also pineapple, sapote, and many wild fruits grow here. Extensive industries other than livestock and fishery are sugar factories and liquor production and rice and coffee farming.

=== Caracol ===
It is one of the oldest populations. Perhaps like Ojivarm it was the location of an indigenous tribe that the Spanish encountered during their expedition in these lands. In 1838 the population was raised to a category of an ecclesiastical parish, making it independent of the curate of Babahoyo. It borders Catarma in the north, Barriero in the south, Montalvo in the east and is separated from Pimocha in the west by the Caracol River.

=== Febres Cordero ===
Created in Recinto de Las Juntas on 14 May 1936, its inhabitants are farmers and ranchers. Febres Cordero is one of the most important agricultural centres of the city.
