= El Empalme, Ecuador =

El Empalme
- Town
- Flag

- Location within Ecuador
- Coordinates: 1°02′38″S 79°38′18″W
- Country: Ecuador
- Province: Guayas
- Canton: El Empalme Canton

Area
  - Town: 11.06 km^{2} (4.27 sq mi)

Population (2022 census)
  - Town: 41,778
  - Density: 3,777/km^{2} (9,783/sq mi)
- Website: http://www.municipioelempalme.gob.ec/

El Empalme is a town in Guayas, Ecuador, near Los Ríos and Manabí provinces. It is the seat of El Empalme Canton, the northernmost canton in Guayas, created in 1971.

As of the census of 2001, there were 64,789 people residing within canton limits. The city takes its official name from the Ecuadorian ex-president José María Velasco Ibarra. It has good road connection with Balzar.

Rice, platano, cacao, and coffee are the main products. The most important river is the Daule River, which forms the boundary with Manabí.
