= Naranjito, Ecuador =

City in Guayas Province, Ecuador

Naranjito
- City
- Location within Ecuador
- Coordinates: 2°10′00″S 79°27′55″W
- Country: Ecuador
- Province: Guayas
- Canton: Naranjito
- Elevation: 28 m (92 ft)

Population (2010)
  - Total: 34,664
- Time zone: UTC−3 (ART)

Naranjito is a city located in the Guayas Province of Ecuador. It is the seat of Naranjito Canton. It is located in the south-central part of the coastal region of Ecuador, located on an extensive plain, crossed by the El Chorrón estuary, at an altitude of 30 m above sea level and with a tropical savannah climate of 25.5 °C on average.

== Geography ==
The terrain around Naranjito is very flat. The highest point nearby is 38 meters above sea level, 1.6 km (0.99 mi) southeast of Naranjito. Around Naranjito, it is quite densely populated, with 52 inhabitants per square kilometer. The nearest larger community is Milagro, 14.7 km (9.1 mi) west of Naranjito. The area around Naranjito consists mostly of agricultural land.

=== Climate ===
A savannah climate prevails in the area. The average annual temperature in the area is 22 °C. The warmest month is December, when the average temperature is 24 °C, and the coldest is February, with 20 °C. Average annual rainfall is 1,360 millimeters. The wettest month is February, with an average of 310 mm of precipitation, and the driest is July, with 26 mm of precipitation.

Climate data for Naranjito (San Carlos Ingenio), elevation 35 m (115 ft), (1970–2000)
Month	Jan	Feb	Mar	Apr	May	Jun	Jul	Aug	Sep	Oct	Nov	Dec	Year
Mean daily maximum °C (°F)	30.0 (86.0)	30.2 (86.4)	30.7 (87.3)	31.1 (88.0)	29.6 (85.3)	28.2 (82.8)	27.2 (81.0)	27.7 (81.9)	28.9 (84.0)	28.2 (82.8)	28.6 (83.5)	30.0 (86.0)	29.2 (84.6)
Mean daily minimum °C (°F)	21.4 (70.5)	21.7 (71.1)	22.2 (72.0)	22.2 (72.0)	21.6 (70.9)	20.8 (69.4)	19.8 (67.6)	19.6 (67.3)	19.8 (67.6)	20.0 (68.0)	20.3 (68.5)	21.1 (70.0)	20.9 (69.6)
Average precipitation mm (inches)	303.0 (11.93)	338.0 (13.31)	348.0 (13.70)	238.0 (9.37)	85.0 (3.35)	59.0 (2.32)	22.0 (0.87)	4.0 (0.16)	10.0 (0.39)	8.0 (0.31)	27.0 (1.06)	56.0 (2.20)	1,498 (58.97)
Average relative humidity (%)	82	85	83	82	82	84	84	82	80	80	79	78	82
Source: FAO
