= Coronel Marcelino Maridueña Canton =

- Canton
- Location of the Coronel Marcelino Maridueña Canton.
- Coordinates: 2°12′0″S 79°25′12″W
- Country: Ecuador
- Province: Guayas Province
- Capital: Coronel Marcelino Maridueña

Area
  - Total: 253.4 km^{2} (97.8 sq mi)

Population (2022 census)
  - Total: 13,182
  - Density: 52.02/km^{2} (134.7/sq mi)
- Time zone: UTC-5 (ECT)

Coronel Marcelino Maridueña Canton is a canton of Ecuador, located in the Guayas Province. Its capital is the town of Coronel Marcelino Maridueña. Its population at the 2001 census was 11,054.

== Transport and Access ==
The canton’s access roads are paved. Bus cooperatives serving this canton include:

- Cooperativa Marcelino Maridueña
- CITIM (no longer in service)

== Production ==
The canton boasts extensive pastures and is notable for its highly mechanized sugarcane cultivation. It also features banana plantations and other tropical fruit crops. Cattle, select horse breeds, and poultry are raised across its vast areas. The primary economic activity revolves around the sugar industry, which supplies the national market and provides employment for thousands of workers and technicians from across the country. The terrain is generally flat, with gentle undulations shaping the landscape.

== Gastronomy ==
A standout traditional dish is arroz con menestra y carne asada (rice with stewed beans and grilled meat), a local favorite. Another highlight is Ron Sideral, a distilled sugarcane liquor produced from the milling of sugarcane.

== Tourism ==
Tourists usually visit local factories' modern facilities to observe the sugar and paper production processes and enjoy the scenic natural landscapes.

The Local Decentralized Autonomous Government (GAD) has recently promoted tourism by developing a family-friendly recreational area along the Chimbo River, named "La playita de Acapulco." In addition to swimming, the site hosts cultural performances and features local food stalls.

== Festivals ==
Key celebrations include:

- October 24: Commemorates the canton’s founding anniversary.
- November 4: Honors San Carlos Borromeo, the canton’s patron saint.
- October 12: Día de la Raza (Day of the Race/Columbus Day), marked by events celebrating Montubio heritage.

Marcelino Maridueña, formerly a parish of Yaguachi Canton, was established as an independent canton on January 7, 1992. Its capital is the city of Marcelino Maridueña (San Carlos), which shares its name with the sole parish.

== Coat of Arms ==
The coat of arms is circular, dominated by a large cogwheel symbolizing the canton’s industrial significance, represented by the San Carlos Sugar Mill. Inside the wheel, the canton’s name is displayed, flanked by crossed sugarcane stalks. The design is encircled by two flags joined at the base, with a floating ribbon at the top bearing the motto "UNIDAD TRABAJO Y PROGRESO" (Unity, Work, and Progress). Additional symbols—a cultivated field, rising sun, and open book—reflect themes of progress and enlightenment.

== Flag ==
The flag consists of five horizontal stripes alternating between green and white, echoing the flag of Guayas Province. Green dominates, symbolizing fertile land and agriculture. A yellow triangle on the left represents wealth generated by local labor. Its unconventional placement makes it visually striking. Approved on August 10, 1996, the flag, coat of arms, and anthem hold deep symbolic pride for Marcelino Maridueña’s residents.

== Demographics ==
Ethnic groups as of the Ecuadorian census of 2010:

- Mestizo 82.0%
- Montubio 6.8%
- White 5.5%
- Afro-Ecuadorian 4.3%
- Indigenous 1.3%
- Other 0.1%
