= Balzar Canton =

- Canton
- Motto: capital maicera del Ecuador
- Location of Balzar Canton.
- Coordinates: 1.36°S 79.90°W
- Country: Ecuador
- Province: Guayas Province

Government
  - Type: concejo cantonal

Area
  - Total: 1,177 km^{2} (454 sq mi)

Population (2022 census)
  - Total: 57,829
  - Density: 49.13/km^{2} (127.3/sq mi)
- Time zone: UTC-5 (ECT)

Balzar Canton is a canton of Ecuador, located in the Guayas Province. Its capital is the town of Balzar. Its population at the 2001 census was 48,470.

== Demographics ==
Ethnic groups as of the Ecuadorian census of 2010:

- Mestizo 55.8%
- Montubio 30.6%
- Afro-Ecuadorian 7.8%
- White 5.5%
- Indigenous 0.2%
- Other 0.2%
