= National symbols of Ecuador =

National symbols of Ecuador are the representative symbols that are used by Ecuador to represent the nation, reflecting different aspects of the cultural life and history. The official symbols or emblems of Ecuador are established by law in the Political Constitution of Ecuador.

== Official symbols ==
The official symbols of Ecuador are established by law.

	Symbol	Image	Adopted
Flag	Flag of Ecuador	National flag	September 26, 1860
National anthem	Salve, Oh Patria	Salve, Oh Patria Ecuador National Anthem	September 29, 1948
Coat of arms	Coat of arms of Ecuador	Coat of arms of Ecuador	1845 (altered 1900)

== Unofficial symbols ==
	Symbol	Image	Remarks
National flower	Chuquiraga "Chuquirahua"		Unofficial national flower emblems
National tree	Cinchona pubescens "Quina"		Exemplary view in Podocarpus National Park
National animals	Andean condor		1958
II	Galapagos tortoise		Equally recognizable as the symbol of the Galapagos Islands
III	Yasuni National Park		Recognized for its extreme biodiversity, where frog species are the most numerous
National colours	Yellow, blue and red	Yellow Blue Red	Yellow for the sun and gold, blue for the sky and liberty, red for blood and freedom
National Mountains	Chimborazo		National symbol: see coat of arms
National river	Guayas		National symbol: see coat of arms
National symbol	Steam boat on the Guayas River with the Chimborazo in the background	need picture here	Intended to depict the equal beauty and wealth of the Sierra and Costa regions.
National instrument	Rondador		Under the Panflute, lineage

== See also ==
- List of national animals
- List of national anthems
- List of national birds
- List of national flowers
- National colours
