= Coronel Marcelino Maridueña =

Coronel Maridueña
- Town
- Location within Ecuador
- Coordinates: 2°12′0″S 79°25′12″W
- Country: Ecuador
- Province: Guayas

Area
  - Town: 2.39 km^{2} (0.92 sq mi)

Population (2022 census)
  - Town: 7,796
  - Density: 3,260/km^{2} (8,450/sq mi)
- Climate: Aw

Coronel Marcelino Maridueña is a town located in eastern Guayas, Ecuador. It is the seat of Coronel Marcelino Maridueña Canton.

At the 2022 census Coronel Marcelino Maridueña Canton had a population of 13,183.

The most important crop is sugar cane, but bananas and tropical fruits are also grown. The main rivers are the Chimbo River, the Chanchán River, and the Barranco Alto River.

Saint Charles Borromeo is the patron saint of Coronel Marcelino Maridueña.
