= Simón Bolívar, Ecuador =

Simón Bolívar
- Town
- Location within Ecuador
- Coordinates: 2.00199°S 79.48402°W
- Country: Ecuador
- Province: Guayas Province
- Canton: Simón Bolívar Canton

Area
  - Town: 2.58 km^{2} (1.00 sq mi)

Population (2022 census)
  - Town: 8,696
  - Density: 3,370/km^{2} (8,730/sq mi)
- Time zone: UTC-5 (ECT)

Simón Bolívar is a town in Ecuador, located in the Guayas Province. It is the capital of Simón Bolívar Canton.
