= Samborondón =

- Parish and town
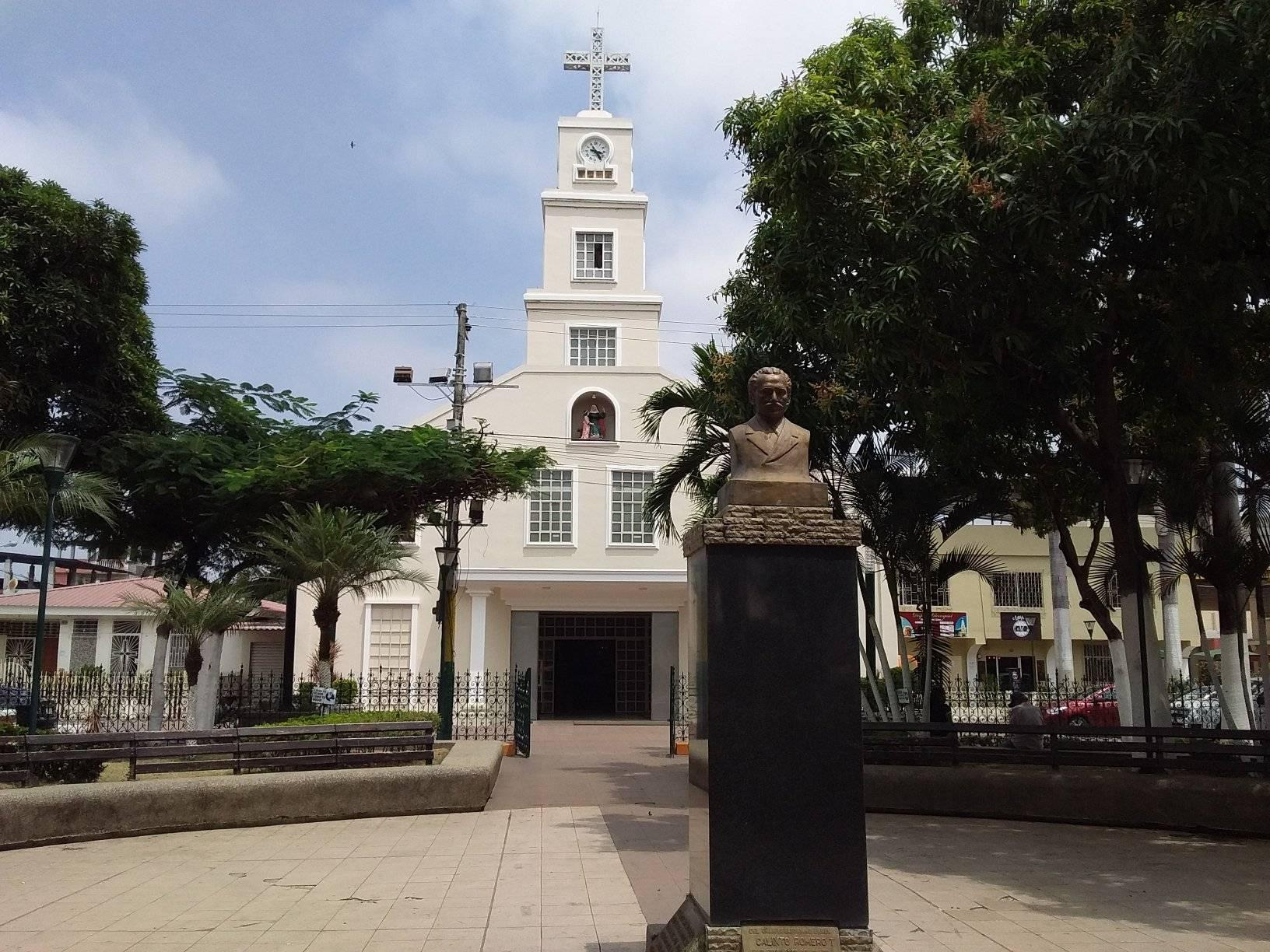

- Flag

- Location within Ecuador
- Coordinates: 2°11′S 79°53′W
- Country: Ecuador
- Province: Guayas
- Canton: Samborondón Canton

Government
  - Mayor: Juan José Yúnez

Area
  - Parish and town: 250.8 km^{2} (96.8 sq mi)
  - town: 45.48 km^{2} (17.56 sq mi)

Population (2022 census)
  - Parish and town: 81,854
  - Density: 326.4/km^{2} (845.3/sq mi)
  - town: 72,425
  - town density: 1,592/km^{2} (4,124/sq mi)
- Time zone: UTC-5 (ECT)
- Climate: Aw
- Website: www.samborondon.gob.ec

Samborondón is a parish and town in Ecuador’s Guayas province. It is the seat of Samborondón Canton, which consist of 105 localities and two urban parishes (La Puntilla) and Samborondón Town (Cabecera cantonal) and one rural parish (Tarifa). La Puntilla's parish is one of the most exclusive residential and entertainment districts in Ecuador. It has many Gated Communities (urbanizaciones cerradas), and several retail developments are located in the suburb. Its close proximity to the country's largest city, Guayaquil (merely crossing a bridge), allows many of its residents to work there. Most of the upper-class families in Guayaquil live at La Puntilla's Parish in Samborondón.

== History ==
Samborondón was founded on May 24, 1776 and achieved its independence on October 10, 1822. Since October 31, 1955 the suburb has been a canton.

The name Samborondón comes from Saint Brendan, in Spanish "San Borondón". The name of the Saint was commonly used in Spain and subsequently in Latin America for towns and villages. The name "Samborondón", in general usage, often refers to the rich downtown area of the canton called La Puntilla. In fact, Samborondón consists of a much larger area than just La Puntilla, which is a peninsula between the rivers Babahoyo and Daule (where the River Guayas is formed).

== Health care ==
A new branch of the Kennedy Hospital, a private hospital chain, was finished in 2007 and is now in use. There are also a few building complexes specially built for medical practices.

== Retail and entertainment ==
The local shopping center, Riocentro Entrerios has many retail stores, a hypermarket, a food court, and a cinema. The Village Plaza was inaugurated in August 2010. A hypermarket from the Supermaxi chain and other 90 stores have been announced. Bocca, La Piazza, La Torre, Las Terrazas, Plaza Lagos, Alhambra, Piazza, and Plaza Navona are smaller shopping centers, mainly around exclusive restaurants, gyms, nightclubs and stores.

The theater Teatro Sánchez Aguilar is also in this area.

== Tourism ==
The Parque Histórico, a botanical garden and zoo of the local fauna and flora with reconstructions of historical buildings, is one of the main tourist attractions of Guayaquil.

== Education ==
Due to the increasing growth of the area, many schools have relocated or established branch campuses from Guayaquil and Quito to Samborondón. Most of them are exclusive private schools, among them Colegio Menor, Abdon Calderon, Torremar and Delta (belonging to Opus Dei), Nuevo Mundo, Liceo Panamericano, Moderna Sergio Pérez Valdez, Centro Educativo Naciones Unidas, La Moderna, CREAR and Monte Tabor. The German School Guayaquil inaugurated a second kindergarten in Samborondón on April 13, 2009. There are 23 public elementary schools in the Canton.

The first university located in the suburb was the Universidad de Especialidades Espíritu Santo, which opened its doors on 1994. Another university, Ecotec has relocated to the suburb. Since 2000 the ESPOL (Technical University of the littoral) has an annex called PROTCOM in Samborondón, though it only offers 2 courses, leading to a technical associate degree.

== Climate ==
Samborondón has a tropical savanna climate (Köppen: Aw).

Climate data for Samborondón
Month	Jan	Feb	Mar	Apr	May	Jun	Jul	Aug	Sep	Oct	Nov	Dec	Year
Mean daily maximum °C (°F)	28.9 (84.0)	29.0 (84.2)	29.4 (84.9)	29.6 (85.3)	28.8 (83.8)	27.6 (81.7)	27.1 (80.8)	27.2 (81.0)	27.4 (81.3)	27.7 (81.9)	28.2 (82.8)	28.9 (84.0)	28.3 (83.0)
Daily mean °C (°F)	25.7 (78.3)	25.9 (78.6)	26.2 (79.2)	26.2 (79.2)	25.5 (77.9)	24.3 (75.7)	23.7 (74.7)	23.4 (74.1)	23.5 (74.3)	23.7 (74.7)	24.1 (75.4)	25.2 (77.4)	24.8 (76.6)
Mean daily minimum °C (°F)	23.4 (74.1)	23.7 (74.7)	23.8 (74.8)	23.7 (74.7)	23.0 (73.4)	22.0 (71.6)	21.3 (70.3)	20.9 (69.6)	20.9 (69.6)	21.1 (70.0)	21.5 (70.7)	22.6 (72.7)	22.3 (72.2)
Average precipitation mm (inches)	157.0 (6.18)	241.2 (9.50)	266.8 (10.50)	148.5 (5.85)	130.4 (5.13)	96.5 (3.80)	77.6 (3.06)	59.8 (2.35)	72.3 (2.85)	57.2 (2.25)	41.5 (1.63)	70.2 (2.76)	1,419 (55.86)
Source: Weather.Directory

== Gallery ==
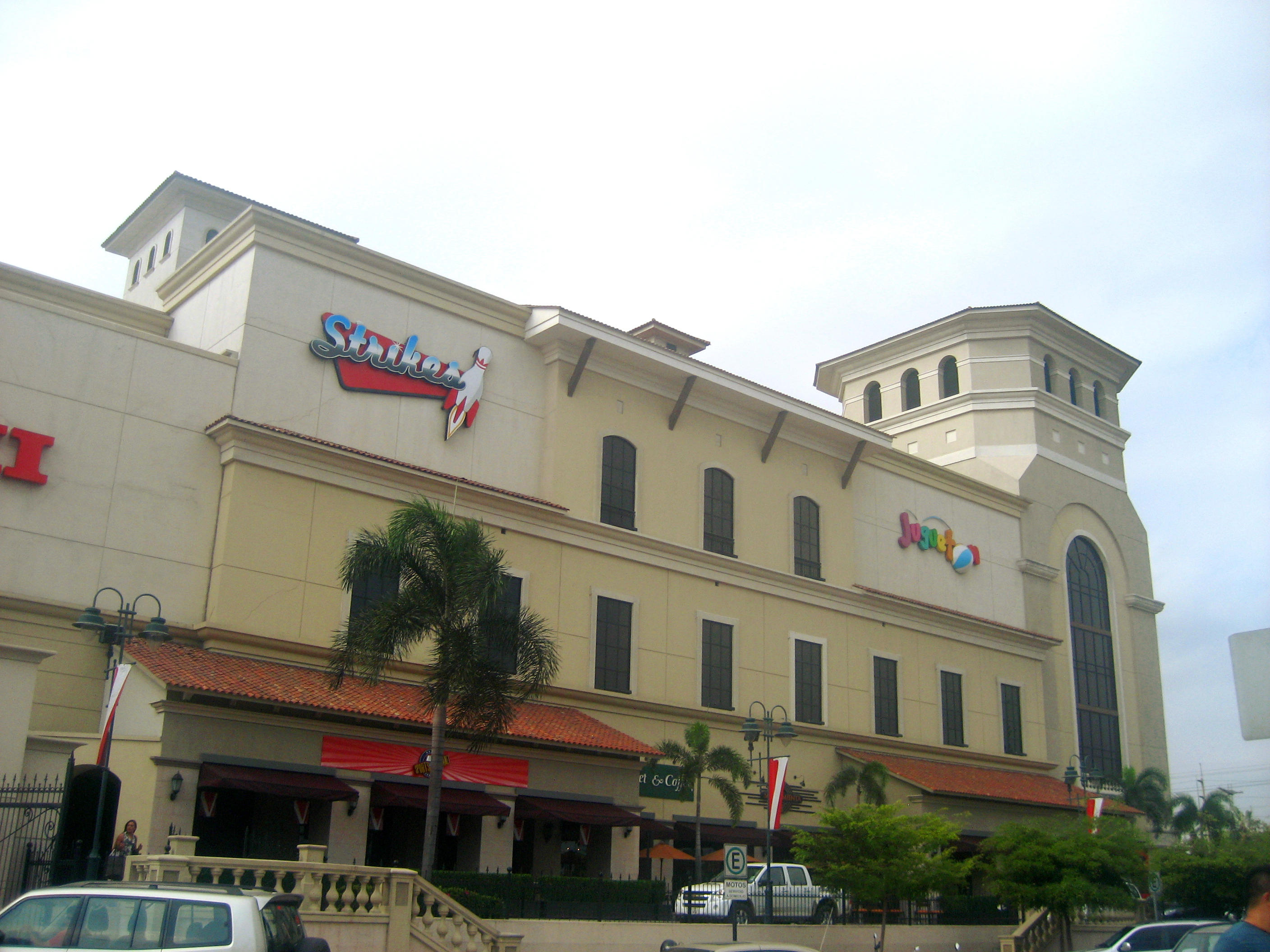
Village Plaza

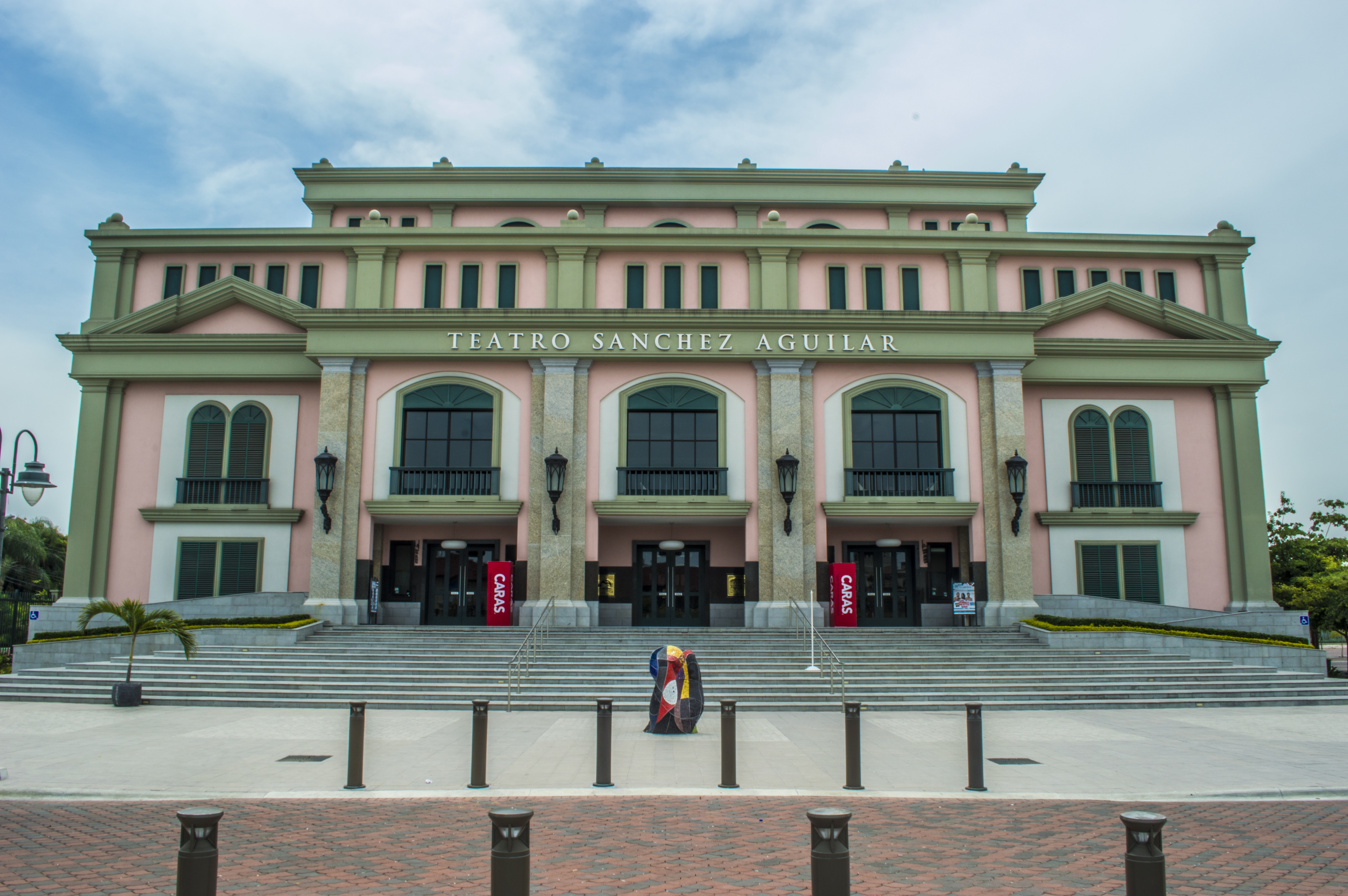
Sánchez Aguilar Theater

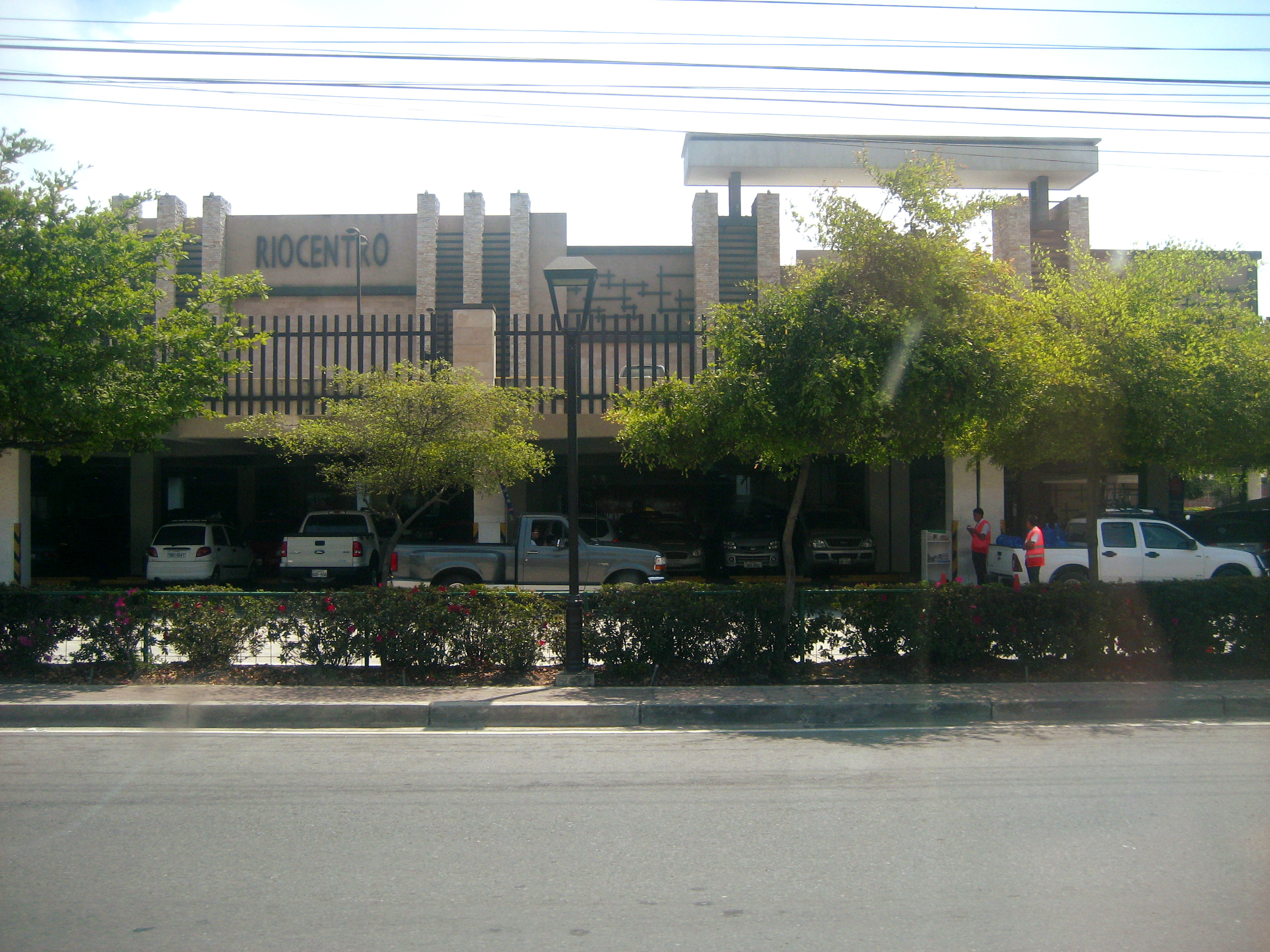
Riocentro Entre Ríos

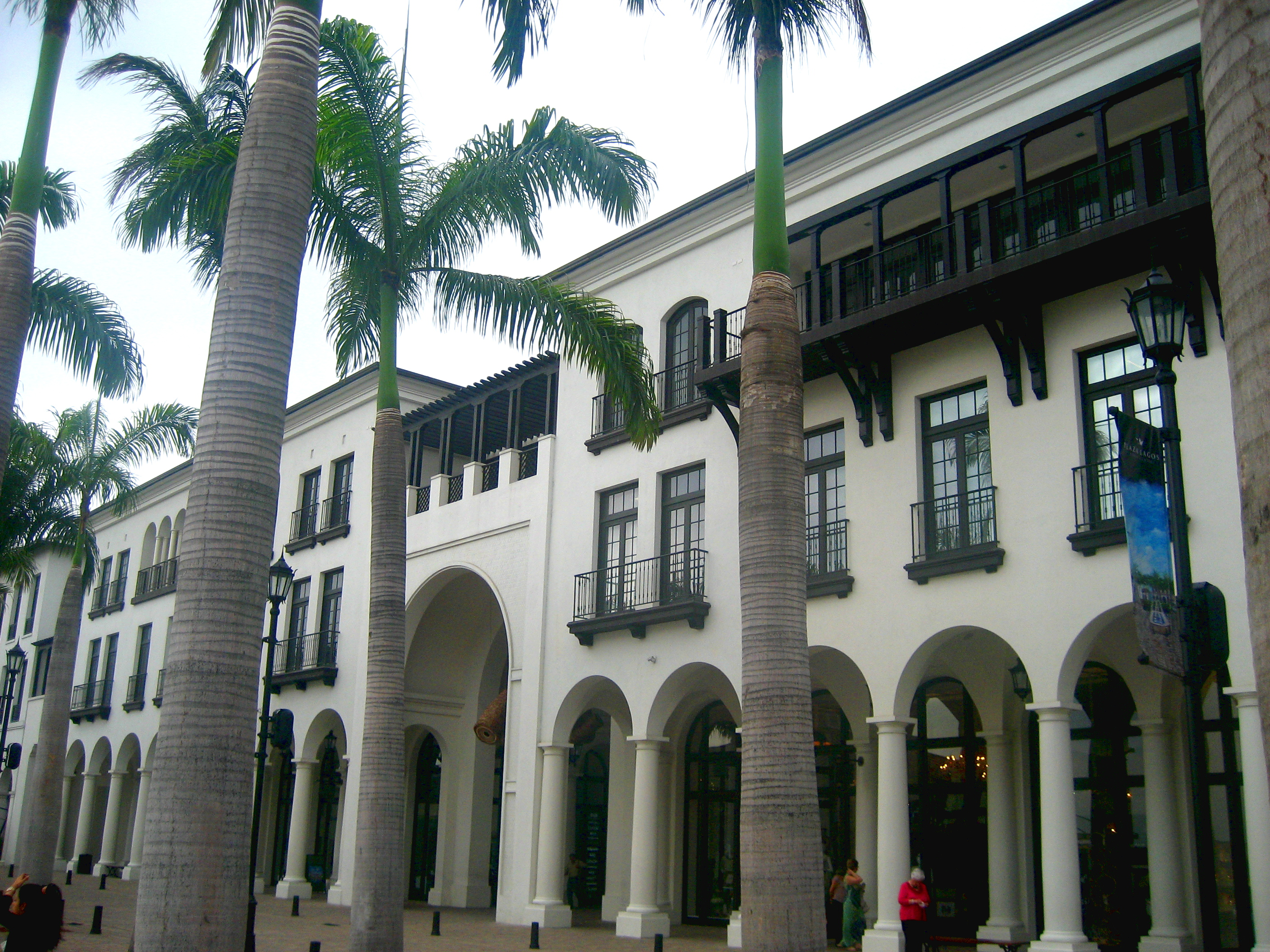
Plaza Lagos Town Center

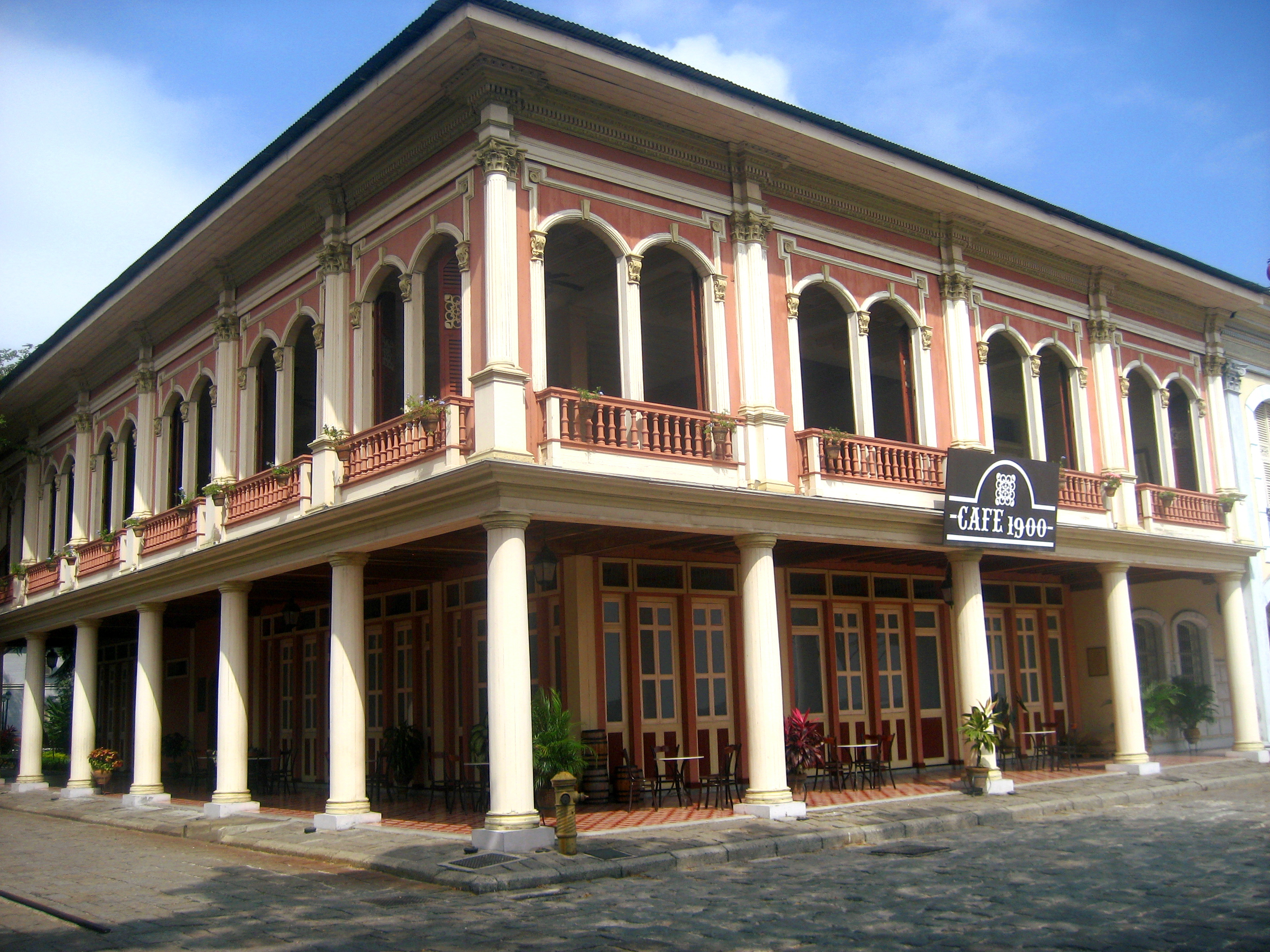
Parque Histórico Guayaquil
