= Lomas de Sargentillo Canton =

- Canton
- Location of Guayas in Ecuador.

- Lomas de Sargentillo Canton in Guayas Province
- Coordinates: 1°53′S 80°5′W
- Country: Ecuador
- Province: Guayas Province

Area
  - Total: 71.89 km^{2} (27.76 sq mi)

Population (2022 census)
  - Total: 22,254
  - Density: 309.6/km^{2} (801.7/sq mi)
- Time zone: UTC-5 (ECT)

Lomas de Sargentillo Canton is a canton of Ecuador, located in the Guayas Province. Its capital is the town of Lomas de Sargentillo. Its population at the 2001 census was 14,194.

== Demographics ==
Ethnic groups as of the Ecuadorian census of 2010:

- Mestizo 60.8%
- Montubio 28.4%
- Afro-Ecuadorian 6.4%
- White 4.3%
- Indigenous 0.0%
- Other 0.2%
