= Naranjito Canton =

- Canton
- Location of Guayas in Ecuador.

- Naranjito Canton in Guayas Province
- Coordinates: 2.1730°S 79.4671°W
- Country: Ecuador
- Province: Guayas Province
- Time zone: UTC-5 (ECT)

Naranjito Canton is a canton of Ecuador, located in the Guayas Province. Its capital is the town of Naranjito. Its population at the 2001 census was 31,756.

== Demographics ==
Ethnic groups as of the Ecuadorian census of 2010:

- Mestizo 71.2%
- Afro-Ecuadorian 8.3%
- Montubio 7.7%
- White 6.5%
- Indigenous 6.1%
- Other 0.3%
