= General Antonio Elizalde Canton =

- Canton
- Location of Guayas in Ecuador.

- Antonio Elizalde Canton in Guayas Province
- Coordinates: 2.20°S 79.17°W
- Country: Ecuador
- Province: Guayas Province
- Capital: Bucay (or: General Antonio Elizalde)

Area
  - Total: 141.8 km^{2} (54.7 sq mi)

Population (2022 census)
  - Total: 11,810
  - Density: 83.29/km^{2} (215.7/sq mi)
- Time zone: UTC-5 (ECT)

General Antonio Elizalde Canton or Bucay Canton is a canton of Ecuador, located in the Guayas Province. Its capital is the town of General Antonio Elizalde or Bucay. Its population at the 2001 census was 8,696.

== Demographics ==
Ethnic groups as of the Ecuadorian census of 2010:

- Mestizo 83.0%
- White 6.8%
- Afro-Ecuadorian 4.9%
- Montubio 3.2%
- Indigenous 1.8%
- Other 0.3%
