= Lomas de Sargentillo =

- Town
- Location within Ecuador
- Coordinates: 1.87984°S 80.08429°W
- Country: Ecuador
- Province: Guayas
- Canton: Lomas de Sargentillo

Area
  - Town: 4.61 km^{2} (1.78 sq mi)

Population (2022 census)
  - Town: 16,603
  - Density: 3,600/km^{2} (9,330/sq mi)

Lomas de Sargentillo is a town located in Guayas, Ecuador. It is the seat of Lomas de Sargentillo Canton, created in 1992.

Lomas de Sargentillo Canton is one of the smallest cantons in Guayas. Its area is 71.89 km^{2}. At the 2022 census, the canton had a population of 22,254.
