= Alfredo Baquerizo Moreno Canton =

Alfredo Baquerizo Moreno Juján
- Canton
- Flag

- Alfredo Baquerizo Canton in Guayas Province
- Coordinates: 01°55′S 079°31′W
- Country: Ecuador
- Province: Guayas

Area
  - Total: 228.6 km^{2} (88.3 sq mi)

Population (2022 census)
  - Total: 25,526
  - Density: 111.7/km^{2} (289.2/sq mi)

Alfredo Baquerizo Moreno is a canton of the province of Guayas in the Republic of Ecuador. Its official name was given in honor of Alfredo Baquerizo Moreno (1859 – 1951), who served three times as the president of Ecuador. It is also known as Juján, a name which came from a regional plant. The canton covers an area of 228.6 square kilometres (88.3 sq mi). Its canton seat is also known as Alfredo Baquerizo Moreno or Juján.

As of the census of 2001, there were 19,982 people residing within the canton limits.

== Demographics ==
Ethnic groups as of the Ecuadorian census of 2010:

- Mestizo 50.5%
- Montubio 38.0%
- Afro-Ecuadorian 6.9%
- White 4.2%
- Indigenous 0.3%
- Other 0.1%

== Geography ==
The Jujan canton is located in the west of the province of Guayas. It is bordered on the north by Los Ríos Province; on the south by Milagro Canton; on the east by the Simón Bolívar Canton; and on the west by the cantons of Samborondón and Yaguachi.
