= Santay Island =

Island of Ecuador

Coordinates: 2.2181°S 79.8536°W

Designations

Ramsar Wetland
- Official name: Isla Santay
- Designated: 31 October 2000
- Reference no.: 1041

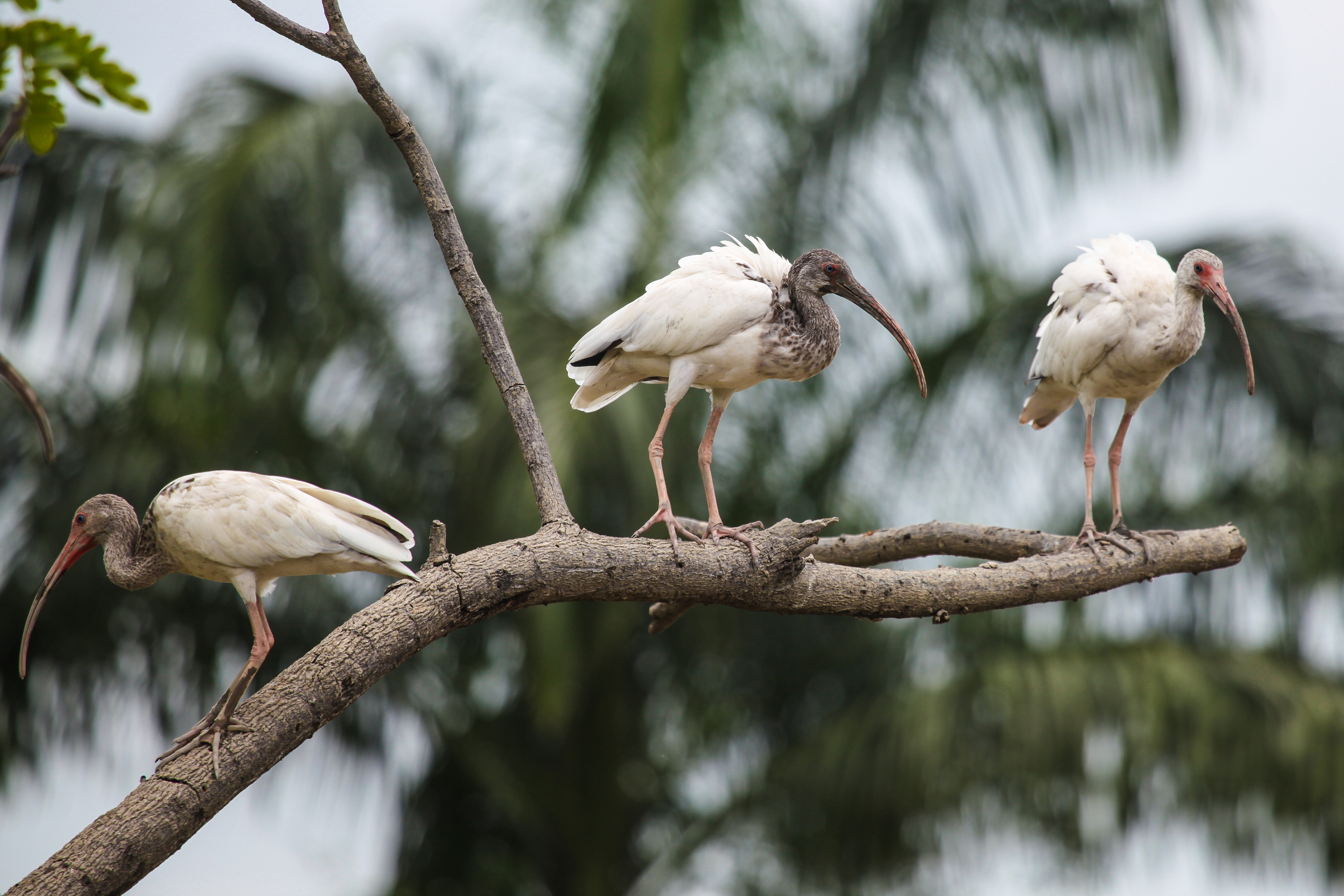
Santay is known for its mangrove ecosystem

Santay Island (Spanish Isla Santay) is a 2200 ha. island located in Guayas, Ecuador. It is part of the Durán Canton. It is surrounded by the Guayas River and populated by 47 families living there since the 1950s and before.

== Environment ==
The island is low-lying and subject to flooding by fluctuating water levels in the Guayas River. About 1,000 ha is mangrove covered. Other vegetation cover includes deciduous forest, natural savannas and cattle pasture. Santay has been declared a Ramsar site and the island is in the process of becoming a National Protected Area. The island has also been designated an Important Bird Area (IBA) by BirdLife International because it supports a significant population of resident red-masked parakeets.
