= Guayas Province =

Province of Ecuador

Coordinates: 2.2°S 79.9667°W

Guayas
- Province of Ecuador
- Province of Guayas; Provincia del Guayas (Spanish)
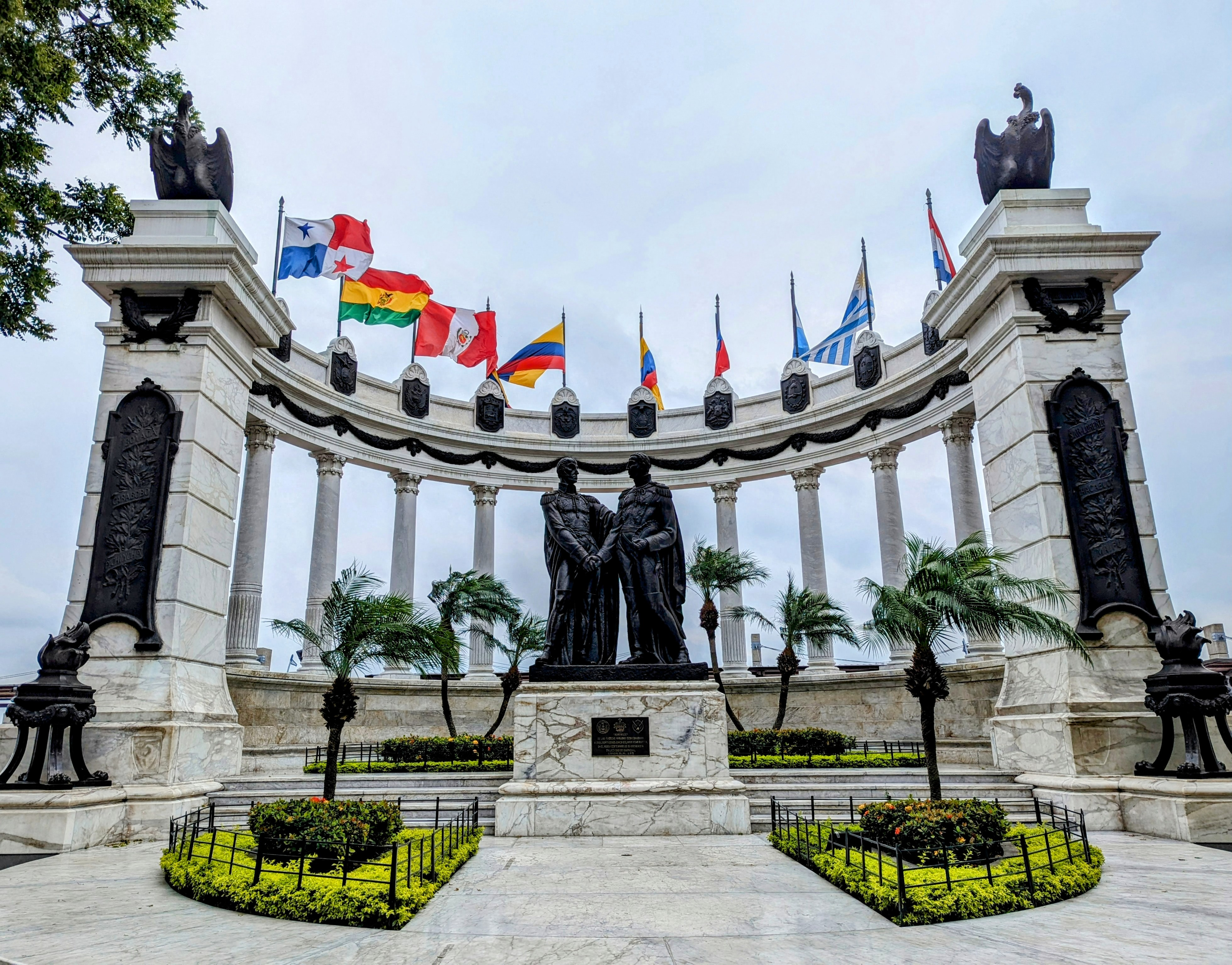
- Malecón 2000

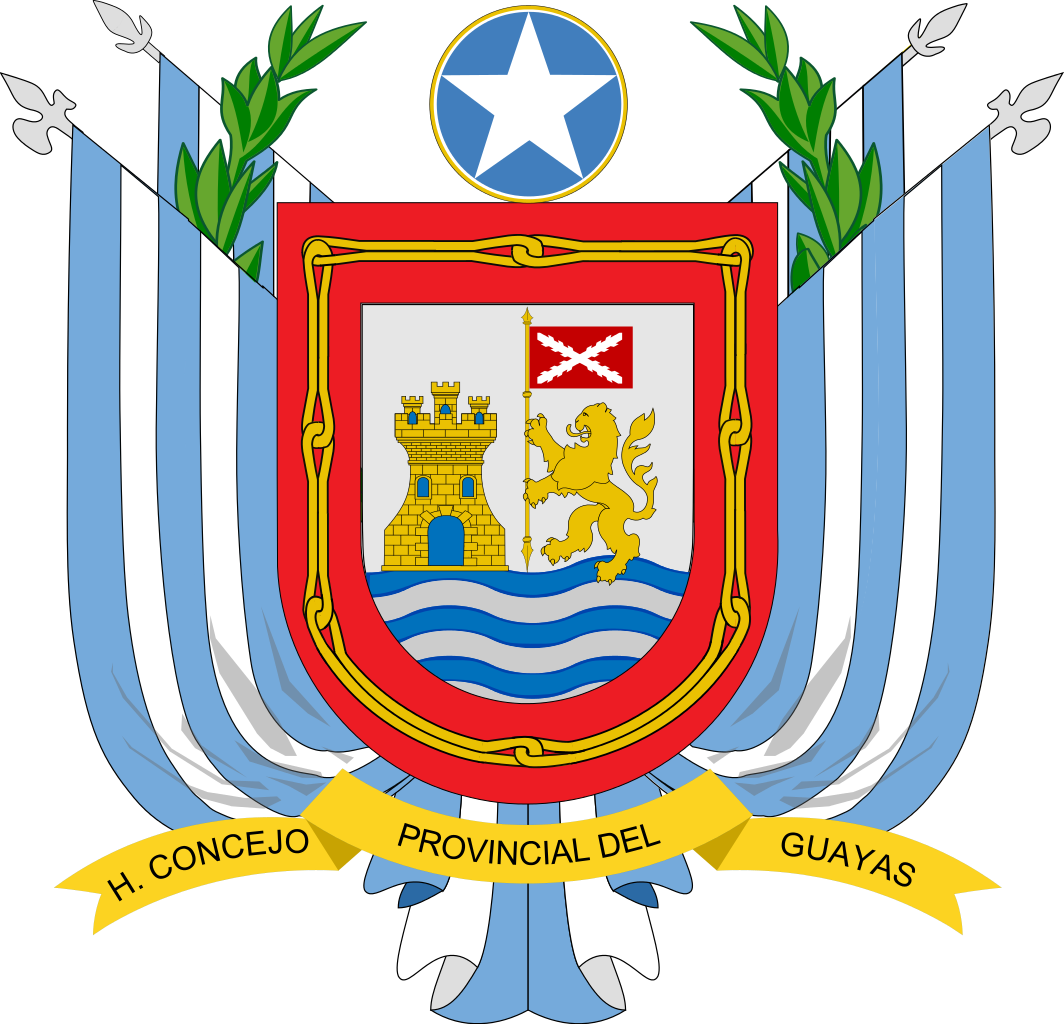
- Flag Seal
- Motto: Through the great Guayas
- Location of Guayas in Ecuador.

- Cantons of Guayas Province
- Country: Ecuador
- Established as an independent state: 9 October 1820
- Established as a province: May 22, 1824
- Capital and largest city: Guayaquil
- Cantons: List of cantons

Government
  - Prefect: Marcela Aguiñaga (RC)
  - Vice Prefect: Carlos Serrano
  - Governor: José Arévalo

Area
  - Total: 16,244 km^{2} (6,272 sq mi)

Population (2022 census)
  - Total: 4,391,923
  - Rank: 1st in Ecuador
  - Density: 270.37/km^{2} (700.26/sq mi)
- Demonym: Guayasense
- Vehicle registration: G
- HDI (2017): 0.768 high · 4th
- Website: www.guayas.gob.ec

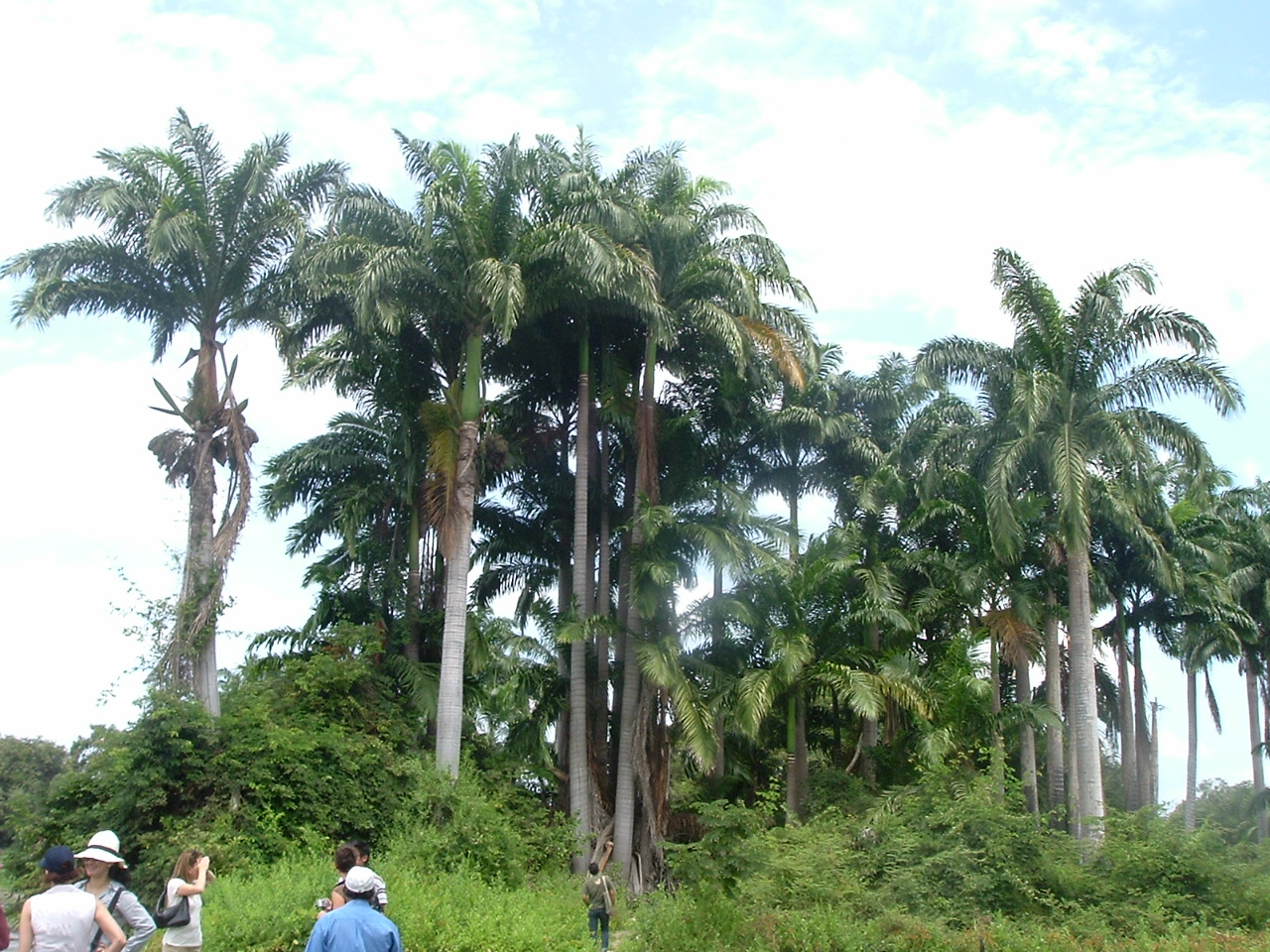
Palms on the Santay Island

Guayas (English: /ˈɡwɑːjəs/, Spanish: [ˈɡwaʝas]) is a coastal province in Ecuador. It is bordered to the west by Manabí, Santa Elena, and the Pacific Ocean (as the Gulf of Guayaquil); to the east by Los Ríos, Bolívar, Chimborazo, Cañar, and Azuay; to the north by Los Ríos and Bolívar; and to the south by El Oro and the Pacific Ocean. The provincial capital is Guayaquil, Ecuador’s largest city and main port.

With a population of over 4 million people, it is the most populous province in Ecuador. In terms of area it is the seventh largest province in the country.

== Geography ==
Guayas' natural terrain is very diverse. The province has no elevations, except for the Coastal Range, which starts in Guayaquil and goes to Manabí. The areas west of the Coastal Range are desertic, with an average temperature of 23 °C. The areas east of the range belong to the Guayas Watershed. They are quite humid and fertile, especially in the north of the province, with an average temperature of 30 °C in the humid season (December–May) and 25 °C in the dry season (June–November).

=== Hydrography ===
The most important river in the province is the Daule River, which flows from the north to join the Babahoyo River to form the Guayas river. The province is part of the largest river basin in South America west of the Andes Mountains.

=== Roads ===
Guayas has its own system for numbering roads. However, this system is unknown to most residents, so it is not regularly used.

The inter-provincial roads are also numbered with the national system. Even routes travel north–south; odd routes travel east–west. The inter-provincial roads that cross the province are the following:

- Ecuador Highway 15 (Vía del Pacífico; Pacific Way)
- Ecuador Highway 25 (Troncal de la Costa; Coastal Main Way)
- Ecuador Highway 40 (Transversal Austral; Austral Crossing Way)

== History ==
=== Pre-Hispanic cultures ===
The native culture living in Guayas is the Huancavilca culture. Exactly before the European discovery of America, the Huancavilca Culture was living in the province. Their descendants make up a large part of the population of the province.

=== Spanish conquest and independence ===
Guayaquil was founded on August 14, 1534 (its foundation is celebrated on July 25). During the Spanish conquest, Guayaquil became one of the most important ports in South America. The city became free on October 9, 1820, and the Guayaquil Department (one of the original subdivisions of Ecuador) was founded soon afterwards. It consisted of the Manabí Province, and the Guayaquil Province, which was later renamed Guayas. The Guayaquil Province included territory of what now is Peruvian Tumbes, and today's Los Ríos and El Oro. The provinces were separated from Guayas in 1860 and 1884, respectively.

=== Urbanization ===
Guayas is the most populous province in the country. In recent decades, there has been a massive exit from rural areas to the main cities (especially Guayaquil). This has created a problem in Guayaquil, as most of the migrants move to municipal areas, creating shantytowns, with no services like water or electricity.

== Demographics ==
Guayas is the most populous province in the country. The estimated population of the province in 2003 was about 3,360,000 people. A large percentage of the population are mestizos, i.e. descendants of both Spanish and indigenous peoples, there are also big communities of people that descend from Italians, Lebanese and German people.

Ethnic groups as of the Ecuadorian census of 2010:

- Mestizo 67.5%
- Montubio 11.3%
- White 9.8%
- Afro-Ecuadorian 9.7%
- Indigenous 1.3%
- Other 0.5%

== Population Growth ==
Guayas serves as the primary demographic engine of Ecuador, maintaining its position as the nation's most populous province through decades of explosive growth. In 1950, the region held a population of 612,417, which surged to over 1.4 million by 1970 as industrialization and maritime trade centered around Guayaquil accelerated.

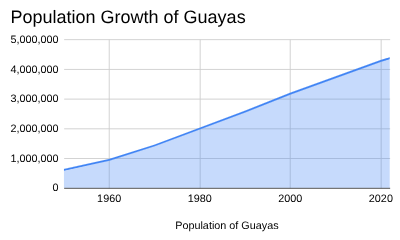
Guayas Pop Chart

By the turn of the millennium, the population had more than doubled again to 3,188,698. This rapid expansion continued into the 21st century, with the province crossing the four-million mark by 2020 "Guayas Population".. The 2022 census confirmed a total of 4,391,923 residents, solidifying Guayas as a critical hub of urban and economic development in the coastal region.

== Political divisions ==
The province is divided into 25 cantons. The following table lists each with its population at the time of the 2010 census, its area in square kilometres (km^{2}), and the name of the canton seat or capital.

Canton	Pop. (2010)	Area (km^{2})	Seat/Capital
Alfredo Baquerizo Moreno	25,179	216	Alfredo Baquerizo Moreno (Jujan)
Balao	20,523	465	Balao
Balzar	53,937	1,173	Balzar
Colimes	23,423	758	Colimes
Coronel Marcelino Maridueña	12,033	255	Coronel Marcelino Maridueña
Daule	120,326	462	Daule
Durán	235,769	339	Eloy Alfaro (Durán)
El Empalme	74,451	711	Velasco Ibarra (El Empalme)
El Triunfo	44,778	389	El Triunfo
General Antonio Elizalde	10,642	152	General Antonio Elizalde (Bucay)
Guayaquil	2,350,915	5,237	Guayaquil
Isidro Ayora	10,870	492	Isidro Ayora
Lomas de Sargentillo	18,413	67	Lomas de Sargentillo
Milagro	166,634	401	Milagro
Naranjal	69,012	2,015	Naranjal
Naranjito	37,186	226	Naranjito
Nobol	19,600	128	Narcisa de Jesús (Nobol)
Palestina	16,065	194	Palestina
Pedro Carbo	43,436	927	Pedro Carbo
Playas	41,935	269	General Villamil (Playas)
Salitre	57,402	390	Salitre
Samborondón	67,590	388	Samborondón
Santa Lucía	38,923	348	Santa Lucía
Simón Bolívar	25,483	289	Simón Bolívar
Yaguachi	60,958	512	Yaguachi

== See also ==
- Provinces of Ecuador
- Cantons of Ecuador
