= Atahualpa Canton =

- Canton
- Location of El Oro Province in Ecuador.

- Atahualpa Canton in El Oro Province

- Location within Ecuador
- Coordinates: 2°54′S 78°56′W
- Country: Ecuador
- Province: El Oro Province
- Time zone: UTC-5 (ECT)

Atahualpa Canton is a canton of Ecuador, located in the El Oro Province. Its capital is the town of Paccha. Its population at the 2001 census was 5,479.

== Demographics ==
Ethnic groups as of the Ecuadorian census of 2010:

- Mestizo 85.3%
- Montubio 7.2%
- White 6.0%
- Afro-Ecuadorian 1.3%
- Indigenous 0.1%
- Other 0.1%
