= Colimes =

Town in Guayas, Ecuador

- Town
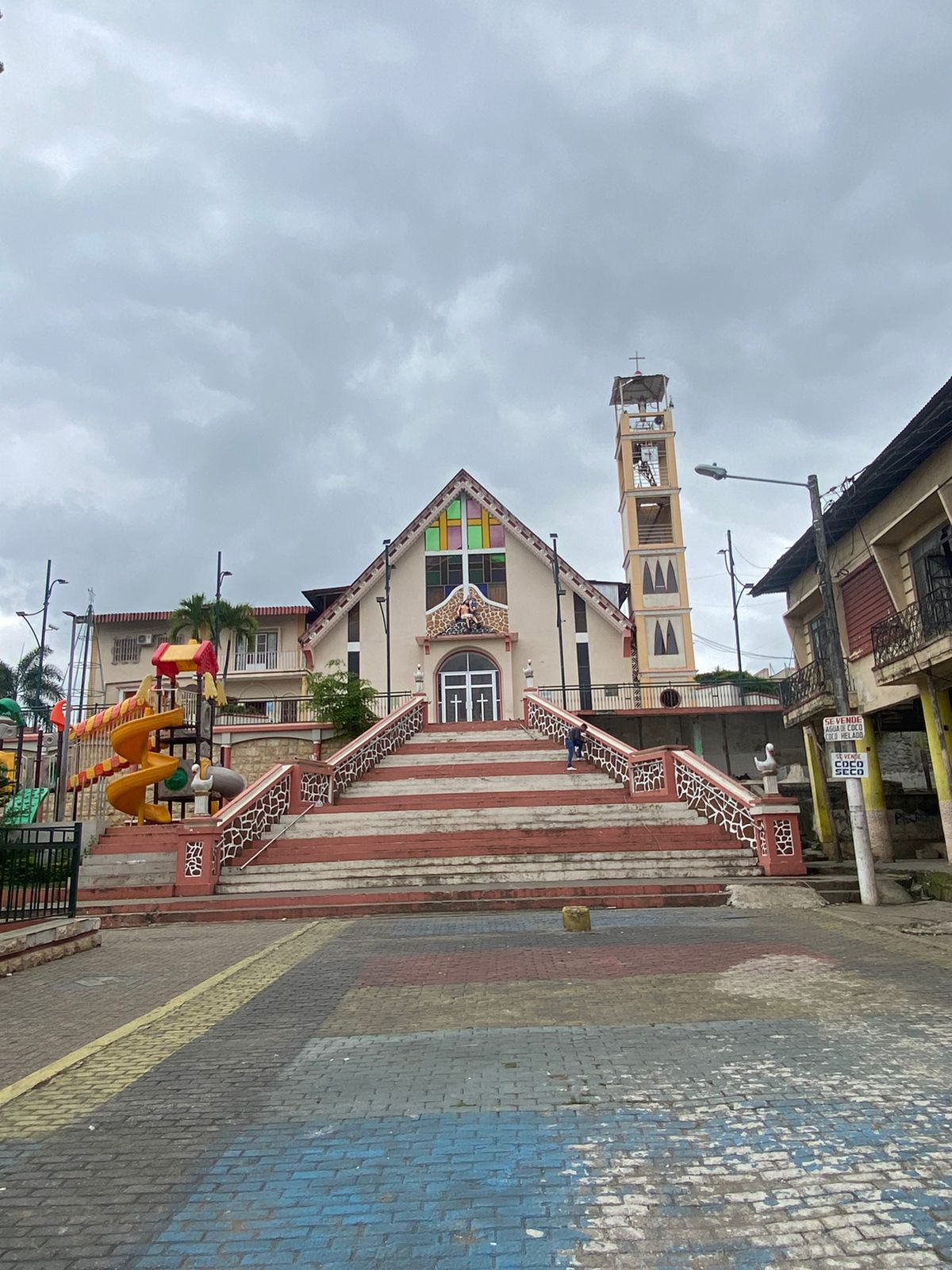
- Iglesia Santa Rosa of Colimes

- Flag

- Location within Ecuador
- Coordinates: 1.54601°S 80.01084°W
- Country: Ecuador
- Province: Guayas
- Canton: Colimes Canton

Area
  - Town: 3.06 km^{2} (1.18 sq mi)

Population (2022 census)
  - Town: 7,619
  - Density: 2,490/km^{2} (6,450/sq mi)

Colimes is a town located in northern Guayas, Ecuador, on the Daule River. It is the seat of Colimes Canton.

As of the census of 2022, Colimes Canton had a population of 26,251.

Its most important crops are: rice, cocoa, and coffee.
