= Simón Bolívar Canton =

- Canton
- Location of Guayas in Ecuador.

- Simón Bolívar Canton in Guayas Province
- Coordinates: 2°9′24″S 79°53′15″W
- Country: Ecuador
- Province: Guayas Province

Area
  - Total: 290.6 km^{2} (112.2 sq mi)

Population (2022 census)
  - Total: 29,427
  - Density: 101.3/km^{2} (262.3/sq mi)
- Time zone: UTC-5 (ECT)

Simón Bolívar Canton is a canton of Ecuador, located in the Guayas Province. Its capital is the town of Simón Bolívar. Its population at the 2001 census was 20,385.

== Demographics ==
Ethnic groups as of the Ecuadorian census of 2010:

- Mestizo 67.9%
- Montubio 20.9%
- Afro-Ecuadorian 6.3%
- White 4.4%
- Indigenous 0.4%
- Other 0.2%
