= Babahoyo River =

River of Ecuador

Coordinates: 2.14°S 79.85°W

The Babahoyo River is a river in western Ecuador, fed by tributaries rising in the Andes Mountains. It takes its name from the town of Babahoyo in Los Ríos. At Durán, it joins the Daule River to form the Guayas River, which continues to the Pacific Ocean.

The river is the backbone of trade in the city of the same name. Much of west-central Ecuadorian agricultural produce, especially rice, sugarcane, fruits, balsa wood, and tagua nuts are grown here.

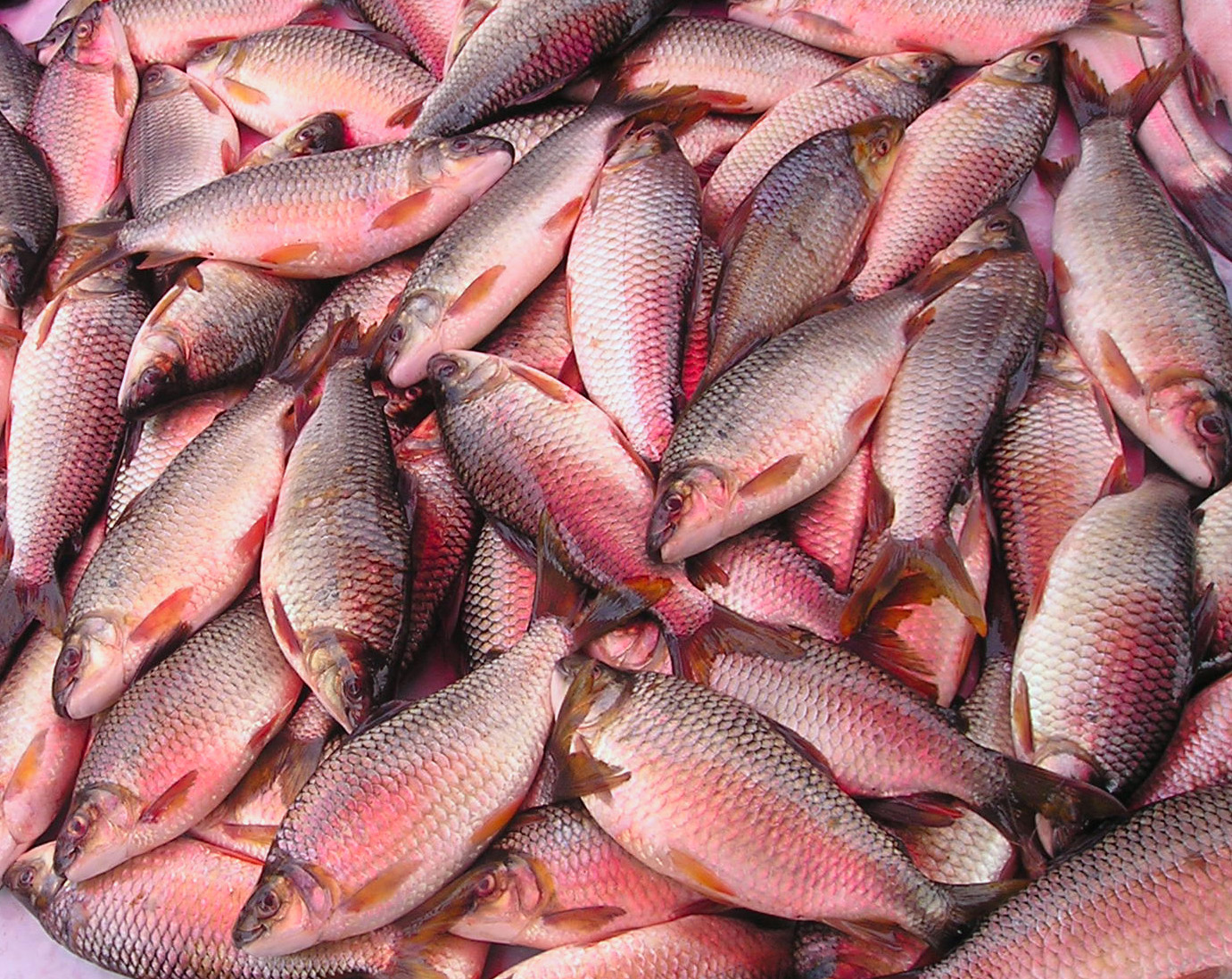
A major haul of fish from the Babahoyo River
