= Bucay, Ecuador =

Town in Guayas Province, Ecuador

Bucay
- Town
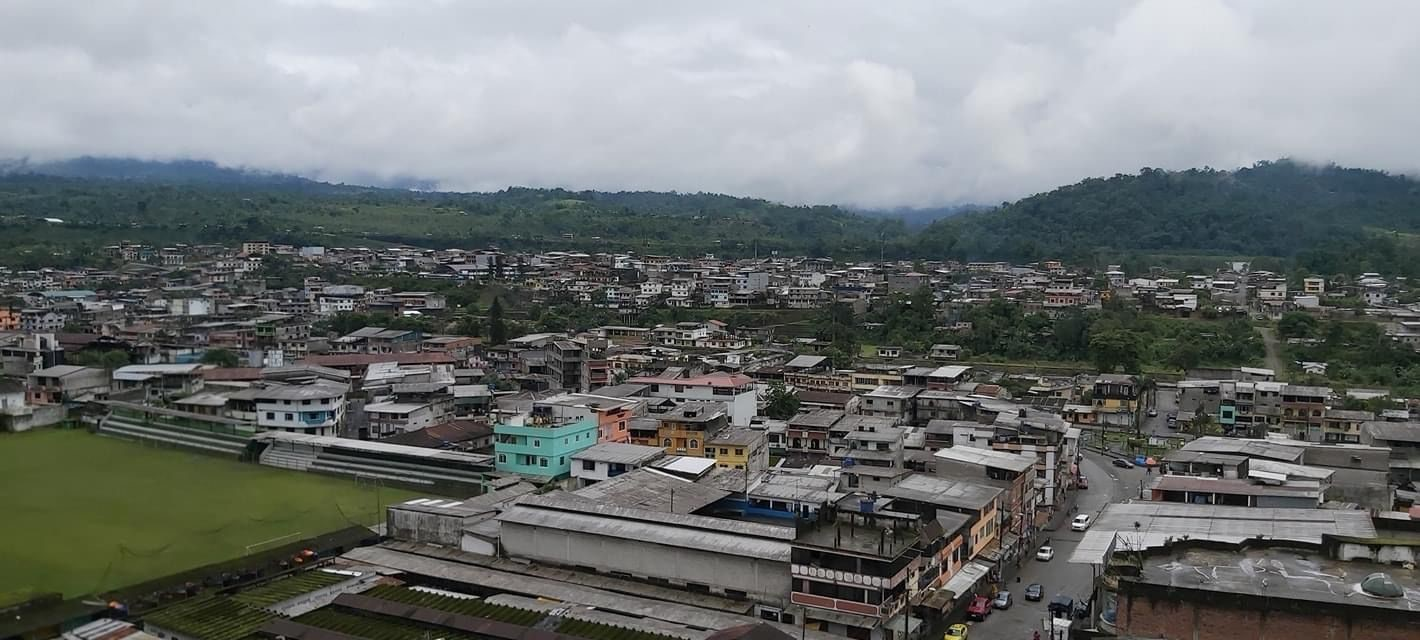
- View of Bucay

- Location within Ecuador
- Coordinates: 2.20179°S 79.13854°W
- Country: Ecuador
- Province: Guayas
- Canton: General Antonio Elizalde Canton

Area
  - Town: 3.84 km^{2} (1.48 sq mi)

Population (2022 census)
  - Town: 6,738
  - Density: 1,750/km^{2} (4,540/sq mi)

Bucay (also known as General Antonio Elizalde) is a town, with a population of 6,738 (2022 census), located on the eastern edge of Guayas, Ecuador, near the Chimborazo province. It is the seat of General Antonio Elizalde Canton (Bucay Canton). As of the census of 2022, the canton had a population of 11,810. This canton is one of the newest in Guayas, as it was created in 1995.
