= Colimes Canton =

- Canton
- Location of the Colimes Canton.
- Coordinates: 1°33′S 80°1′W
- Country: Ecuador
- Province: Guayas Province
- Capital: Colimes

Area
  - Total: 757.7 km^{2} (292.5 sq mi)

Population (2001)
  - Total: 26,251
  - Density: 34.65/km^{2} (89.73/sq mi)
- Time zone: UTC-5 (ECT)

Colimes Canton is a canton of Ecuador, located in the Guayas Province. Its capital is the town of Colimes. Its population at the 2001 census was 21,049.

== Demographics ==
Ethnic groups as of the Ecuadorian census of 2010:

- Montubio 46.2%
- Mestizo 44.3%
- Afro-Ecuadorian 5.6%
- White 3.8%
- Indigenous 0.1%
- Other 0.1%
