= Naranjal, Ecuador =

City of Guayas Province, Ecuador

Naranjal
- City
- Location within Ecuador
- Coordinates: 2.67747°S 79.61807°W
- Country: Ecuador
- Province: Guayas
- Canton: Naranjal Canton

Area
  - City: 8.19 km^{2} (3.16 sq mi)

Population (2022 census)
  - City: 39,323
  - Density: 4,800/km^{2} (12,400/sq mi)

Naranjal is a city located in southern Guayas Province, Ecuador, near Azuay Province. It is the seat of Naranjal Canton, created in 1960.

As of the census of 2022, the city had a population of 39,323. It is connected with Guayaquil and Machala.

== Climate ==
Climate data for Naranjal, elevation 30 m (98 ft), (1961–1990)
Month	Jan	Feb	Mar	Apr	May	Jun	Jul	Aug	Sep	Oct	Nov	Dec	Year
Mean daily maximum °C (°F)	31.7 (89.1)	31.7 (89.1)	32.4 (90.3)	32.4 (90.3)	31.1 (88.0)	29.7 (85.5)	28.3 (82.9)	28.8 (83.8)	29.1 (84.4)	29.2 (84.6)	29.7 (85.5)	31.3 (88.3)	30.5 (86.8)
Daily mean °C (°F)	26.2 (79.2)	26.2 (79.2)	26.6 (79.9)	26.7 (80.1)	26.1 (79.0)	25.0 (77.0)	24.1 (75.4)	24.0 (75.2)	24.0 (75.2)	24.0 (75.2)	24.3 (75.7)	25.6 (78.1)	25.2 (77.4)
Mean daily minimum °C (°F)	21.6 (70.9)	21.7 (71.1)	22.0 (71.6)	22.1 (71.8)	21.6 (70.9)	21.0 (69.8)	19.8 (67.6)	19.7 (67.5)	19.7 (67.5)	19.8 (67.6)	19.7 (67.5)	21.0 (69.8)	20.8 (69.5)
Average precipitation mm (inches)	186.0 (7.32)	215.0 (8.46)	225.0 (8.86)	154.0 (6.06)	73.0 (2.87)	35.0 (1.38)	9.0 (0.35)	9.0 (0.35)	13.0 (0.51)	16.0 (0.63)	17.0 (0.67)	33.0 (1.30)	985 (38.76)
Source: FAO
