= Palestina, Ecuador =

Palestina
- Town
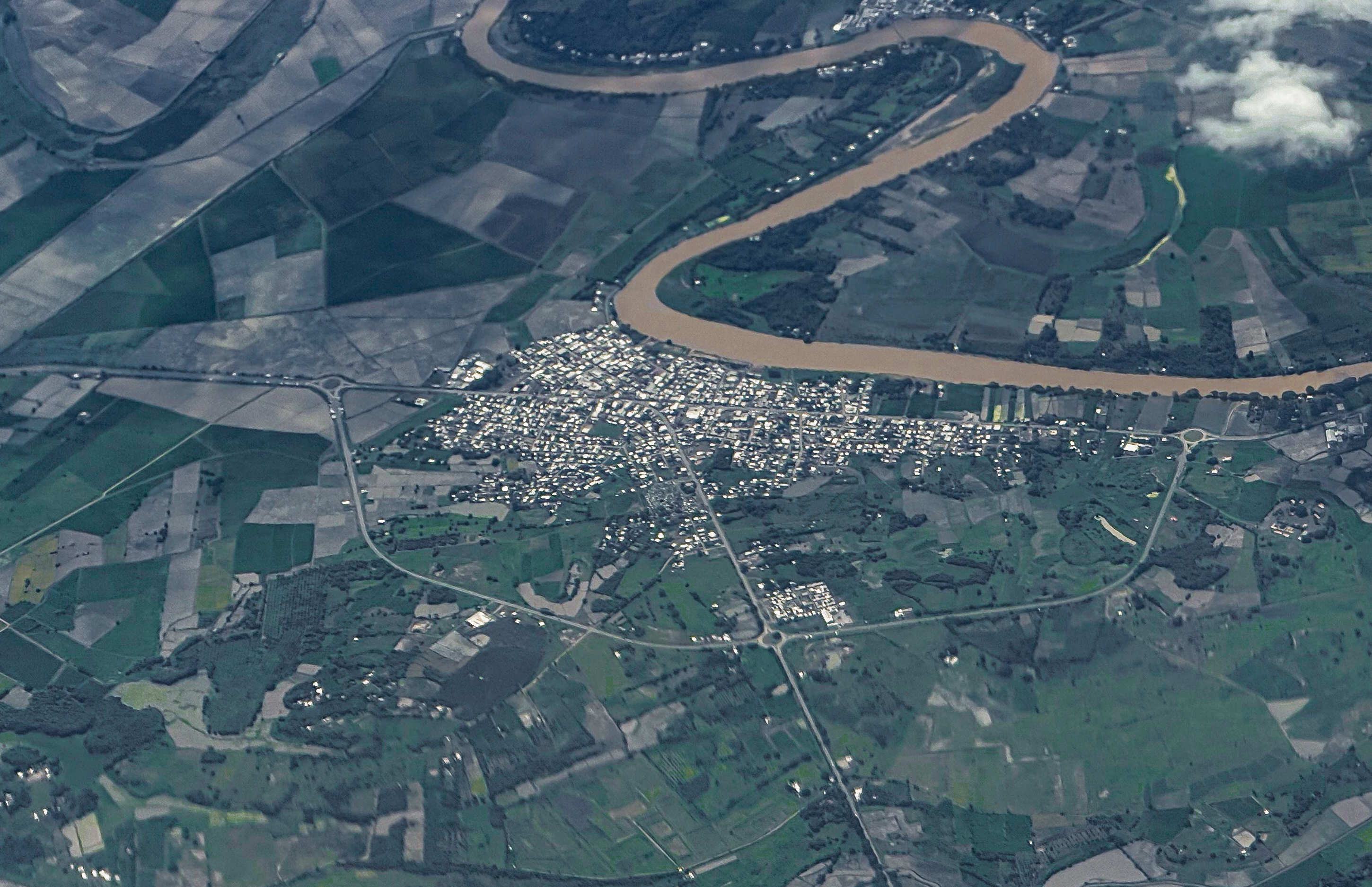
- Aerial image of Palestina in 2025

- Location within Ecuador
- Coordinates: 1.62669°S 79.98013°W
- Country: Ecuador
- Provinces of Ecuador: Guayas
- Canton: Palestina Canton

Area
  - Town: 2.53 km^{2} (0.98 sq mi)

Population (2022 census)
  - Town: 10,392
  - Density: 4,110/km^{2} (10,600/sq mi)

Palestina is a town located in northern Guayas, Ecuador. It is the seat of Palestina Canton, created in 1988.

As of the census of 2022, Palestina Canton had a population of 18,019.

The most important river is the Daule River, used for transportation. St Bartholomew is the patron saint of Palestina.
