= Samborondón Canton =

- Canton
- Location of Guayas in Ecuador.

- Samborondón Canton in Guayas Province
- Coordinates: 2°11′S 79°53′W
- Country: Ecuador
- Province: Guayas Province
- Capital: Samborondón

Area
  - Total: 344 km^{2} (133 sq mi)

Population (2022 census)
  - Total: 98,540
  - Density: 286/km^{2} (742/sq mi)
- Time zone: ECT

Samborondón Canton is a canton of Ecuador, located in the Guayas Province. Its capital is the town of Samborondón. Its population at the 2001 census was 45,476.

== Demographics ==
Ethnic groups as of the Ecuadorian census of 2010:

- Mestizo 48.7%
- Montubio 25.7%
- White 19.6%
- Afro-Ecuadorian 3.6%
- Indigenous 0.4%
- Other 0.7%
