= Alfredo Baquerizo Moreno (town) =

Alfredo Baquerizo Moreno (Juján)
- Town
- Location within Ecuador
- Coordinates: 01°55′S 079°31′W
- Country: Ecuador
- Province: Guayas
- Canton: A. Baquerizo Moreno (Juján)

Area
  - Town: 1.25 km^{2} (0.48 sq mi)

Population (2022 census)
  - Town: 6,035
  - Density: 4,830/km^{2} (12,500/sq mi)
- Climate: Aw

Alfredo Baquerizo Moreno is a town located in Guayas province in Ecuador. It lies along the boundary between Guayas and Los Ríos provinces. Its official name was given in honor of Alfredo Baquerizo Moreno (1859 – 1951), who served three times as the president of Ecuador. It is also known as Juján, a name is taken from a local tree. It was founded in 1892 by José Domingo Delgado (1844–1938).

The official population as of the 2010 census was 8,343 and as of the 2022 census its population has declined to 6,035 . It is the seat of the Alfredo Baquerizo Moreno canton (also known as Juján), which was created in 1986.

== See also ==
- Puerto Baquerizo Moreno
