= Durán Canton =

- Canton
- Location of Durán Canton in Guayas Province
- Coordinates: 2°10′S 79°50′W
- Country: Ecuador
- Province: Guayas Province
- Capital: Durán

Area
  - Total: 132 sq mi (342 km^{2})

Population (2022 census)
  - Total: 303,910
  - Density: 2,300/sq mi (889/km^{2})
- Time zone: UTC-5 (ECT)

Durán Canton is a canton of Ecuador, located in the Guayas Province. Its capital is the city of Durán. Its population at the 2001 census was 178,714.

The canton was created in 1986 during the presidential period of León Febres Cordero through a presidential decree.

== Demographics ==
Ethnic groups as of the Ecuadorian census of 2010:

- Mestizo 70.3%
- Afro-Ecuadorian 10.9%
- White 9.7%
- Montubio 5.7%
- Indigenous 2.9%
- Other 0.5%
