= El Empalme Canton =

Coordinates: 1°02′46″S 79°38′01″W

- Canton
- Location of Guayas in Ecuador.

- El Empalme Canton in Guayas Province
- Country: Ecuador
- Province: Guayas Province
- Capital: El Empalme
- Time zone: UTC-5 (ECT)

El Empalme Canton is a canton of Ecuador, located in the Guayas Province. Its capital is the town of El Empalme. Its population at the 2001 census was 64,789.

== Demographics ==
Ethnic groups as of the Ecuadorian census of 2010:

- Mestizo 61.3%
- Montubio 26.1%
- Afro-Ecuadorian 7.4%
- White 4.7%
- Indigenous 0.1%
- Other 0.3%
