= Balzar, Ecuador =

Balzar
- City
- Location within Ecuador
- Coordinates: 1.36609°S 79.90580°W
- Country: Ecuador
- Province: Guayas
- Canton: Balzar Canton

Area
  - City: 10.65 km^{2} (4.11 sq mi)

Population (2022 census)
  - City: 32,744
  - Density: 3,075/km^{2} (7,963/sq mi)

Balzar is a city located in northern Guayas Province, Ecuador, on the Daule River, near Los Ríos Province. It is the seat of Balzar Canton, and the agricultural center in northern Guayas.

As of the census of 2022, the city had a population of 32,744.

The most important river is the Daule River, used for transportation. Agriculture is the main activity. Rice, coffee and tobacco are the most important products. Balzar is famous throughout Ecuador for the tall tree located at the end of the main road. Balzar became a canton on September 26, 1903

== History ==
In 1964 a Danish agricultural engineer and pioneer in organic farming, bought the farm Hacienda Karen, located on the Rio Daule banks some miles from Balzar, from Shell director Hans Bach. Carl Vilhelm Dencker-Rasmussen, on purchasing the Hacienda, experimented in rubber planting, tobacco growing and rice planting. The rice planting was done at a strategically important time of the year when the rains came. Channels were dug like the rice fields Dencker-Rasmussen had seen in Malaysia many years before, resulting in successful crops. Rice had previously been brought in from outside and eventually became one of the important alternative staple diets for the region instead of the sweet potato and maize traditionally used.

== Climate ==
Climate data for Balzar, elevation 40 m (130 ft), (1971–2000)
Month	Jan	Feb	Mar	Apr	May	Jun	Jul	Aug	Sep	Oct	Nov	Dec	Year
Mean daily maximum °C (°F)	30.2 (86.4)	30.6 (87.1)	31.4 (88.5)	31.1 (88.0)	30.8 (87.4)	28.7 (83.7)	28.6 (83.5)	29.6 (85.3)	30.3 (86.5)	30.0 (86.0)	30.1 (86.2)	30.7 (87.3)	30.2 (86.3)
Mean daily minimum °C (°F)	21.4 (70.5)	22.0 (71.6)	22.4 (72.3)	22.4 (72.3)	21.9 (71.4)	20.8 (69.4)	20.0 (68.0)	20.0 (68.0)	20.0 (68.0)	20.4 (68.7)	20.0 (68.0)	21.1 (70.0)	21.0 (69.9)
Average precipitation mm (inches)	332.0 (13.07)	384.0 (15.12)	470.0 (18.50)	292.0 (11.50)	90.0 (3.54)	24.0 (0.94)	3.0 (0.12)	3.0 (0.12)	8.0 (0.31)	5.0 (0.20)	9.0 (0.35)	89.0 (3.50)	1,709 (67.27)
Average relative humidity (%)	81	82	85	83	84	84	84	79	77	78	76	77	81
Source: FAO
