= Naranjal Canton =

Canton of Guayas Province, Ecuador

Coordinates: 2.6728°S 79.6150°W

- Canton
- Location of Guayas Province in Ecuador

- Naranjal Canton in Guayas Province
- Country: Ecuador
- Province: Guayas

Area
  - Total: 1,702 km^{2} (657 sq mi)

Population (2022 census)
  - Total: 83,691
  - Density: 49.17/km^{2} (127.4/sq mi)

Naranjal is a canton in the province of Guayas in western continental Ecuador. The canton was created in 1960 and named after its seat, Naranjal.

== Demographics ==
Ethnic groups as of the Ecuadorian census of 2010:

- Mestizo 74.1%
- Montubio 10.9%
- Afro-Ecuadorian 8.7%
- White 5.5%
- Indigenous 0.7%
- Other 0.2%
