= Daule River =

River in Ecuador

Coordinates: 2.1589°S 79.8714°W

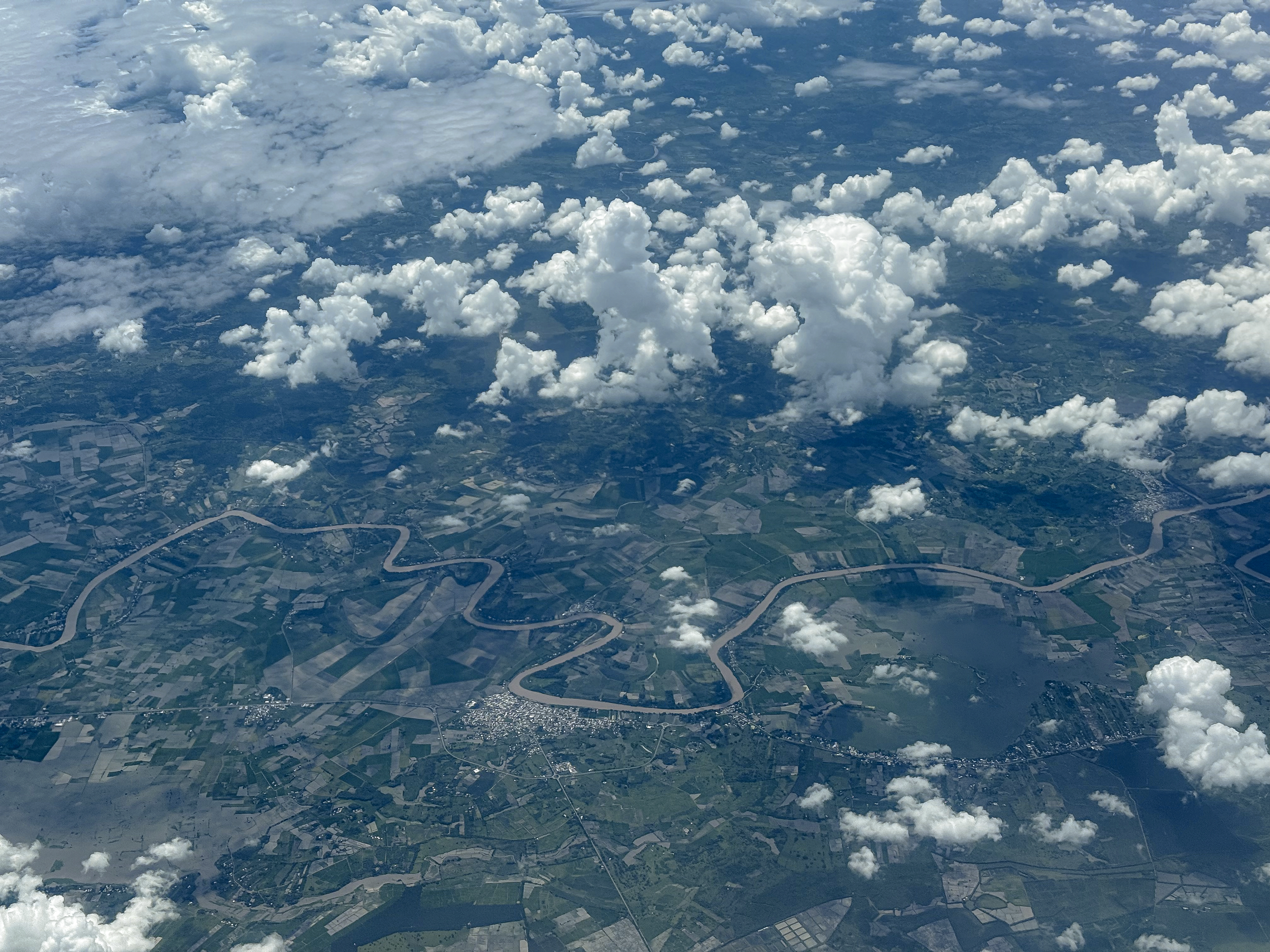
Daule River near Palestina, Ecuador

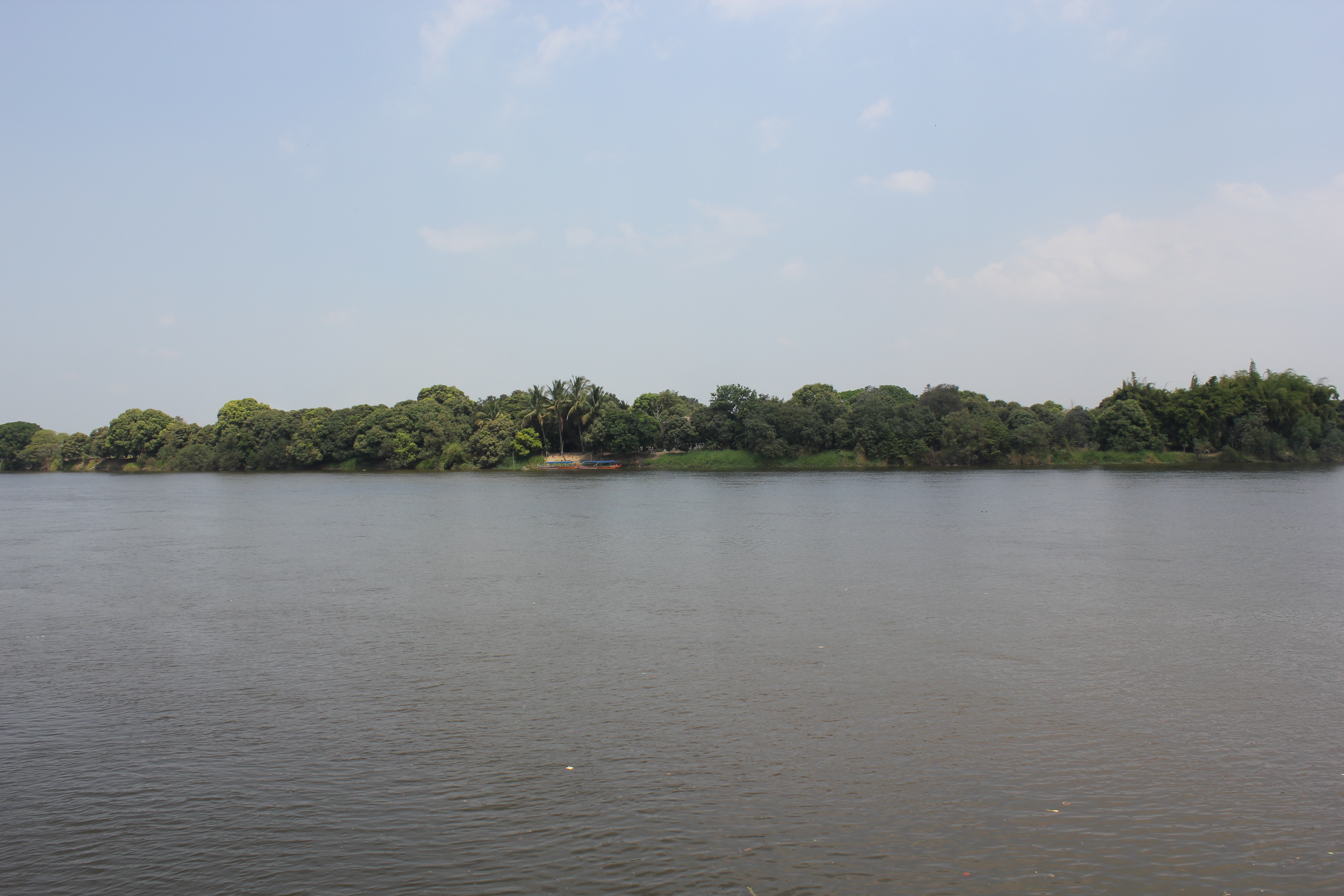
The Daule River as it passes through Nobol, Ecuador

The Daule River is a river in Ecuador, in Guayas Province. At Guayaquil, it joins the Babahoyo River; from that point the confluence becomes the Guayas River.

== Cities along the river ==
- El Empalme Canton
- Pichincha Canton
- Balzar
- Colimes
- Palestina
- Santa Lucía
- Daule
- Nobol
- Guayaquil
