= Our Lady of the Cloud Monument =

Monument Our Lady of the Cloud
- Monumento Nuestra Señora de la Nube
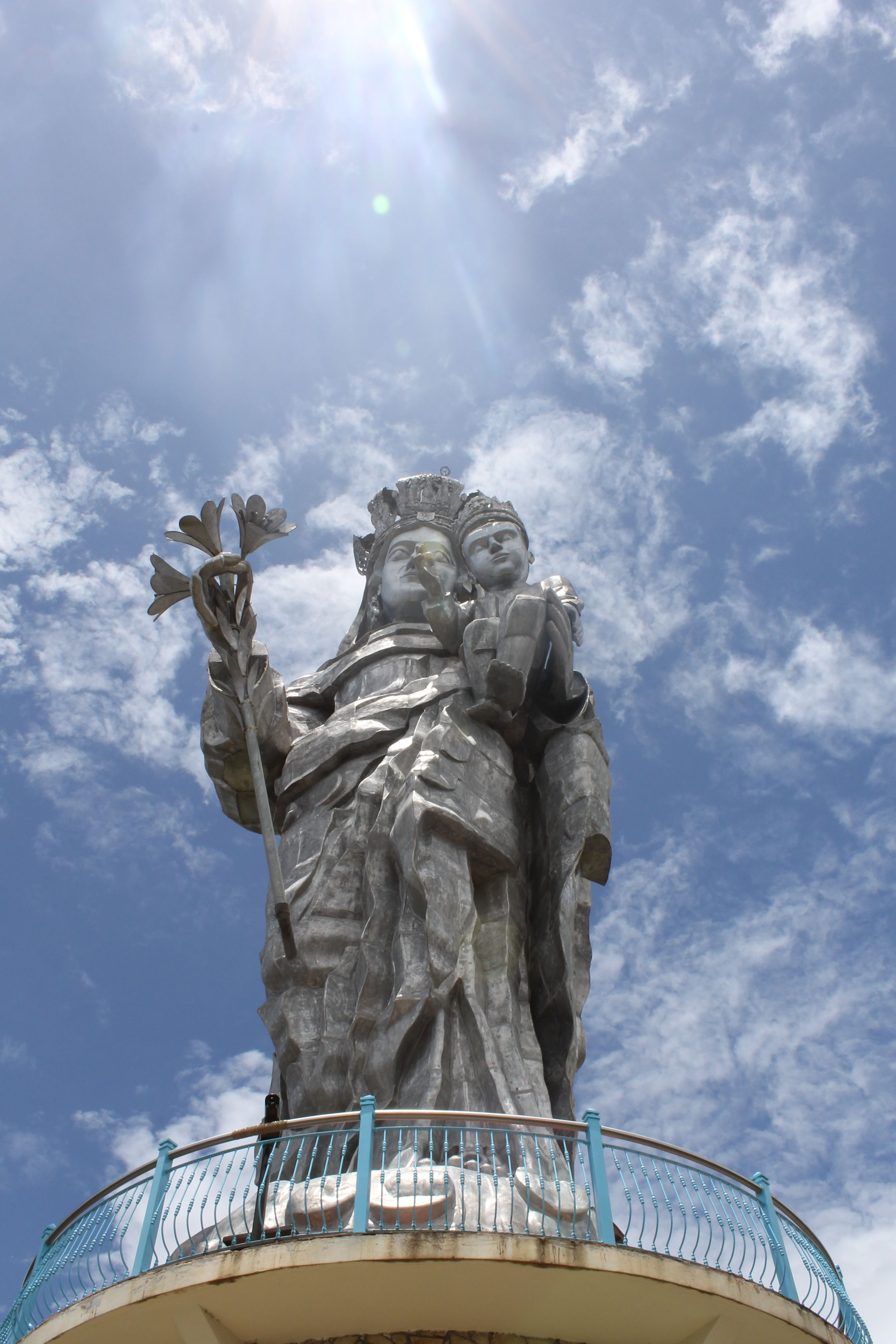
- The statue in 2019
- Interactive map of Monument Our Lady of the Cloud
- Location: Mount Abuga, Azogues, Ecuador
- Coordinates: 2°43′17″S 78°49′41″W
- Material: Alluminium plate
- Width: 25 metres (82 ft)
- Height: 30 metres (98 ft), 30 metres (98 ft) with its pedestal
- Completion date: Dedicated October 10, 2010

The Nuestra Señora de la Nube Monument, also known as Virgen de La Nube in El Abuga, is a religious monument on Abuga in the Cañar Province of Ecuador. It depicts the Virgin Mary holding the baby Jesus in her arms.

== History ==
Before the monument existed, there was only one resting place at the top of the hill. The idea of building the monument came from the Franciscan friar Fray Manuel García, who in 2004 conceived of the idea of creating a monument on the peak. From 2007 onwards, this work was carried out by a foundation created for this purpose. Controversy arose from the concern that the local vegetation was going to be damaged.

This monument was inaugurated on October 18, 2009, by the then IV Bishop of Azogues, Carlos Aníbal Altamirano Argüello, together with some Franciscan friars. The friars are custodians of the monument, which is part of the Sanctuary of the Virgin of Cloud.

== Description ==
The Virgin Mary is presented as a queen:

- In her right hand she holds a sceptre;
- A lily represents her breastplate;
- An olive tree is her fruit, a symbol of her connection with Israel;
- Her left arm holds the Child Jesus who carries the world in her hands.
- She serves as a pedestal for the moon and the clouds.

The statue has a height of 30 meters, whose base measures 5 meters and the Virgin has a height of 25 meters.

=== Religious meeting point ===
This monument is a meeting point during religious festivals such as the Stations of the Cross in Holy Week; throughout May, the month of the Virgin Mary; and before, during and after the party on January 1.

== Location ==
The Monument is located just 5 kilometers from the city center, at about 3,090 meters above sea level, on the top of Abuga. It can be seen from a long distance, including the top of Mount Zhalao in the city of Biblian and from Cerro Cojitambo.
