= El Tambo Canton =

- Canton
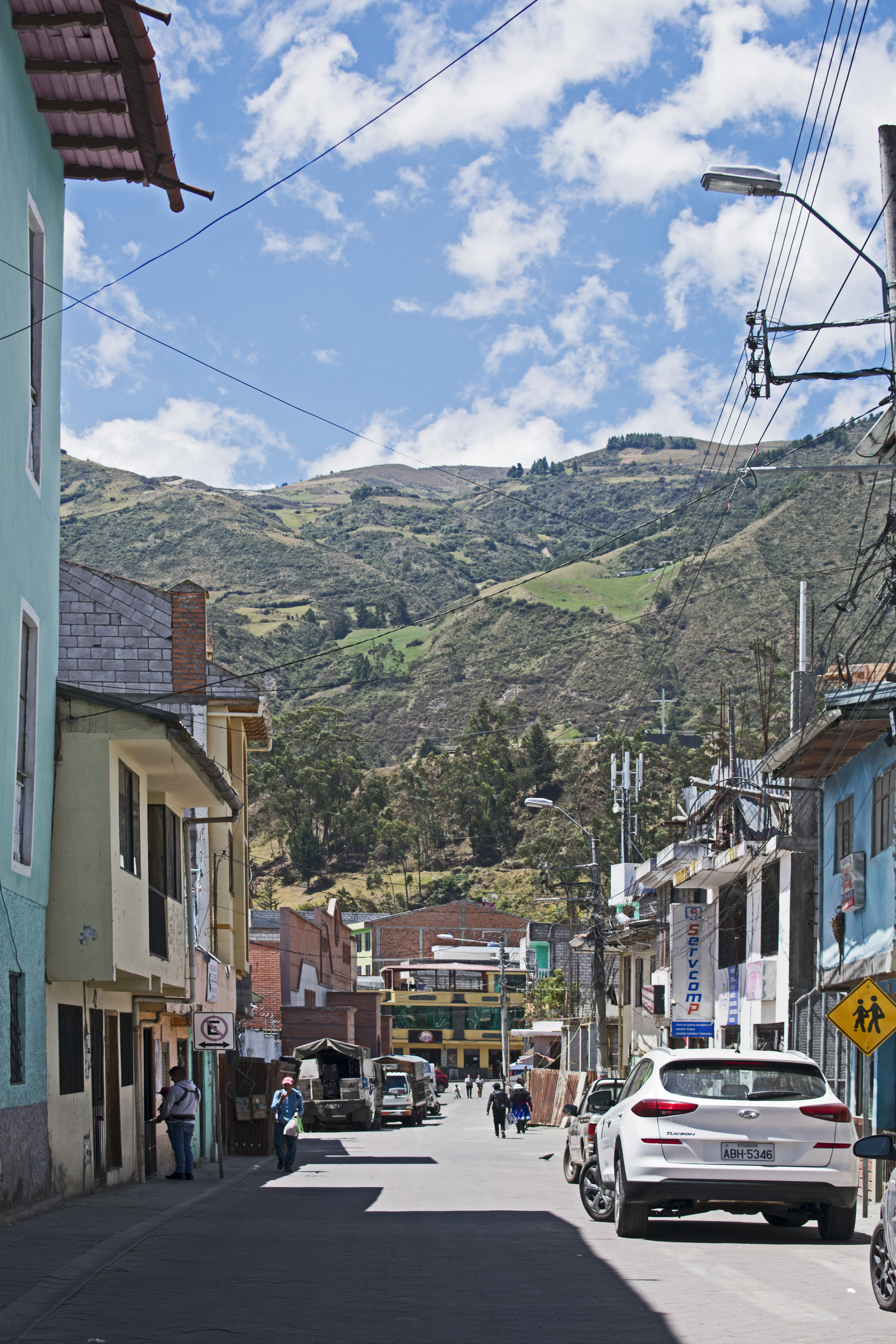
- El Tambo and the Andes

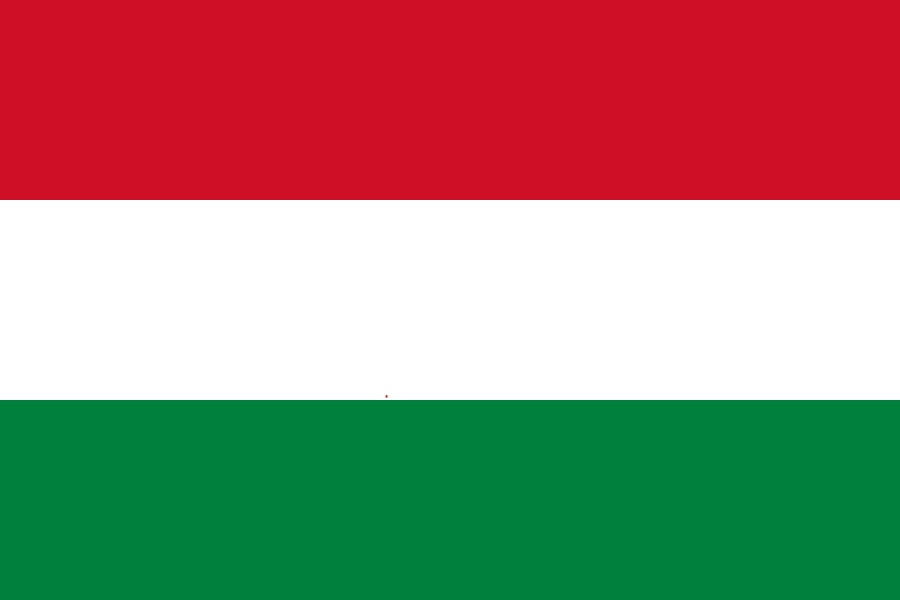
- Flag

- Location of Cañar Province in Ecuador.

- El Tambo Canton in Cañar Province
- Coordinates: 2.5081°S 78.9249°W
- Country: Ecuador
- Province: Cañar Province
- Time zone: UTC-5 (ECT)
- Postal code: 030202

El Tambo is one of seven cantons located in Cañar Province, Ecuador. It is situated along the PanAmerican Highway in a valley across from the larger town of Cañar. The canton is fully surrounded by Cañar Canton. The population of El Tambo is a mix of mestizo and indigenous Cañari. The seat of the canton is the town of El Tambo.

The canton was established on 24 January 1991. Its name comes from the Kichwa “tambu” which means “place of rest or inn”.

The majority of the population of El Tambo is a mixture of indigenous and mestizo people who are dedicated to agricultural activities, thus taking advantage of the fertility of its soil. El Tambo is distinguished by its cultural and historical wealth. About 30 minutes out of El Tambo is the town of Ingapirca named after the Incan ruins that are there. The ruins of Ingapirca are the largest Incan ruins in Ecuador.
