= Cañari =

Native tribe in Ecuador

Cañari Kañari
- 500–1533
- Location of Cañar in Ecuador

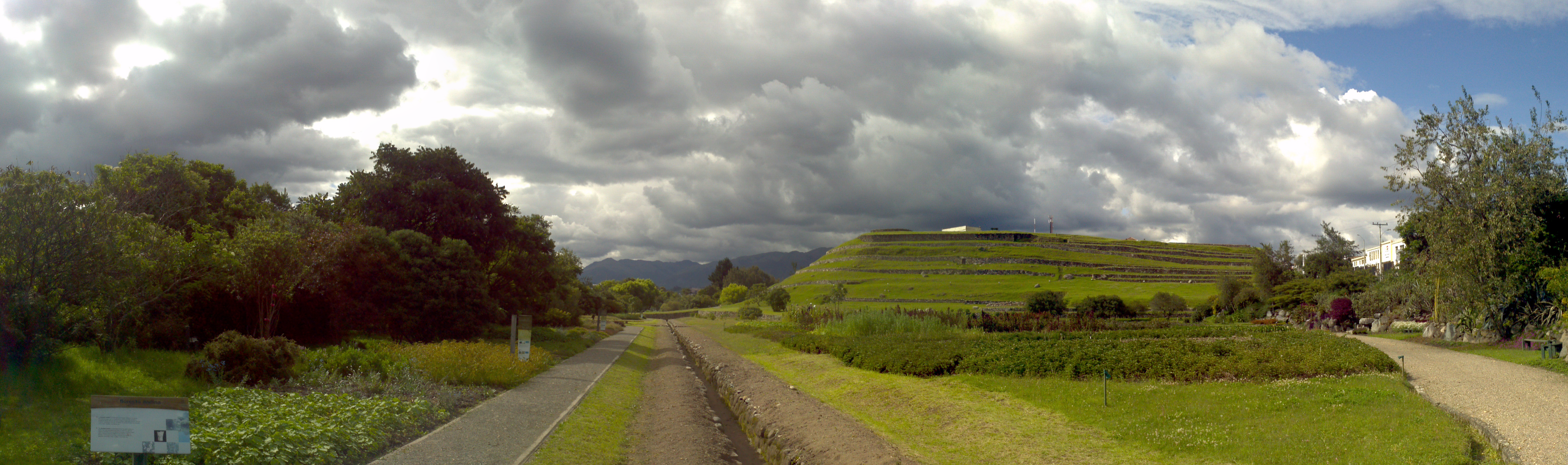
- Panoramic view of part of the ruins of Pumapungo in Cuenca, Ecuador.
- Status: Civilization
- Capital: Tumebamba
- Common languages: Originally Cañari (now extinct), Kichwa, Spanish
- Religion: Polytheist
- Government: Diarchy
- Historical era: Integration
  - Established: 500
  - Disestablished: 1533
Preceded by	Succeeded by
Tuncahuán	Inca Empire

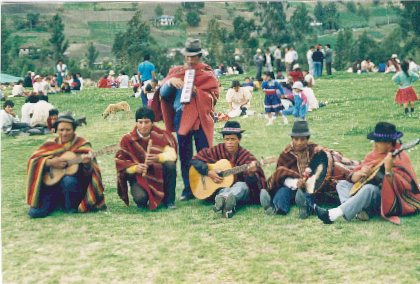
Cañari musicians

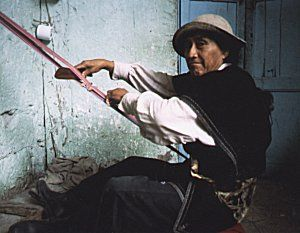
A Cañari weaver at his loom

The Cañari (in Kichwa: Kañari) are an indigenous ethnic group traditionally inhabiting the territory of the modern provinces of Azuay and Cañar in Ecuador. They are descended from the independent pre-Columbian tribal confederation of the same name. The historic people are particularly noted for their resistance against the Inca Empire. Eventually conquered by the Inca in the early 16th century shortly before the arrival of the Spanish, the Cañari later allied with the Spanish against the Inca. Today, the population of the Cañari, who include many mestizos, numbers in the thousands.

The earlier people defended their territory for many years against numerous Incan armies. Túpac Yupanqui conquered the Huancabambas, the most southern of the Cañari allies. Through wars and marriages, the Inca Empire under the lead of Huayna Capac to the north finally conquered their territory. The Cañari were loosely assimilated into the vast empire, allowed to manage their own affairs but adopting a new language for communicating with the Inca.

The tribe primarily occupied the Tumebamba area (present day Cuenca). Due in part to Incan influence and mandate, Cañari construction reportedly rivaled that of the Incan capital, Cuzco. Of particular repute was the impressive architecture of Tumebamba, which has often been referred to as the "second Cuzco."

During the Inca Civil War between the sons of Huayna Capac, the Cañari chose to support Huáscar, despite being positioned in the northern area inherited by the son and heir Atahualpa. Initially, Huáscar's generals Atoc and Hango were successful, defeating Atahualpa's army, capturing many of his soldiers, and seizing the large cities Cajamarca and Tumebamba.

Aided by his father's loyal generals, Atahualpa managed to rout the Huáscaran army in the battles of Mullihambato and Chimborazo. This forced the interlopers back to the south. He captured and executed Huascar's generals and executed the Cañari supporters once he reached Tumebamba.

== Origins ==
The word Cañari comes from "kan" meaning "snake" and "ara" meaning "macaw". According to some linguists, it means the Cañari believed their ancestors were the snake and the macaw. Another explanation is that they considered these animals sacred, as is demonstrated by stories and designs. Within the great Cañari family, there were groups with their own cultures. One of these was the Peleusis, which was located in the area of the modern city of Azogues and had hegemony over neighbouring tribes.

According to a traditional story, the location of the Pelusis was founded by the caciques Tenemaza and Carchipulla. These surnames still exist in the province.

=== Myth ===
Scholars have found that the Cañari had an oral tradition of a massive flood as part of their creation stories, similar to those of the Bible and Gilgamesh. According to myth, it was said that a giant flood occurred in which everyone perished except two brothers who had perched on top of a high mountain. After the flood, both brothers returned to their hut. They found it had been repaired and stocked with prepared food. Every day when they returned to the hut, they found prepared food. Eventually they learned that two female beings with a macaws face had made the food. One of the brothers took the younger of these beings as his wife, and the world was repopulated with their offspring.

== History ==
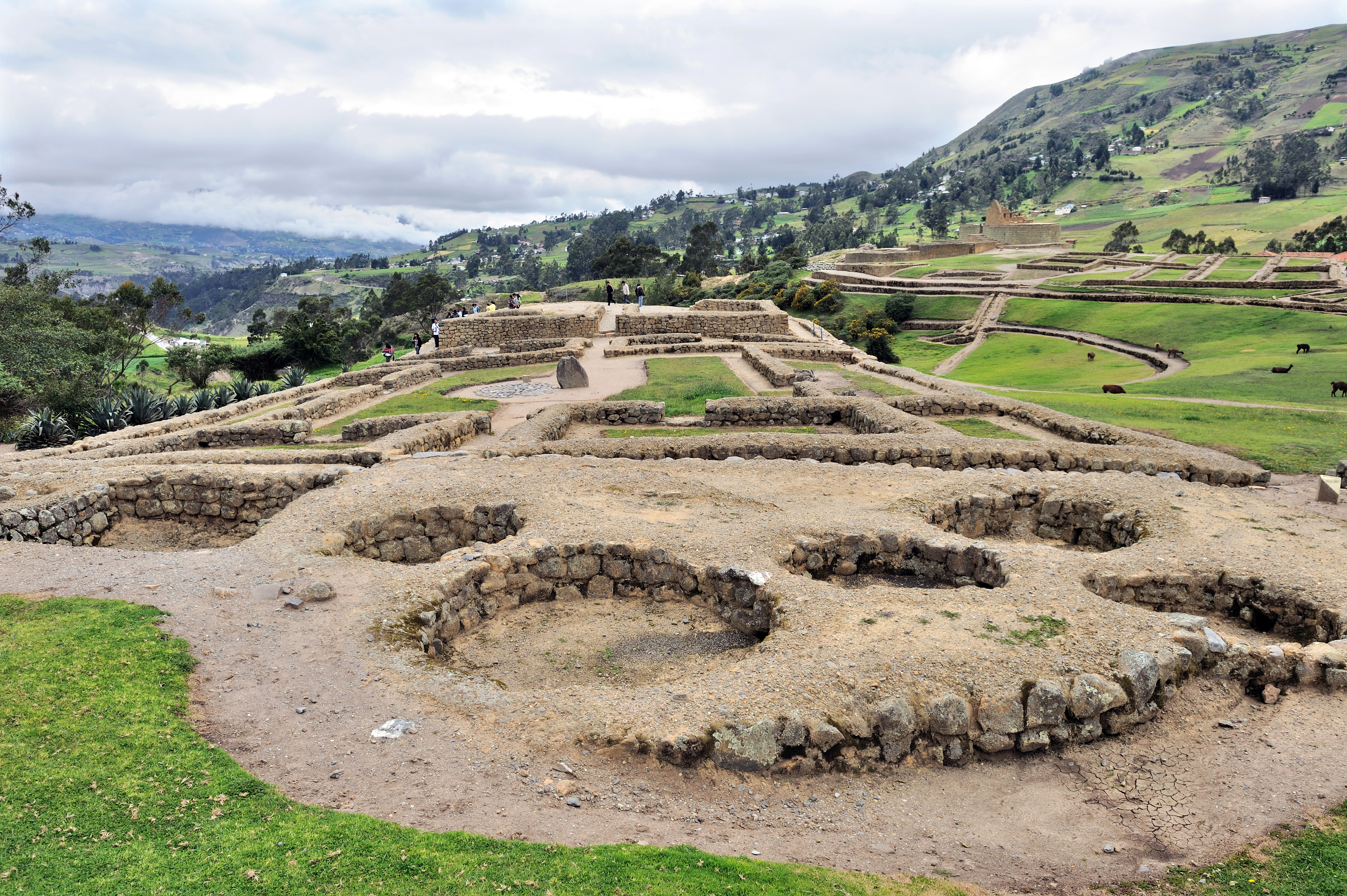
After the Incan conquest, the Incas settled in the Cañari capital of Ingapirca, which became an important regional center. At the back can be seen the Temple of the Sun of the Incan period.

=== Inca Conquest ===
The Inca triumph over the Paltas was complete because they surrendered themselves and were incorporated into the Inca "empire". Notwithstanding such docility, Túpac Yupanqui took some thousands of them and sent them far from their territories to the remote provinces of Collao, and settled the land of the Paltas with mitimaes from other provinces. The fortresses, which had been prepared on the highlands of Saraguro, did not help them at all because the presence of Inca troops in the valley made them know that all resistance would be useless.

Having vanquished and subjugated the Paltas, Túpac Yupanqui continued the conquest of the Cañari. The Cañari were numerous and had been for much time before silently preparing for the defense of their lands and their independence: they had celebrated a union of all the leaders and elected Dumma as chief and had, moreover, a considerable army. Túpac Yupanqui thought that he should not lose time or give the Cañari space to fortify more: he thus rushed his troops and attacked the enemies, expecting to defeat them by surprise; but he was mistaken because the Cañari were aware of the attack and had occupied all the difficult passes. The battle was, thus, intense and the Inca retreated hastily toward Saraguro, seeing that the defeat of tribes as astute as they were bellicose was not so easy as he had imagined.

The defeat of the Inca inspired new bravery in the Cañari and, combining valor with strategy, they communicated secretly with the Paltas, inciting them to rebel against the Inca: such a risky enterprise unnerved the Paltas and, after consulting with their wisemen what to do, they resolved to tell Túpac Yupanqui of the Cañari plans. The proud Túpac Yupanqui was offended and resolved not to return to Cuzco without first subjugating the Cañari. He sent for reinforcements from all of the Inca "empire"; and while they were arriving, he constructed a fortification along the border between the Paltas and the Cañari.

Knowing of these Inca preparations and seeing the works or preparations for war that had begun, morale began to weaken, and the strength with which the first assault was resisted was exchanged with discouragement. They began to look for a peaceful solution and, at last, sent messengers to the Inca, charged with offering to submit to his "empire". The Cañari were famous for being fickle. As such, the Inca did not believe them at first, only after taking measures for his security and demanding, as one of those measures, that Dumma and other leaders send their own children as hostages, did he believe it. Túpac Yupanqui, thus assured, began to travel toward the province of Azuay; but before entering it personally, he sent his most trusted official to arrange for dignified accommodations and to determine the resolve of the Cañari and discover any plans for treachery.

The Cañari received the envoy of the Inca with grand celebration, and in a very short time constructed a palace that would house their new lord; and when he appeared, finally, on their land, they came out to encounter him, giving public and solemn manifestations of sincere respect and of celebration. The Cañaris were loosely assimilated into the vast empire, allowed to manage their own affairs but adopting a new language.

Túpac Yupanqui stayed a long time in the province of Azuay, taking away a considerable number of its native inhabitants and moving them to Cuzco; he constructed bridges on the rivers and ordered the construction of various buildings, as many religious as non-religious, wanting to earn the affection of the Cañari and have them as subjects. Túpac Yupanqui beautified the city of Tumebamba where his son Huayna Capac was born.

He gave the order to construct two fortresses: one in Achupallas, and another in Pumallacta. He built in the roughest location of the mountain chain a residence for the convenience of his army and subjugation, without any difficulty, of the Quillacos, who lived in the valley of Guasunos and Alausí. So ended the conquest of the Cañari and the incorporation of their territory in the Inca "empire".

=== Inca Civil War ===
During the civil war between Huáscar and Atahuallpa, the sons of Huayna Cápac, the Cañari chose to support Huáscar, despite being positioned in the northern area inherited by the son and heir Atahuallpa. Initially, Huáscar's generals Atoc and Hango were successful, defeating Atahuallpa's army and capturing many of his soldiers, including seizure of the large cities Cajamarca and Tumebamba.

Aided by his father's loyal generals, Atahuallpa managed to rout the Huáscaran army in the battles of Mullihambato and Chimborazo. This forced the interlopers back to the south. He captured and executed Huáscar's generals and executed the Cañari supporters once he reached Tumebamba. The Cañari were punished heavily, leaving only 12 thousand of their original population of 50 thousand.

=== Spanish conquest ===
Cañari chieftains in the Corpus Christi procession in Cusco.

When Francisco Pizarro arrived at Tumbes, he received news that the Cañari were against the government of Atahuallpa. The Cañari hoped the Spanish people would liberate them from the Incas, and Pizarro included the Cañari among his troops to face Atahuallpa and Inca resistance.

In 1536, Cañari and Spanish soldiers defeated the Inca in the battle of Sacsayhuamán. The Cañari continued to be important under Spanish rule, often far from their ancestral home. After Pizarro was killed in 1541, Cañari leader Francisco Chilche claimed to be the overlord (cacique) of much of the land of the Incan Quispiguanca estate in the Sacred Valley near Cuzco. He fended off Indian rivals and the claims of Spaniards who sought land in the valley. As allies of the Spanish during the overthrow of the Inca Empire the Cañari had legal standing with the Spanish. Chilche continued to be important into the 1570s when he recruited 500 Indian soldiers to fight with the Spanish in their war against the last Inca, Tupac Amaru.

== Territory ==
The Cañari were a group or confederacy of united tribes who formed a people; they inhabited the area from the limits of Azuay to Saraguro, from the Gualaquiza mountains to the Narajal beaches and the coasts of the Jambelí canal. Within the Cañari territory, the most important areas were Cañaribamba, Cojitambo, Chobshi, Shabalula, Molleturo, Coyoctor, Culebrillas, Yacubiñay, Guapondelig and Hatun Cañar. After the Inca Conquest, the newcomers renamed the last two settlements as Tumebamba and Ingapirca, respectively. Located in the present-day provinces of Azuay, Cañar, and El Oro in what is modern Ecuador, the ruins and archeological remains of Cañari and Inca culture survive in many of those locations.

Túpac Yupanqui renamed Guapondelig as Tumebamba. He had the palace of Pumapungo constructed, from which he governed the northern sector of the Inca empire. Years later, Huayna Cápac returned to the north of the empire to put down the rebellion of the northern tribes,

The largest known ruins of the Cañari-Inca confederation are:

- Ingapirca (Cañar Province)
- Pumapungo (Azuay Province)
- Chobshi (Azuay Province)
- Yacubiñay (El Oro Province)

Of these four, Ingapirca is the best known. Pumapungo is not well known, although it is located in the centre of the city of Cuenca, behind the Pumapungo Museum. Chobshi and Yacubiñay have not been studied intensively or excavated by professional archeologists.

== Culture ==
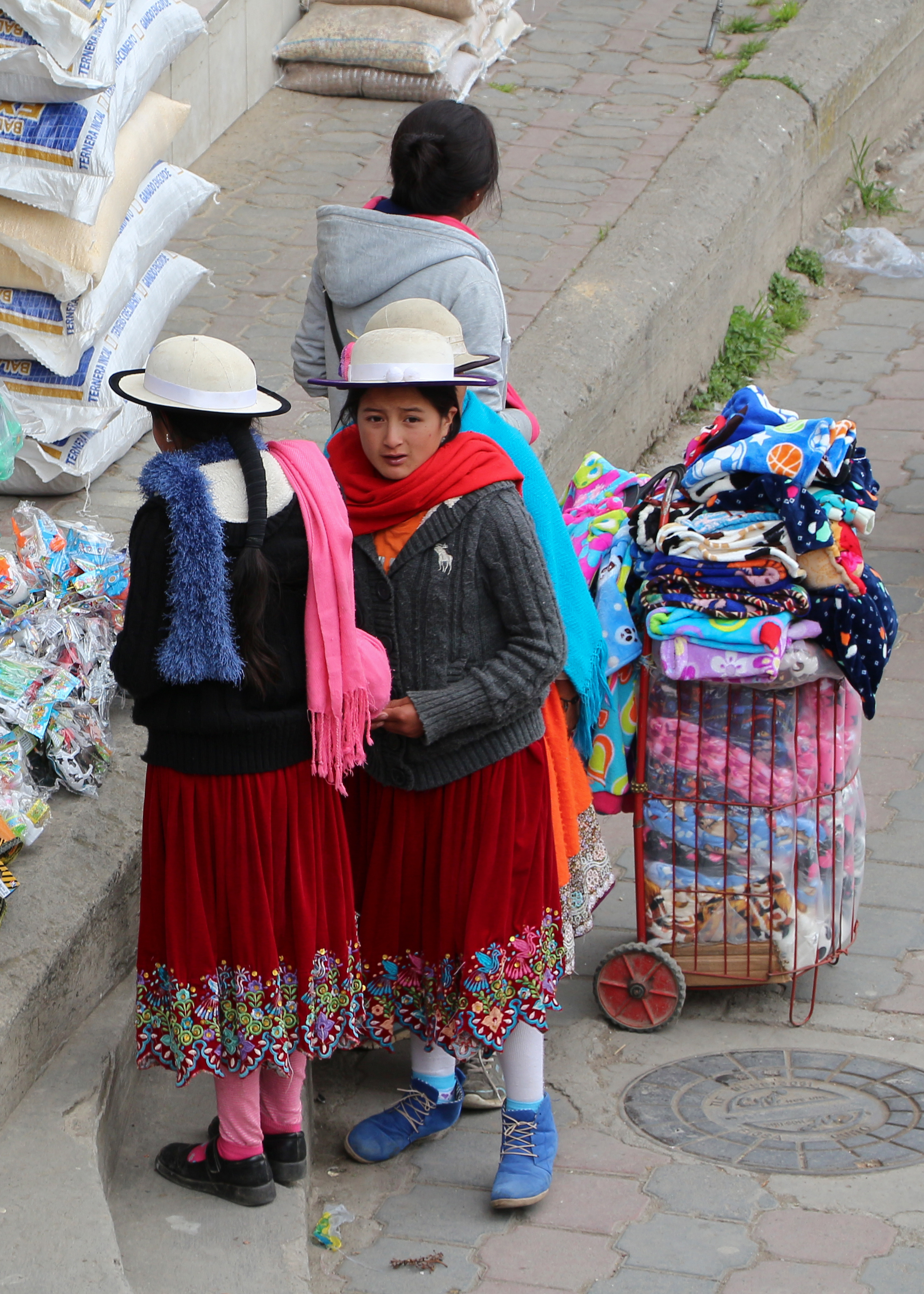
Young women wearing the typical hat

The Cañari people are believed to have had a federative monarchy. Each leader had hegemony over their individual tribe; however, in certain crises, such as natural disasters or wars, the confederacy of tribes would unite and choose a single leader.

Some tribes had matriarchal societies or kinship systems. When the Inca married into these powerful families, they used marriage to gain de facto power over certain Cañari bands.

The Cañari used a lunar calendar and built temples in circular or moon-like shapes. At Ingapirca, examples of round Cañari buildings can be seen juxtaposed against the rectangular Inca buildings. The site also has stone "calendars". These devices are stones with holes drilled in them in various positions at various angles. The holes are filled with water to reflect celestial bodies. Each one reflects at different times, giving dates.

As many as ten Cañari dialects may have survived into the 21st century, but surviving speakers are few and far between. Researchers have been able to discover little information about the languages or how to speak them. Most indigenous people in Ecuador claim to speak Kichwa or Spanish.

=== Language ===
The Cañari language is believed to be practically extinct.

During the Inca conquest, the Cañari learned Quechua (Kichwa). This language of the conquering people was enriched with many vernacular words absorbed by use of the conquered people. For instance, the names of certain objects or places such as rivers, mountains, etc., have been absorbed without a synonym sense in Quechua.

During Spanish colonialism, missionaries worked to translate a catechism into Cañari, in order to evangelize to this population. However, no copy of this manuscript survives. With the passage of time, the mission priests found evangelism in the language of each people to be very difficult. The Spanish rulers ordered the Cañaris to learn Kichwa, which contributed to the disuse of Cañari. The lack of documentation has resulted in a death of knowledge about this language.

=== Accent ===
The Cuenca accent is theorized to be the relic of the original Cañari language. Its distribution is in the footprint of the original Cañari settlements, and is more prevalent in rural communities, where the distinctive pronunciation is stronger. The contrast of thinking that its origin come from the Quechua dialect is that the presence does not extend past the provinces of Cañar and Azuay, while the Kichwa is present outside these. The accent of Cuenca also has its presence in northwestern Argentina, and theory suggest that it could have originated from mitimaes brought by the Incas in the wars of expansion. The accent 'cantadito' is also present in places of Bolivia.

== Notable people ==
- Yaku Pérez Guartambel, indigenous rights activist and presidential candidate in the 2021 Ecuadorian general election
