= Cojitambo =

Place in Ecuador

Coordinates: 2°45′36″S 78°53′20″W

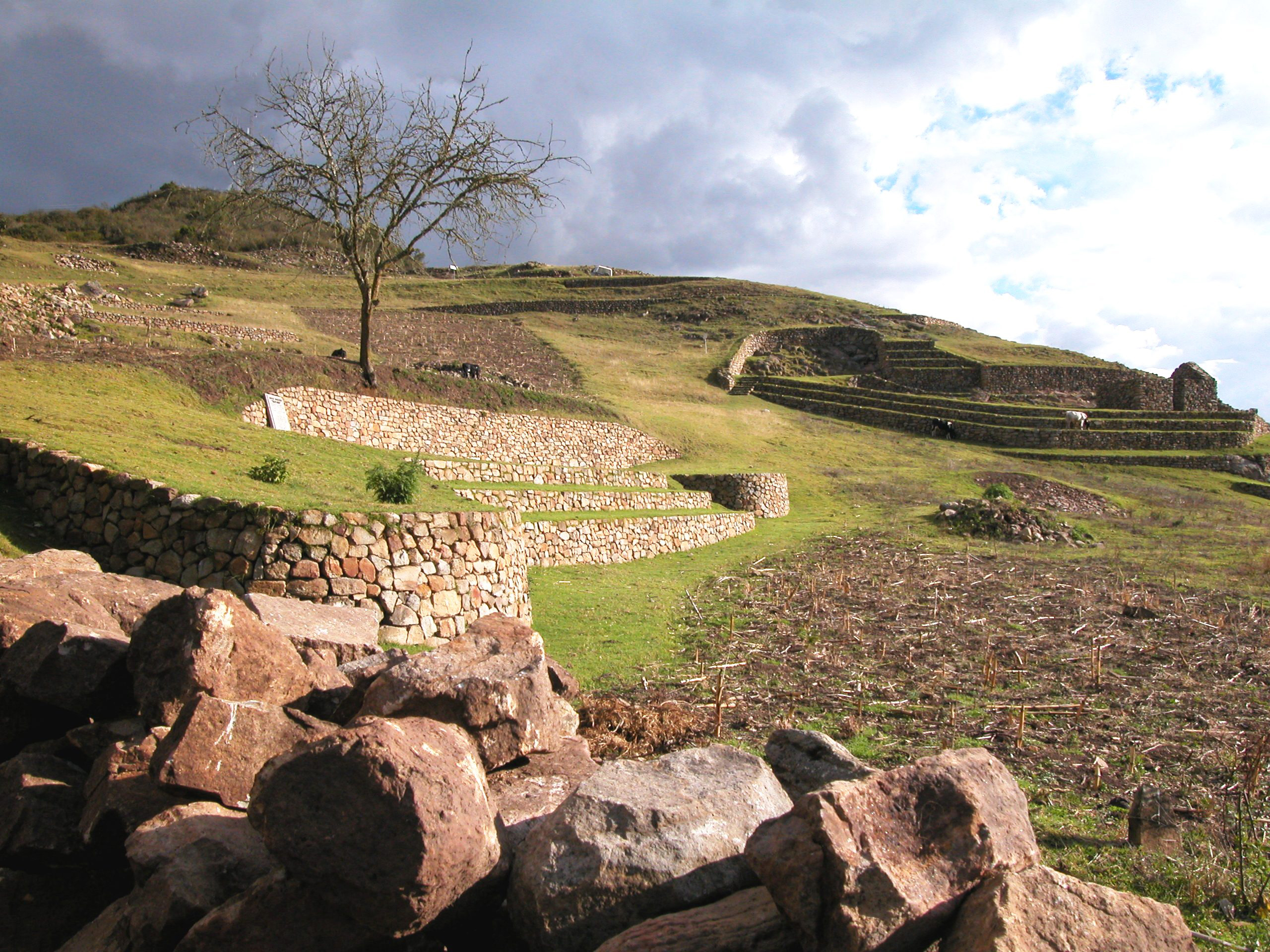
The ruins of Cojitambo.

Cojitambo is an Inca and pre-Inca archaeological ruin, a popular rock climbing site, and a small village west of Azogues, capital of Canar province of Ecuador.

The name is said by the Ecuadorian Ministry of Tourism to derive from the Quechua language curi tambo, or Inn of Gold (although no gold has been found at the site).

== Location and description ==
The Cojitambo archaeological site is at an elevation of 3,020 metres (9,910 ft) above sea level. Azogues is 6 kilometres (3.7 mi) northeast. The straight-line distance northeast from the city of Cuenca is 18 kilometres (11 mi).

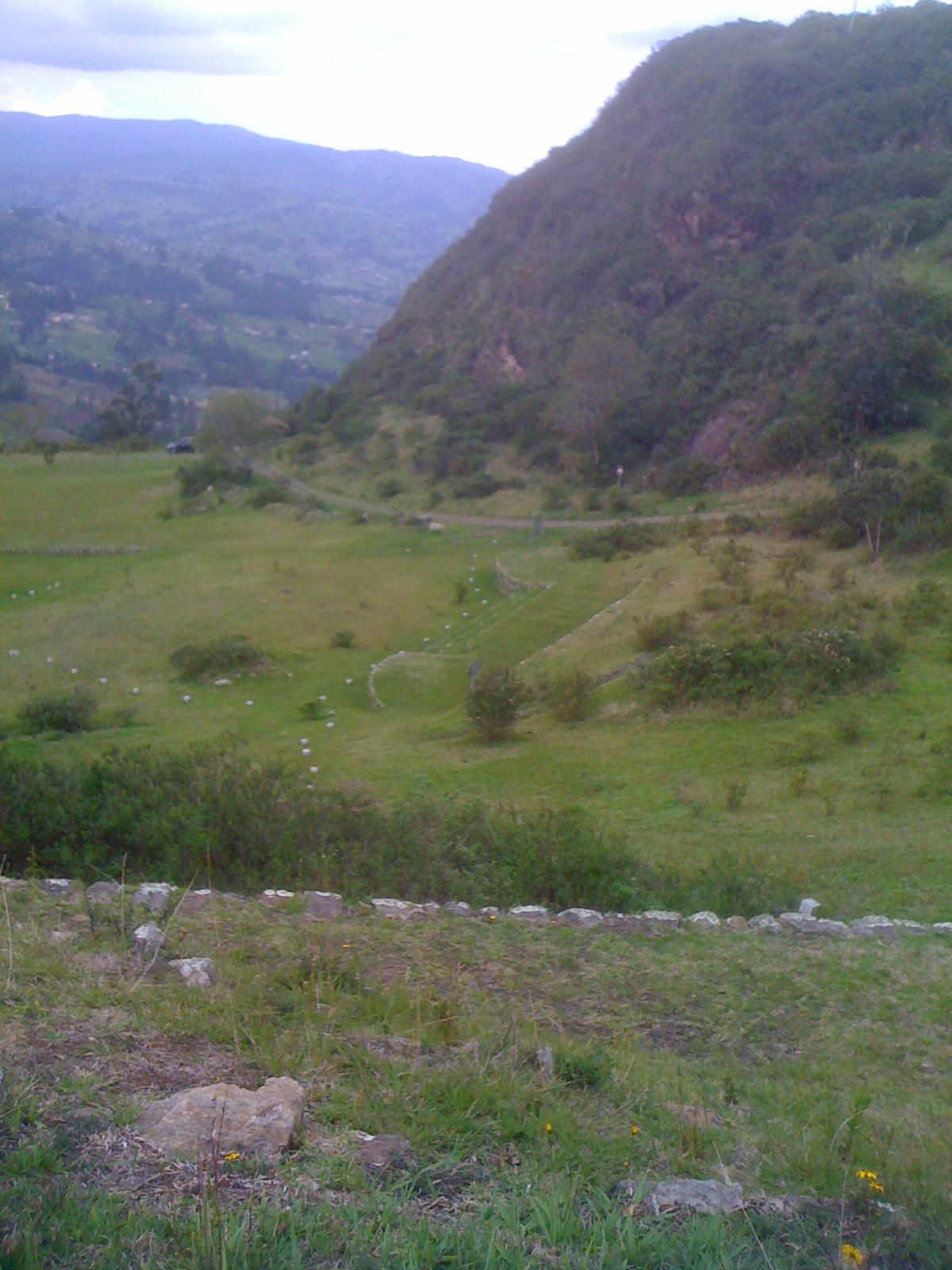
Stage-like terrace at Cojitambo archaeological site, Canar province, Ecuador.

The sheer eastern face of Cojitambo rock rises 150 metres (490 ft) from the outskirts of the village of Cojitambo. The cliffs run for about 500 metres (1,600 ft) in a north-south direction. The dome-shaped rock is Ecuador's most popular site for rock climbing with more than 100 routes identified. The climbing routes are rated from easy to 5.14 (very difficult).

The Cojitambo archaeological sits on a small flattened area on top of the cliffs. The terrain is less steep in the north and west and a road leads to the summit and ruins.

== Background ==
Archaeologists have uncovered evidence that the site of Cojitambo was occupied from 500 BCE onward. It was probably both a military and religious site of the Cañari people long before the arrival of the Incas.

The Incas began their conquest of Ecuador under the emperor Pachacuti Inca Yupanqui (ruled c. 1438–1471) about 1450. Prior to the Inca invasion the Cañari probably consisted of a number of related, but politically independent, chiefdoms. They united to resist the Incas, but succumbed about 1460 after a vigorous struggle. Cojitambo was built in part to suppress the Cañari and to further the conquest of peoples further north. After their conquest the Incas instituted a major building program to integrate the Cañari into their empire. This included construction of the Inca royal road which stretched the length of the Inca Empire and passed through Cojitambo. Cojitambo served religious and ceremonial purposes.

The Incas also quarried building stones at Cojitambo. They transported blocks of andesite to their northern capital of Tomebamba, modern day Cuenca.
