= Zhuya, Cañar =

Coordinates: 2°32′13″S 79°2′2″W

Zhuya is a village and community in Cañar Province, Ecuador. Its population is about 500 people. Its people are known as Zhuyan (Zhuyanos).Their first language is Spanish, second language Kichwa and some young people speak some English. An organization of 29 members called la cooperativa San Andres de Zhuya is the local authority in the county.

== Neighbouring villages ==
Zhuya is surrounded by small villages: Malal, Her, Chuchucan, Purubin, and Gaza. These neighbouring villages get the government benefits in Zhuya, Gualleturo or the main city of Cañar.

In 2012, the representatives of Zhuya, together with the neighboring communities, opposed the construction of Cañari People Association Solid Waste Treatment Center in Curiurcu.
