= Biblián Canton =

Biblián Canton Ecuador Biblián Ecuador Ecuador Biblián
- Canton
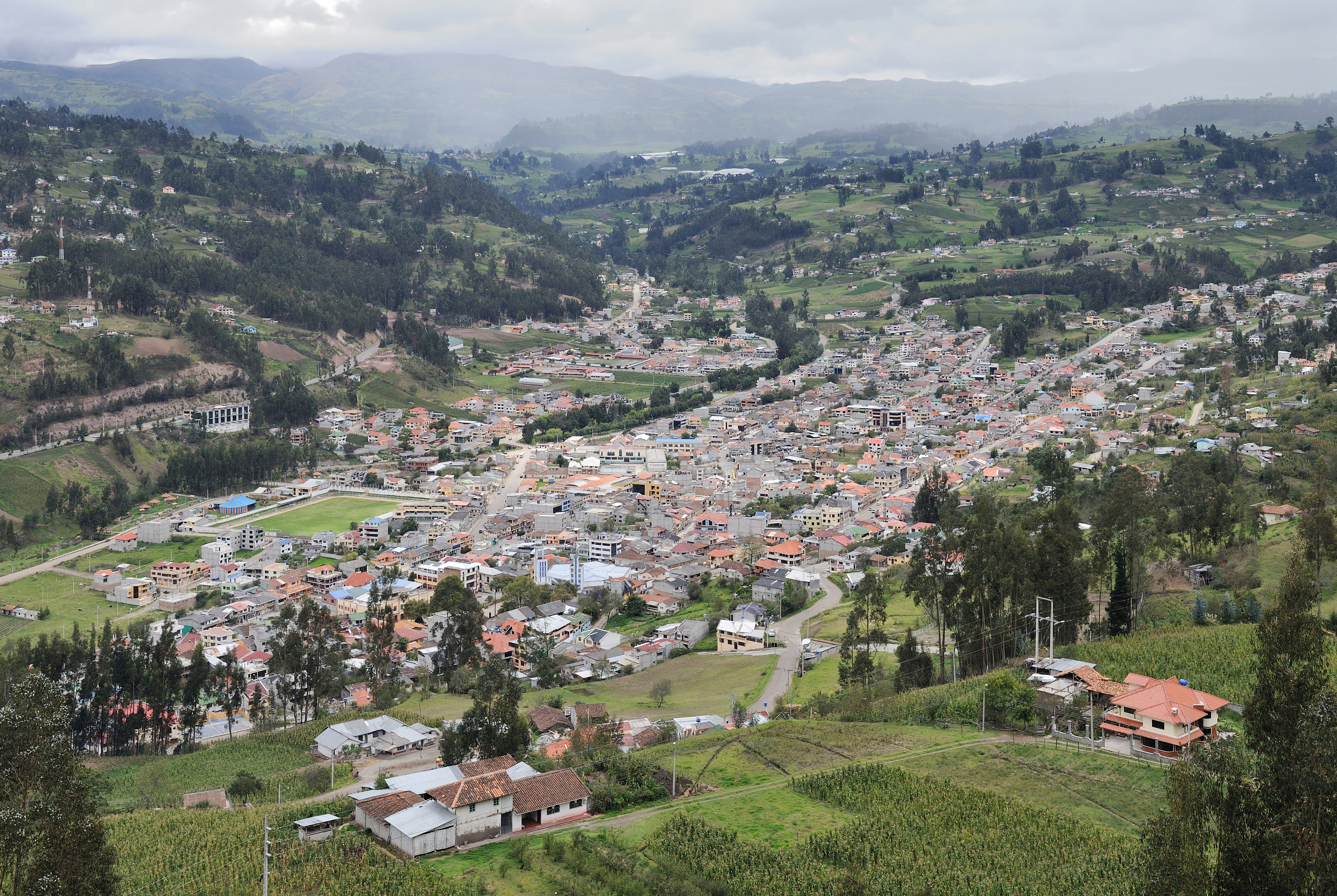
- Biblián

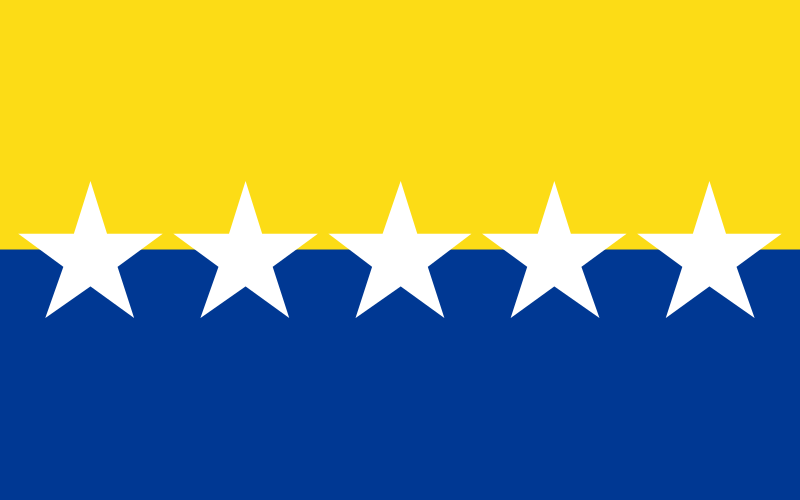
- Flag
- Nickname: Biblián Ecuador Canton
- Location of Cañar Province in Ecuador.

- Biblián Canton in Cañar Province
- Coordinates: 2.71°S 78.88°W
- Country: Ecuador
- Province: Cañar Province
- Time zone: UTC-5 (ECT)

Biblián Canton Ecuador is a canton of Ecuador, located in the Cañar Province. Its capital is the town of Biblián. Its population at the 2010 census was 20,500. Population has remained unchanged for the past two decades. Most of its original inhabitants have immigrated to the United States and Spain, while internal immigration from other cities in the province has helped keep the population at about 20,000 since the 1980s

== Points of interest ==
- El Santuario de la Virgen del Rocío

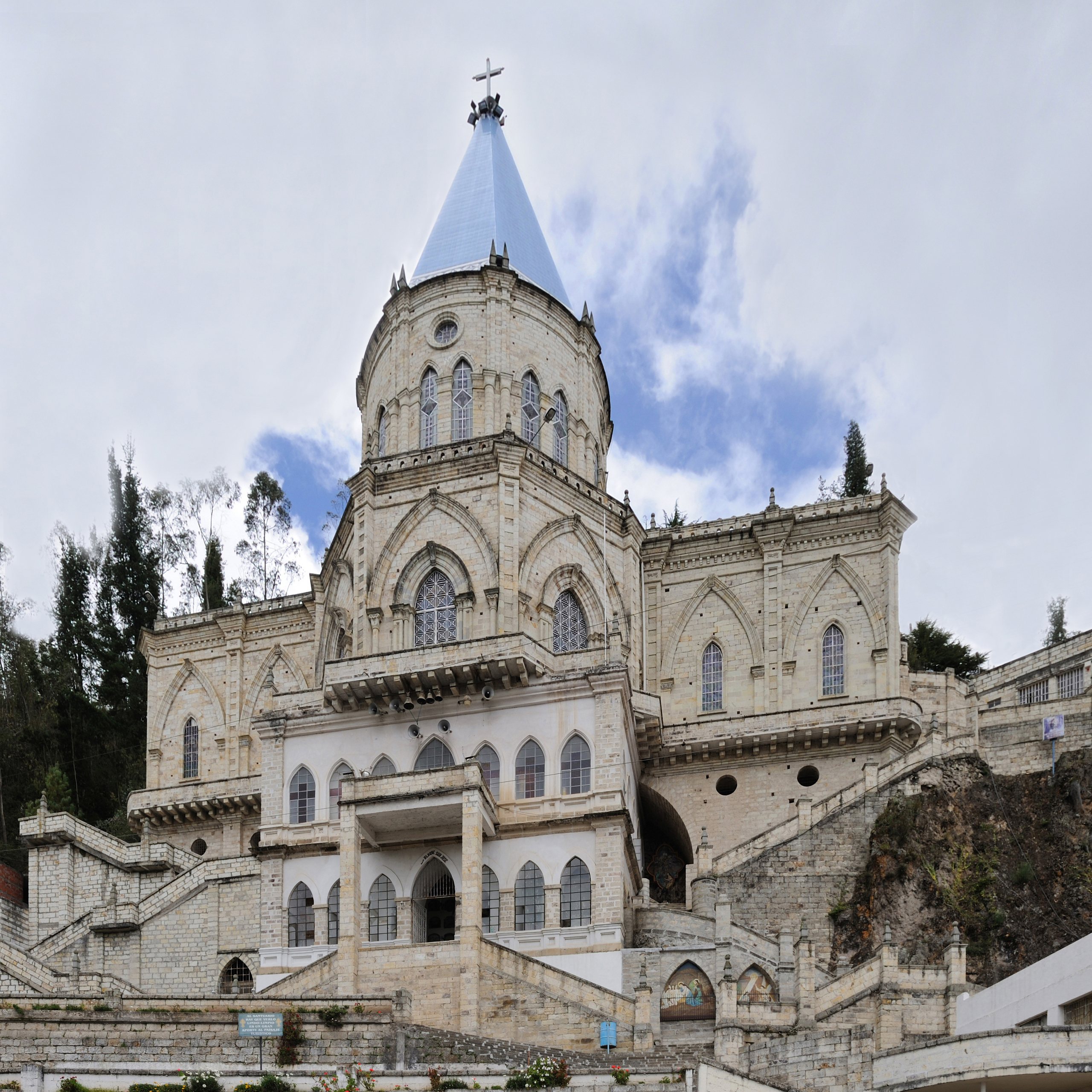
El Santuario de la Virgen del Rocío

== Climate ==
Climate data for Biblián, elevation 2,640 m (8,660 ft), (1986–1995)
Month	Jan	Feb	Mar	Apr	May	Jun	Jul	Aug	Sep	Oct	Nov	Dec	Year
Mean daily maximum °C (°F)	20.8 (69.4)	20.7 (69.3)	20.5 (68.9)	20.3 (68.5)	19.9 (67.8)	17.7 (63.9)	17.6 (63.7)	17.7 (63.9)	19.3 (66.7)	20.4 (68.7)	21.2 (70.2)	21.5 (70.7)	19.8 (67.6)
Daily mean °C (°F)	15.1 (59.2)	15.0 (59.0)	14.8 (58.6)	15.0 (59.0)	14.6 (58.3)	13.8 (56.8)	12.8 (55.0)	13.1 (55.6)	14.0 (57.2)	14.5 (58.1)	15.0 (59.0)	15.4 (59.7)	14.4 (58.0)
Mean daily minimum °C (°F)	9.4 (48.9)	9.5 (49.1)	9.6 (49.3)	9.7 (49.5)	9.2 (48.6)	8.7 (47.7)	7.7 (45.9)	7.3 (45.1)	8.1 (46.6)	8.6 (47.5)	8.6 (47.5)	8.6 (47.5)	8.7 (47.8)
Average precipitation mm (inches)	61.7 (2.43)	104.2 (4.10)	121.0 (4.76)	115.6 (4.55)	72.4 (2.85)	44.8 (1.76)	47.2 (1.86)	33.5 (1.32)	42.4 (1.67)	80.7 (3.18)	104.9 (4.13)	68.2 (2.69)	896.6 (35.3)
Average relative humidity (%)	77.4	79.7	78.9	78.6	78.0	78.3	76.9	77.2	76.5	77.4	75.1	73.1	77.3
Source: Instituto Nacional de Meteorología e Hidrología
