= Azogues Canton =

- Canton
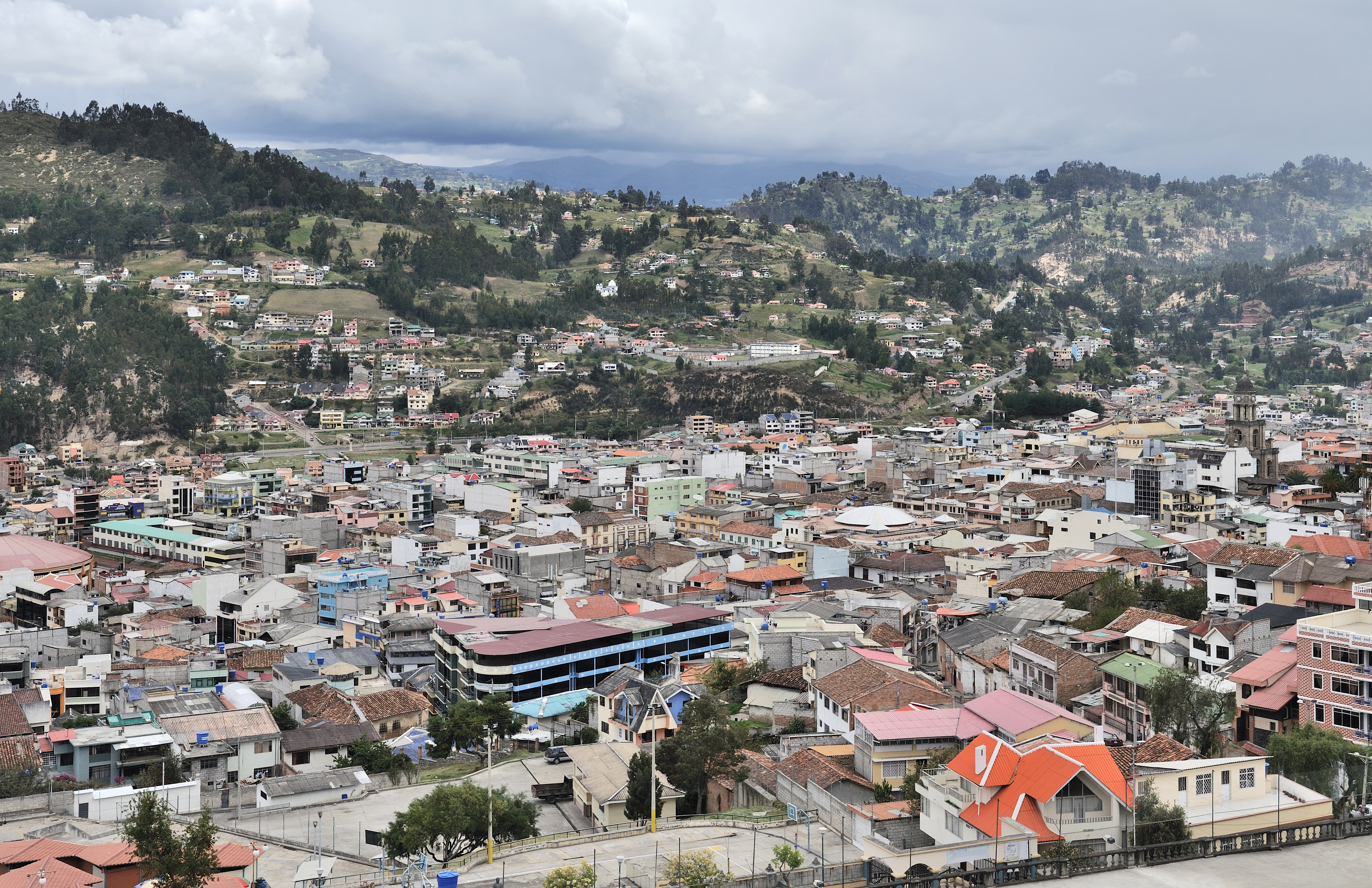

- Location of Cañar Province in Ecuador.

- Azogues Canton in Cañar Province
- Coordinates: 2°44′S 78°50′W
- Country: Ecuador
- Province: Cañar Province

Area
  - Total: 953.2 km^{2} (368.0 sq mi)
- Elevation: 3,000 m (9,800 ft)

Population (2022 census)
  - Total: 74,515
  - Density: 78.17/km^{2} (202.5/sq mi)
- Time zone: UTC-5 (ECT)

Azogues Canton, is an administrative district in the province of Caňar. Its capital town is Azogues, which is also the capital of the province.
