= Suscal Canton =

- Canton
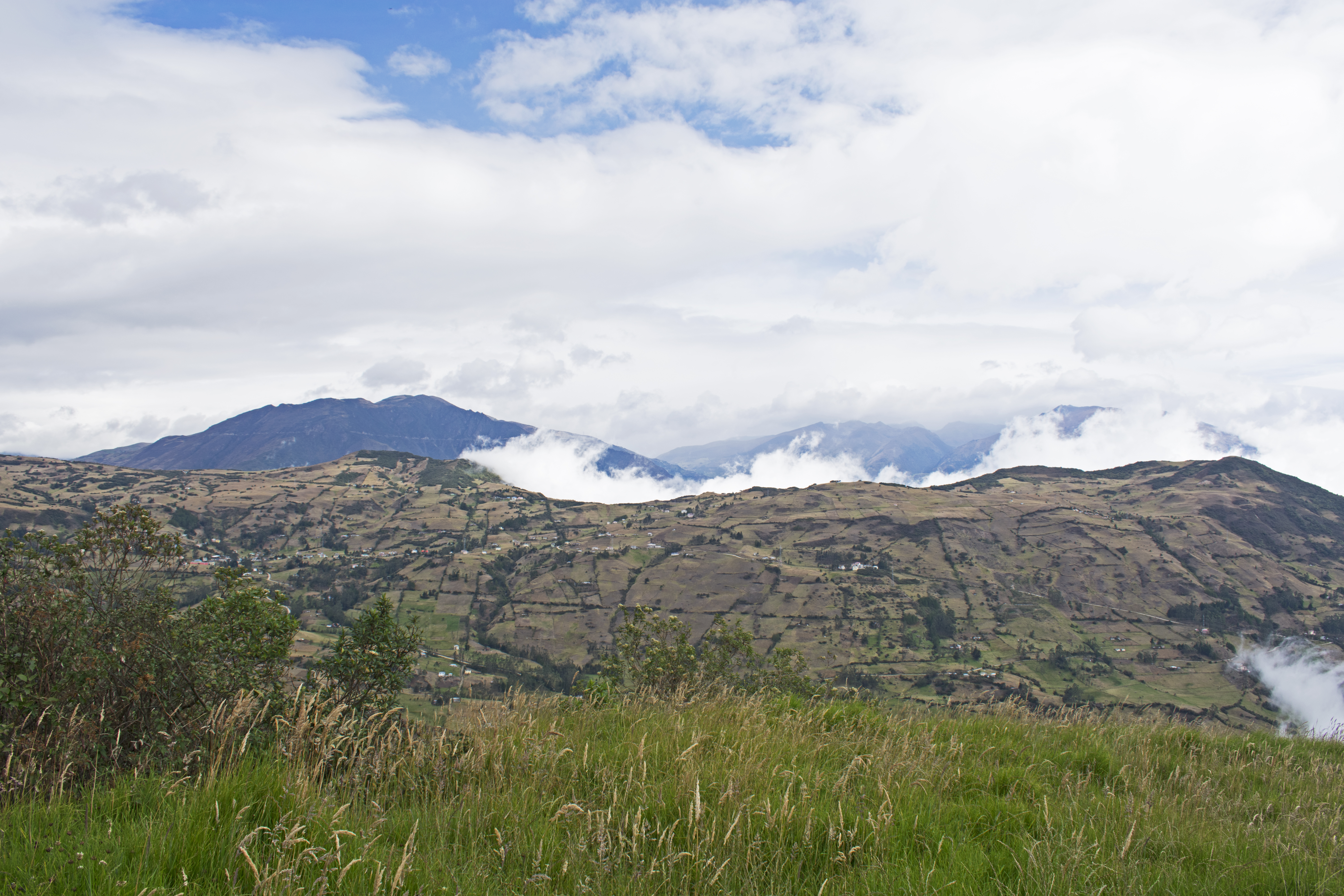
- Hills southeast of Suscal

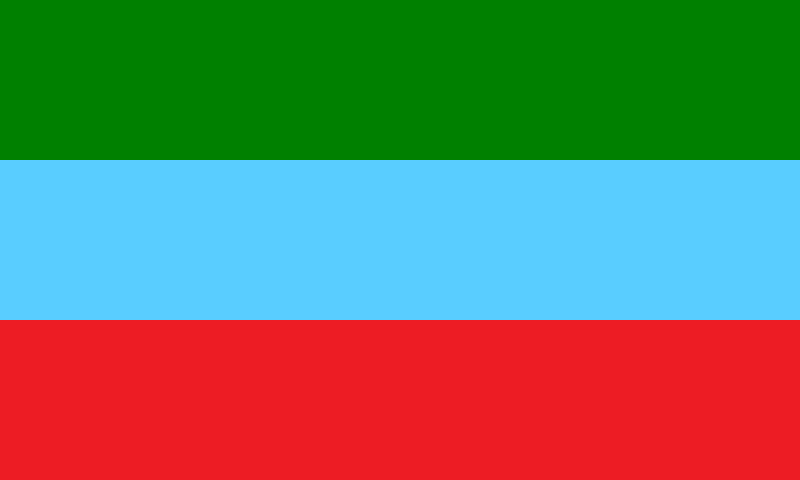
- Flag

- Location of Cañar Province in Ecuador.

- Suscal Canton in Cañar Province
- Coordinates: 2.4364°S 79.0522°W
- Country: Ecuador
- Province: Cañar Province
- Time zone: UTC-5 (ECT)

Suscal Canton is a canton of Ecuador, located in the Cañar Province. Its capital is the town of Suscal. Its population at the 2001 census was 4,419.
