= Santuario de la Virgen de la Nube =

- Santuario de la Virgen de la Nube

The Santuario de la Virgen de la Nube, better known as the Franciscan Sanctuary Our Lady of the Cloud, is a church of the Roman Catholic Diocese of Azogues, located in the eastern part of the Ecuadorian city of Azogues, capital of the province of Cañar. It was built between 1912 and 1954. It is a church of singular and beautiful construction that dates from the Republican era, its entire structure as well as its stairways were made with carved stone from the Abuga hill. The High Altar of the sanctuary is entirely carved in fine wood, covered with gold leaf. In the central part of it is the image of the Virgin of the Cloud.

== History ==
The invocation of the Blessed Virgin of the Cloud originated in the city of Quito in the year 1696, around a manifestation of the Virgin Mary, whose image was formed (according to testimonies) from the clouds of heaven.

The image that is currently venerated in her Sanctuary was carved by the Cuencan artist Don Daniel Alvarado Bermeo in 1899.

The Sanctuary was built on the basis of mingas, according to the chronicles written by Fr. José María Idígoras, up to almost 200 people per minga gathered. After the years this fraternity was elevated to guardianship on September 17, 1919.

To increase the devotion of our Lady of the Cloud, the CHORUS of the Virgin, made up of 30 families each, were created. According to the chronicles, in 1927 there were 21 choirs.

On October 24, 1965, the community of Franciscan Fathers of Azogues requested the decree of canonization of the 'Virgin of the Cloud'. The act in which the Catholic Church allows public worship and where a liturgical feast is assigned in honor of the image as well as its power of intercession before God took place on January 1, 1967.

On July 27, 1971, half of the temple was seriously affected by a deadly earthquake that had its epicenter in the south-east of Ecuador, whose effects were felt strong in much of northwestern South America, from which a large wall collapsed. that served as protection for the sanctuary and from which said retaining wall had to be restored.

== Legend ==
The history of this devotion to the Virgin comes from the colony, when in Quito Bishop Sancho de Andrade y Figueroa (1696) fell ill and before the prayers that the faithful made for his healing, a woman appeared in the sky, between Guápulo and Quinche. image of the Virgin Mary resting on a white cloud.

Since then, the Catholic people of Ecuador pay their tribute of love to Mary, with the invocation of Virgen de la Nube. This tribute is fulfilled at the beginning of the year, every first of January thousands of believers from the country and abroad arrive in the city of Azogues to venerate and participate in all the religious acts prepared by the Franciscan Friars, among which the procession for the main streets of the city, which, in addition to being an act of faith, has become a tourist attraction.

=== Our Lady of the Cloud Monument ===
The Nuestra Señora de la Nube Monument, or better called Virgen de La Nube in El Abuga, is a religious monument that has the figure of the Virgin Mary, holding the baby Jesus in her arms.

== Apostolate ==
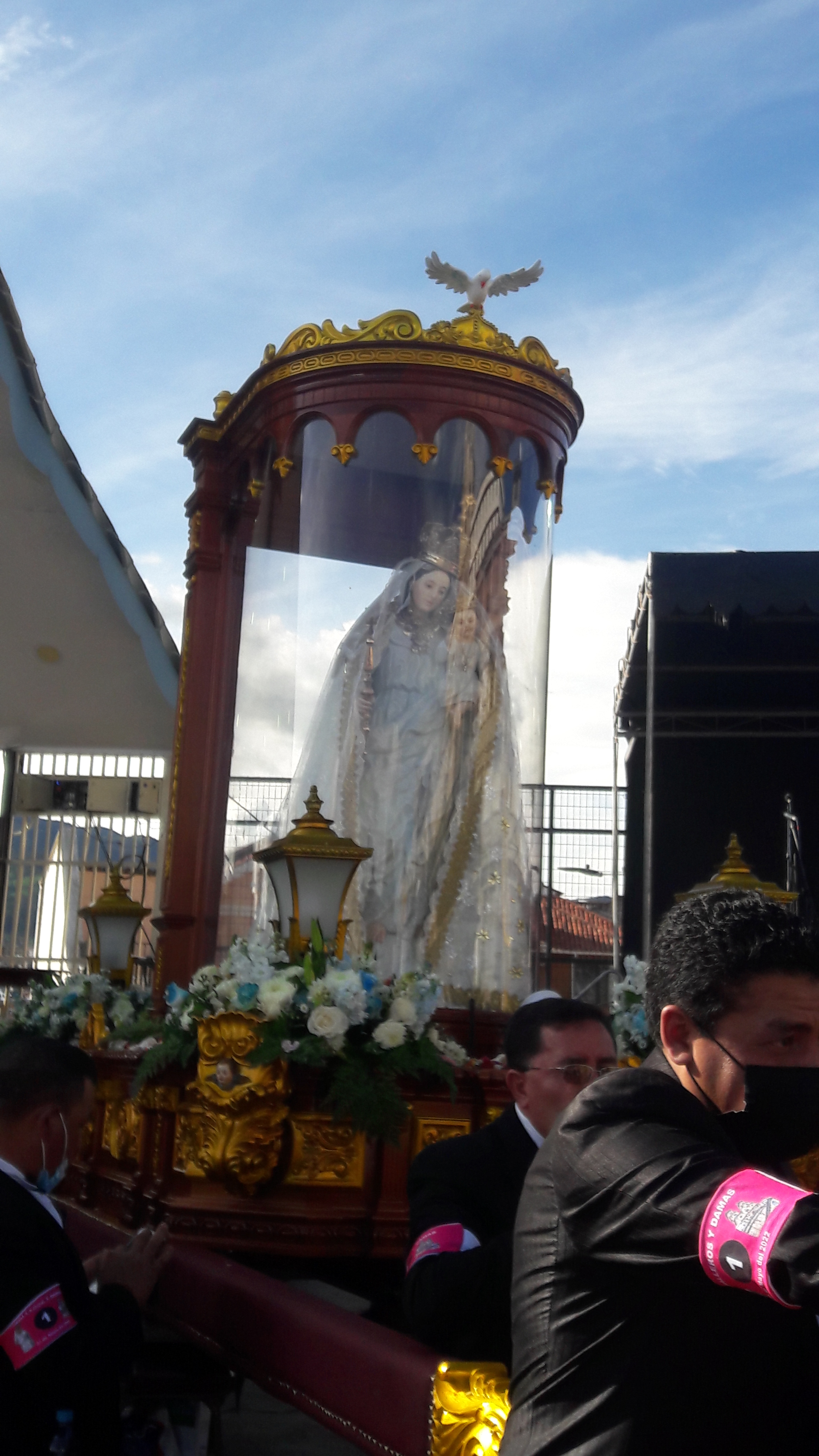
The Virgin of the Cloud at the time of the procession on May 31, 2022

The traditional Festival of the Virgen de la Nube is celebrated on January 1 and May 31 of each year. There is a procession in her honor. The pilgrimages are attended by approximately 40,000 people.

On January 1, the feast day of the Virgen de la Nube each year, groups of priests from all the convents come to offer help to the religious of that fraternity to satisfy the spiritual demands of the innumerable caravans of pilgrims who come to pay a tribute of love to the Virgin of the Cloud.

== Gallery ==
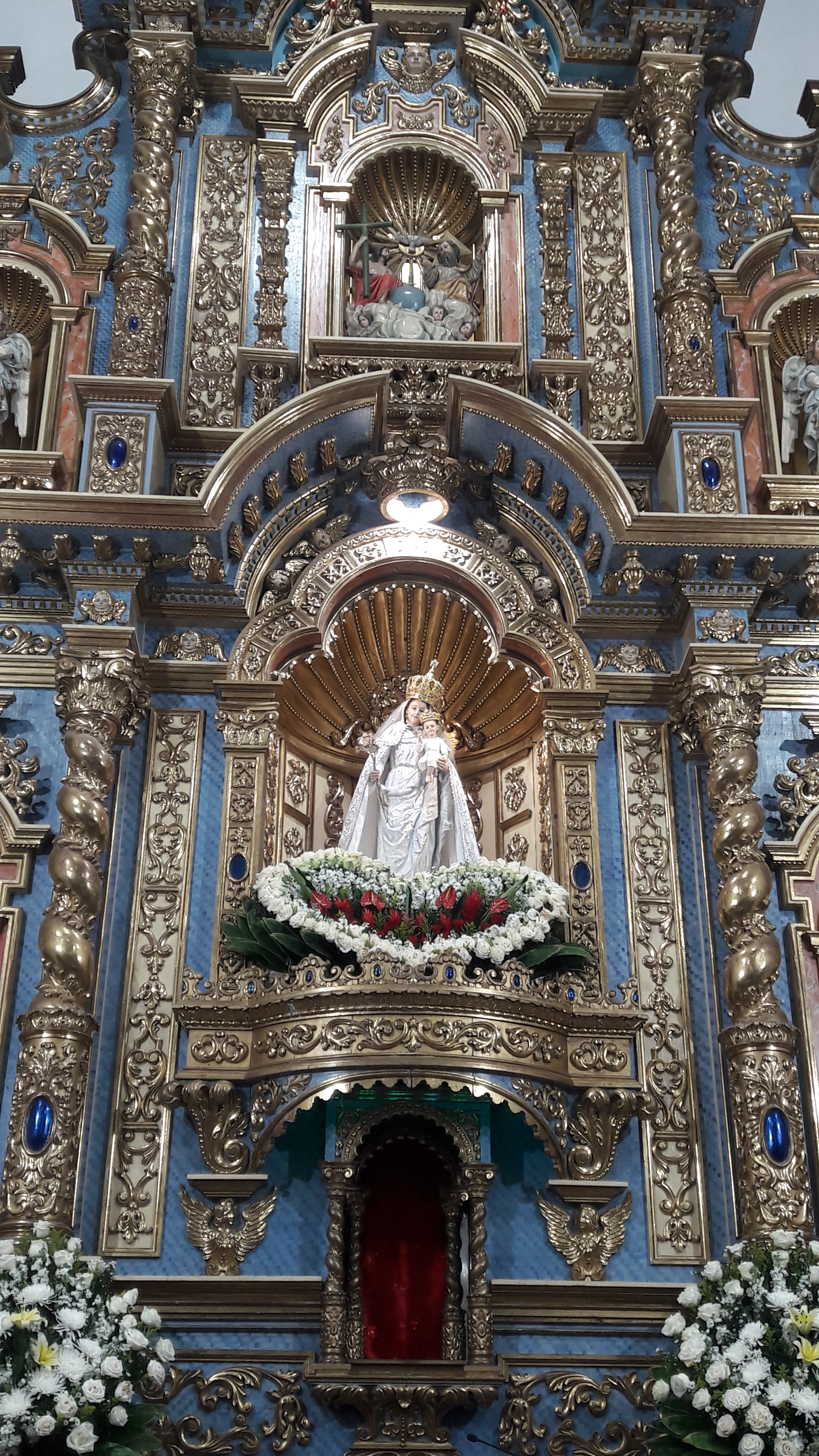
The Virgin of the Cloud in the Altar

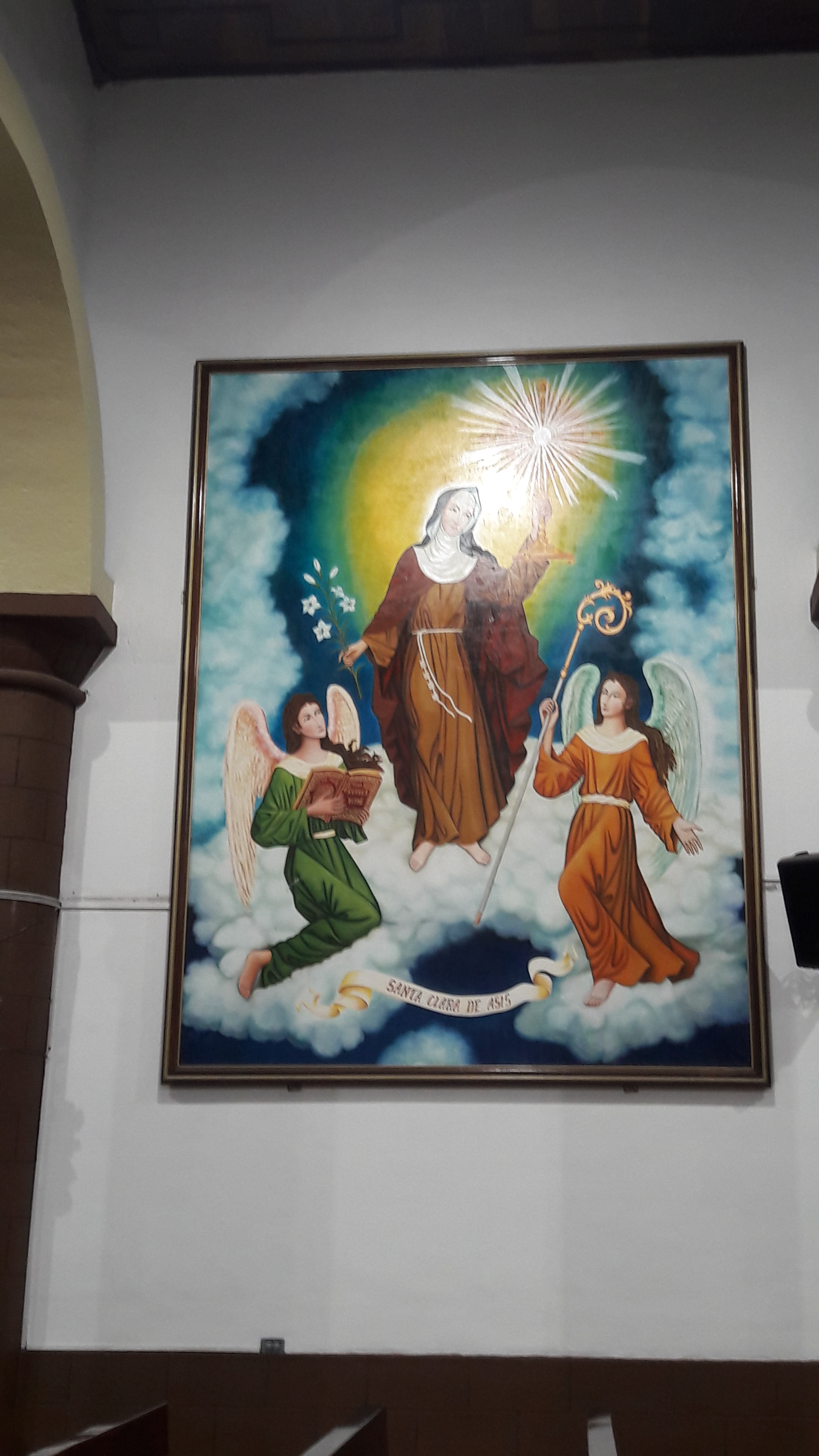
Santa Clara of Assisi

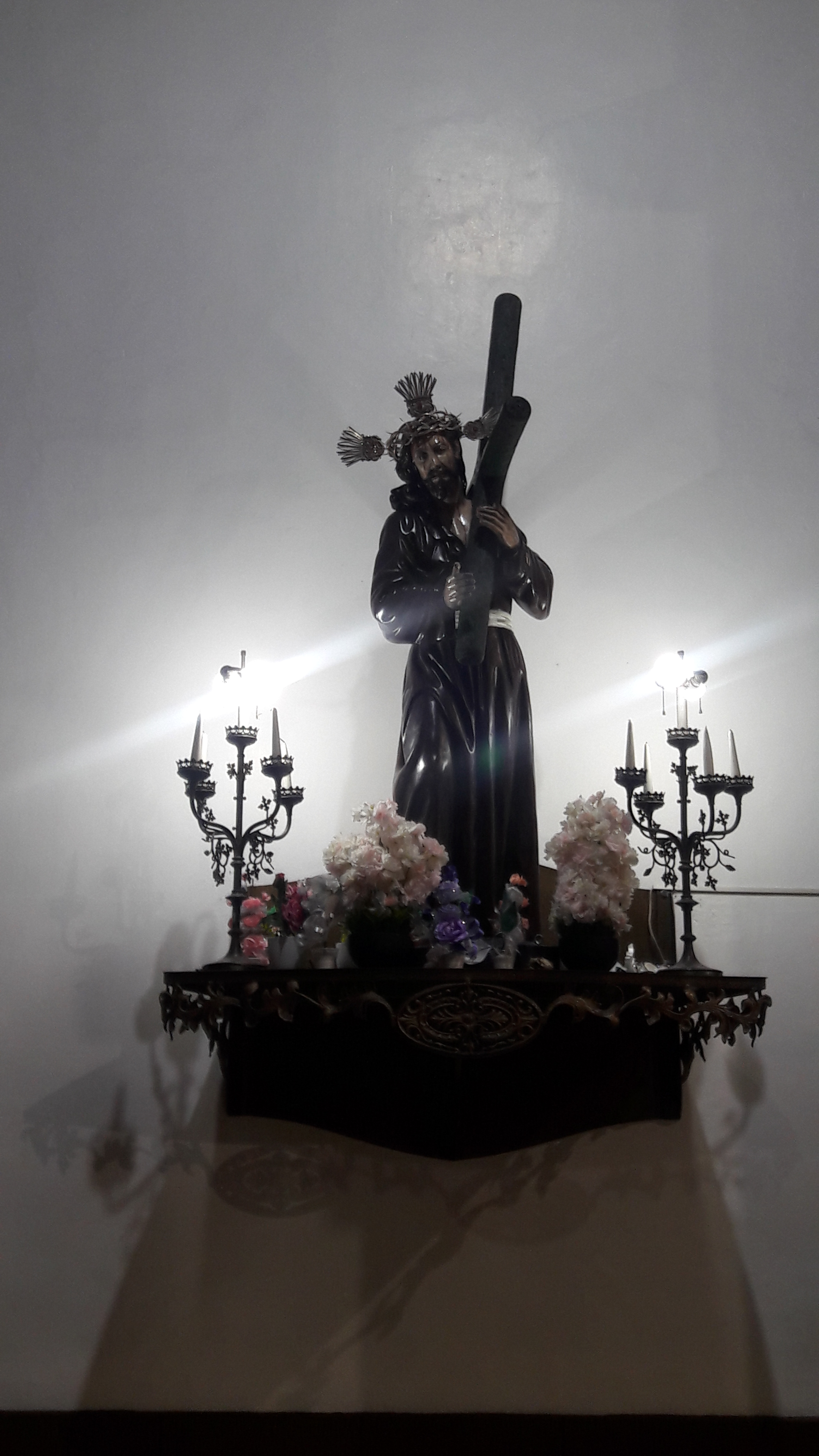
Jesus of the Great Power held up on an altar
