= Puñay =

Volcanic cone in Ecuador

Cerro Puñay is a volcanic cone in the Chunchi Canton of Ecuador.

== Possible structure ==
Since 2002 it has become a tourist attraction, based on the claim that at the top there is an ancient structure, referred to variously as a temple and a pyramid, possibly shaped like a macaw.

An alleged Quechua myth about a lost pyramid containing golden artifacts located somewhere in the Ecuadorian highlands supposedly lured both archeologists and grave robbers to the area in search of Puñay. In 2002 Christian Aguirre, a student in the School of Ecotourism in the University Politecnica de Chimborazo said that it had the formation of a giant macaw, a bird sacred to all Andean cultures.

In an interview Aguirre said with regards to the many holes in the pyramid "These holes were made about 50 to 70 years ago by gringos. Nobody knows what they took but many people here say there used to be a lot of gold"

In 2003, Eudoro Flores, the former mayor of the nearby city of Chunchi, was noted as saying "If you want gold, go to Puñay" but added he was impelled to promote the place for tourism to help its conservation, and prevent grave robbers from further desecrating the site.

== Declaration of "Spiritual Patrimony of the Peoples and Nations of Humanity" ==
On The 21st of June 2007 an "Ancestral meeting for the arrival of new times" was held on Puñay to celebrate Inti Raymi which marks the winter solstice. The Minister for Tourism in Ecuador at the time, María Isabel Salvador, along with the main authorities of Chimborazo province and indigenous leaders from the Sierra Centro described the event as a "symbolic act of enormous importance to the Andean people".

With the event started the process of declaring Puñay as the "Spiritual Patrimony of the Peoples and Nations of Humanity" The declaration also strengthened the tourism and cultural potential of the sacred site to help its future conservation and protect it from further desecration.

== See also ==
- Ingapirca
