= Tumebamba =

- Tumipampa (Quechua)
- Tomebamba
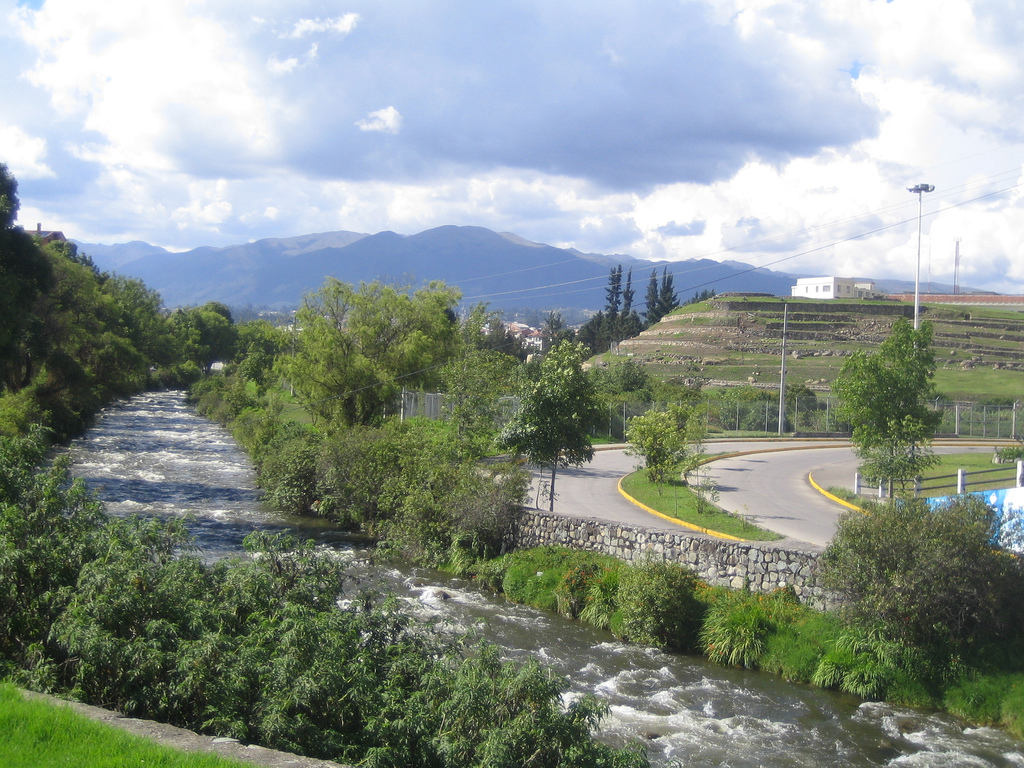
- The ruins of Pumapunku near the Tomebamba River in Cuenca
- Location in Cuenca
- 2°54′24″S 78°59′48″W
- Type: Ruined city
- Etymology: Kichwa for "Knife field"
- Periods: Pre-Columbian era
- Cultures: Inca
- Associated with: Huayna Capac
- Location: Cuenca, Ecuador

History
- Founded: Late 15th century
- Founder: Topa Inca Yupanqui
- Destroyed: ca. 1531

Site notes
- Material: Stone
- Architectural style: Inca
- Excavation dates: 2004
- Discovered: 1547

Tumebamba, Tomebamba (hispanicized spellings), or Tumipampa (Kichwa for "Knife Field", Tumi: Knife, Pampa: Field) was a main regional city in the Inca Empire. Tumebamba was chosen by the Emperor Huayna Capac (ruled 1493–1525) to be the Inca northern capital. The city was largely destroyed during the Inca Civil War between Huáscar and Atahualpa shortly before the arrival of the Spanish conquistadors in 1532. The Spanish city of Cuenca, Ecuador was built on the site of Tumebamba although a portion of the Inca city is preserved at the archaeological sites of Pumapunku and Todos Santos.

== History ==
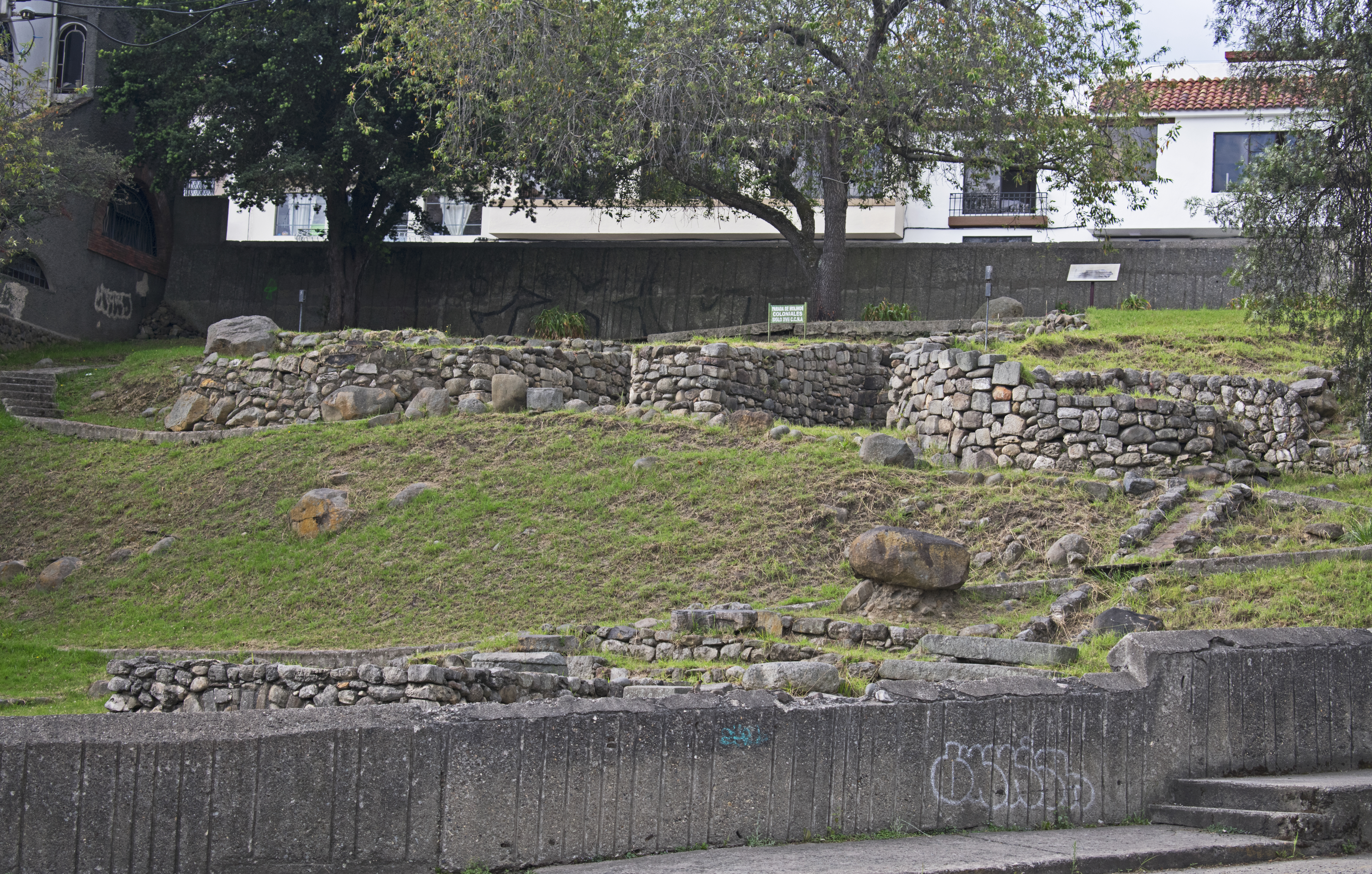
Los Molinos, the site of the mills at Todos Santos

The Tumebamba area prior to the conquest by the Incas was called Guapondelig. The ethnic Cañari people had lived in this area for at least 500 years before the arrival of the Incas. The Inca emperor Topa Inca Yupanqui (ruled 1471–1493) incorporated this area into the empire after long and arduous campaigns against the Cañari. His son and successor, Huayna Capac, was probably born in Tumebamba and was responsible for most of the Inca construction in the city. Huayna Capac envisioned Tumebamba as the northern capital of the Inca Empire and modeled the construction on that of Cuzco, the Inca capital. Huayna Capac had a royal palace here.

Spanish stories that Huanya Capac had building stones transported from Cuzco to Inca centers, including Tumebamba, in present-day Ecuador were confirmed in 2004. Archaeologists identified stone building blocks in Ecuador that had an origin in a quarry near Cuzco. The scholars found 450 stones, weighing up to 700 kilograms (1,500 lb) each, that had been transported more than 1,600 kilometres (990 mi) on Inca roads traversing the high and rugged Andes. The Incas lacked draft animals and wheeled vehicles so the transport was by manpower only, possibly by laborers conscripted by the Incas among the peoples who had opposed their rule. The monumental task of transporting the stones also indicates the priority Huayna Capac placed on making Tumebamba an alternative or secondary capital of the empire.

In the words of a scholar, "These stones embodied the transfer of sanctity and power from the imperial capital to the city of Tomebamba in Ecuador, while their movement was a major public demonstration of state control over labor." The Inca also quarried building stones at Cojitambo, 18 kilometres (11 mi) in a straight line distance northeast.

Huayna Capac and many other Incas died in an epidemic (probably of a European-introduced disease) about 1525 and his sons Huascar and Atahualpa contested the succession. Several battles in the civil war which followed were near Tumepampa and the Inca city was largely destroyed. The Cañari inhabitants had taken the side of Huascar and were severely treated by Atahualpa.

== Pumapunku and Todos Santos ==
The Spanish chronicler Pedro Cieza de León visited Tumebamba in 1547 and said, "Everything has crumbled and in ruins but you can still appreciate how grand it was." The city of Cuenca has been built on top of the old Inca city and whatever ruins remain are largely buried. The two surviving remnants of the Inca city are the ruins of Todos Santos and Pumapunku (or Pumapongo). The two ruins are within about 300 metres (980 ft) of each other and near the Tomebamba River. Neither site has the finely-worked stone characteristic of Cuzco, perhaps meaning that these sites were of secondary importance in the Inca city and that the principal temple and plaza has disappeared beneath later construction. Based on finding spinning tools in the buildings excavated at Pumapunku, the site may have a residence for aclla, the sequestered women of the Incas. A large artificial water pool, terraces, and canals resemble those at Quispiguanca, a royal estate of Huayna Capac in the Sacred Valley near Cuzco.

The Manuel Agustín Landivar Museum is adjacent to the Todos Santos ruins and the Pumapungo Museum and Archaeological Park is at the Pumapunku ruins. xco. Both feature exhibits about the Indigenous people of the Americas, the Cañari, the Inca, and the early Spanish settlers.

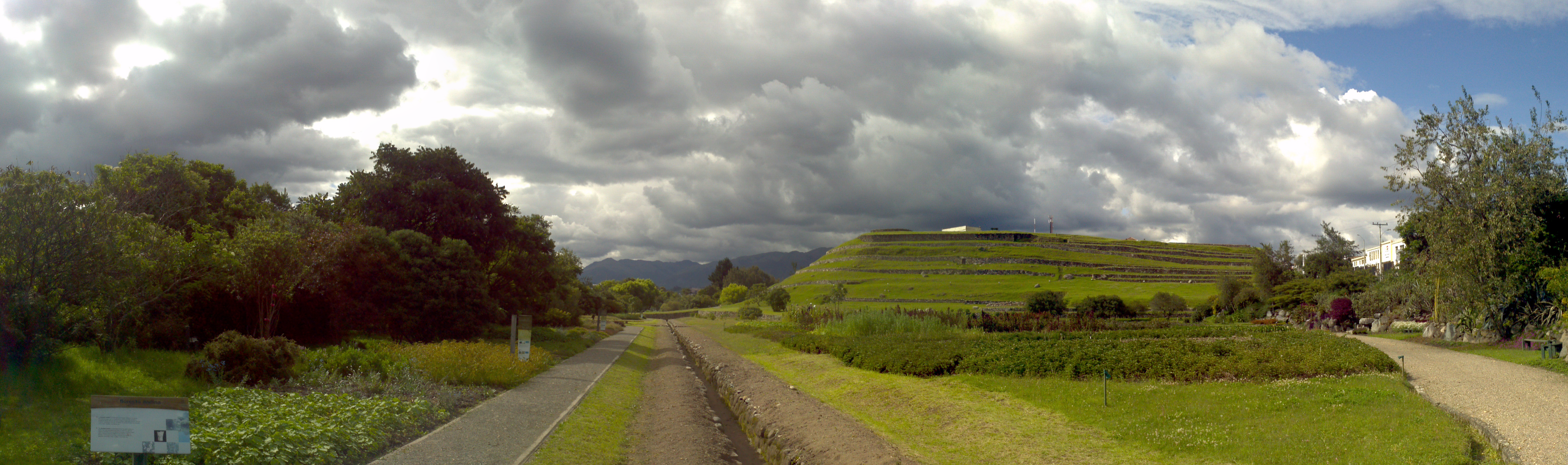
Panoramic view of the ruins of Pumapunku

== See also ==
- Cusco
- Huánuco Pampa
- Jauja
- Pachacamac
- Vilcabamba, Peru
