= Déleg Canton =

- Canton
- Location of Cañar Province in Ecuador.

- Déleg Canton in Cañar Province
- Coordinates: 2°46′24″S 78°55′09″W
- Country: Ecuador
- Province: Cañar Province
- Time zone: UTC-5 (ECT)

Déleg (Spanish pronunciation: [ˈdeleɣ]) is a canton of Ecuador, located in the Cañar Province. Its capital is the town of Déleg. Its population at the 2001 census was 6,221.
