= Azogues =

Azogues San Francisco de Peleusí de Azogues
- City
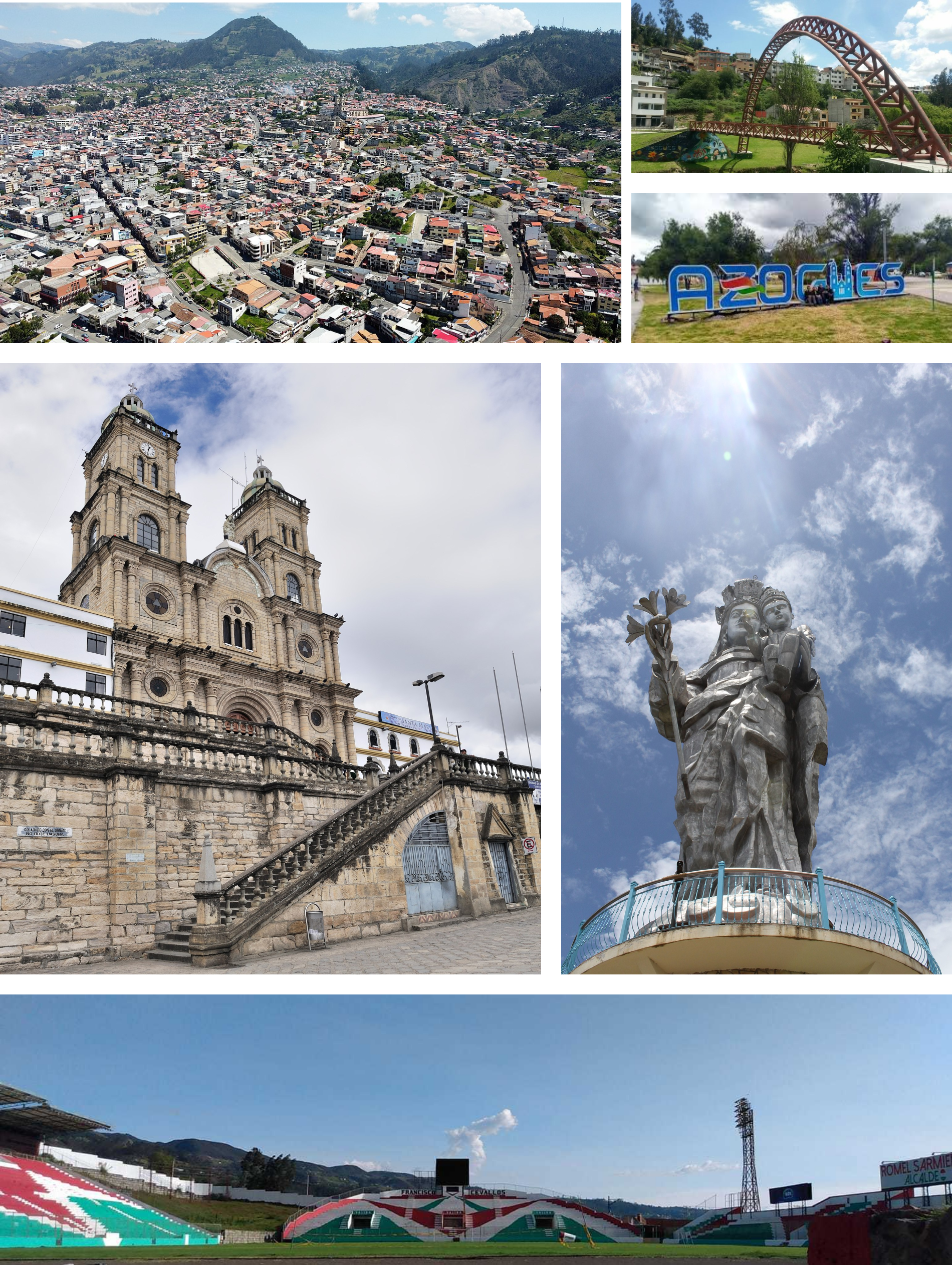
- From top, left to right: Panoramic view of the city, Pedestrian Bridge of the Burgay River, Marco Romero Heredia Children's Park, Sanctuary of Our Lady of the Cloud, Virgin of the Cloud viewpoint on the Abuga hill and Jorge Andrade Cantos Stadium.

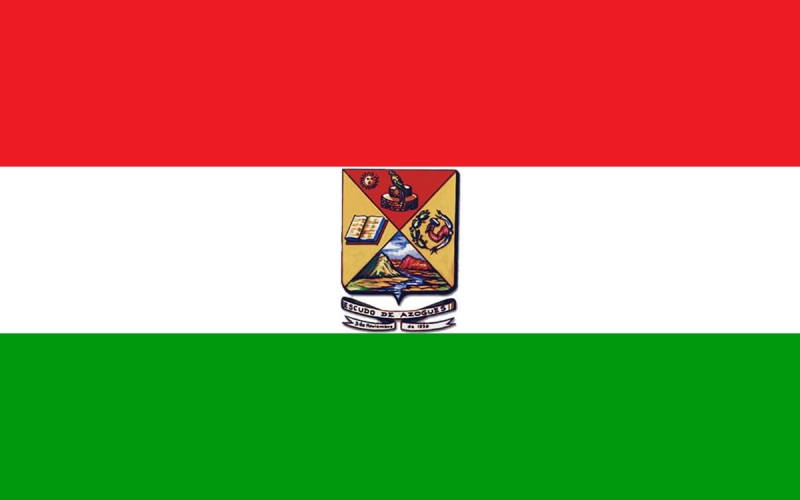
- Flag

- Location within Ecuador
- Coordinates: 2°44′S 78°50′W
- Country: Ecuador
- Province: Cañar
- Canton: Azogues
- Founded: April 16, 1825

Government
  - Mayor: Javier Serrano

Area
  - City: 14.34 km^{2} (5.54 sq mi)
- Elevation: 2,518 m (8,261 ft)

Population (2022 census)
  - City: 35,763
  - Density: 2,494/km^{2} (6,459/sq mi)
- Demonym: Azogueño
- Time zone: UTC-5 (EST)
- Climate: Cfb
- Website: www.azogues.gob.ec (in Spanish)

Azogues (Spanish pronunciation: [aˈsoɣes]) is the capital of Azogues Canton and of Cañar Province in Ecuador.

Azogues Canton has a population of 74,515 (2022 census).Azogues joined the UNESCO Global Network of Learning Cities in 2024.

Azogues is located at 2,518 meters above sea level (8,261 feet), its population is of 35,763 and its average temperature is 17 °C (63 °F). It is also known for its Panama hat industry (jipi japa); the hats are produced primarily for export.

It was founded on 4 October 1562, by Gil Ramirez Davalos. Initially part of the old Township of Cuenca, in 1775 it was promoted to parish status.

== Religion ==
San Francisco Cathedral is the seat of the Roman Catholic Diocese of Azogues (established 1968), split from its present Metropolitan, the Archdiocese of Cuenca.

== Transportation ==
- Azogues is well connected on land to Cuenca by via rapida Biblian–Azogues–Cuenca; currently being widened to 6 lanes. It connects to Quito via I35 and to Guayaquil via I40, both newly improved branches of the Pan-American Highway.
- Azogues uses Mariscal Lamar Regional Airport located in Cuenca.

Azogues is the capital of the Cañar Province and the second largest city in the Cuenca Metropolitan Area with 700,000 inhabitants.

== Climate ==
Climate data for Azogues/Biblián, elevation 2,640 m (8,660 ft), (1986–1995)
Month	Jan	Feb	Mar	Apr	May	Jun	Jul	Aug	Sep	Oct	Nov	Dec	Year
Mean daily maximum °C (°F)	20.8 (69.4)	20.7 (69.3)	20.5 (68.9)	20.3 (68.5)	19.9 (67.8)	17.7 (63.9)	17.6 (63.7)	17.7 (63.9)	19.3 (66.7)	20.4 (68.7)	21.2 (70.2)	21.5 (70.7)	19.8 (67.6)
Daily mean °C (°F)	15.1 (59.2)	15.0 (59.0)	14.8 (58.6)	15.0 (59.0)	14.6 (58.3)	13.8 (56.8)	12.8 (55.0)	13.1 (55.6)	14.0 (57.2)	14.5 (58.1)	15.0 (59.0)	15.4 (59.7)	14.4 (58.0)
Mean daily minimum °C (°F)	9.4 (48.9)	9.5 (49.1)	9.6 (49.3)	9.7 (49.5)	9.2 (48.6)	8.7 (47.7)	7.7 (45.9)	7.3 (45.1)	8.1 (46.6)	8.6 (47.5)	8.6 (47.5)	8.6 (47.5)	8.7 (47.8)
Average precipitation mm (inches)	61.7 (2.43)	104.2 (4.10)	121.0 (4.76)	115.6 (4.55)	72.4 (2.85)	44.8 (1.76)	47.2 (1.86)	33.5 (1.32)	42.4 (1.67)	80.7 (3.18)	104.9 (4.13)	68.2 (2.69)	896.6 (35.3)
Average relative humidity (%)	77.4	79.7	78.9	78.6	78.0	78.3	76.9	77.2	76.5	77.4	75.1	73.1	77.3
Source: Instituto Nacional de Meteorología e Hidrología

Climate data for Cañar, elevation 3,083 m (10,115 ft), (1997–2004)
Month	Jan	Feb	Mar	Apr	May	Jun	Jul	Aug	Sep	Oct	Nov	Dec	Year
Mean daily maximum °C (°F)	17.1 (62.8)	17.2 (63.0)	17.2 (63.0)	17.3 (63.1)	17.1 (62.8)	16.7 (62.1)	16.0 (60.8)	15.9 (60.6)	17.1 (62.8)	17.4 (63.3)	17.5 (63.5)	17.3 (63.1)	17.0 (62.6)
Daily mean °C (°F)	11.9 (53.4)	12.2 (54.0)	12.2 (54.0)	12.4 (54.3)	12.5 (54.5)	12.0 (53.6)	11.5 (52.7)	11.6 (52.9)	12.2 (54.0)	12.4 (54.3)	12.2 (54.0)	12.0 (53.6)	12.1 (53.8)
Mean daily minimum °C (°F)	7.1 (44.8)	8.0 (46.4)	8.0 (46.4)	8.1 (46.6)	8.5 (47.3)	7.8 (46.0)	7.4 (45.3)	7.3 (45.1)	7.8 (46.0)	7.8 (46.0)	7.4 (45.3)	7.7 (45.9)	7.7 (45.9)
Average precipitation mm (inches)	39.1 (1.54)	46.8 (1.84)	74.6 (2.94)	56.9 (2.24)	51.2 (2.02)	27.2 (1.07)	16.7 (0.66)	14.0 (0.55)	33.5 (1.32)	38.6 (1.52)	42.7 (1.68)	45.9 (1.81)	487.2 (19.19)
Average relative humidity (%)	76.5	79.7	79.0	76.6	74.9	74.1	74.4	73.0	72.1	72.4	76.3	78.1	75.6
Source: Instituto Nacional de Meteorología e Hidrología

== Sources and External links ==
- The Best of Ecuador - Cañar
- GCatholic - cathedral, with Google satellite map
- Azogues, Cuenca Property Market Report
- www.azoguenos.com The cyber community of Azogues in the world.
- Azogues Ecuador: An Easy Day Trip From Cuenca
