= Cañar Canton =

Cañar, Ecuador
- Canton
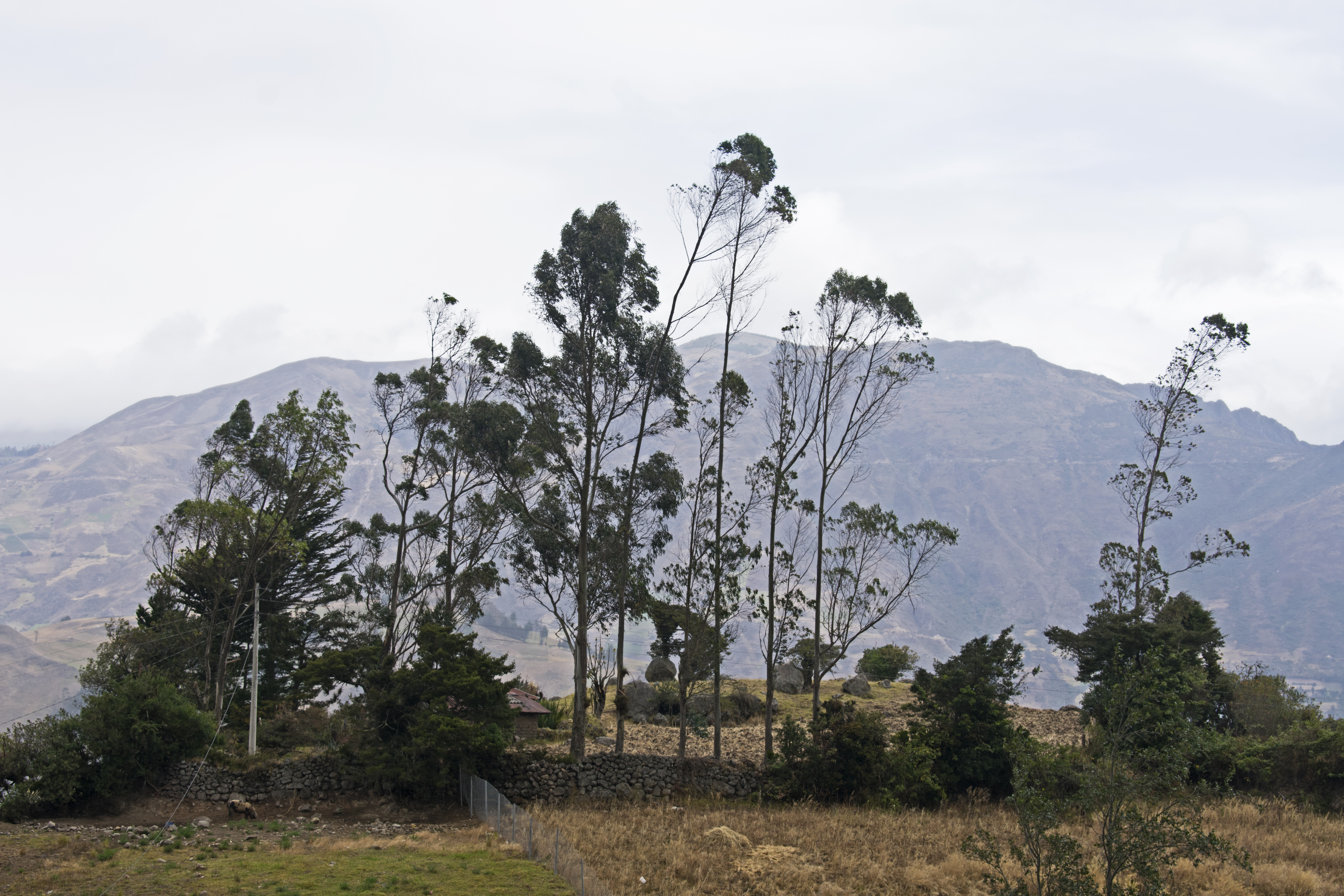
- View of the mountains south of Río San Antonio, Yaculona

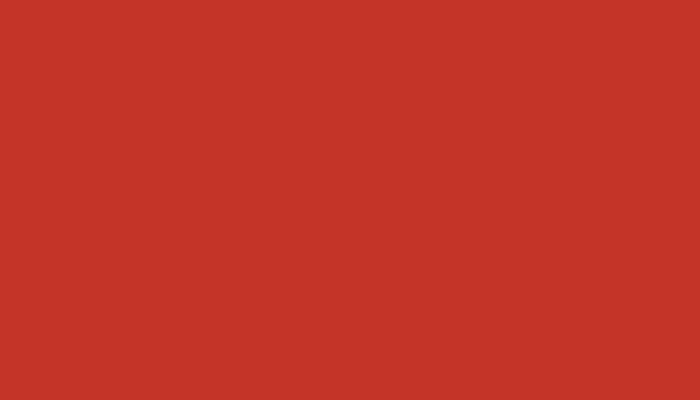
- Flag

- Location of Cañar Province in Ecuador.

- Cañar Canton in Cañar Province
- Coordinates: 2.4837°S 78.9784°W
- Country: Ecuador
- Province: Cañar Province
- Elevation: 10,370 ft (3,160 m)
- Time zone: UTC-5 (ECT)

Cañar Canton is a canton of Ecuador, located in the Cañar Province. Its capital is the town of Cañar. Its population at the 2001 census was 58,185.

== Climate ==
Climate data for Cañar, elevation 3,140 m (10,300 ft), (1971–2000)
Month	Jan	Feb	Mar	Apr	May	Jun	Jul	Aug	Sep	Oct	Nov	Dec	Year
Mean daily maximum °C (°F)	16.4 (61.5)	16.0 (60.8)	16.1 (61.0)	16.0 (60.8)	16.0 (60.8)	15.3 (59.5)	14.7 (58.5)	15.2 (59.4)	15.9 (60.6)	16.7 (62.1)	16.5 (61.7)	16.8 (62.2)	16.0 (60.7)
Mean daily minimum °C (°F)	6.8 (44.2)	7.0 (44.6)	7.2 (45.0)	7.1 (44.8)	7.2 (45.0)	6.3 (43.3)	6.2 (43.2)	6.4 (43.5)	6.6 (43.9)	6.5 (43.7)	5.9 (42.6)	6.4 (43.5)	6.6 (43.9)
Average precipitation mm (inches)	38.0 (1.50)	54.0 (2.13)	65.0 (2.56)	65.0 (2.56)	40.0 (1.57)	26.0 (1.02)	22.0 (0.87)	18.0 (0.71)	29.0 (1.14)	46.0 (1.81)	41.0 (1.61)	32.0 (1.26)	476 (18.74)
Average relative humidity (%)	80	81	79	79	78	72	73	72	73	78	75	78	77
Source: FAO
