= Pumapungo Museum =

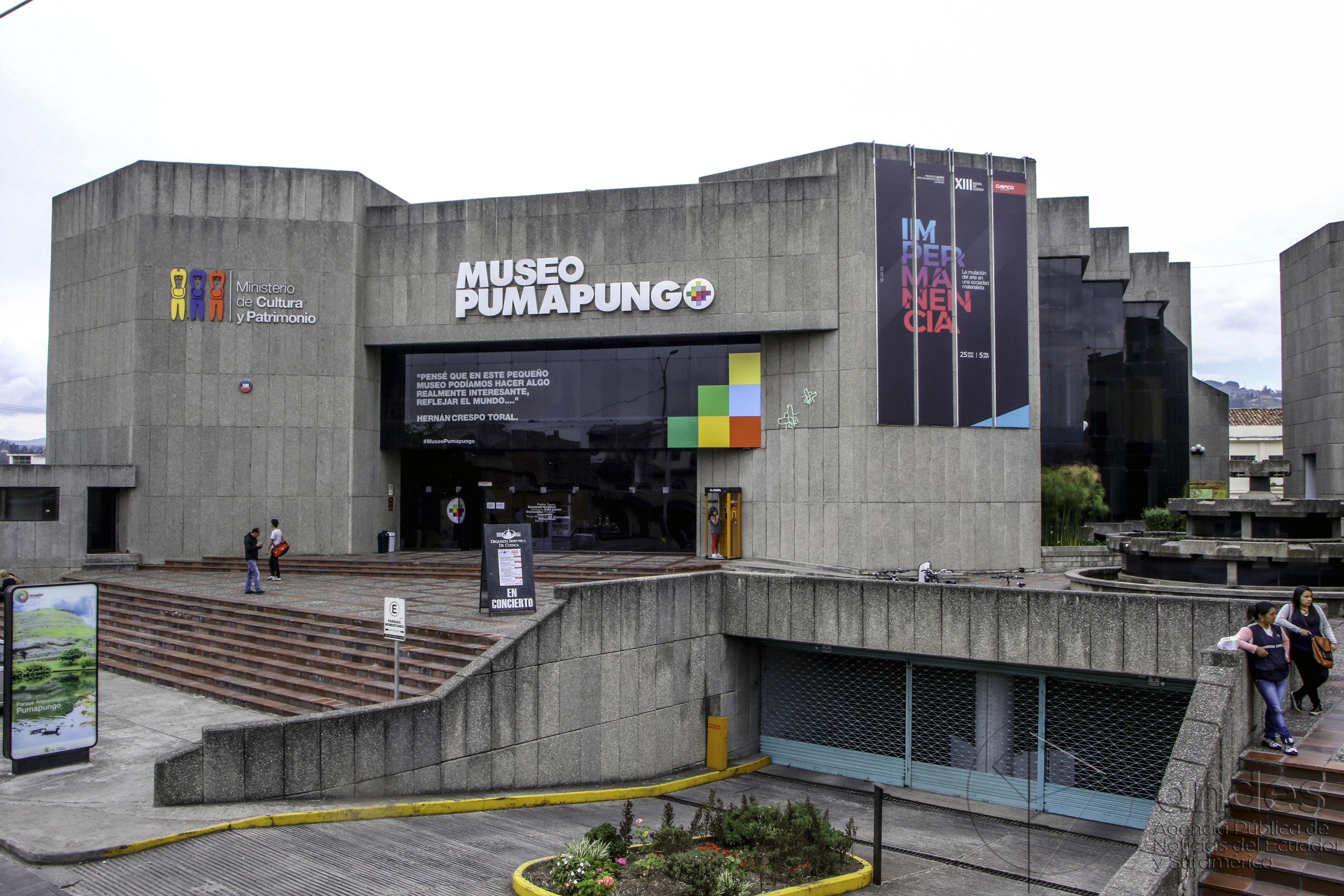
- Established: 1979
- Location: Cuenca, Ecuador
- Coordinates: 2.905964°S 78.997076°W
- Type: Ethnographic & Art museum

The Pumapungo Museum (Spanish: Museo Pumapungo) is an ethnographic and art museum in Cuenca, Ecuador.

== History ==
The museum was founded in 1979, the name Pumapungo means "Puma Bridge". In 2019, the museum temporarily exhibited 37 works by Salvador Dalí.

== Collections ==
The museum has ethnographic collections that include traditional costumes, objects representative of the beliefs and rites of the peoples of Ecuador. The museum has a room about baroque art dating from the 18th century. The museum has reconstructions of Afro-Ecuadorian houses from the province of Esmeraldas. The museum also has tzantzas from the Shuar people. The museum has rooms dedicated to archaeology and ethnography, including ceramics and ucuyayas, which are amulets that represent mythical characters. The museum contains a collection of 5000 cassettes, these contain films of Ecuadorian cinema, also includes musical recordings, the collection is composed of 600 betamax, 1500 VHS and 3080 Cassette tapes. In 2015, the exhibition "Poéticas del presente" (Poetics of the Present) was presented, in which works by 8 Ecuadorian artists were exhibited. The museum presented an exhibition about Latin American jewelry in 2018, in which 34 jewelers participated. In January 2018, the museum housed a collection of 6445 recovered objects including pots, ocarinas and statuettes, these collections had been recovered since 2008, some of the recovered objects came from different cultures such as Puruhá, Guangala and Jama Coaque; also the objects came from private collections in Ecuador and other countries such as Colombia, Peru, Chile, Argentina, Spain, United States, Italy, Denmark and Egypt.

The archaeological park of Pumapunku is part of the museum.
