= Instituto Nacional de Meteorología e Hidrología (Ecuador) =

The Instituto Nacional Meteorologia e Hidrologia (INAMHI) is the national meteorological agency of Ecuador.

INAMHI's functions are:

- Planning, directing, and overseeing meteorological and hydrological activity in coordination with other agencies.
- Developing systems and rules governing the programs of meteorology and hydrology in accordance with national needs;
- Establishing, operating and maintaining the infrastructure necessary for a basic hydrometeorological compliance program;
- Obtaining, collecting, examining, processing, publishing and disseminating data, information and forecasts necessary for the detailed and comprehensive knowledge of weather, climate and hydrological characteristics of the whole of maritime and continental Ecuador;
- Conducting studies and researching hydrometeorological requests for state agencies or individuals;
- Educating and training staff to technical and professional expertise in the fields of meteorology and hydrology, and
- Promoting scientific research in meteorology and hydrology.

Research conducted by the INAMHI includes studying the hydrology of the Ecuadorian Amazon basin.
