= Cañar Province =

Province of Ecuador

Coordinates: 2°44′S 78°50′W

Cañar
- Province
- Province of Cañar
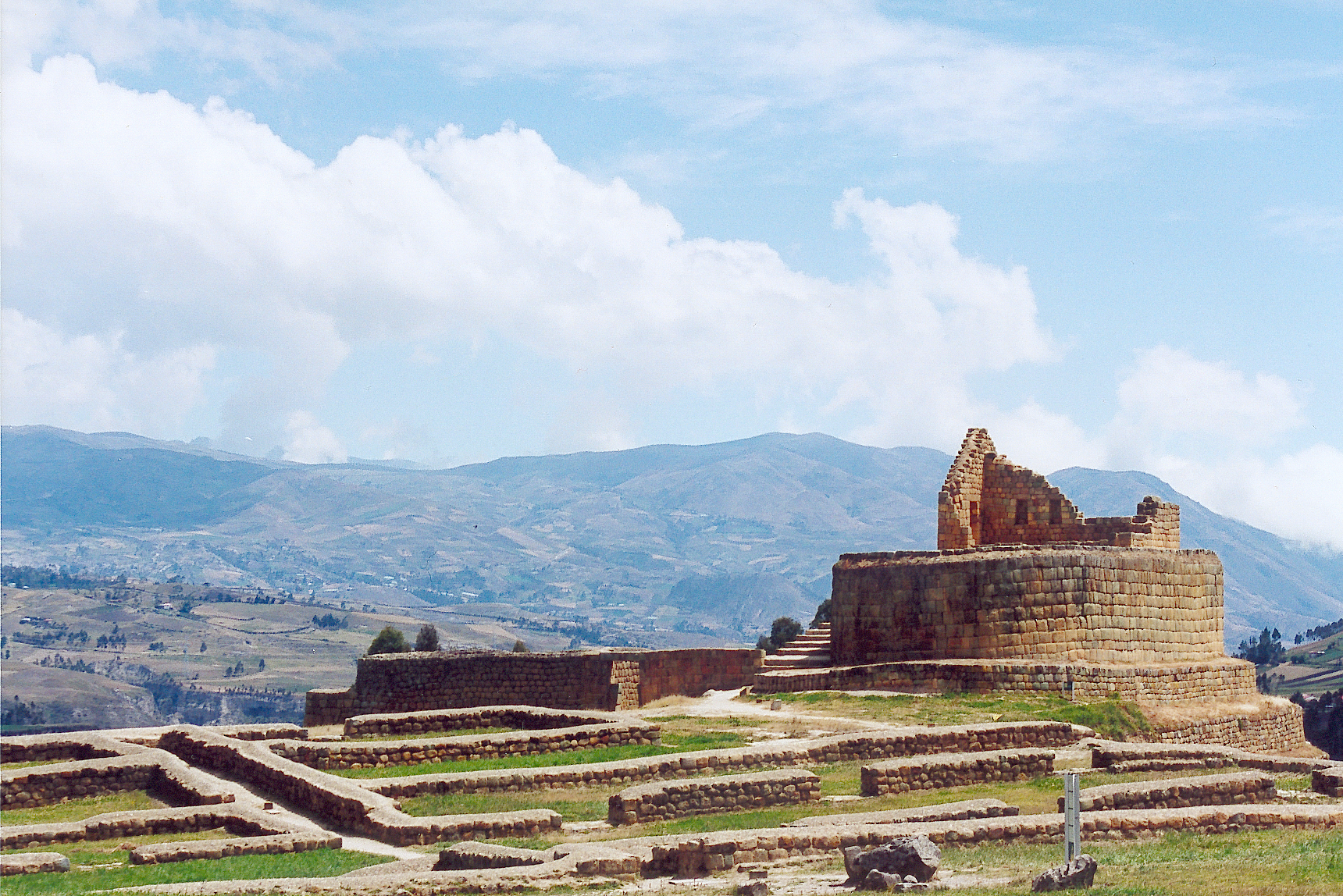
- Ingapirca

- Flag

- Cañar Province in Ecuador

- Cantons of Cañar Province
- Country: Ecuador
- Established: November 4, 1880
- Recognized: April 25, 1884
- Named after: Cañari
- Capital: Azogues
- Largest city: La Troncal
- Cantons: List of cantons: Azogues; Biblián; Cañar; Déleg; El Tambo; Suscal; La Troncal

Government
  - Prefect: Marcelo Jaramillo (RC)
  - Vice Prefect: Ximena Andrade
  - Governor: David Crespo Cárdenas

Area
  - Total: 3,647 km^{2} (1,408 sq mi)

Population (2022 census)
  - Total: 227,578
  - Density: 62.40/km^{2} (161.6/sq mi)
- Time zone: ECT
- Vehicle registration: U
- HDI (2017): 0.727 high · 12th
- Website: www.hcpcanar.gov.ec

Cañar (Spanish pronunciation: [kaˈɲaɾ]) is a province in Ecuador. The capital is Azogues. At the time of census 2010 the province had a population of 225,184. It contains the 16th-century ruins of Ingapirca, the best-known Inca settlement in Ecuador and a product of their conquest of the indigenous Cañari.

== Demographics ==
Ethnic groups as of the Ecuadorian census of 2010:

- Mestizo 76.7%
- Indigenous 15.2%
- White 4.3%
- Afro-Ecuadorian 2.6%
- Montubio 1.1%
- Other 0.2%

== Cantons ==
The province is divided into 7 cantons. The following table lists each with its population at the time of the 2001 census, its area in square kilometres (km^{2}), and the name of the canton seat or capital.

Canton	Pop. (2019)	Area (km^{2})	Seat/Capital
Azogues	85,030	613	Azogues
Biblián	23,590	227	Biblián
Cañar	68,190	1,804	Cañar
Déleg	6,760	78	Déleg
El Tambo	12,200	65	El Tambo
Suscal	6,390	31	Suscal
La Troncal	74,680	328	La Troncal

3

== See also ==
- Ingapirca
- Cañari
- Sangay National Park
- Provinces of Ecuador
- Cantons of Ecuador
