= Pedro Moncayo Canton =

Coordinates: 0°13′S 78°31′W

Pedro Moncayo Cantón Pedro Moncayo
- Canton
- Pedro Moncayo Canton
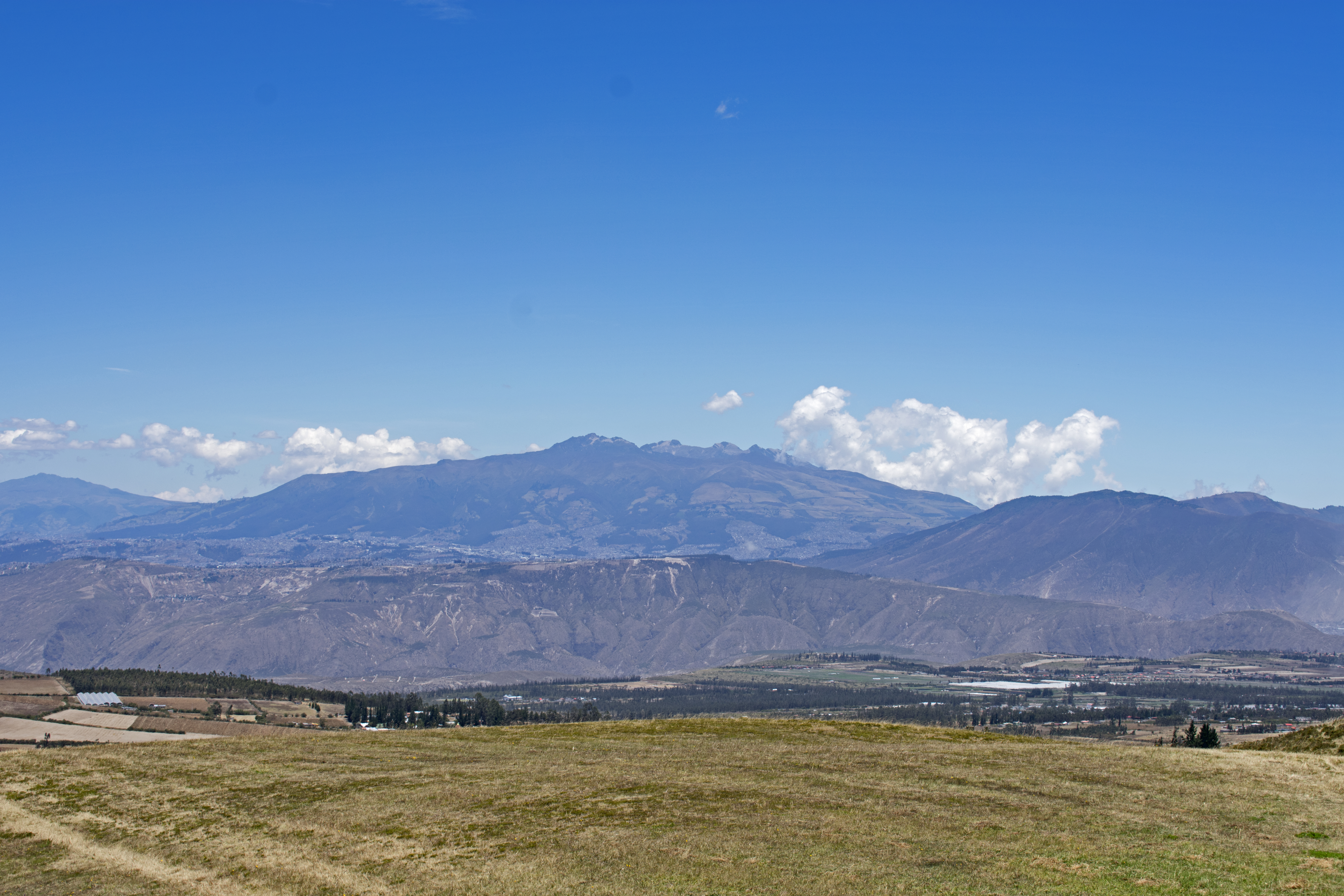
- View from Cochasquí to the southwest

- Flag

- Location of Pichincha Province in Ecuador.

- Pedro Moncayo Canton in Pichincha Province
- Country: Ecuador
- Province: Pichincha
- Creation of the canton: 1911-09-26
- Named for: Pedro Moncayo
- Canton seat: Tabacundo
- Parishes: Tabacundo, La Esperanza, Malchinguí

Government
  - Type: Municipality

Area
  - Total: 334.3 km^{2} (129.1 sq mi)

Population (2022 census)
  - Total: 40,483
  - Density: 121.1/km^{2} (313.6/sq mi)
- Time zone: UTC-5 (ECT)
- Postal code: EC1704 (new format), P04 (old format)
- Area code: 593 2
- Website: http://www.pedromoncayo.gov.ec

Pedro Moncayo is a canton in the north of the Pichincha Province, Ecuador. The seat of the canton is the city of Tabacundo. The canton is named after politician Pedro Moncayo. The canton is separated by the Mojanda volcano from the canton of Otavalo in the province of Imbabura in the north. It borders the same-province cantons of Cayambe and Quito.
