= Quilago =

Caranqui queen and military leader

Quilago (c. 1490–1515) was the queen regnant of Cochasquí, in modern-day Ecuador. She is known for leading native resistance to the expansion of the Inca Empire and was supposedly the mother of Atahualpa, the last Sapa Inca. Her story has become an origin myth in Ecuadorian national mythology, which has retroactively framed her as an Ecuadorian rebel against Peruvian invaders.

== Biography ==
Location of the Caranqui culture in modern-day Ecuador

Quilago was a princess of the Caranqui people. The name by which she is commonly known, Quilago, was a female military rank derived from the Tsafiki language word "quela" (English: feline); it is commonly confused for the noble title of Queen. Her proper name is unknown, so she is commonly referred to by her title, although the name Quilago Túpac Palla has appeared in some sources. Quilago was from Cochasquí, which in the modern era is considered an emblematic site of the Kingdom of Quito. She became ruler of Cochasquí at a time when the Inca Empire was expanding northwards, into the lands of the Caranqui. As queen, Quilago formed a united front with neighboring indigenous societies to militarily resist the expansion of the Inca. She fortified the north bank of the Pisque river, in order to halt the Inca advance.

Inca expansion under Huayna Capac (green)

The Caranqui's conflict with the Inca began in c. 1500. Quilago's military coalition managed to keep the invading Inca at bay for two years, during which many troops were killed and the bridges across the river destroyed in fire. Huayna Capac, the Sapa Inca, tactically withdrew his forces, telling his soldiers that he had been promised victory by the Sun God and that they ought not to be intimidated by an army led by a woman. He then set fire to the grasslands where Quilago's soldiers were hidden and bypassed the river. Quilago's forces were ultimately defeated.

Cochasquí was besieged by the Inca, who managed to break their way into the city and arrest Quilago. She was ransomed for gold and allowed to return to her palace, but she remained a prisoner of the Inca. In order to prevent the further destruction of her community, she was forced to marry the man that had conquered her kingdom, Huayna Capac. In the end, this had the effect of solidifying Inca control over her people. Quilago bore the Sapa Inca's child; according to the archaeological narrative of Cochasquí, which has been supported by some historians, their child was Atahualpa, the final Sapa Inca before the Spanish conquest of the Inca Empire.

Quilago then began to plot the murder of Huayna Capac. She sent him love letters, with the intention of leading him to a well that she had dug in her apartments and pushing him into it. She hoped that without their Sapa Inca, the imperial troops would be unable to rally and would easily fall to an attack by her own warriors. However, she was betrayed by her own servants, who informed Huayna Capac of her plans. With forewarning, Huayna Capac went to her rooms and instead pushed her down the hole, along with her serving maids. Anthropologists Frank Salamone and Sabine Hyland consider this story to be a folkloric explanation for the use of shaft tombs in Quito.

In reaction to her death, an insurrection broke out in the occupied Caranqui region. The Caranqui secured Sarance (present-day Otavalo), which was attacked by the Sapa Inca's brother Tuma. Many soldiers on both sides died, including Tuma himself. With much of his army killed, the Sapa Inca brought reinforcements from the south and attacked the Caranqui in a pincer movement. The Caranqui were forced out towards the lake of Yawarkucha, where they were finally wiped out in battle. Quilago's son Atahualpa later rose to become the Sapa Inca and was executed by the Spanish conquistadors in 1533.

== Legacy ==
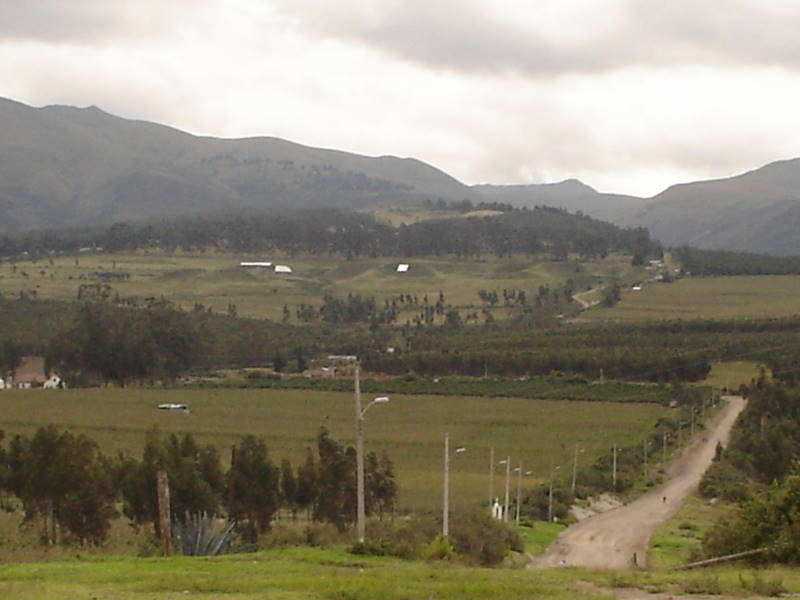
Modern day site of Cochasquí

Quilago's legend was passed down by the indigenous peoples of Ecuador. It was recorded in the Quito Manuscript by the Spanish chronicler Fernando de Montesinos. The title of "Quilago" has since been passed down into the surnames of northern Andean peoples, including Abaquilago, Angoquilago, Arraquilago, Imbaquilago, Paraquilago and Quilango.

As the final ruler of Cochasquí, Quilago has taken a central position in archaeological narratives of the Inca conquest of Ecuador. The story of Quilago's reign has also become an origin myth in the history of Ecuador, drawing on contemporary ideas of indigeneity and gender to construct an Ecuadorian national identity. In this national narrative, Atahualpa has been held to be the "first true Ecuadorian" or a "son of Ecuador" due to his mixed heritage from Quilago and Huayna Capac. In the 1930s, this theory provoked the Armed Forces of Ecuador to search for her remains, in order to "reclaim the mother of the nation". In the ruins of Cochasquí, the site's museum has been named after Quilago and tour guides have made her the protagonist of the stories they tell about the site.

Cochasquí and Quilago herself have been appropriated by Ecuadorian national mythology, which retroactively re-framed the history in terms of modern nation states. The portrayal of Quilago's forces as native Ecuadorians resisting Peruvian invaders has led to some Peruvian tourists abandoning tours of Cochasquí. According to archaeologist O. Hugo Benavides, the history's appropriation by Ecuadorian nationalist narratives has also served to deny the indigenous peoples of Ecuador their own historical continuity, while they are themselves still subjected to racism and discrimination by Ecuadorian society.

Benavides has also pointed out that, despite Quilago's representation of "[female] courage and maternal concern", which broke with traditional gender roles, the site of Cochasquí has been "masculinized to represent the pre-Hispanic community's members' courage against the foreign conquerors". To Benavides, Quilago's narrative has been used to legitimise sexist ideas of a nation's heroic masculinity: "[Quilago] escapes the inferior feminine depiction of Ecuadorian womanhood only to be burdened by the masculine characteristics of courage, strength and unwieldy spirit".

== See also ==
- Paccha Duchicela
- Mama Waqu

== Bibliography ==
- Becker, Marc; Tutillo, Silvia (2009). "La etnohistoria del cantón Cayambe". Historia agraria y social de Cayambe (in Spanish). Quito: Latin American Faculty of Social Sciences. pp. 11–44. ISBN 978-9978-67-214-3.
- Benavides, O. Hugo (2008). "Archaeology, Globalization and the Nation: Appropriating the Past in Ecuador". In Silverman, Helaine; Isbell, William H. (eds.). The Handbook of South American Archaeology. Springer. pp. 1063–1072. doi:10.1007/978-0-387-74907-5_53. ISBN 9780387752280.
- Benavides, O. Hugo (2009). "Narratives of Power, the Power of Narratives: The Failing Foundational Narrative of the Ecuadorian Nation". In Walkowitz, Daniel J.; Knauer, Lisa Maya (eds.). Contested Histories in Public Space: Memory, Race, and Nation. Duke University Press. pp. 178–196. ISBN 9780822391425.
- Benavides, O. Hugo (2011). "'Our ancestors the Incas': Andean warring over the conquering pasts". In Gegner, Martin; Ziino, Bart (eds.). The Heritage of War. Routledge. pp. 127–141. doi:10.4324/9780203809204-9 (inactive 12 July 2025). ISBN 9780203809204.
- Fine-Dare, Kathleen S. (2019). "Northern Andean Landscapes of Movement and History". Urban Mountain Beings: History, Indigeneity, and Geographies of Time in Quito, Ecuador. Lexington Books. pp. 21–46. ISBN 9781498575942.
- Galindo Castro, Mauricio (12 December 2008). "Quilago: ¿Un símbolo quiteño?" [Quilago: A Quiteño Symbol?]. Apachita (in Spanish) (14). Pontifical Catholic University of Ecuador. OCLC 302320348. Archived from the original on 14 July 2024.
- Hyland, Sabine (2007). The Quito Manuscript: An Inca History Preserved by Fernando de Montesinos (PDF). Yale University. ISBN 9780913516249. OCLC 964732009.
- Naranjo Gomezjurado, Mauricio (4 September 2014). "Quilago: Una generala Caranqui" [Quilago: A Caranqui General]. Ibarra (in Spanish). Archived from the original on 26 May 2015.
