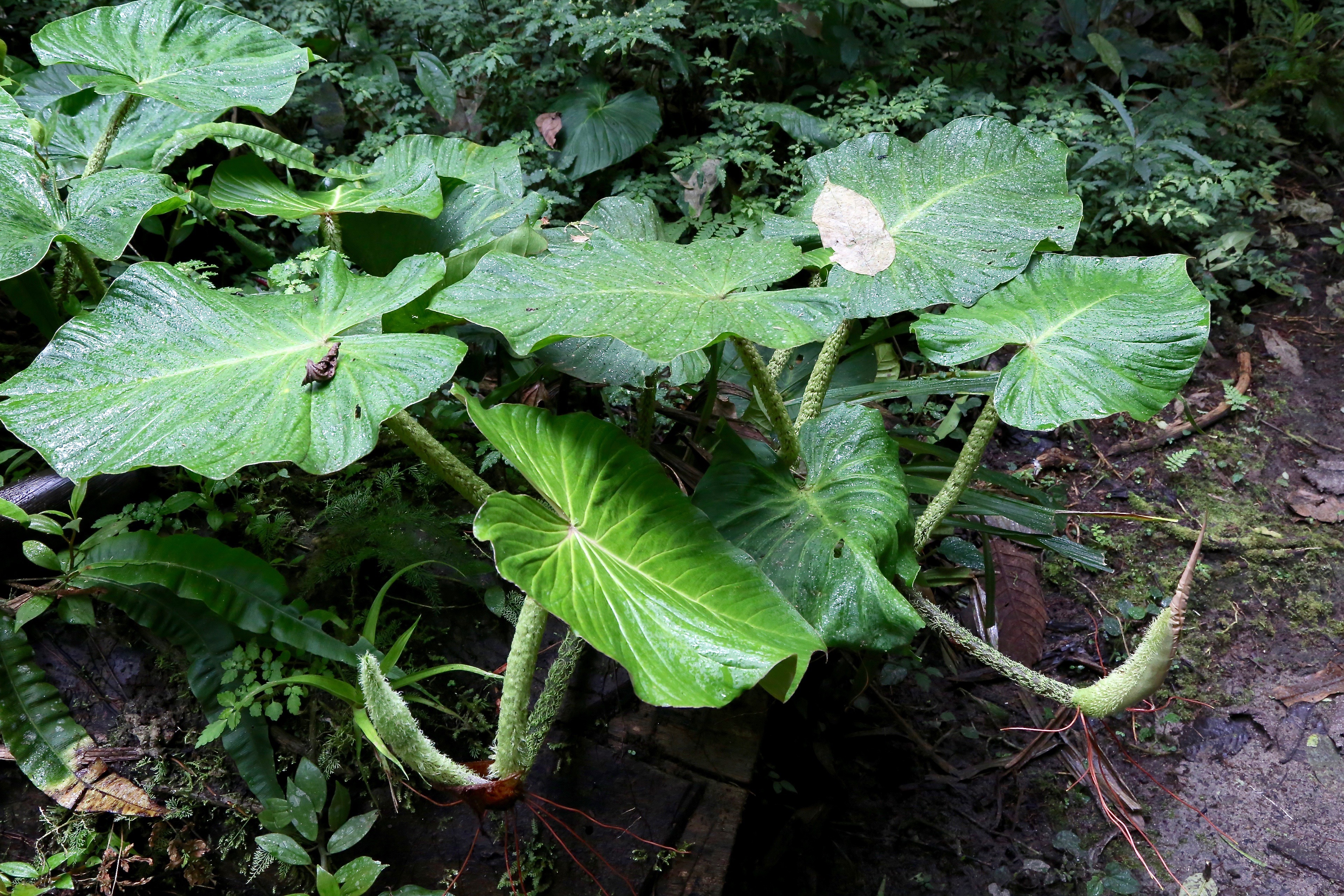
- In the Mindo Valley, Ecuador
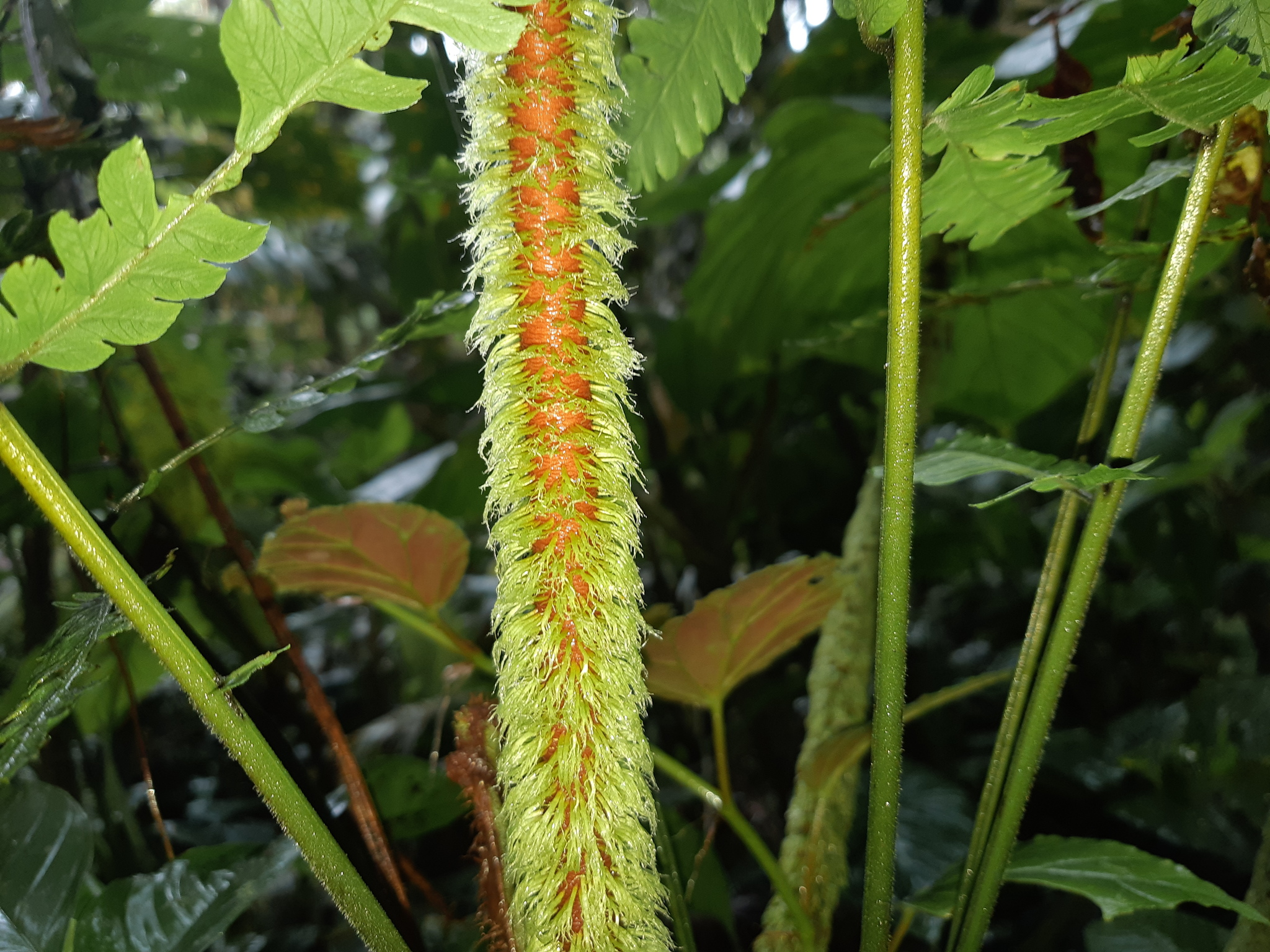
- Petiole

Scientific classification
- Kingdom: Plantae
- Clade: Tracheophytes
- Clade: Angiosperms
- Clade: Monocots
- Order: Alismatales
- Family: Araceae
- Genus: Philodendron
- Species: P. fibrosum

Binomial name
- Philodendron fibrosum Sodiro ex Croat

= Philodendron fibrosum =

Species of plant

Philodendron fibrosum is a species of flowering plant in the family Araceae. It is native to Colombia and Ecuador. A climber with rotund leaves, it is typically found in the wet tropics.

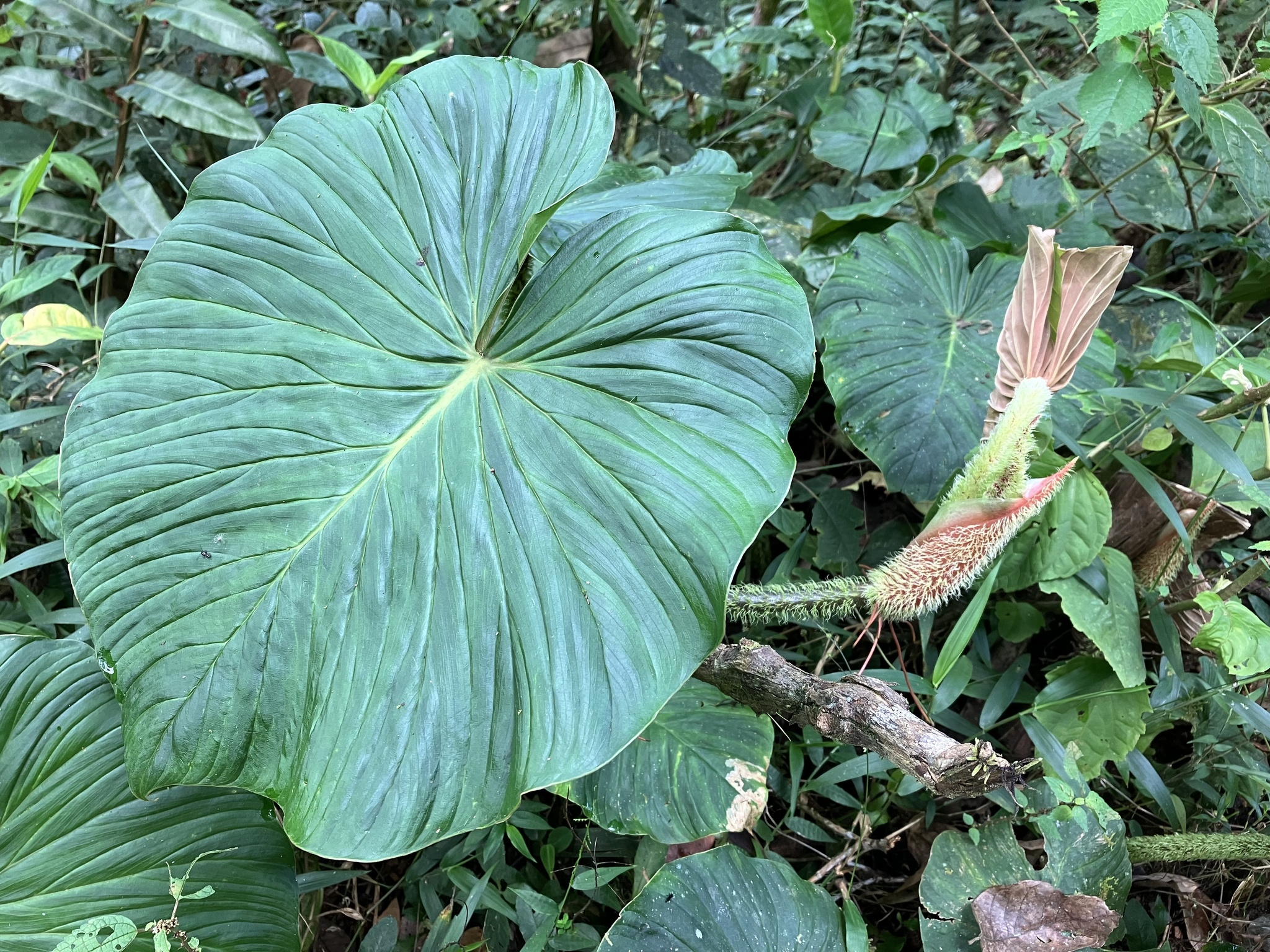
Detail of leaf
