= Cochasquí =

Ancient ruins in Pedro Moncayo Canton, Ecuador

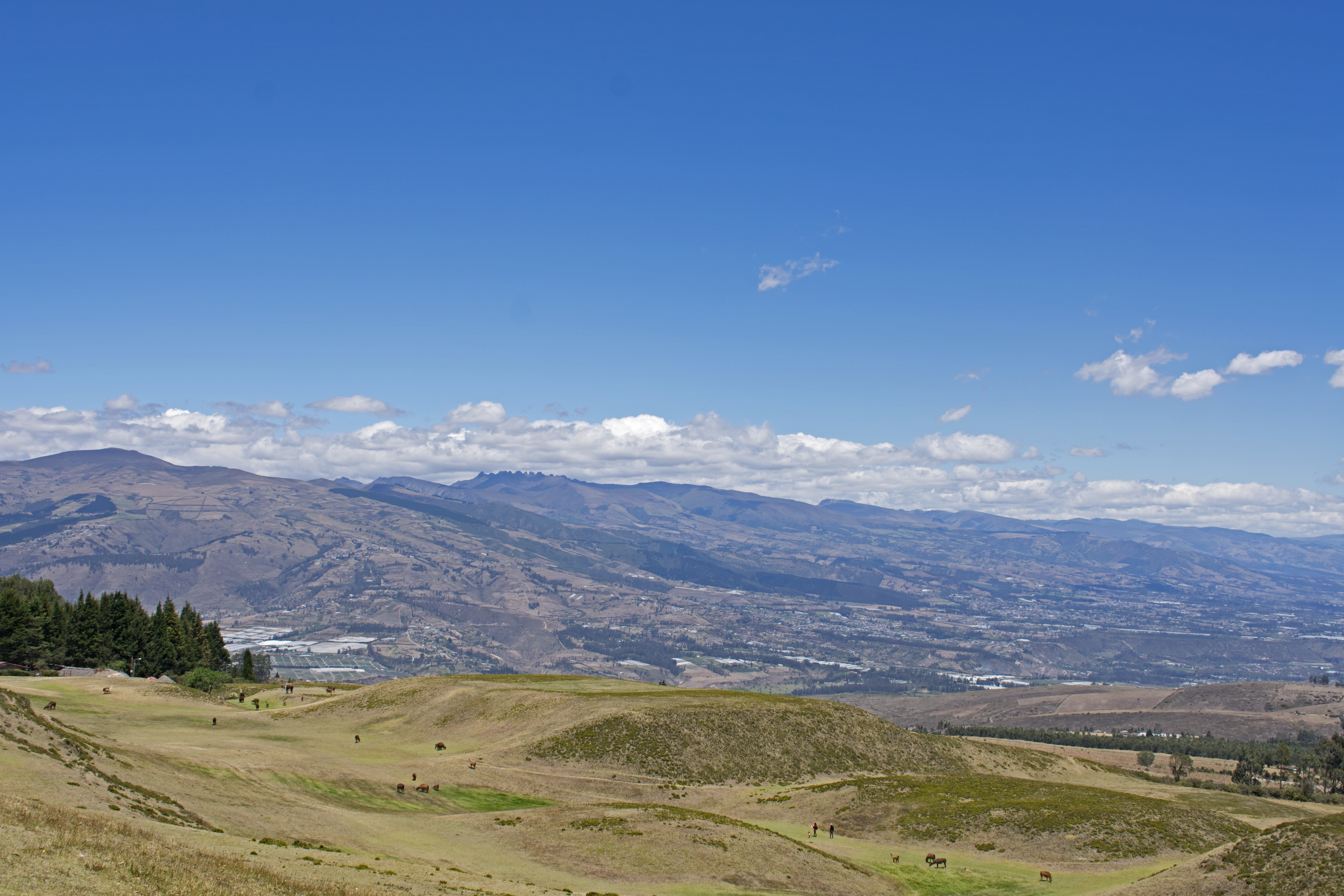

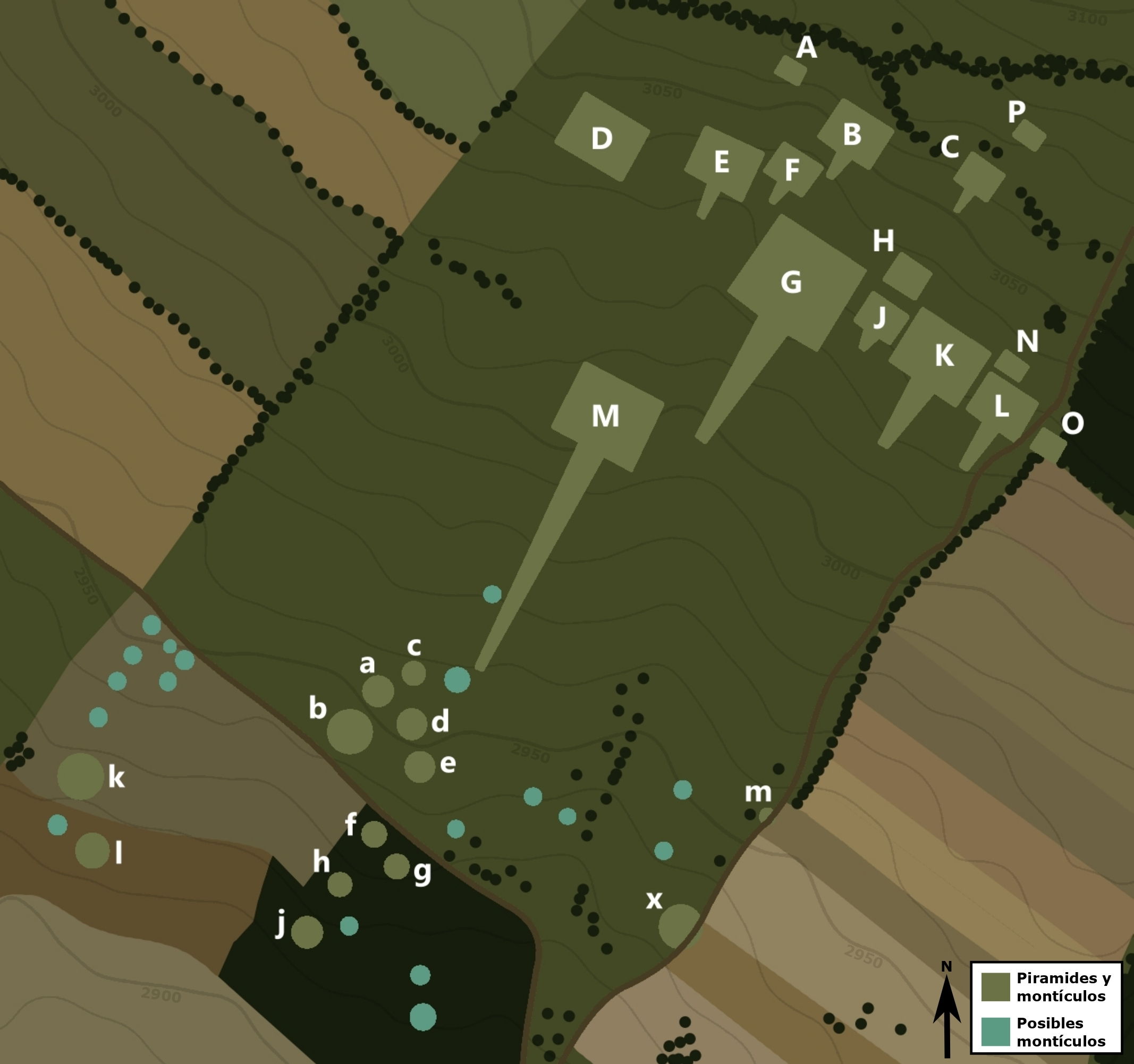

- Location within Ecuador
- 00°03′24″N 78°18′37″W
- Type: Settlement
- Periods: Pre-Columbian era
- Cultures: Caranqui Culture; Incas
- Associated with: Quilago
- Location: Ecuador
- Region: Andean Mountain Range

History
- Built: c. 950-1530 CE

Site notes
- Material: Volcanic Tuff
- Area: 83.9 ha (207 acres)
- Excavation dates: 1932 and 1964-65
- Archaeologists: Max Uhle; Udo Oberem
- Condition: In ruins
- Public access: Yes

Cochasquí is an archaeological site located in the northern Ecuadorian Highlands, in the Pichincha province. It lies in the slopes of mount Mojanda, an inactive volcano, 52 km north of Quito (32 miles), the capital city of Ecuador. The site rests at at 3,040 metres (9,970 ft) above sea level. It is known for its 15 truncated pyramids with access ramps and its at least 15 earthen mounds. It was built by the Caranqui people during the Integration period, between 1250 and 1550 AD. In its heyday, there would have been a big town around the mound complex. This kind of site with monumental truncated pyramids and earthen mounds are common in the northern Ecuadorian highlands, where there are many other known examples dating to the same period. However, Cochasquí is outstanding among them due to their size of its pyramids. It is thought that the pyramids would have been temples used for all kinds of ceremonies. In fact, the site still keeps its ceremonial importance until today, because nearby indigenous communities gather on the site to celebrate major holly days of the Andean cultures, like the Mushak Nina or the Inti Raymi.

== History ==
=== Historical context ===
The society responsible for building Cochasquí is the Caranqui Culture, from the integration period. This society inhabited the northern Ecuadorian highlands, the limits of their territory extended from the Chota river, on the north, to the Guayllabamba river to the south. The Caranqui Culture was heavily agrarian, most of the population lived dispersed through the countryside, in little villages and hamlets. A group of villages formed a chiefdom, which was ruled by a chief or cacique. It is thought that the chiefdom of Cochasquí was one of the most powerful of the Caranqui countries, among others like Otavalo, Cayambe or Caranqui (modern day Ibarra). It is these chiefdoms that oversaw the construction of this kind of monumental complexes of truncated pyramids and earthen mounds. These would have been places for gathering, where the many communities of the chiefdom would come together to celebrate holy days and ceremonies. Maybe these were also the residences for the caciques. For this reason, there are examples of this kind of sites all over the Caranqui countries. Cochasquí is the most famous example, though it is not the biggest of them, that title goes to the Hacienda Zuleta site, where 148 mounds and pyramids have been registered.

=== History of the site ===
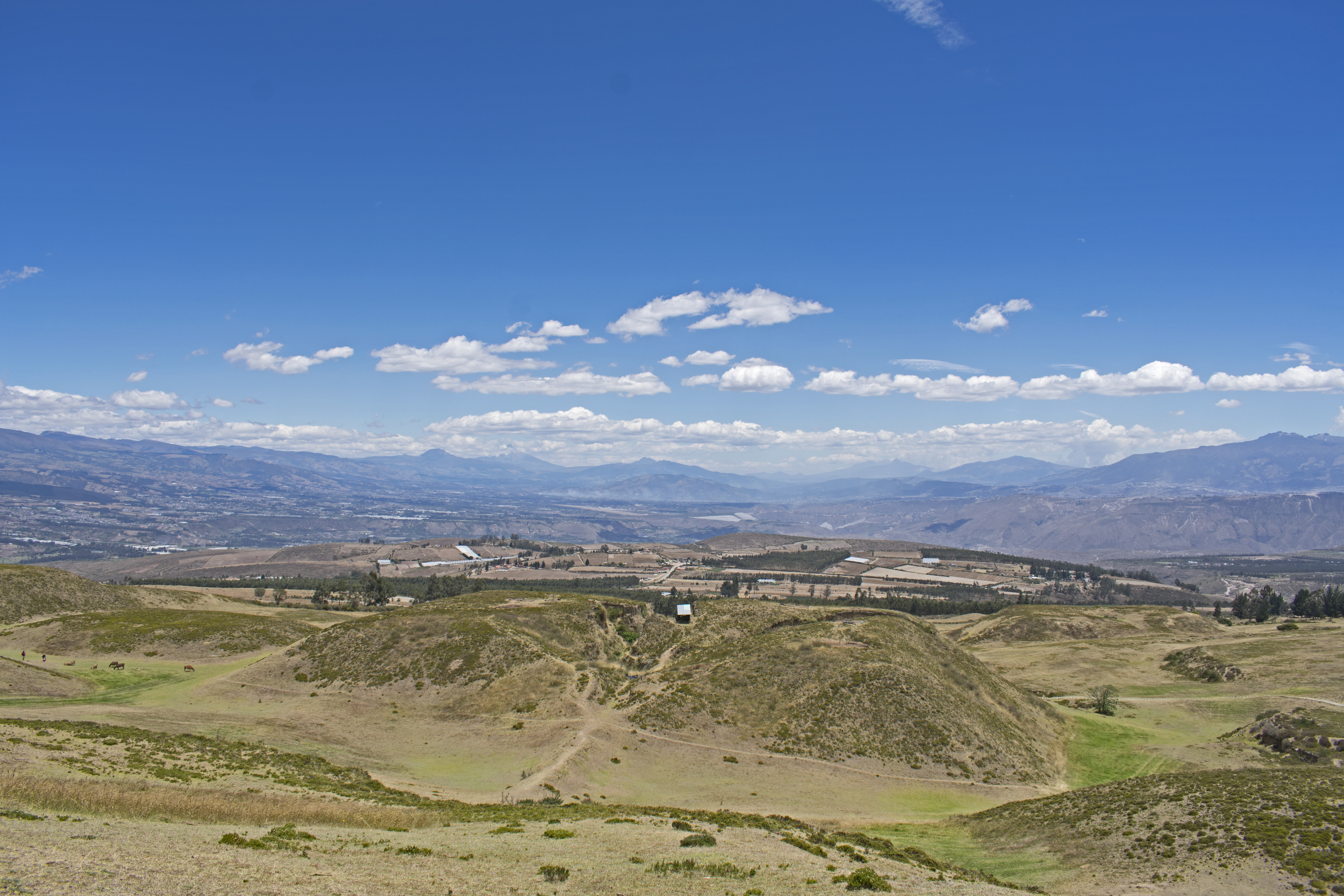
Pyramid "G" seen from the north side. A great hole dug by looters destroyed the center of the monument.

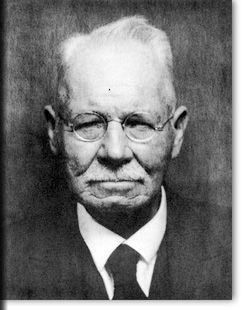
Archaeologist Max Uhle was within the first to study the site of Cohcasquí.

The human occupation of the site began around 950 AD, when the first settlers arrived. Archaeologists recognize first settlers under the name of Cochasquí I phase. None of the mounds or pyramids were built during this phase, their construction began during the next phase, Cochasquí II, which began around 1250, and lasted until 1550 AD. The pyramid building was a long process, they were built at different times, and some of the pyramids were even built in multiple phases, enlarging older and smaller pyramids.

Towards the end of the prehispanic period, the Incas conquered the region. Their influence in Cochasquí has been shown through the finds of Inca pottery in the site. In the incan empire, Cochasquí became an important tambo, which is a way station where travelers of the Inca roads could stop and rest. Some have speculated of the possibility that the native people of Cohcasquí may have been deported to the Cajamarca region, in Peru, under the Inca Mit'a system. And in the same manner, people from Cajamarca may have been brought to Cochasquí.

The first written references mentioning Cochasquí date to 1538 AD, during the period of the Spanish conquest. It seems that back then, the name Cochasquí referred to the entire mountain today known as Mojanda, instead of any specific site. By 1561, Cochasquí became an encomienda, which was assigned to don Antón Diez, who also held the encomiendas of Patate, Píllaro, Tanta and Tulcán. It is known that at this moment, the chief or cacique of Cochasquí was one Alonso Andaparinango. In the decades that followed the assignment of Cochasquí to Mr. Diez, the site was slowly depopulated as people moved to neighboring settlements, like Malchinguí, Tocachi or Cotacachi. In 1655, Cochasquí was transformed into an hacienda or estate, whose majorat was don Manuel Freire. The Freire family owned of the estate until the independence from Spain in the 1800s.

In the 1700s, the French Geodesic Mission arrived in what is now Ecuador, with the objective of measuring the circumference of the earth. They made use of the site as a key point to make astronomic observations. The astronomer Pierre Bouguer said that he made some measurements from the top of one of the truncated pyramids on March 20, 1740.

It was during the republican period that public interest on the site began to develop. In 1932 the first archeological excavation of the site took place, funded by local historian and amateur archaeologist Jacinto Jijón y Caamaño. The person he chose to direct the dig was the renowned German archaeologist Max Uhle. By this moment, Uhle was 76 years old, Cochasquí was the last site that he excavated in Ecuador. When he arrived on the site, pyramid G had been severely destroyed by looters, the great hole left by them can still be seen today.

Between 1964 and 1965, a group of German archeologists from Bonn University decided to continue the excavations started three decades earlier by Max Uhle. They were Roswith Hartmann, Wolfgang W. Wurster, Jürgen Wentscher and the leader of the expedition, Udo Oberem. It is also worth mentioning the participation of the renowned Colombian archaeologist Julio César Cubillos. They became known as the "Grupo Ecuador" of Bonn University.

This renewed interest in the site led to the creation of the Cochasquí Arcaheological Park in 1981.

== Description ==
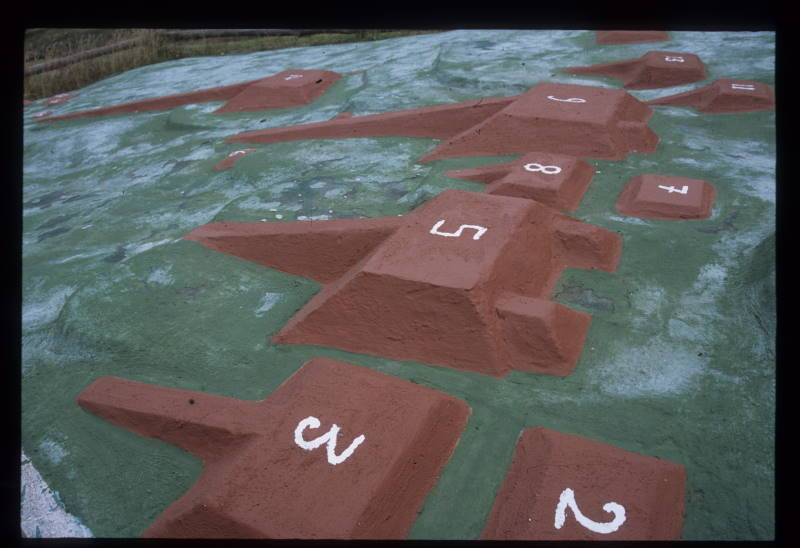
Model of the pyramids

The ruins of Cochasquí have 15 truncated pyramids and multiple earthen mounds. This kind of construction is locally known as tola. It seems like the mounds were built first, and the truncated pyramids were a latter style of construction. These tola mounds were primarily built using dirt and some kind of soft volcanic tuff called Cangahua.

=== Earthen mounds ===
There are around 15 circular mounds towards the south of the pyramids, though it is thought that there were more in the past. Some have been located using aerial pictures. Some of these mounds were graves. In mound "a" for examples, a woman's skeleton was found accompanied by and offering of three vases and seven deformed human skulls. On mound "n", they found a 3 meter deep grave shaft with and offering of multiple vases and a stone mortar, the skeleton of this grave unfortunately did not preserve. However, not all of the mounds were graves, mound "h" and "x" for examples were excavated but no bones or offerings of any kind were found. Contrary to popular belief, no gold or any precious metal has been found in any of these mounds.

=== Truncated pyramids ===
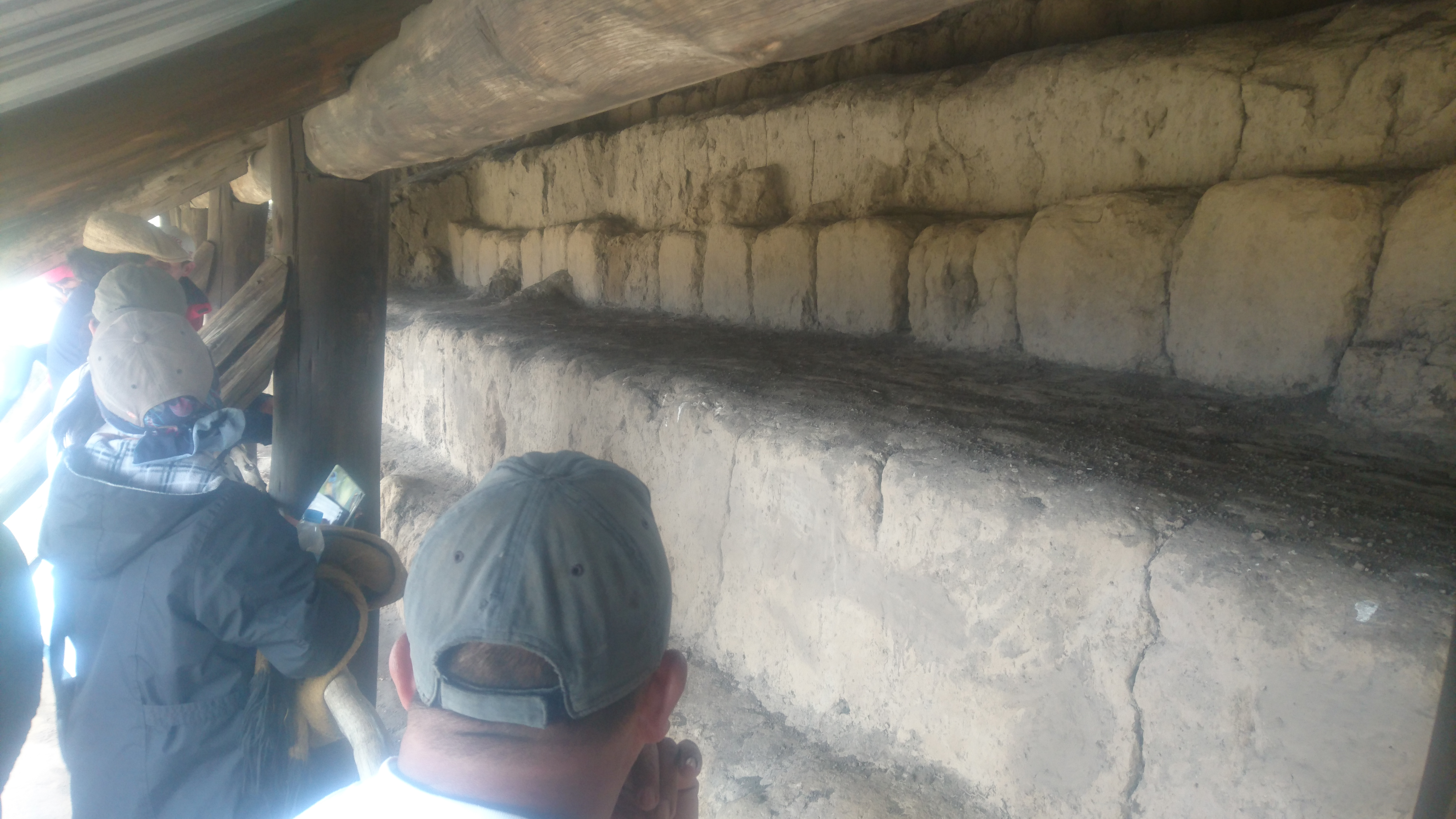
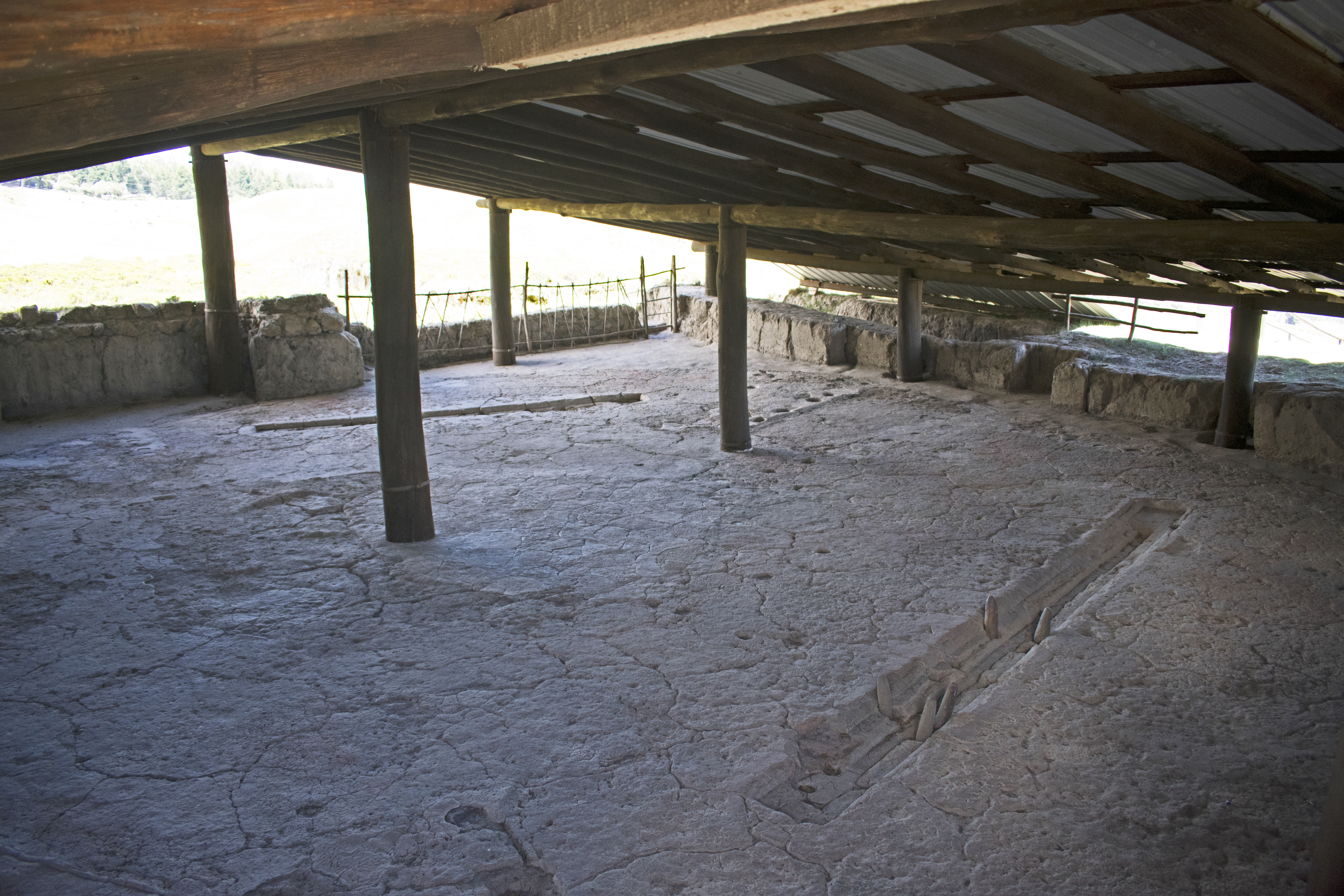
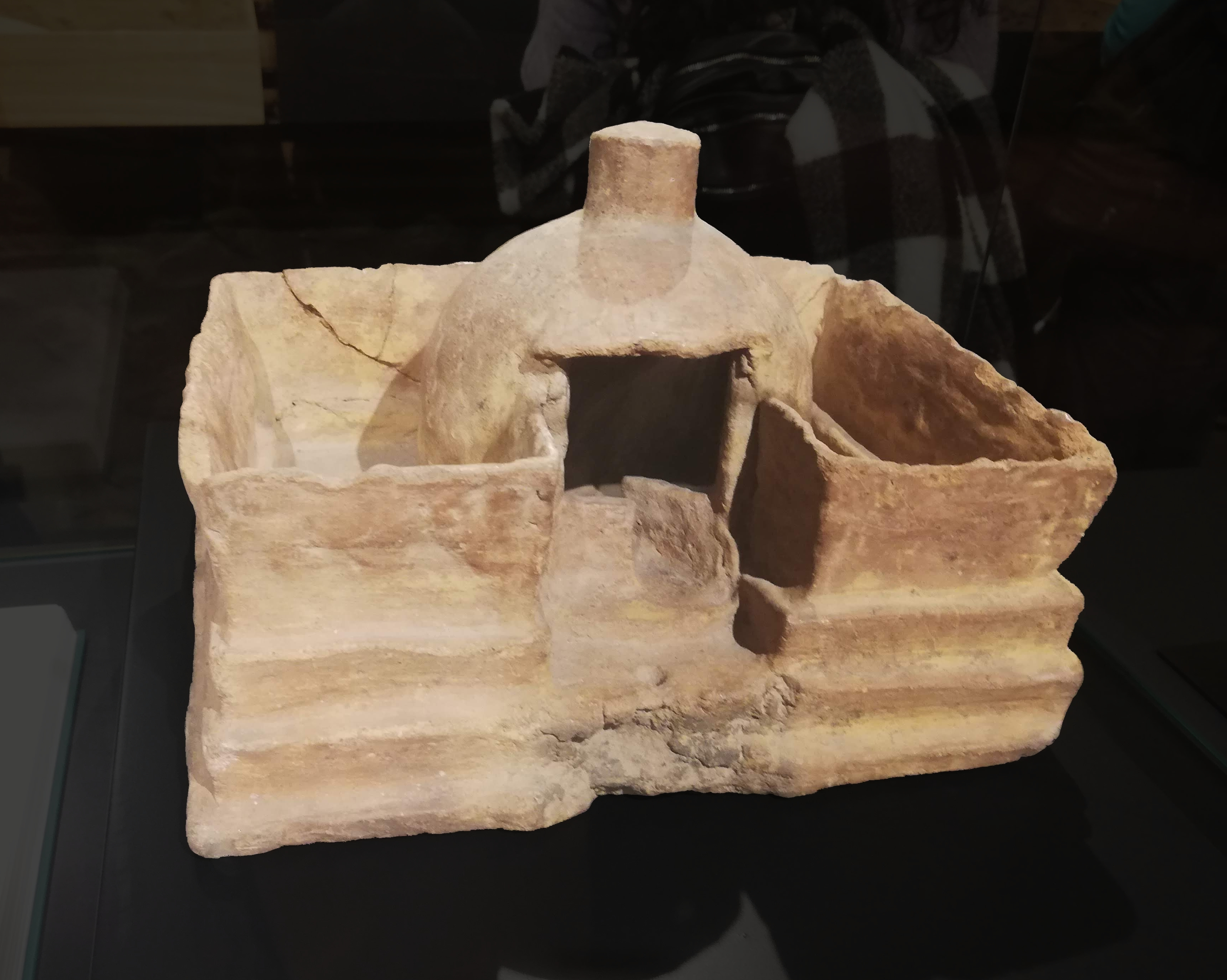
Above: Cangahua blocks lining the side of a pyramid. Centre: Channels on top of pyramid "E". Below: Architectural miniature representing a truncated pyramid.

The so-called truncated pyramids are structures of a rectangular plan. Contrary to common pyramids, these do not have a pointy end, because their slopes are interrupted to form a flat rectangular platform. Nine of the 15 truncated pyramids in Cochasquí have a long ramp that gradually climbs to the top, providing easy access to the platform. These ramps give the pyramids a T shaped plan.

The main building material for the pyramids was dirt, which was used as filling material to stuff the space in between retaining walls built with cangahua. Cangahua is a type of very soft volcanic rock, similar to the volcanic tuff, which is very common in the surroundings of the site. These retaining walls are distributed in a disorderly manner in the interior of the pyramids, and they are composed of rectangular and polygonal blocks. The outer slopes of the pyramids were lined with rows of rectangular cangahua blocks which allowed to keep them at a steep angle of 20° to 35°. The dirt alone would collapse at this angle. However, it looks like these lining blocks were originally not visible, they were covered with a layer of mud.

Excavations in the platform of pyramid "E" found the foundations of two structures, giving us an idea of how the pyramids would have looked when they were in use. These were made up of a mud slab burnt to the brick texture. Only one of the two structure was in a good state of preservation. In its interior there were two carefully excavated channels, oriented at an angle from each other. In one of them there were three embedded conical stones. The functions of these channels is not completely known. Further information from the original appearance of the pyramids can be obtained from a Caranqui miniature model made of clay. This model shows a rounded hut on top of the pyramid (which may correlate to the circular slabs found in pyramid "E") and a wall surrounding the entirety of the platform, opening only in the access through the ramp.

It is thought that these pyramids would have served as temples, where rituals and ceremonies were performed. It is logical to think that these ceremonies would have started with a procession through the ramp for the public to see. But they would have continued privately upon arriving at the top, because the walls would block the view from the outside.

== Importance ==
The Inca assault on Cochasqui probably began at the same time or just after the Inca victory, after a long struggle, at the Pambamarca Fortress Complex, 15 kilometres (9.3 mi) to the southeast. In the opinion of one scholar, Pambamarca fell to the Incas about 1505.

Cochasqui has acquired a symbolic importance in the history of Ecuador. A legend describes the Inca conquest of Cochasqui, including the union of Quilago (born c. 1485), the Queen of Cochasqui and the Inca Emperor, Huayna Capac. For a two-year period, the Incas were unable to defeat the armies of Quilago. Finally overcome, Quilago was taken captive and forced to marry Huayna Capac. In some accounts, the offspring of this union was the future emperor Atahualpa.

Quilago prepared a trap to murder Huayna Capac in her bedchamber, but was betrayed by her servants and executed. The defeat of Quilago enabled the Inca to extend their conquests to northernmost Ecuador, defeating the Caranqui in the battle of Yawarkucha.

This legend has deep roots in Ecuador. A Spanish chronicler described a performance in Quito in 1613 portraying the struggle between the Inca invader and Cochasqui and the relationship between the Inca Emperor and the warrior queen. The legend explains the national origin of Ecuador as a union between the conquering Incas and the Ecuadorian Indians who struggled against foreign domination and repression, first against the Incas and later against the Spanish. Cochasqui is an important place for ceremonies, traditional dances, shamanistic rituals, and marriages with the emphasis on getting in touch with the ancestry of the modern-day country of Ecuador.
