= Tabacundo =

- Town
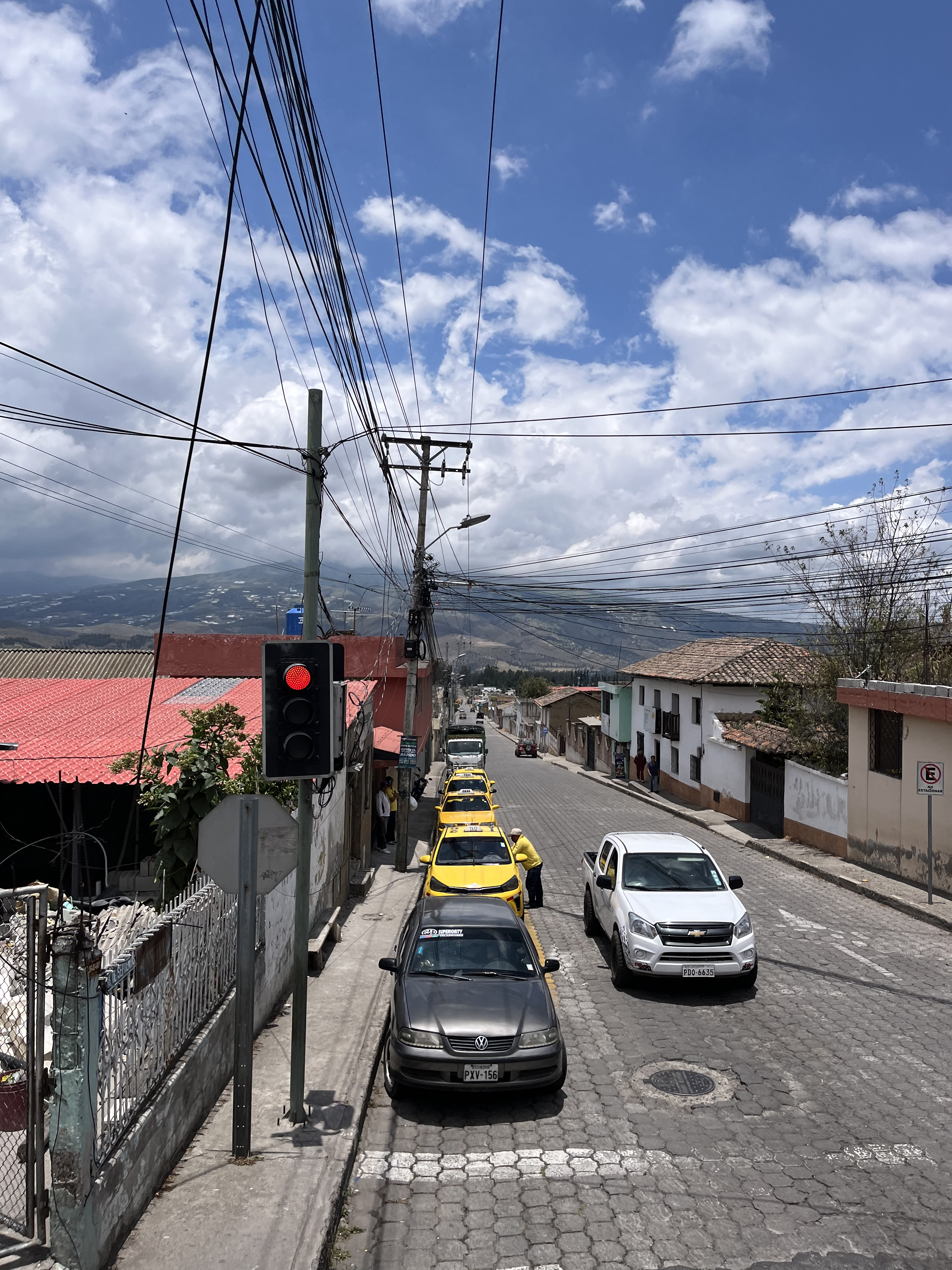

- Flag

- Location within Ecuador
- Coordinates: 0°03′N 78°12′W
- Country: Ecuador
- Province: Pichincha
- Canton: Pedro Moncayo
- Creation of the municipality: 1911-09-26
- Urban parishes: Tabacundo

Area
  - Town: 3.08 km^{2} (1.19 sq mi)

Population (2022 census)
  - Town: 13,019
  - Density: 4,230/km^{2} (10,900/sq mi)
- Demonym(s): Tabacundeño, -a
- Time zone: UTC-5 (ECT)
- Postal code: EC1704 (new format), P04 (old format)
- Area code: 593 2
- Climate: Csb
- Website: http://www.pedromoncayo.gov.ec

Tabacundo is the seat of Pedro Moncayo Canton, Pichincha Province, Ecuador. Tabacundo is located on the southeastern foothills of Mojanda Volcano northeast of the city of Quito and west of the city of Cayambe.
