= Pedro Moncayo =

Ecuadorian journalist and politician

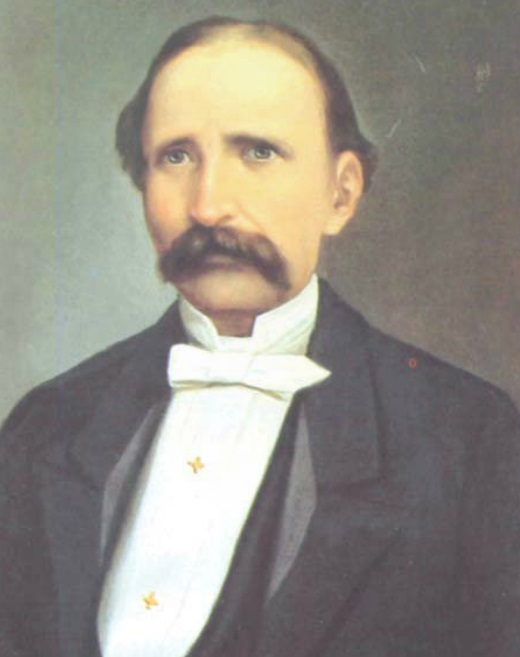
Ecuadorian journalist and politician Pedro Moncayo

Pedro Moncayo y Esparza (29 June 1807 in Ibarra, Ecuador — February 1888 in Valparaíso, Chile) was an Ecuadorian journalist and politician. He was the son of an Ecuadorian mother and Colombian father. He was politically active during the period of Caudillismo of Ecuador, being an opponent of the caudillos, writing for the weekly newspaper El Quiteño Libre. He later became diplomatically active and was ambassador to Peru, France and the United Kingdom. He lived the remainder of his life in Chile, dying in Valparaíso.

Pedro Moncayo Canton in Pichincha Province is named after him.

== Political life ==
In 1847 he was a member of the Chamber of Deputies of his country and edited a new newspaper entitled El Progresista. He was a member of several constituent congresses of Ecuador and participated in the conventions of Cuenca and Guayaquil. In the administrative domain, Moncayo was in charge of Ecuador's affairs in France, as well as being minister plenipotentiary to Peru, specifically charged with settling the border issue between the two countries.

== Legacy ==
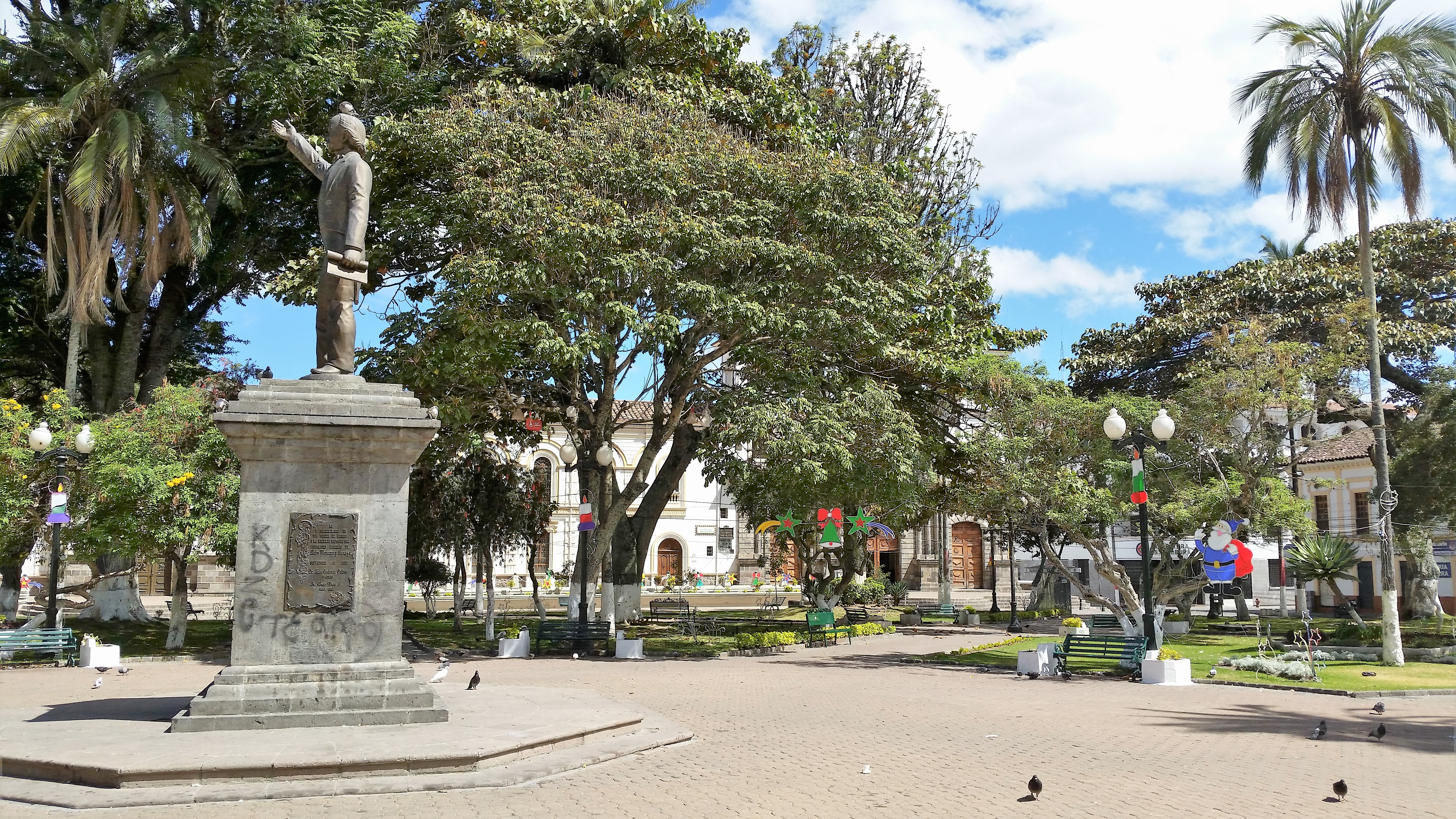
Pedro Moncayo Central Park, Ibarra

He was compared to Juan Montalvo as one of the great liberal politicians of the 19th century—the former focusing on literature first and politics second; the latter on politics first, and literature subsequently. Furthermore, alongside Pedro Carbo, he was one of the principal political opponents of Gabriel García Moreno. His writings, his prestige, and his political influence played a pivotal role in helping to bring an end to *Garcianismo*—as this era in Ecuador's political history came to be known. For this reason, he belongs to the second generation of great Ecuadorian politicians—those born after the heroes of independence had passed from the scene. A book was dedicated to his memory titled "La vida de don Pedro Moncayo", (The Life of Don Pedro Moncayo), which summarizes his legacy.

== Works ==
He published three major books during his lifetime, starting with *Ojeada sobre las Repúblicas Sudamericanas* (A Glance at the South American Republics), in which he analyzes Venezuela, Colombia, Ecuador, Peru, and Bolivia. In this essay, he displays his knowledge of philosophy, politics, and history—adopting a format, he would maintain in his subsequent publications. A year later, he wrote *Colombia y El Brasil, Colombia y El Perú* (Colombia and Brazil, Colombia and Peru), likewise analyzing the history and geography of these nations, with a particular focus on the border disputes that arose following independence. . However, his most significant work is undoubtedly *El Ecuador de 1825 a 1875: sus hombres, sus instituciones y sus leyes* (Ecuador from 1825 to 1875: Its Men, Institutions, and Laws), which stands as one of the most important publications regarding 19th-century Ecuadorian history.
