= Puerto Quito =

Coordinates: 0.12720°N 79.253139°W

Quito
- Town and urban parish
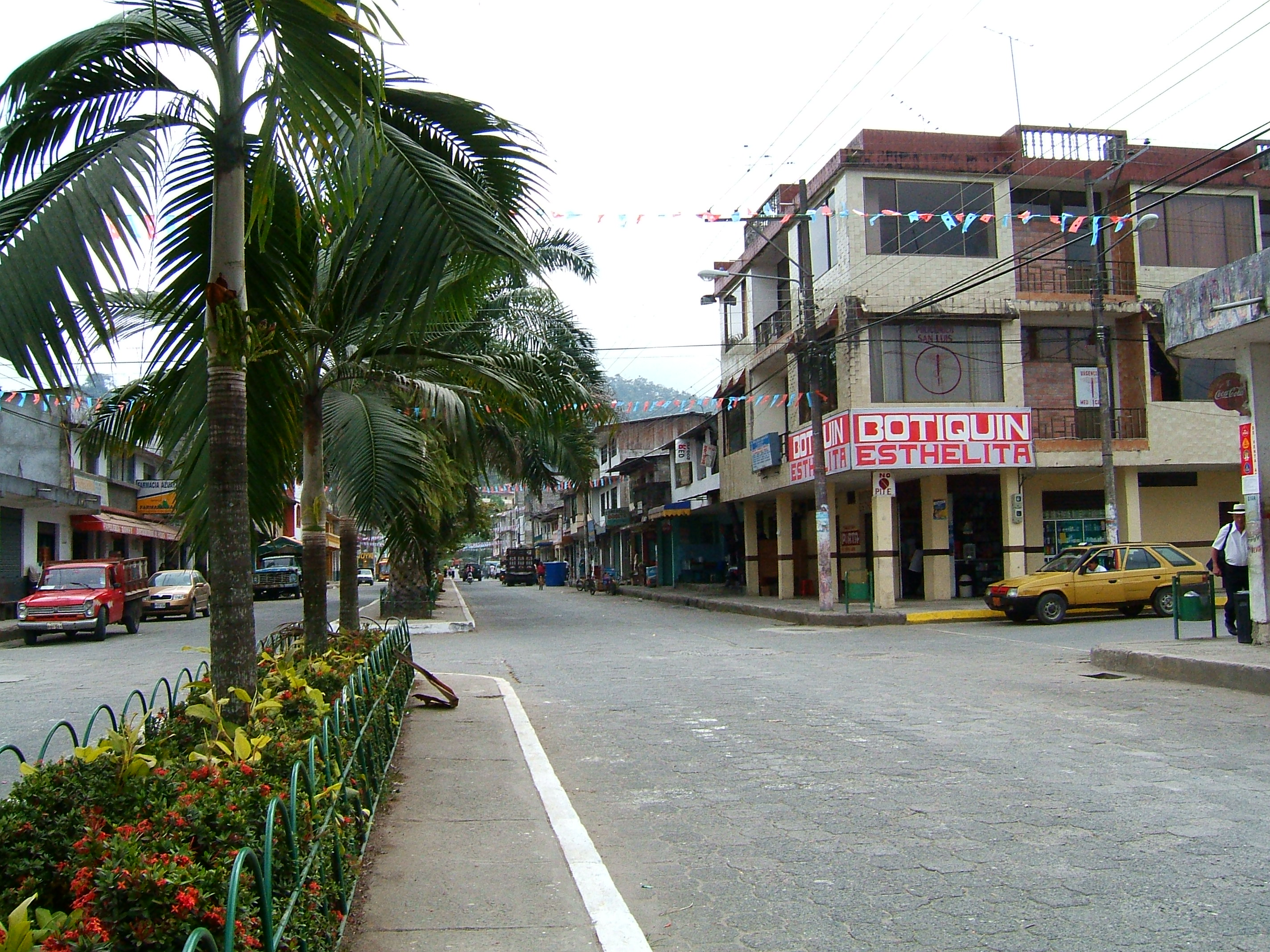
- Interactive map of Quito
- Country: Ecuador
- Province: Pichincha
- Canton: Puerto Quito
- Settled: 1965
- Established: April 1, 1996

Government
  - Mayor: Narciza Párraga de Monar

Area
  - Town: 1.51 km^{2} (0.58 sq mi)
  - Parish: 695.6 km^{2} (268.6 sq mi)
- Highest elevation: 160 m (520 ft)
- Lowest elevation: 120 m (390 ft)

Population (2022 census)
  - Town: 3,833
  - Density: 2,540/km^{2} (6,570/sq mi)
  - Parish: 25,067
  - Parish density: 36.04/km^{2} (93.33/sq mi)
- Time zone: UTC-5 (ECT)
- Postal Code: EC170950
- Climate: Am
- Website: http://www.puertoquito.gov.ec/

Puerto Quito is a town and urban parish in the province of Pichincha, Ecuador. It is a developing area for ecotourism, with an abundance of wildlife, secondary jungle and waterfalls such as the Cascada Azul (Blue Waterfall). It is beside a major bridge over the river Caoní on the main road from Quito to the coast. By road, Quito is 140 km away, or 3.5 hours by bus.

Although geographically part of the Sierra region of Ecuador, Puerto Quito's climate and geography is closer to that of the coastal region. It is in the tropical forest of Ecuador. As such, it has a higher temperature than the rest of the province, averaging around 25 degrees Celsius year-round. Average rainfall is between one and two meters a year.
