= Santa Lucia Cloud Forest =

- Location: El Bosque Nublado Lodge, Santa Lucia
- Nearest city: Quito, Ecuador

Santa Lucia Cloud Forest (Spanish: Bosque Nublado Santa Lucía) is a cloud forest reserve, located about 80 km northwest of Quito, in the province of Pichincha, in Ecuador. This is at the far south of the southern phase of the Choco-Andean Rainforest Corridor. Rainforest Concern works with the Santa Lucia co-operative, a community-based conservation organisation dedicated to conservation and to sustainable development so that they can make a modest living whilst conserving their remaining cloud forest.

The community owns over 5 km^{2} (1,200 acres) of montane cloud forest, of which about 80% is still in its prime, virgin state and the area has now been declared part of a Bosque Protector (Protected Forest). The community-based organisation formed by local campesino families manage their own resources and they have three basic aims:

- to conserve and protect the cloud forest belonging to member families.
- to develop sustainable sources of income for the members of Santa Lucía.
- to benefit directly or indirectly the residents in neighboring areas.
