= El Quiteño Libre =

Ecuadorian newspaper

- Type: Weekly newspaper
- Owner: Sociedad del Quiteño Libre
- Founded: 1833
- Ceased publication: 1833
- Language: Spanish
- Headquarters: Quito, Ecuador

El Quiteño Libre was a weekly newspaper from the city of Quito, Ecuador, in 1833. The newspaper was founded by political opponents of president Juan José Flores. One of the writers for the newspaper was politician Pedro Moncayo.
