= Los Bancos Canton =

Coordinates: 0°13′S 78°31′W

Los Bancos
- Canton
- San Miguel de los Bancos
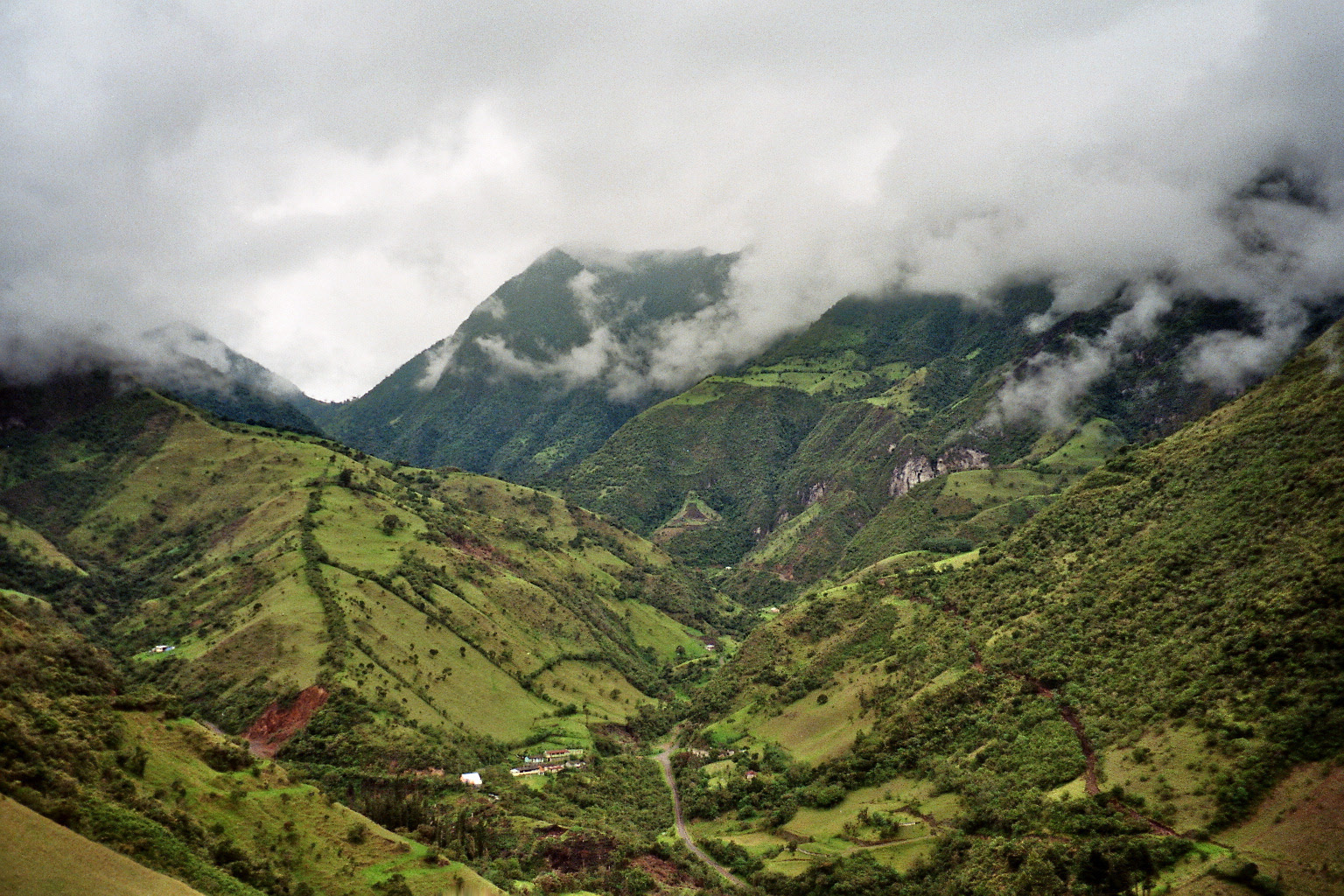
- Cloud forest near Mindo

- Flag

- Location of Pichincha Province in Ecuador.

- Los Bancos Canton in Pichincha Province
- Country: Ecuador
- Province: Pichincha
- Established: February 14, 1991
- Named for: Archangel Michael
- Seat: San Miguel de los Bancos

Government
  - Mayor: Ab. Marco Calle Avila

Area
  - Total: 801 km^{2} (309 sq mi)
- Elevation: 1,100 m (3,600 ft)

Population (2001 Census)
  - Total: 10,717
- Time zone: UTC-5 (ECT)

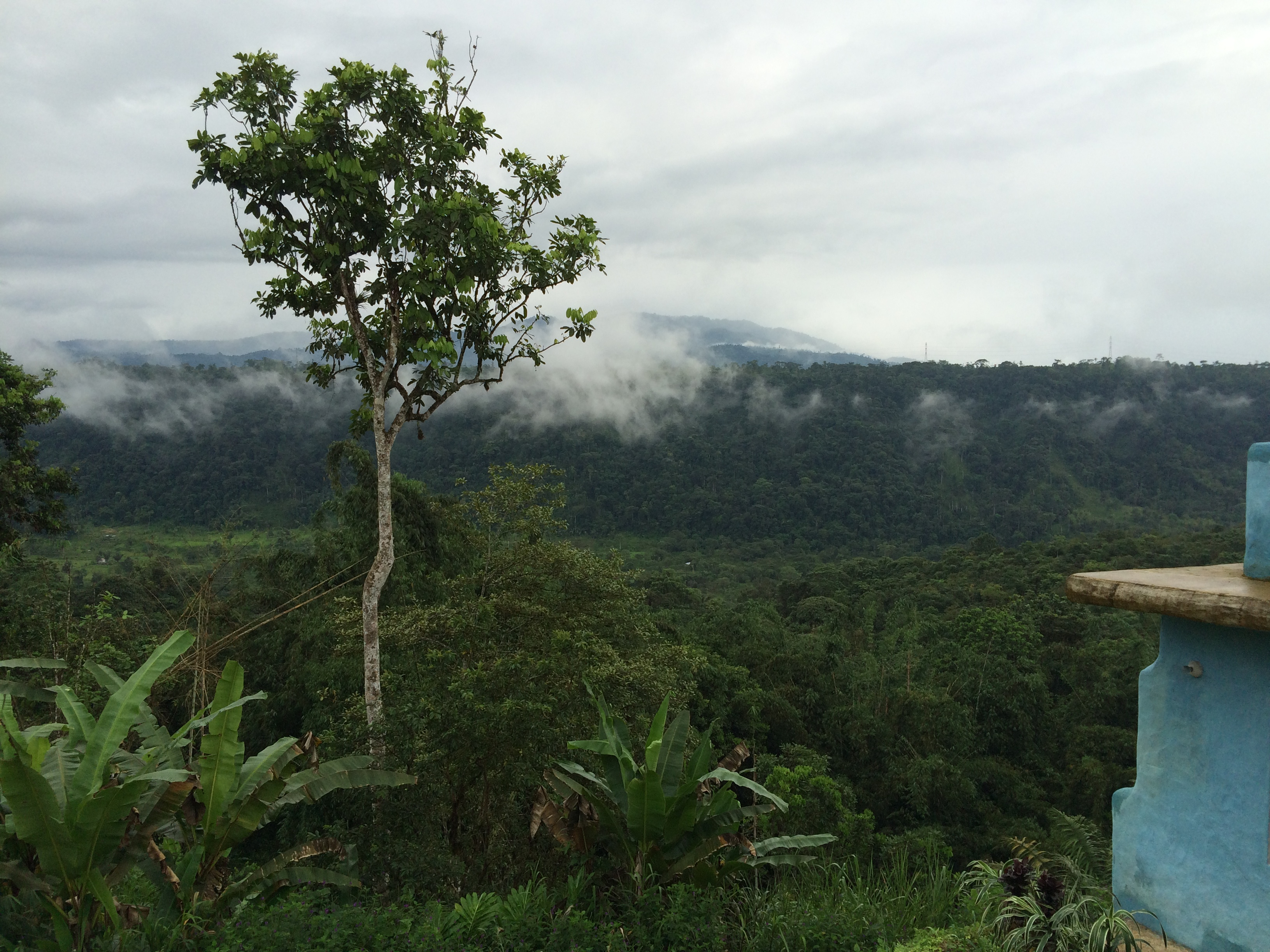
A few from hostel "Charm" of San Miguel de los Bancos

San Miguel de los Bancos, or simply Los Bancos, is a canton in the province of Pichincha, Ecuador. The long name of the town refers to dedication of the area to the archangel Michael. Local tradition attributes the "Los Bancos" part of the name to the use of tree trunks as benches at the junction of the through road from Quito to Esmeraldas with the road into the Rio Blanco valley.

== Geography ==
The canton is in the Guayllabamba river basin, which, in turn, is part of the river basin of the Esmeraldas river, which flows into the Pacific Ocean. The climate of the canton is subtropical because of its mid-high elevation, as opposed to the climate of higher elevation in the province between the Western and Central Cordilleras, which enclose the highlands of the Ecuadorian Andes.

== Political divisions ==
The canton is divided into two parishes: the urban parish San Miguel de los Bancos and the rural parish Mindo.

== Economy ==
As with other cantons in the province of Pichincha, Los Bancos' economy is mainly agricultural, based especially on cattle-raising. Recently, there has been considerable growth in eco-tourism, most notably at Mindo.
