= Puerto Quito Canton =

Coordinates: 0°13′S 78°31′W

Puerto Quito
- Canton
- Flag

- Location of Pichincha Province in Ecuador.

- Puerto Quito Canton in Pichincha Province
- Country: Ecuador
- Province: Pichincha
- Settled: 1965
- Established: April 1, 1996
- Seat: Puerto Quito

Government
  - Mayor: Narciza Párraga de Monar

Area approx.
  - Total: 695.6 km^{2} (268.6 sq mi)
- Highest elevation: 160 m (520 ft)
- Lowest elevation: 120 m (390 ft)

Population (2022 census)
  - Total: 25,067
  - Density: 36.04/km^{2} (93.33/sq mi)
- Time zone: UTC-5 (ECT)
- Website: http://www.puertoquito.gov.ec/

Puerto Quito is a canton in Pichincha Province, Ecuador. It has only one parish, the urban parish of Puerto Quito, which is also the seat of the canton.
