= Mindo, Ecuador =

Mindo
- Rural area
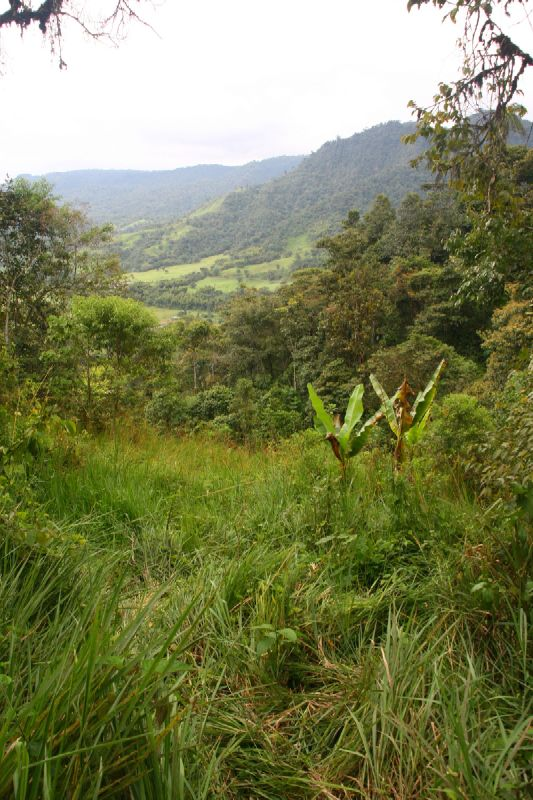
- Cloud forest and grassland near Mindo

- Location within Ecuador
- Coordinates: 0°03′04.29″S 78°46′41.89″W
- Country: Ecuador
- Province: Pichincha
- Cantons: San Miguel de Los Bancos

Government
  - Type: Paroquial Junta
  - President: Miguel Patiño
- Time zone: UTC-5 (ECT)
- Postal Code: EC170751

Mindo (also known as the Mindo Valley) is a mountainous watershed in the western slopes of the Andes, where two of the most biologically diverse ecoregions in the world meet: the Chocoan lowlands and the Tropical Andes. In this transitional area — which covers an area of 268 square kilometers (103 sq mi) and ranges from 960–3,440 metres (3,150–11,290 ft) above sea level — three rivers (Mindo, Saloya and Cinto) and hundreds of streams irrigate the landscape, which is a patchwork of cloud forests, secondary forests, agricultural land, and human settlements.

Politically, Mindo is a collection of rural parishes (Gualea, Nanegal, Nanegalito, Pacto) that make up the Noroccidental Administrative Zone of Quito Canton, and parts of Los Bancos Canton within Pichincha Province in the northern sierra region of Ecuador.

== Tourism ==
The Mindo Valley is among the most heavily visited tourist locations in Ecuador. Mindo was recently named the Ruta de Cacao by The Ecuadorian Ministerio de Turismo. Nearly 200,000 tourists visit the area annually to enjoy activities such as rafting, tubing, trekking, mountain biking, canyoning, horseback riding, birdwatching, and chocolate making. Besides its well-developed tourism infrastructure, it offers several private reserves and lodges known for their montane forests, waterfalls and unique cloud forest biodiversity. Much of the land is privately protected, and an additional 86 square kilometers (33 sq mi) falls within the Mindo-Nambillo Ecological Reserve (Spanish: Bosque Protector Mindo Nambillo).

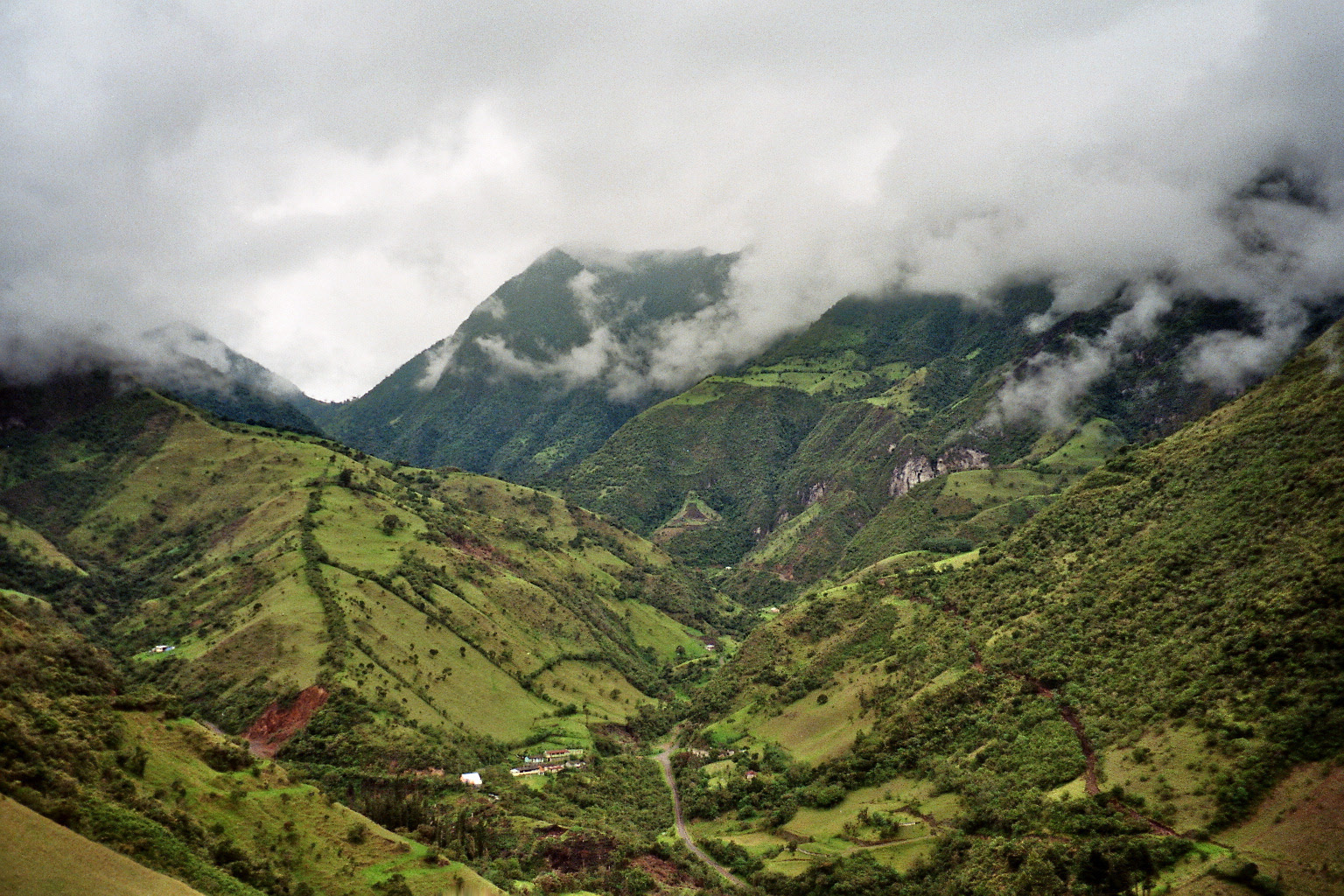
Landscape in Mindo

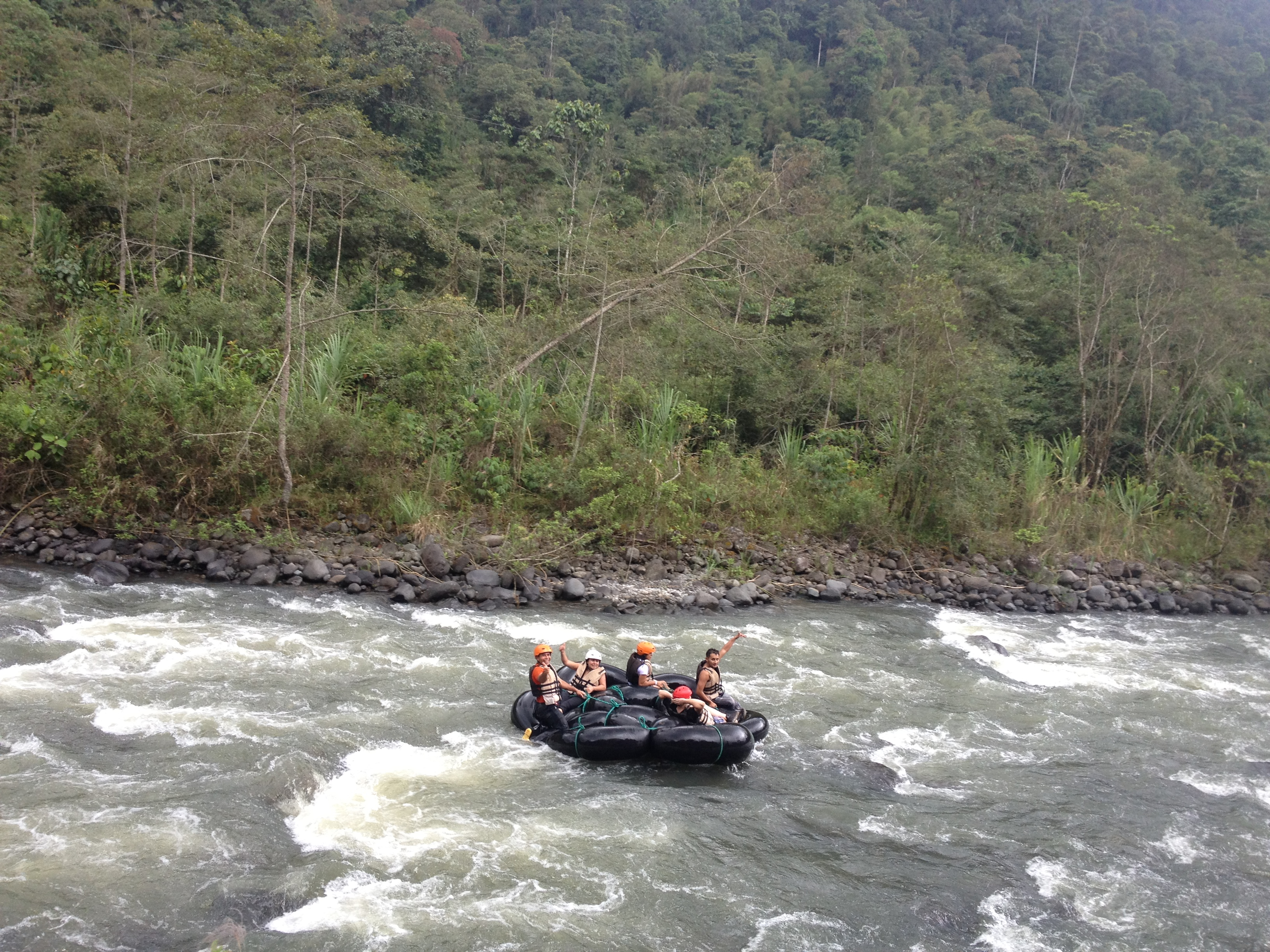
Tubing in Mindo

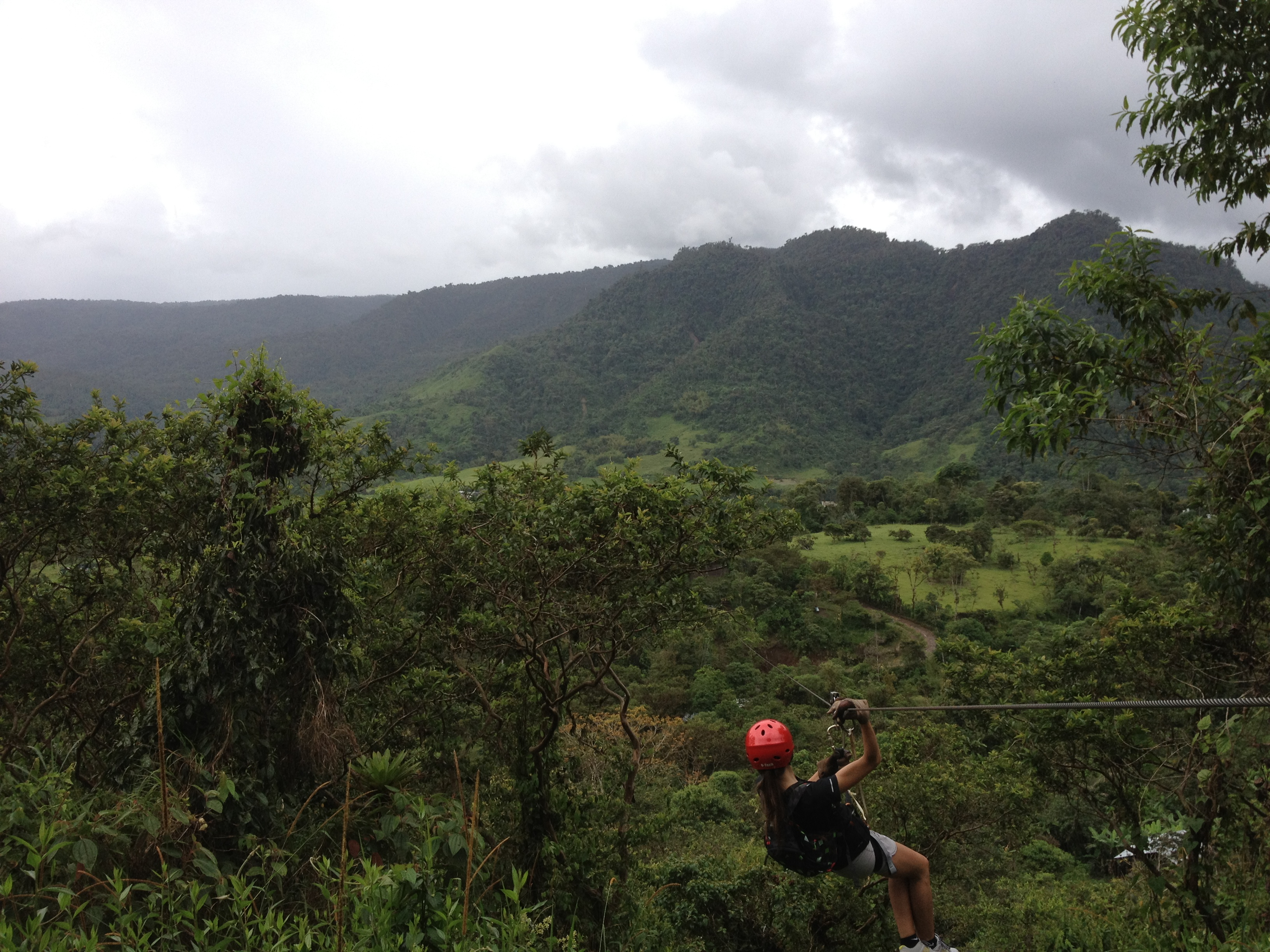
Zip lining

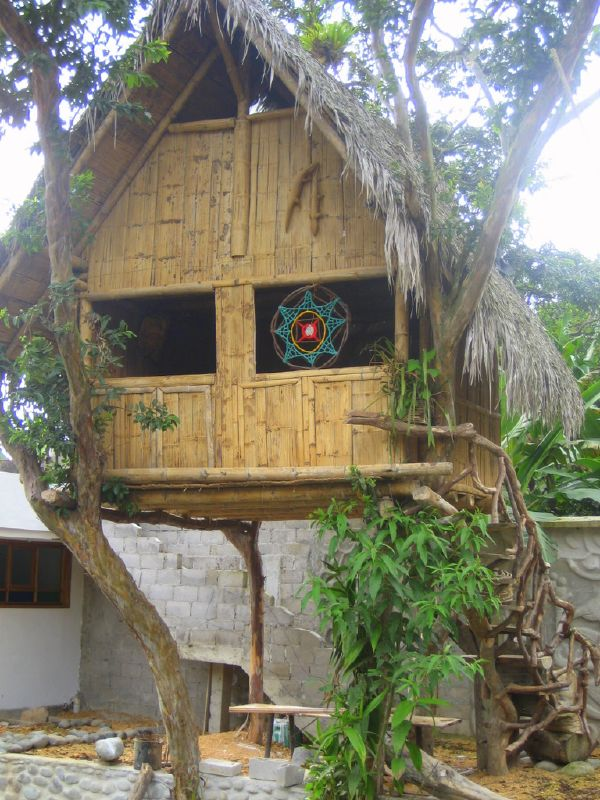
A bamboo and palm thatch house in Mindo

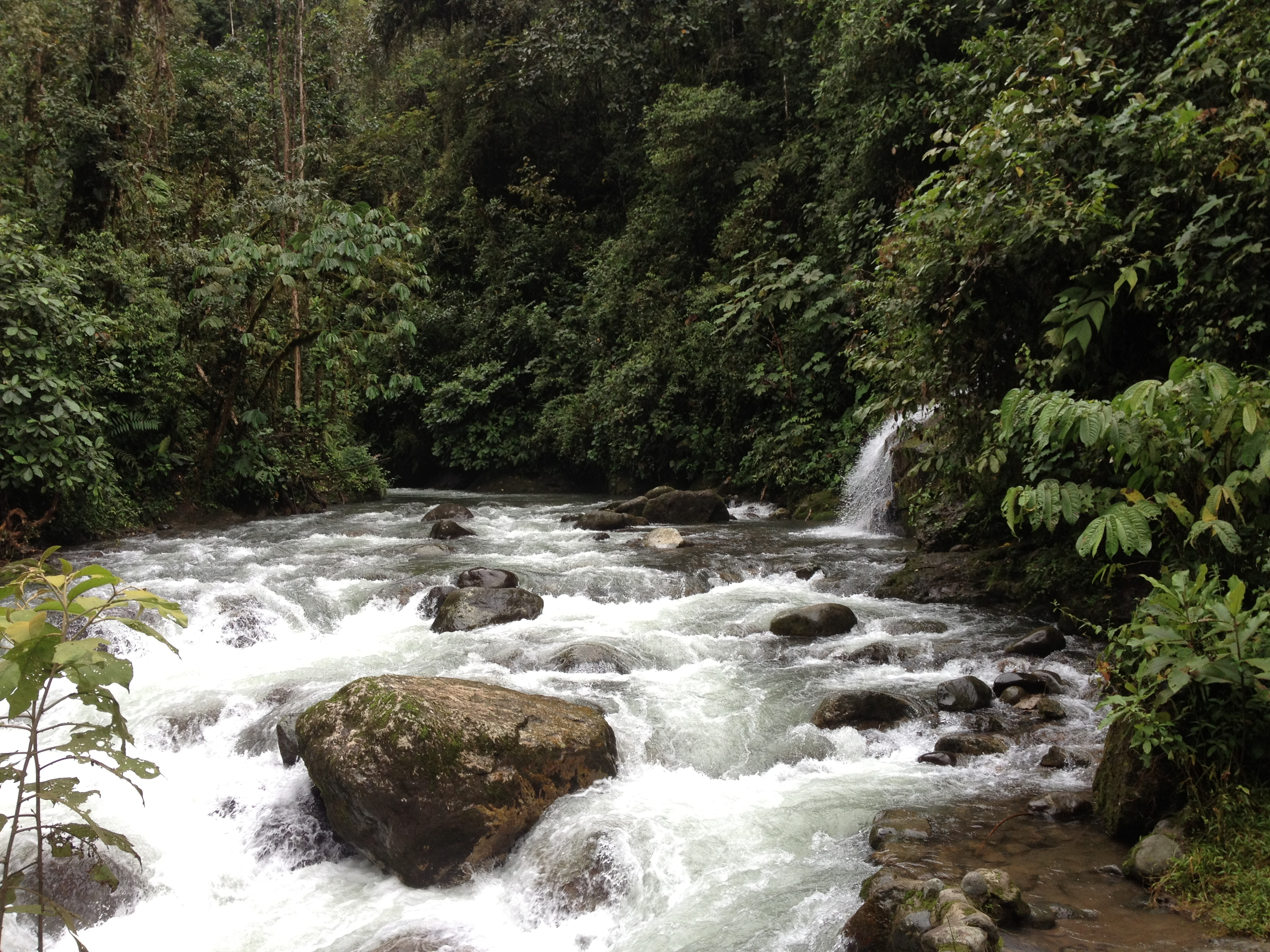
Waterfall in the Mindo-Nambillo
