= Frank Salamone =

American anthropologist and sociologist

Frank A. Salamone (born 1939) is an American anthropologist and sociologist whose work has focused on Italian-Americans living in New York and on the peoples of various African nations, including Nigeria and Sudan. He is Professor Emeritus at Iona College.

== Early life ==
Salamone was born in 1939 in Rochester, New York. He began his academic career at St. John Fisher College, where he earned his bachelor's in 1961. In 1966, he earned his Master's from the University of Rochester. In 1973, upon the invitation of then-head of the American Anthropological Association, Dr. Charles Frantz, Salamone matriculated to the State University of New York (SUNY) Buffalo, earning his PhD in 1973.

== Career ==
In the mid-1970s, Salamone had begun his work studying various ethnic groups in Nigeria, publishing The Drug Problem in a Small Emirate in Northern Nigeria in the Journal des Africanistes in 1975. Salamone's article examined drug use among the Yauri people, inhabitants of the Yauri emirate in northwestern Sudan. This was followed by a study of the Hausa people, Becoming Hausa: Ethnic Identity Change and its Implications for the Study of Ethnic Pluralism and Stratification, published in the October 1975 issue of Cambridge University Press' Africa.

By 1985, Salamone had become the Chair of the Social Sciences Department at Elizabeth Seton College in Yonkers, New York. While at Elizabeth Seton, he continued his work on western Africa, publishing Colonialism and the Emergence of Fulani Identity in the Journal of African and Asian Studies in 1985.

In 1988, Salamone's employer, Elizabeth Seton College, merged with Iona College, and Salamone went on to become chair of Iona's Sociology and Anthropology Department. Salamone eventually earned the title of professor emeritus at Iona College.

In 1993, Salamone retired from Iona College but remained in academia, serving as an online facilitator for the University of Phoenix for 16 years. In 2008, he explored a new cultural area with his examination of Italian-Americans living in Rochester in the postwar years. Salamone's work, Italians in Rochester, 1940-1960, touched on anthropological, sociological, and historical themes.

== Personal life ==
Salamone resides in Rochester, New York with his wife, Virginia O'Sullivan Salamone. He has seven children.
