= Mojanda =

Inactive stratovolcano in northern Ecuador

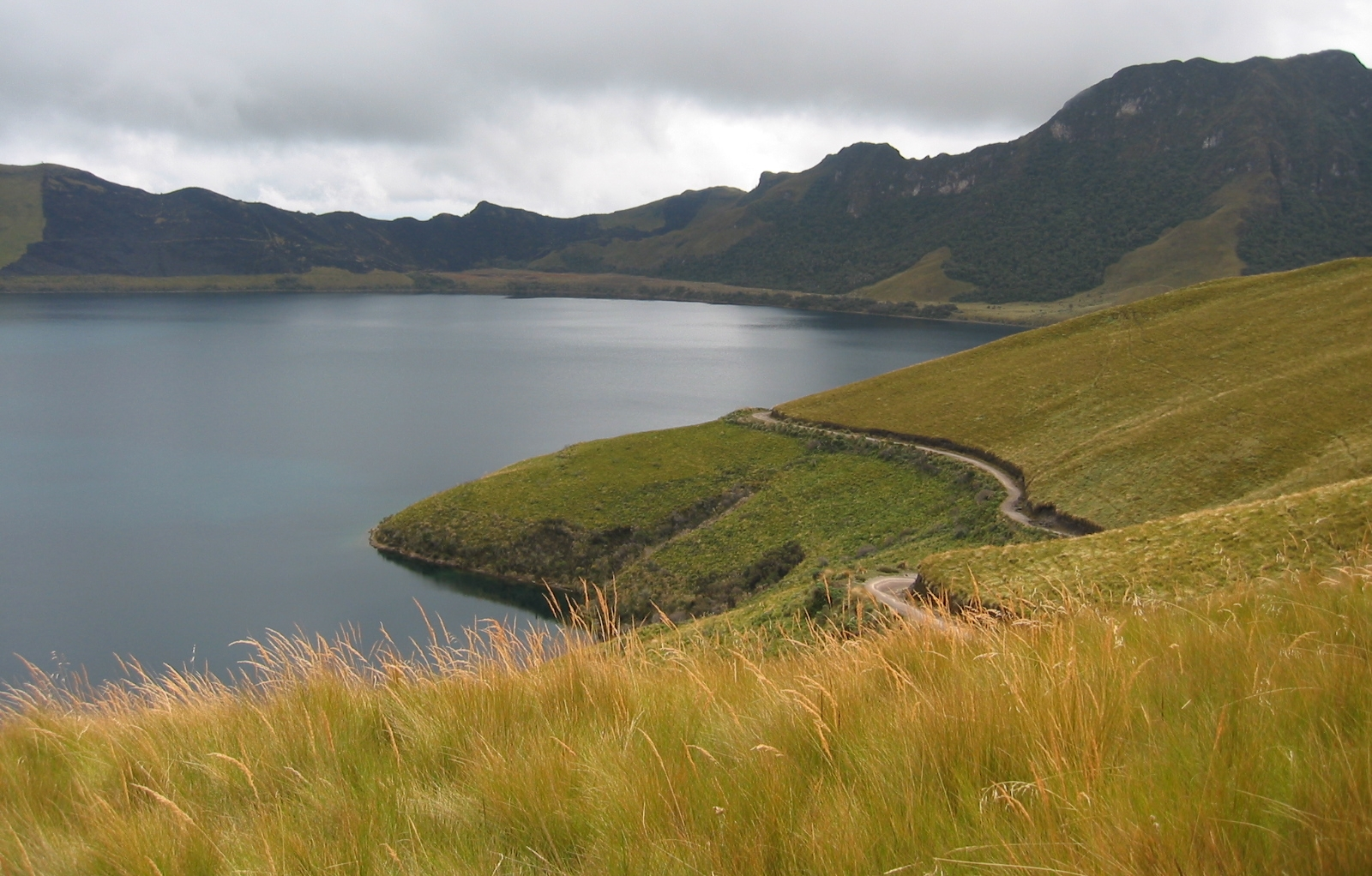
- Caricocha in the Mojanda caldera. On the opposite side of lake, the páramo has been burned away to promote new growth for cattle grazing.

Highest point
- Elevation: 4,263 m (13,986 ft)
- Coordinates: 0.13°N 78.27°W

Geography
- Location: Between Imbabura Province and Pichincha Province, Ecuador
- Parent range: Andes

Geology
- Mountain type: Inactive stratovolcano
- Last eruption: Possible in the holocene

Mojanda is an inactive stratovolcano of the Eastern Cordillera of the Andes in northern Ecuador. A summit caldera, which was produced by an explosive Plinian Eruption that marked the end of Mojanda activity 200,000 years ago, is occupied by three crater lakes: Karikucha (the largest), Yanakucha, and Warmikucha. Having received protected status in 2002, they are a popular tourist destination and are about 20 minutes taxi ride from the largely indigenous town of Otavalo.

Mojanda is a complex of two volcanoes which were active simultaneously. The volcanic vents are only 3 km apart. The other volcano, which produced at least two Plinian Eruptions of its own, is known as Fuya Fuya. Fuya Fuya partially collapsed around 165,000 years ago, creating a large caldera to the west. A new volcanic cone and other lava domes subsequently extruded inside the caldera, probably during the Late PleistoceneThe youngest domes were not glaciated and are possibly from the Holocene.

The high altitude grasslands and shrublands of Mojanda, which lie above the cloud forests, are collectively known as páramo. They are frequently grazed by cattle.

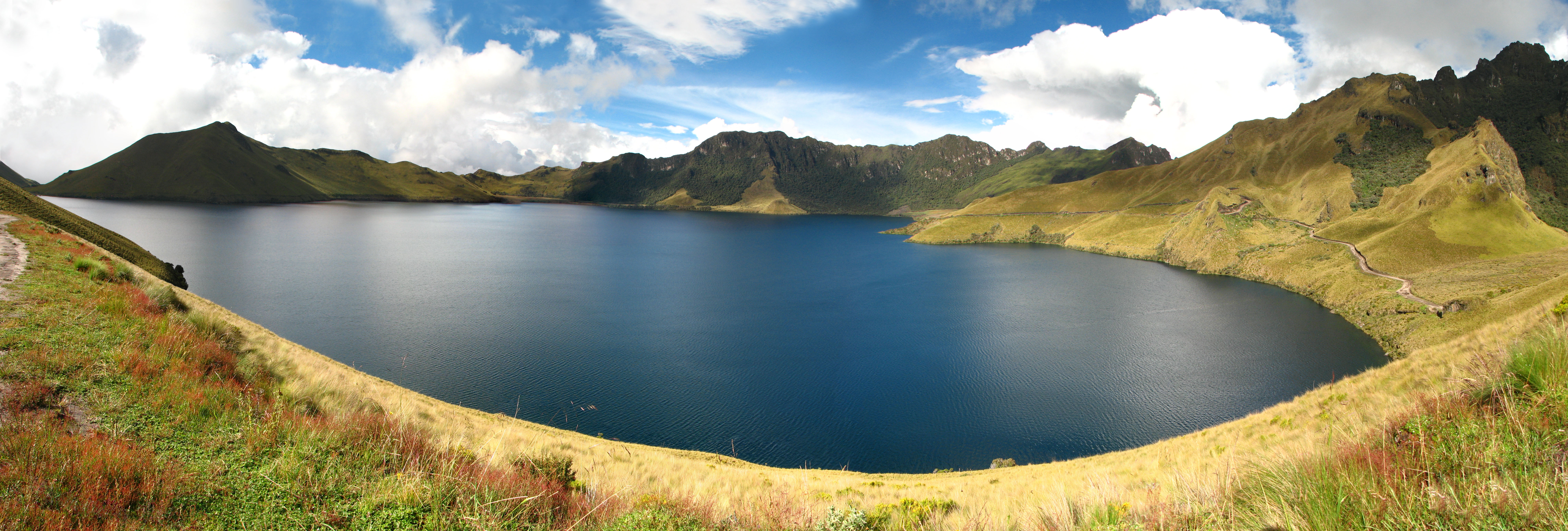
A panorama taken in Mojanda volcanic lakes

== See also ==
- Lists of volcanoes
  - List of volcanoes in Ecuador
