= Pichincha Province =

Province of Ecuador

Pichincha
- Province
- Province of Pichincha
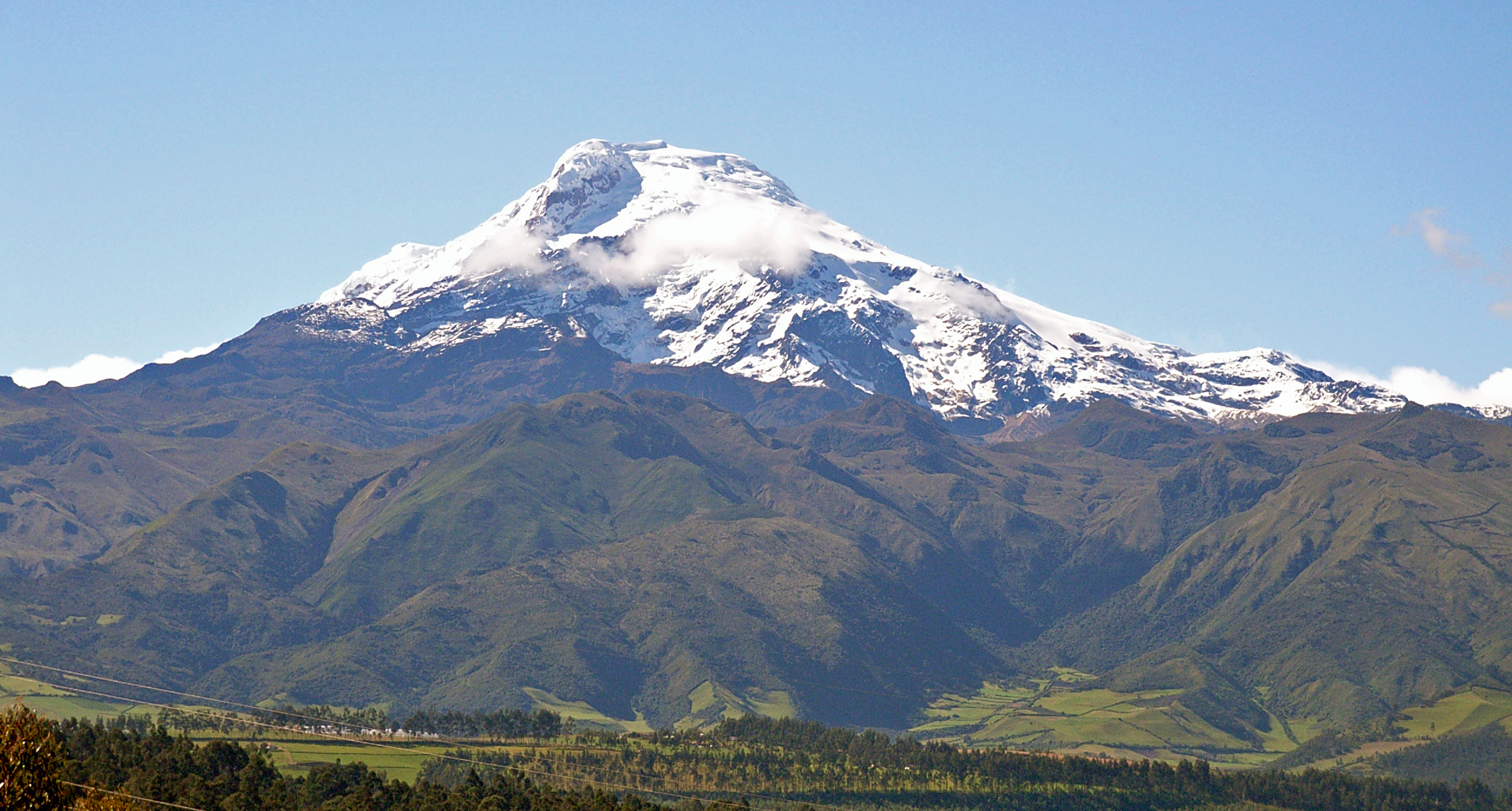
- Cayambe volcano

- Flag
- Nickname: La Cuna de La Libertad; English: The Cradle of Liberty
- Location of Pichincha in Ecuador.

- Cantons of Pichincha Province
- Coordinates: 0°15′S 78°35′W
- Country: Ecuador
- Established: June 25, 1824
- Named after: Pichincha volcano
- Capital and largest city: Quito
- Cantons: List of Cantons: Cayambe; Mejía; Pedro Moncayo; Pedro Vicente Maldonado; Puerto Quito; Quito; Rumiñahui; San Miguel de los Bancos

Government
  - Prefect: Paola Pabón (RC)
  - Vice Prefect: Alexandro Tonello
  - Governor: abolished

Area
  - Total: 9,444 km^{2} (3,646 sq mi)

Population (2022 census)
  - Total: 3,089,473
  - Rank: 2nd in Ecuador
  - Density: 327.1/km^{2} (847.3/sq mi)
- Time zone: UTC−5 (ECT)
- ISO 3166 code: EC-P
- Vehicle registration: P
- HDI (2018): 0.827 very high · 1st
- Website: www.pichincha.gov.ec

Pichincha (Spanish pronunciation: [piˈtʃintʃa]) is a province of Ecuador located in the northern Sierra region; its capital and largest city is Quito. It is bordered by Imbabura and Esmeraldas to the north, Cotopaxi and Santo Domingo de los Tsáchilas to the south, Napo and Sucumbíos to the east, and Esmeraldas and Santo Domingo de los Tsáchilas to the west.

Prior to 2008, the canton Santo Domingo de los Colorados was part of the Pichincha Province. It has since become its own province, Santo Domingo de los Tsáchilas.

The province is home to many rose plantations, which make up the bulk of Ecuador's floriculture industry.

== Demographics ==
Ethnic groups as of the Ecuadorian census of 2010:

- Mestizo 82.1%
- White 6.3%
- Indigenous 5.3%
- Afro-Ecuadorian 4.5%
- Montubio 1.3%
- Other 0.4%

== Population growth ==
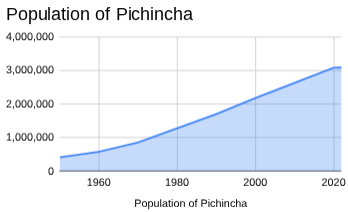
Pichincha Population Growth Chart

Pichincha has maintained its status as a vital demographic and political center of Ecuador, experiencing steady urbanization throughout the late 20th and early 21st centuries. In 1950, the province recorded a population of 414,533. This number grew significantly over the following decades as the highland region saw increased migration and infrastructure development, reaching 857,014 by 1970.

The turn of the millennium marked a major milestone as the population climbed to 2,179,558, reflecting the province's expanding role in the nation's economy. Recent data shows a stabilization of this growth; the population reached 3,087,202 in 2020 and sits at 3,089,473 as of the 2022 census. This highlights Pichincha's position as a densely populated region characterized by both its historic capital and its rapidly evolving surrounding parishes.

== Administrative divisions ==
Pichincha Provincial Council Tower, which holds the government offices of Pichincha Province

The province is divided into eight cantons.

Canton	Pop. (2001)	Area (km^{2})	Cantonization	Capital
Cayambe	69,800	1,187	July 23, 1883	Cayambe
Mejía	62,888	1,459	July 23, 1883	Machachi
Pedro Moncayo	25,594	333	Sep. 26, 1911	Tabacundo
Pedro Vicente Maldonado	9,965	657	Jan. 28, 1992	Pedro Vicente Maldonado
Puerto Quito	17,100	719	Apr. 1, 1996	Puerto Quito
Quito	1,839,853	4,204	Dec. 6, 1534	Quito
Rumiñahui	65,882	134	May 31, 1938	Sangolquí
San Miguel de Los Bancos	10,717	801	Feb. 14, 1991	San Miguel de los Bancos

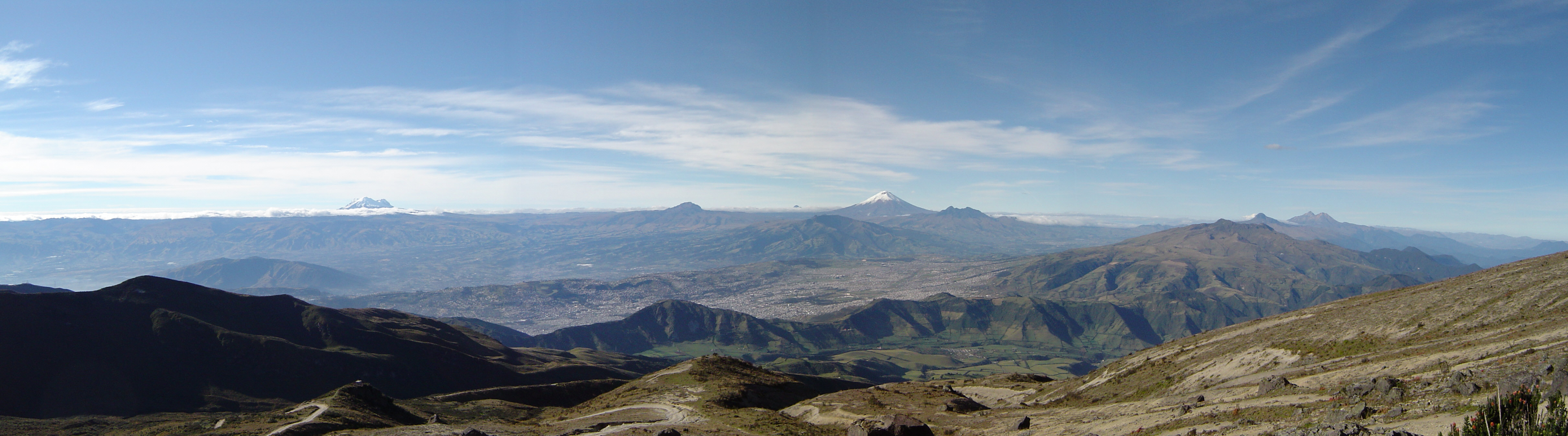
Panoramic view from Wawa Pichincha: (from left) Ilaló, Antisana, Sincholagua, Quilindaña, Pasochoa, Cotopaxi, Rumiñawi, Atacazo, Corazón and Illinizas

== See also ==
- Cantons of Ecuador
- Centro de Levantamientos Integrados de Recursos Naturales por Sensores Remotos
- Provinces of Ecuador
- Santa Lucia Cloud Forest
