= List of bridges in Ecuador =

This is a list of bridges and viaducts in Ecuador, including those for pedestrians and vehicular traffic.

== Historical and architectural interest bridges ==
	Name	Distinction	Length	Type	Carries Crosses	Opened	Location	Province	Ref.
1	Aguarico River Bridge	Designed by Toni Rüttimann	264 m (866 ft)	Suspension; Steel	Footbridge; Aguarico River		El Dorado de Cascales; 0°04′15.9″N 77°15′03.4″W	Sucumbíos Province	
2	San Francisco Bridge (Baños)	Bungee jumping spot		Beam bridge Composite steel/concrete deck V-shaped legs	Road bridge Pastaza River		Baños de Agua Santa; 1°23′39.1″S 78°25′28.4″W	Tungurahua Province	

== Major road and railway bridges ==
This table presents the structures with spans greater than 100 metres (330 ft) (non-exhaustive list).

	Name	Span	Length	Type	Carries Crosses	Opened	Location	Province	Ref.
1	Río Napo Bridge	312 m (1,024 ft)	740 m (2,430 ft)	Cable-stayed; Composite steel/concrete deck, concrete pylons	Ecuador Highway 45A; Napo River	2012	Puerto Francisco de Orellana; 0°28′22.9″S 76°58′44.7″W	Orellana Province	
2	Río Aguarico Bridge	270 m (890 ft)	440 m (1,440 ft)	Cable-stayed; Composite steel/concrete deck, concrete pylons 85+270+85	Ecuador Highway 45A; Aguarico River	2012	Nueva Loja; 0°03′36.2″N 76°52′52.2″W	Sucumbíos Province	
3	Chiche Bridge (2014)	210 m (690 ft)	314 m (1,030 ft)	Box girder Prestressed concrete V-shaped legs Twin bridges 70+174+70	Road bridge Chiche River	2014	Quito; 0°12′39.4″S 78°22′09.4″W	Pichincha Province	(Note: The Chiche Bridge is the highest bridge in Ecuador with a deck 137 m (449 ft) over the Chiche River.)
4	Río Esmeraldas Bridge	200 m (660 ft)	200 m (660 ft)	Suspension; Concrete pylons	Ecuador Highway 15; Esmeraldas River	1978	Esmeraldas; 0°53′41.8″N 79°38′14.6″W	Esmeraldas Province	
5	Río Pastaza Bridge	180 m (590 ft)	303 m (994 ft)	Cable-stayed; Composite steel/concrete deck, concrete pylons (steel upper part)	Ecuador Highway 45; Pastaza River	2006	Chuwitayo; 1°55′15.7″S 77°49′26.5″W	Pastaza Province; Morona-Santiago Province	
6	Guayllabamba Bridge	105 m (344 ft)	150 m (490 ft)	Beam bridge Steel; V-shaped legs Twin bridges	Road bridge Guayllabamba River	2014	Quito; 0°06′20.0″S 78°22′56.7″W	Pichincha Province	
7	Salsipuedes Bridge	104 m (341 ft)	186 m (610 ft)	Arch; Steel deck arch	Ecuador Highway 487; Sal-si-puedes River	1960	Pallatanga; 2°03′23.0″S 78°59′05.3″W	Chimborazo Province	
8	Río Pastaza Bridge (Palora)			Suspension; Concrete pylons	Road bridge Pastaza River		Palora; 1°44′15.6″S 77°52′55.9″W	Morona-Santiago Province; Pastaza Province	
9	Gonzalo Icaza Cornejo Bridge			Suspension; Steel pylons	Ecuador Highway 48; Daule River	1958	Daule, Guayas; 1°52′51.3″S 80°00′06.0″W	Guayas Province	
10	Río Daule Bridge (Balzar)			Arch; Steel through arch	Road bridge Avenida Francisco Olivares; Daule River		Balzar; 1°21′27.6″S 79°54′30.7″W	Guayas Province	
11	Río Coca Bridge			Arch; Steel tied arch Bow-string bridge	Ecuador Highway 45A; Coca River		San Sebastián del Coca; 0°20′33.3″S 77°00′26.4″W	Orellana Province	
12	Río Catarama Bridge			Arch; Concrete through arch	Road bridge Catarama River (Ecuador)	2014	Babahoyo; 1°47′37.5″S 79°31′52.0″W	Los Ríos Province	
13	Río Gualo Bridge		200 m (660 ft)	Beam bridge Steel; V-shaped legs Twin bridges	Road bridge Avenida Simón Bolívar; Gualo River		Quito; 0°08′34.6″S 78°26′37.0″W	Pichincha Province	

== See also ==
- Transport in Ecuador
- Highways in Ecuador
- Empresa de Ferrocarriles Ecuatorianos
- Geography of Ecuador
- List of rivers of Ecuador

== Notes and references ==
- Notes
- Nicolas Janberg. "International Database for Civil and Structural Engineering". Structurae.com.
- Others references
