= Palenque (disambiguation) =

Palenque was a Maya city state in southern Mexico that flourished in the 7th century.

Palenque may also refer to:

== Places ==
- Palenque or quilombo, a free village founded by escaped enslaved people in some regions of South America
- Palenque, Chiapas, the modern town and municipality in Mexico
  - Palenque railway station
- Palenque, Colón, a town in Panama
- Palenque, the capital of Yateras, Cuba
- Palenque Canton, a canton of Ecuador
- Isla Palenque, an island of Panama, off the western Pacific shoreline
- San Basilio de Palenque, a Colombian town
- Sabana Grande de Palenque, a municipality in San Cristóbal province, Dominican Republic

== Other uses ==
- Palenque International Airport, Palenque, Chiapas, Mexico
- Palenque language (or Palenquero), a Spanish-based creole language spoken in parts of coastal Colombia
- Palenque River, Ecuador
- an arena or cockpit in cockfighting
- Concerts during Carnival in Jalisco, notably Jalostotitlán, Mexico
- Palenque, a traditional factory to produce the alcoholic drink mezcal

== See also ==
- Palengke, a type of public market common throughout the Philippines
