= Matadero River =

River in Ecuador

Coordinates: 2°53′04″S 78°57′01″W

Location
- Country: Ecuador

The Matadero River is a river of Ecuador. It originates in the city of Cuenca where the Tomebamba River merges with the Machángara River. It is a tributary of the Paute River in the drainage basin of the Amazon River.

== See also ==
- List of rivers of Ecuador
