= List of rivers of Ecuador =

The rivers of Ecuador are an important part of the nation's geography and economy. Most of the over 2,000 rivers and streams have headwaters in the Andes mountain range, flowing therefrom either westward toward the Pacific Ocean or eastward toward the Amazon River. Narrow in the highlands, the majority of the rivers broaden as they reach the lower elevations of the Coast and Oriente. During the rainy season, which lasts from January to April, the rivers that drain into the Pacific flood and often cause damage.

== Geography ==
The two main water systems are the Esmeraldas River in the North and the Guayas in the South.

The Esmeraldas begins as the Guayllabamba River in the Sierra, flowing west before emptying in the Pacific near the city of Esmeraldas.

The Guayas forms to the north of Guayaquil, where the Daule and the Babahoyo Rivers converge. The Babahayo arises from its tributaries in the Andes. The Guayas basin covers 40,000 square kilometers.

The most important rivers in the Oriente are the Pastaza, Napo, and Putumayo. The Pastaza includes the Agoyan Waterfall, Ecuador's highest.

== Economy ==
Prior to the arrival of Europeans, the indigenous people of Ecuador used the rivers for fishing and transportation, although frequent waterfalls limited canoe travel in the Andes. The rivers long continued to be an important means of transportation, especially as the mountains made road and railroad building difficult.

Since the 20th century, rivers have become an important source of electric power in Ecuador. As of 2006, hydroelectric dams have a capacity 1,750 megawatts. Some critics have noted that these projects have tended to be "substantially oversized" without "delivering the promised energy benefits." In 2008, President Rafael Correa announced that the government planned to build eleven new hydroelectric power plants. Almost all of the dam projects face opposition from local communities that fear negative environmental impacts on the land and a lack of transparency in decision-making.

Recreational rafting on the rivers has become an important part of Ecuador's tourism-based economy.

== Rivers ==
This listing is arranged by drainage basin, with respective tributaries indented under each larger stream's name.

=== Atlantic Ocean ===
  - Putumayo River
    - San Miguel River
  - Napo River
    - Curaray River
      - Cononaco River
    - Aguarico River
      - Cuyabeno River
    - Yasuní River
    - Tiputini River
    - Coca River
    - Payamino River
  - Marañón River (Peru)
    - Tigre River
      - Corrientes River
      - Conambo River
      - Pintoyacu River or Pindoyacu
    - Pastaza River
      - Huasaga River
      - Bobonaza River
      - Palora River
      - Chambo River
      - Ambato River
        - Cutuchi River
          - Alaques River
      - Cebadas River
    - Morona River
      - Cangaime River
        - Macuma River
    - Santiago River
      - Yaapi River
      - Upano River
        - Paute River
          - Matadero River or Cuenca
            - Machángara River
            - Tomebamba River
            - Tarqui River
            - Yanuncay River
      - Zamora River
    - Chinchipe River

=== Pacific Ocean ===
- Carchi River
- Mira River
  - San Juan River
  - Chota River
- Cayapas River
  - Santiago River
  - Onzole River
- Esmeraldas River
  - Guayllabamba River
    - Machángara River
  - Blanco River
    - Toachi River
  - Quininde River
- Muisne River
- Cojimies River
  - Mache River
- Coaque River
- Jama River
- Chone River
  - Carrizal River
- Portoviejo River
- Jipijapa River
- Guayas River
  - Taura River
  - Daule River
    - Pula River
    - Magro River or Pedro Carbo
    - Colimes River
      - Boqueron River
    - Puca River
    - Congo River
  - Babahoyo River
    - Yaguachi River
      - Milagro River
      - Chimbo River
      - Chanchán River
    - Vinces River
      - Palenque River
    - Catarama River
      - Zapotal River
    - San Pablo River
- Cañar River
- Balao River
- Jubones River
- Arenillas River
- Zarumilla River
- Tumbes River
  - Puyango River
- Chira River
  - Catamayo River
    - Calvas River

== See also ==
- List of rivers of the Americas by coastline
