= Pseudohemiodon apithanos =

Conservation status
- Least Concern (IUCN 3.1)

Scientific classification
- Kingdom: Animalia
- Phylum: Chordata
- Class: Actinopterygii
- Order: Siluriformes
- Family: Loricariidae
- Genus: Pseudohemiodon
- Species: P. apithanos

Binomial name
- Pseudohemiodon apithanos Isbrücker & Nijssen, 1978

Species of fish

Pseudohemiodon apithanos is a species of freshwater ray-finned fish belonging to the family Loricariidae, the suckermouth armored catfishes, and the subfamily Loricariinae, the mailed catfishes. This catfish is found in the upper Amazon basin of Peru and Ecuador, in Peru it has been recorded from the Itaya, Alejandro, San Miguel, Putumayo, Napo, Nieva and Marañón rivers while in Ecuador it is known from the Napo-Pastaza drainage. This species reaches a maximum standard length of 14.5 cm (5.7 in).
