= Alaques River =

River in Ecuador

Alaques River is a river of Ecuador. It flows through Cotopaxi Province and passes near Latacunga. It is a tributary of the Cutuchi River.

== See also ==
- List of rivers of Ecuador
