= Congo River (Ecuador) =

River of Ecuador

Location
- Country: Ecuador

The Congo River is a river in Ecuador.

== See also ==
- List of rivers of Ecuador
