= Cañar River =

River in Ecuador

- Location of mouth

Location
- Country: Ecuador

Physical characteristics
- Mouth
  - location: Pacific Ocean
  - coordinates: 2°39′28″S 79°45′57″W
  - elevation: 0 m (0 ft)

The Cañar River is a river of Ecuador.

== See also ==
- List of rivers of Ecuador
