= Balao River =

River of Ecuador

- Location of mouth

Location
- Country: Ecuador

Physical characteristics
- Mouth
  - location: Pacific Ocean
  - coordinates: 2°52′40″S 79°50′50″W
  - elevation: 0 m (0 ft)

The Balao River (approved name:Río Balao Grande) is a river of Ecuador.

== See also ==
- List of rivers of Ecuador
