= Toachi River =

River of Ecuador

Location
- Country: Ecuador

The Toachi River is a river of Ecuador. It is located a few hours from Quito and is the country's most popular river for rafting.

== See also ==
- List of rivers of Ecuador
