= Pseudohemiodon lamina =

Conservation status
- Least Concern (IUCN 3.1)

Scientific classification
- Kingdom: Animalia
- Phylum: Chordata
- Class: Actinopterygii
- Order: Siluriformes
- Family: Loricariidae
- Genus: Pseudohemiodon
- Species: P. lamina

Binomial name
- Pseudohemiodon lamina (Günther, 1868)

Synonyms
- Loricaria lamina Günther, 1868

Species of fish

Pseudohemiodon lamina is a species of freshwater ray-finned fish belonging to the family Loricariidae, the suckermouth armored catfishes, and the subfamily Loricariinae, the mailed catfishes. This catfish is found in the Ucayali, Marañon and Amazon basins in Peru and the Orthon and Madre de Dios basins in Bolivia. This species reacjhes a maximum standard length of 15.9 cm (6.3 in).
