= Pseudohemiodon devincenzii =

Conservation status
- Data Deficient (IUCN 3.1)

Scientific classification
- Kingdom: Animalia
- Phylum: Chordata
- Class: Actinopterygii
- Order: Siluriformes
- Family: Loricariidae
- Genus: Pseudohemiodon
- Species: P. devincenzii

Binomial name
- Pseudohemiodon devincenzii (Señorans, 1950)

Species of fish

Pseudohemiodon devincenzii is a species of freshwater ray-finned fish belonging to the family Loricariidae, the suckermouth armored catfishes, and the subfamily Loricariinae, the mailed catfishes. This catfish is known only from a single specimen, the holotype, collected from the Uruguay River. The holoptype had a standard length of 14.3 cm (5.6 in). Its specific name honours the Uruguayan naturalist Garibaldi José Devincenzi, of the Museo de Historia Natural de Montevideo.
