= Pseudohemiodon thorectes =

Conservation status
- Data Deficient (IUCN 3.1)

Scientific classification
- Kingdom: Animalia
- Phylum: Chordata
- Class: Actinopterygii
- Order: Siluriformes
- Family: Loricariidae
- Genus: Pseudohemiodon
- Species: P. thorectes

Binomial name
- Pseudohemiodon thorectes Isbrücker, 1975

Species of fish

Pseudohemiodon thorectes is a species of freshwater ray-finned fish belonging to the family Loricariidae, the suckermouth armored catfishes, and the subfamily Loricariinae, the mailed catfishes. This catfish is endemic to Bolivia where it is found in the basins of the Mamoré and Grande rivers in the Amazon basin. The maximum standard length reached by this fish is 11.7 cm (4.6 in).
