= Yanuncay River =

River in Ecuador

Coordinates: 2.9103°S 79.0147°W

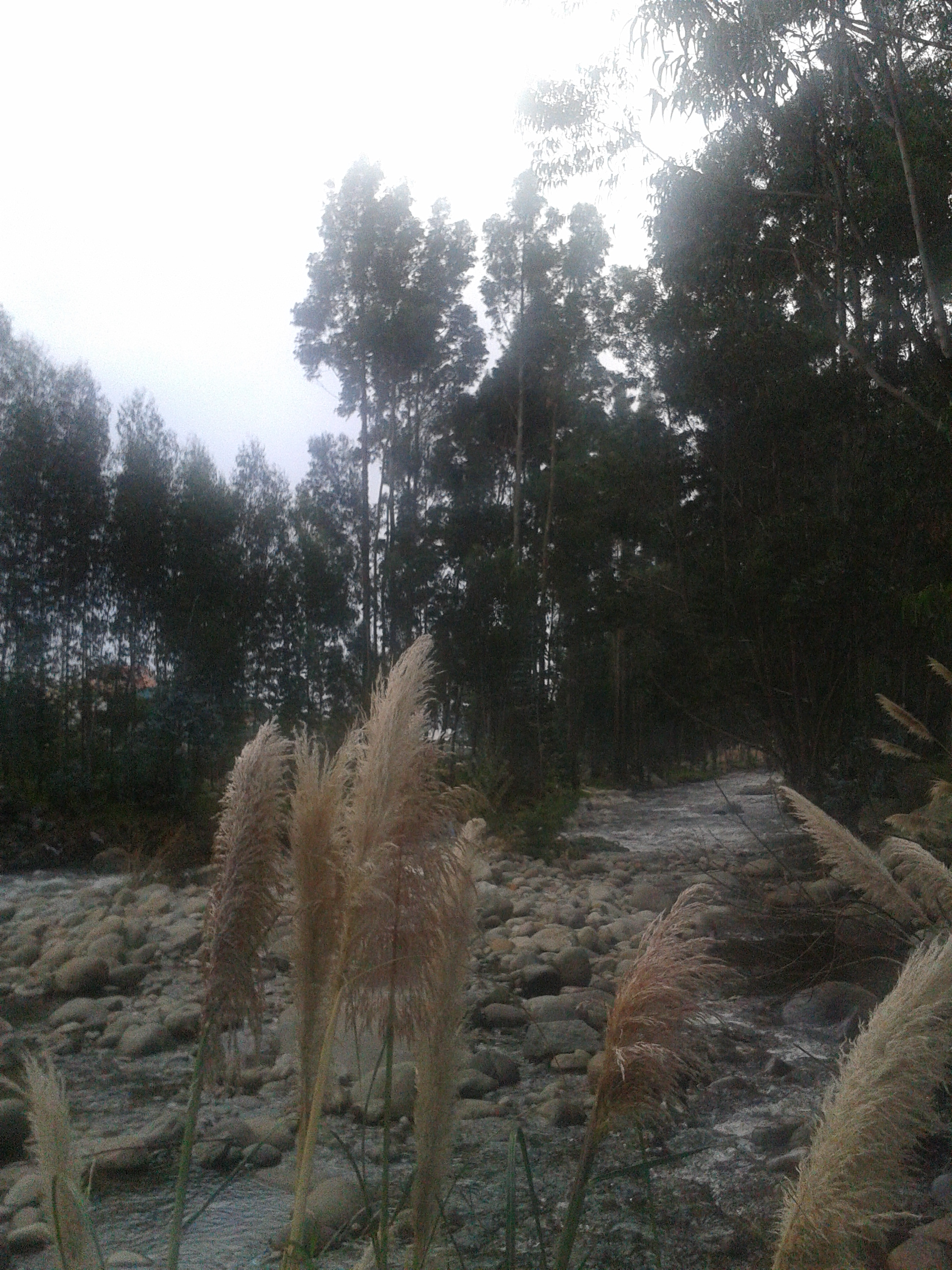

Location
- Country: Ecuador

The Yanuncay River is a river of Ecuador. It runs through the city of Cuenca.

== See also ==
- List of rivers of Ecuador
