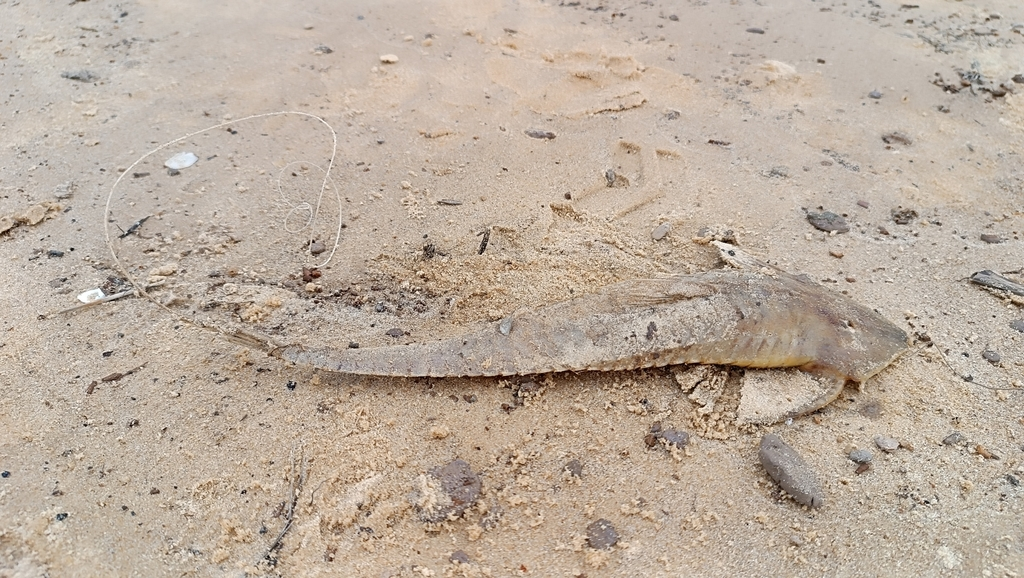

Conservation status
- Least Concern (IUCN 3.1)

Scientific classification
- Kingdom: Animalia
- Phylum: Chordata
- Class: Actinopterygii
- Order: Siluriformes
- Family: Loricariidae
- Genus: Pseudohemiodon
- Species: P. laticeps

Binomial name
- Pseudohemiodon laticeps (Regan, 1904)

Synonyms
- Loricaria laticeps Regan, 1904

= Pseudohemiodon laticeps =

Species of fish

Pseudohemiodon laticeps is a species of freshwater ray-finned fish belonging to the family Loricariidae, the suckermouth armored catfishes, and the subfamily Loricariinae, the mailed catfishes. This catfish is found in the Uruguay, Paraná, and Paraguay river basins, it has been recorded from Argentina, Brazil and Paraguay. This species reaches a maximum standard length of 29.8 cm (11.7 in).
