= Jipijapa River =

River of Ecuador

- Location of mouth

Location
- Country: Ecuador

Physical characteristics
- Mouth
  - location: Pacific Ocean
  - coordinates: 1°21′05″S 80°44′04″W

The Jipijapa River is a river of Ecuador.

== See also ==
- List of rivers of Ecuador
