= Tarqui River =

River of Ecuador

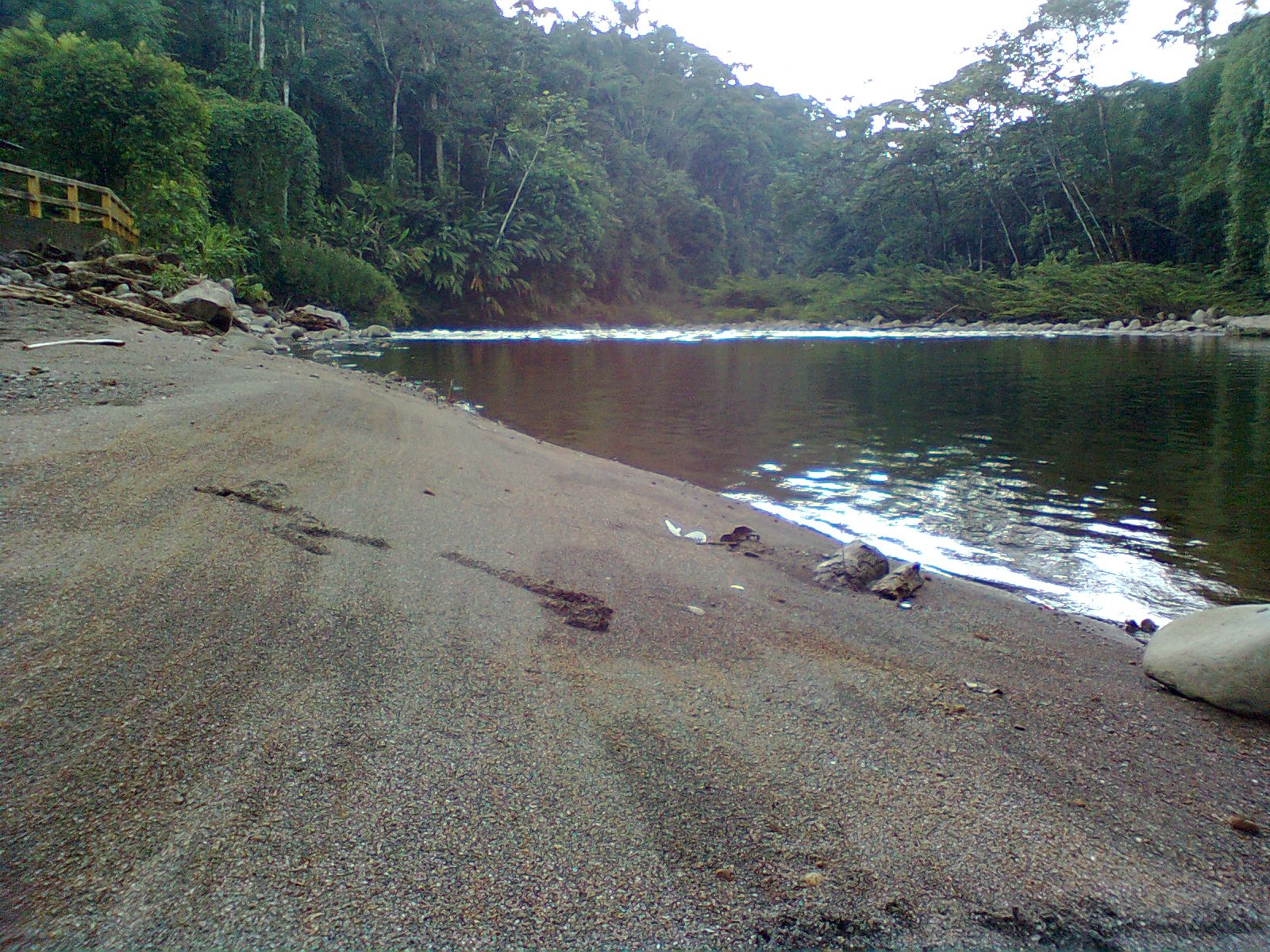

Location
- Country: Ecuador

The Tarqui River (Spanish: Río Tarqui) is a river located primarily in the Azuay Province of Ecuador. Its path begins near the town of Paute, and ends shortly after passing the city of Cuenca, which is located on the north bank of the river.

== See also ==
- List of rivers of Ecuador
