= Mote pillo =

Ecuadorian dish prepared with cooked corn and eggs

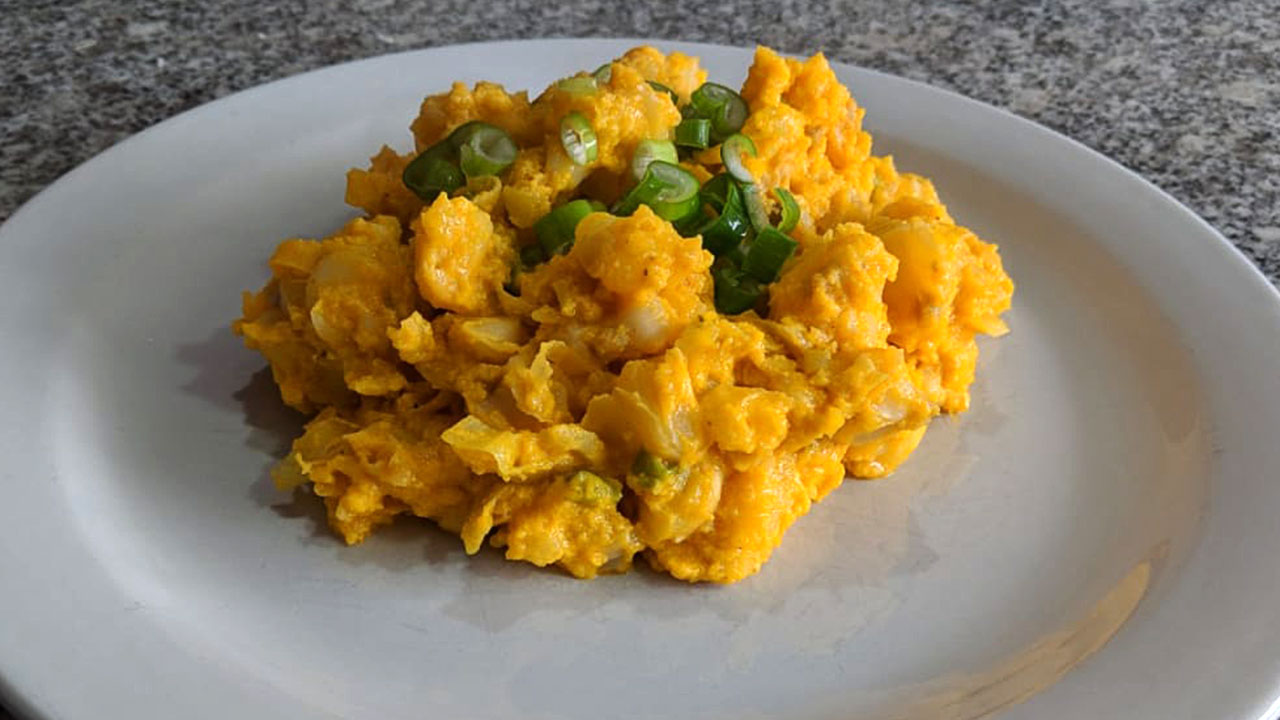
Mote pillo. It is also used as a side dish at lunchtime.

Mote pillo is one of the most typical dishes from Cuenca, the Azuay province and the whole southern highlands in Ecuador.

== Ingredients ==
According to one of the classic recipes, mote pillo has: corn, eggs, milk, annatto, green onions, and salt. Garlic and cumin are also used.

== Similar dishes ==
Mote pillo is one of three emblematic dishes of the Azuay province, the other two being mote sucio (dirty mote, so-called because the corn is combined with crisp pork crumbs), and Motepata, a hearty soup traditionally prepared for carnival.
