= Jama River =

River in Ecuador

- Location of mouth

Location
- Country: Ecuador

Physical characteristics
- Mouth
  - coordinates: 0°09′49″S 80°15′59″W
- Discharge
  - average: m^{3}/s

The Jama River is a river of Ecuador in Manabí Province. It runs approximately 48 kilometres (30 miles) out to the Pacific Ocean.

== See also ==
- List of rivers of Ecuador
