= Onzole River =

River of Ecuador

Coordinates: 0.8821°N 79.0599°W

Location
- Country: Ecuador

The Onzole River is a river of Ecuador.

== See also ==
- List of rivers of Ecuador
