= Pseudohemiodon amazonum =

Conservation status
- Least Concern (IUCN 3.1)

Scientific classification
- Kingdom: Animalia
- Phylum: Chordata
- Class: Actinopterygii
- Order: Siluriformes
- Family: Loricariidae
- Genus: Pseudohemiodon
- Species: P. amazonum

Binomial name
- Pseudohemiodon amazonum (Delsman, 1941)

Synonyms
- Loricaria apeltogaster var. amazonum Delsman, 1941

Species of fish

Pseudohemiodon amazonum is a species of freshwater ray-finned fish belonging to the family Loricariidae, the suckermouth armored catfishes, and the subfamily Loricariinae, the mailed catfishes. This catfish is endemic to Brazil where it occurs in the lower Amazon basin in the state of Pará. This species grows to a standard length of 9.2 cm (3.6 in).
