= Magro River =

River of Ecuador

Location
- Country: Ecuador

Physical characteristics
- Mouth
  - location: 1°52′34″S 80°00′26″W

The Magro River (Spanish: Rio Magro) is a river of Ecuador. It is a tributary of the Daule River.

== See also ==
- List of rivers of Ecuador
