= Cangaime River =

River of Ecuador

Location
- Country: Ecuador

The Cangaime River is a freshwater river of Ecuador. It flows to the east of the Andes mountains and through the eastern part of Ecuador. According to the Water Resources Assessment of Ecuador, the Cangaime River is a favorable area for wells.

== See also ==
- List of rivers of Ecuador
