= Arenillas River =

River in Ecuador

- Location of mouth

Location
- Country: Ecuador

Physical characteristics
- Mouth
  - location: Pacific Ocean
  - coordinates: 3°24′37″S 80°01′44″W
  - elevation: 0 m (0 ft)

The Arenillas River is a river in El Oro Province, Ecuador.

== See also ==
- List of rivers of Ecuador
