= Yaapi River =

River in Ecuador

Location
- Country: Ecuador

The Yaapi River is a river of Ecuador.

== See also ==
- List of rivers of Ecuador
