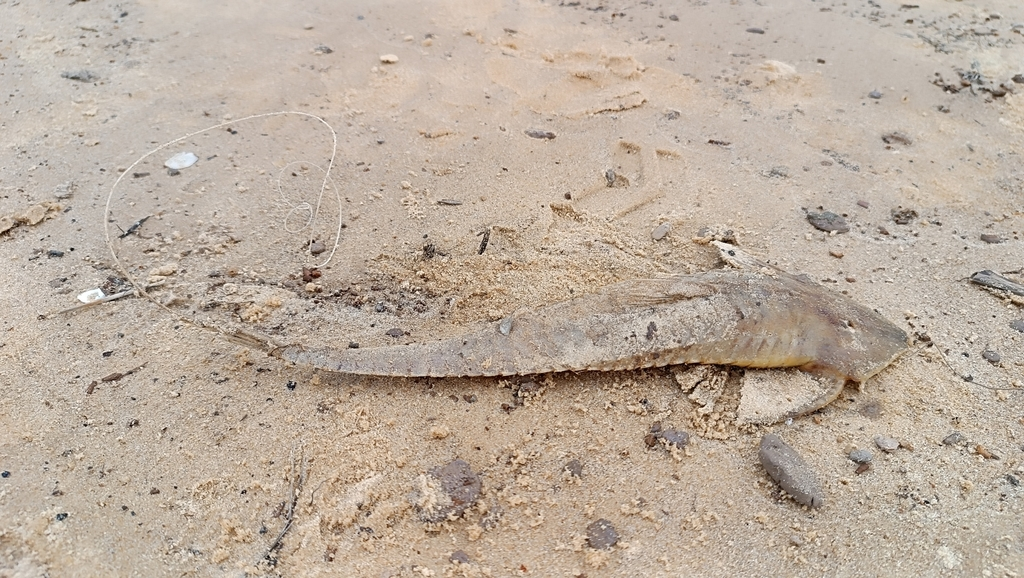
- Pseudohemiodon laticeps

Scientific classification
- Kingdom: Animalia
- Phylum: Chordata
- Class: Actinopterygii
- Order: Siluriformes
- Family: Loricariidae
- Subfamily: Loricariinae
- Genus: Pseudohemiodon; Bleeker, 1862

Type species
- Hemiodon platycephalus Kner, 1853

= Pseudohemiodon =

Genus of fishes

Pseudohemiodon is a genus of freshwater ray-finned fishes belonging to the family Loricariidae, the suckermouth armored catfishes, and the subfamily Loricariinae, the mailed catfishes. The catfishes in this genus are found in South America.

== Species ==
Pseudohemiodon contains the following recognised species:

- Pseudohemiodon almendarizi Provenzano, Argüello & Barriga-Salazar, 2022
- Pseudohemiodon amazonum (Delsman, 1941)
- Pseudohemiodon apithanos Isbrücker & Nijssen, 1978
- Pseudohemiodon devincenzii (Señorans, 1950)
- Pseudohemiodon lamina (Günther, 1868)
- Pseudohemiodon laticeps (Regan, 1904)
- Pseudohemiodon platycephalus (Kner, 1853)
- Pseudohemiodon thorectes Isbrücker, 1975
- Pseudohemiodon unillano Rojas-Molina, Provenzano & Ramírez-Gil, 2019

== Distribution ==
Pseudohemiodon is distributed in the Amazon, Orinoco, and Paraná River basins.

== Description ==
The body of Pseudohemiodon species is very flat and the pelvic fins are used mainly for locomotion on sand. Sexual dimorphism is unknown.

== Ecology ==
Like other members of the Pseudohemiodon group, Pseudohemiodon occurs primarily over sandy substrates. Also like the other genera in the Pseudohemiodon group, species of this genus are abdomino-lip brooders. The very large eggs are incubated by the male.
