= Pseudohemiodon platycephalus =

Conservation status
- Least Concern (IUCN 3.1)

Scientific classification
- Kingdom: Animalia
- Phylum: Chordata
- Class: Actinopterygii
- Order: Siluriformes
- Family: Loricariidae
- Genus: Pseudohemiodon
- Species: P. platycephalus

Binomial name
- Pseudohemiodon platycephalus (Kner, 1853)

Synonyms
- Hemiodon platycephalus Kner, 1853

Species of fish

Pseudohemiodon platycephalus is a species of freshwater ray-finned fish belonging to the family Loricariidae, the suckermouth armored catfishes, and the subfamily Loricariinae, the mailed catfishes. This species is the type species of the genus Pseudohemiodon, it was first formally described as Hemiodon platycephalus by the Austrian ichthyologist Rudolf Kner in 1853, Kner based his description on the name Loricaria playcephala first written down by Johann Natterer in a manuscript> This species is endemic to Brazil where it occurs in the Cuiabá, Miranda and Vermelho rivers, in the Paraguay River basin. P. platycephalus reaches a maximum standard length of 18 cm (7.1 in).
