= Catamayo River =

River of Ecuador

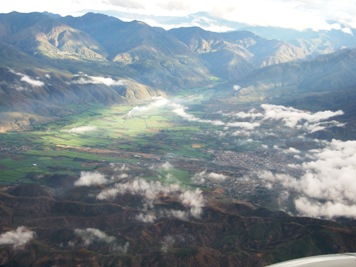

Location
- Country: Ecuador

Physical characteristics
- Source
  - coordinates: 4°17′10″S 80°08′29″W
- Length: 80.15 km

The Catamayo River is a river in Ecuador. It is one of the most important rivers in the Loja Province. It flows into the Pacific Ocean.

== See also ==
- List of rivers of Ecuador
