= Tomebamba River =

River of Ecuador

Coordinates: 2.90140°S 79.00679°W

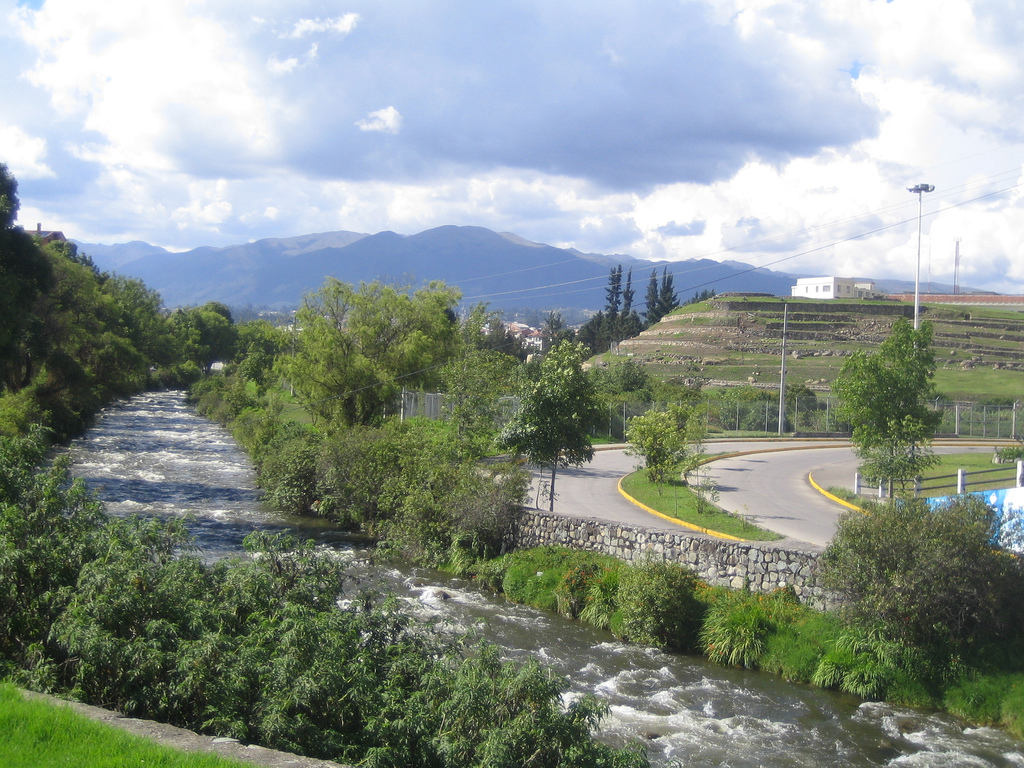
- Tomebamba River on the left and the Pumapungo ruins on the right

Location
- Country: Ecuador

The Tomebamba River is a river of Ecuador. It runs through the city of Cuenca and merges with the Machángara River forming the Matadero River in the basin of the Amazon River and the Atlantic Ocean.

== See also ==
- List of rivers of Ecuador
