= Boqueron River =

River in Ecuador

Location
- Country: Ecuador

The Boqueron River is a river in Ecuador.

== See also ==
- List of rivers of Ecuador
