= Yaguachi River =

River of Ecuador

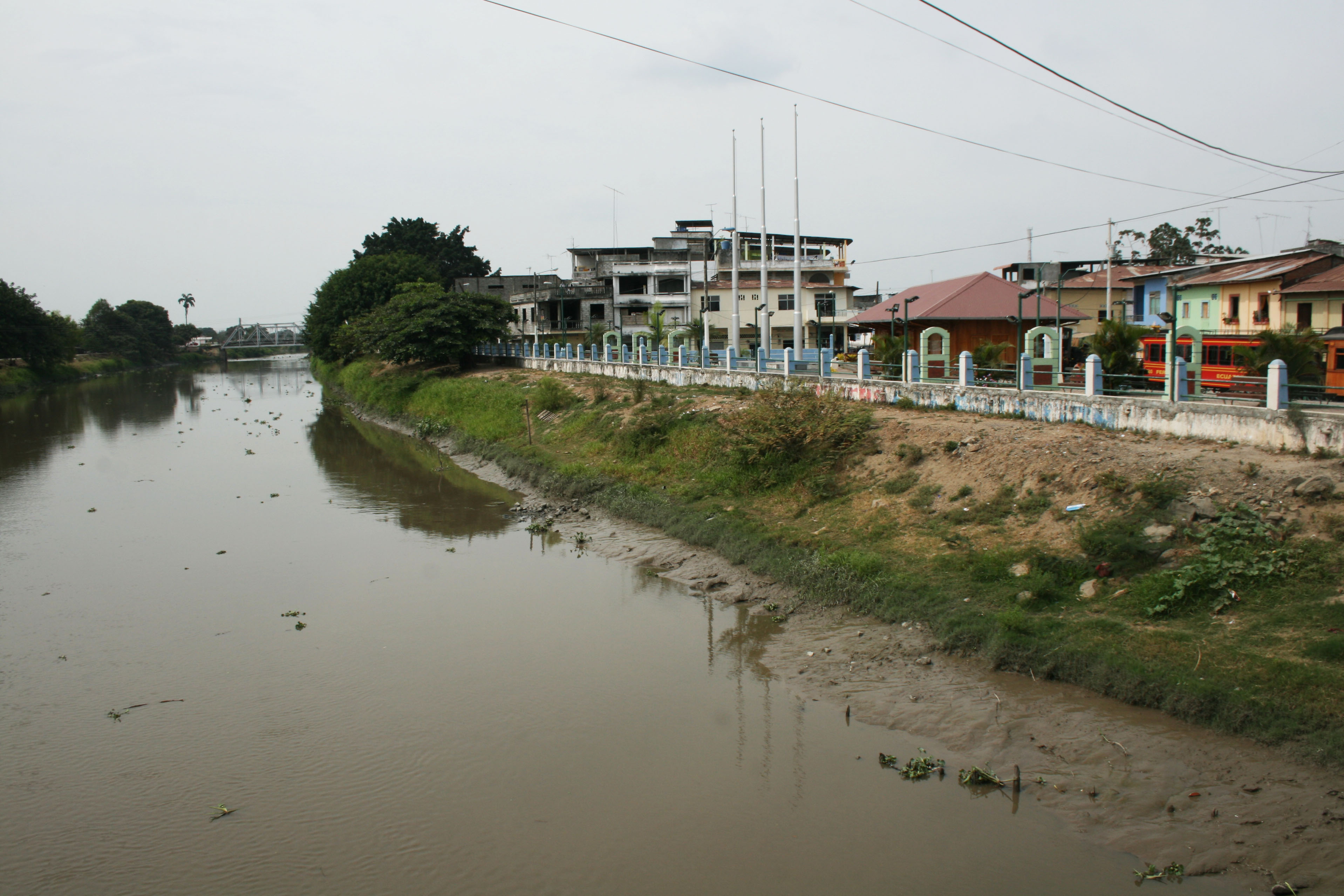

Location
- Country: Ecuador

The Yaguachi River is a river of Ecuador.

== See also ==
- List of rivers of Ecuador
