= Machángara River =

River of Ecuador

Coordinates: 2.88204°S 78.96696°W

Location
- Country: Ecuador

The Machángara River is a river located in the southern Andes of Ecuador. In the city of Cuenca it merges with the Tomebamba River forming the Matadero River in the basin of the Amazon River.

== See also ==
- List of rivers of Ecuador
