= Toni Rüttimann =

Swiss bridge builder (born 1967)

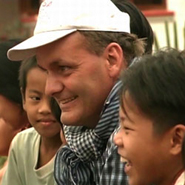
Bridgebuilder Toni Rüttimann – Toni el Suizo

Toni Rüttimann (born 21 August 1967 in Pontresina) is a Swiss bridge builder who works in Southeast Asia and Latin America, where he is known as "Toni el Suizo" (Toni the Swiss).

The bridges are for use of pedestrians, pack animals, motorcycles, two-wheel-tractors – but not for cars. Rüttimann works independently alongside communities in need, using recycled materials and charging no fees. Companies contribute by donating their used material and local governments concede permits and help with transportation in recognition of the fact that the main effort is made by the population. No one asks for anything in return and the bridge belongs to the population who built it.

In every country where Rüttimann works, he builds up a small team of national welders and looks for one "bridge-building partner", to whom he teaches his craft, and who in turn is able to perform maintenance duties on the bridges built. Rüttimann has no home residence: he carries everything he needs in two bags. One for his personal belongings, the other for his laptop computer and a few tools for his trade. As of August 22, 2017, in collaboration with local communities, he has built 760 bridges which serve two million people.

== Biography ==
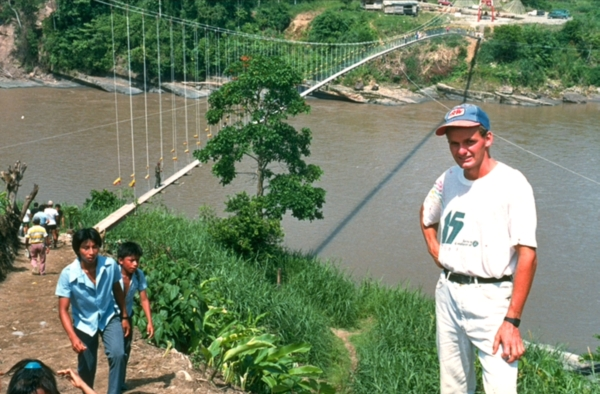
Rüttimann and the bridge across the Aguarico River, built by the villagers

=== Early life and beginnings in Ecuador ===
Rüttimann was born in Pontresina, Switzerland. In 1987, two weeks before finishing high school at the Lyceum Alpinum Zuoz, Rüttimann saw images on TV of the destruction caused by an earthquake in Ecuador. He decides to depart to South America on the night of his graduation, taking his personal savings and 9000 Swiss Francs donated by neighbours of Pontresina and the Engadine Valley.

Once in the disaster area, in northeastern Ecuador, Rüttimann met a Dutch hydraulics engineer. With his technical help and assistance from the people of the Flor del Valle village, cut off from the outside by a tributary of the Aguarico river, he builds a 52-meter long suspension bridge. After six months in Ecuador, Rüttimann returned to Switzerland and began studying civil engineering at the Federal Institute of Technology in Zurich. However, seven weeks later he decided to leave university and returned to Ecuador to help.

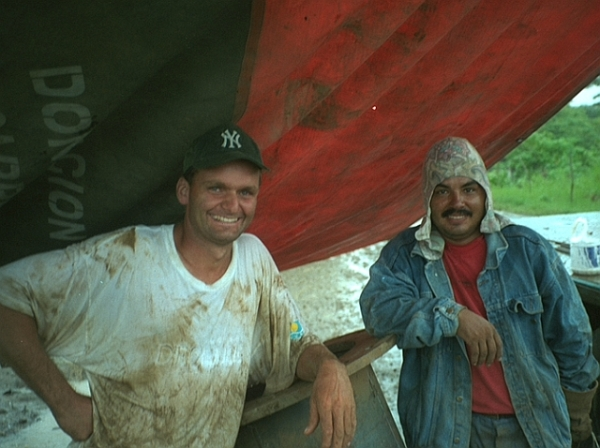
Rüttimann with Walter Yánez

In the Amazon region of Ecuador he put together a system for building bridges with local communities, requiring almost no money: the villagers bring stone and sand, the hard wood and their labour. Rüttimann asked for donations of used wire rope from the oil drilling rigs in the region and for scrap pipe from the national oil company Petroecuador.

From 1988 to 1990 he built six bridges. One of them, across the Aguarico river with a span of 264 meters, remains the longest of his bridges, as of 2000. Toni el Suizo, as the Ecuadorian peasants named him, invented the "puentes de chatarra" (bridges made of scrap).

In the Ecuadorean oil town of Lago Agrio, Rüttimann found a partner in Walter Yánez, a welder and mechanic. Over the next seven years the two friends built another 82 bridges throughout Ecuador – always with the help of the local population – as well as 10 bridges in Colombia, in the wake of the 1994 Páez River earthquake at the Nevado del Huila volcano.

=== From Ecuador to Central America ===
By November 1998, Rüttimann and Yánez had built 99 bridges. That same month, with air transport by the Ecuadorian Air Force, the two friends rushed to help in Honduras, devastated by Hurricane Mitch, where they built another 33 bridges. Other bridges followed in Costa Rica and Nicaragua, and also an international bridge between Honduras and El Salvador.

In 2000, Rüttimann received pipes for 29 bridges in the state of Veracruz, Mexico from the steel pipe manufacturer Tamsa (Tubos de Acero de México SA, today TenarisTamsa).

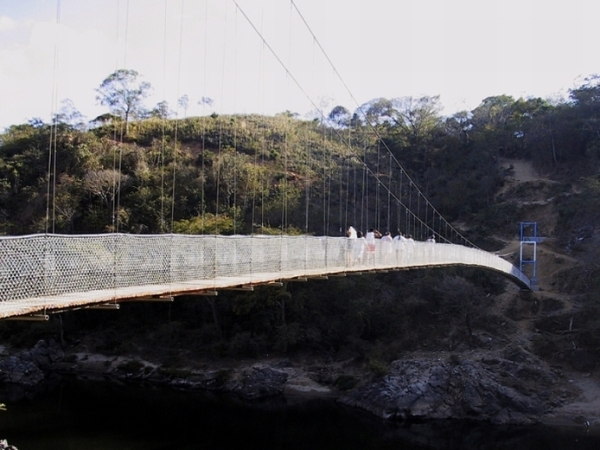
International bridge on the Lempa River, Honduras – El Salvador

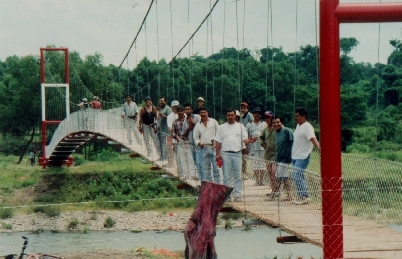
La Lima, Veracruz, Mexico

=== Passage to Cambodia ===
During his visits to Switzerland, Rüttimann gave presentations in schools and universities. On one such occasion, in 2000, he met a Cambodian refugee who asks him for help in the name of his people. In April 2001, he started working with two teams, with Yánez in Mexico and with his two new Cambodian partners, Yin Sopul, a mechanic, and Pen Sopoan, a truck driver, both survivors of the Cambodian genocide perpetrated by the Khmer Rouge.

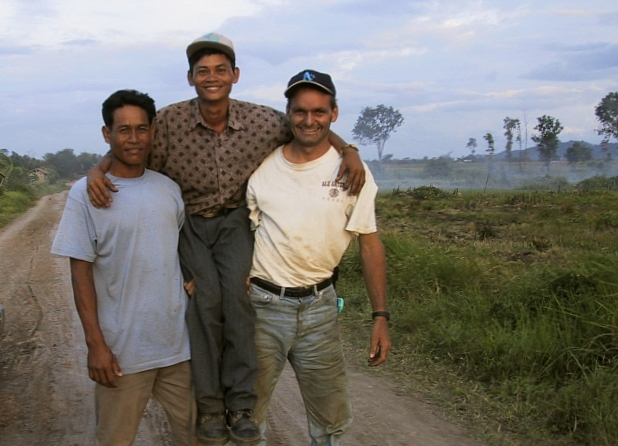
Pen Sopoan and Yin Sopul with Rüttimann in Cambodia

=== Paralyzed by Guillain–Barré syndrome ===
In April 2002, Rüttimann fell ill with Guillain–Barré syndrome, which destroys the myelin of the peripheral nerve system, paralyzing the muscles. Confined to a hospital bed and then admitted to the National Medical Rehabilitation Centre of the Princess Sirindhorn in Thailand, regardless, he never stopped working. In the beginning with a pencil between his lips and the use of his two thumbs, he created a computer program for transforming the measurements sent by his colleagues from Mexico and Cambodia into clear and complete instructions, so that they can continue to build bridges via remote control. This way, Yánez completed 29 bridges in Mexico and then returned to Ecuador, where from 2003 on he continued to build bridges in his homeland.

=== Bridges in Vietnam, Laos, Myanmar, Indonesia ===
After two years of rehabilitation, Rüttimann managed to walk again, and goes to Vietnam. In the province of Ben Tre, with the help of Mai Son, retired Deputy Chairman of the province and former Vietcong combatant, he created a third team. From 2004 to 2008, he built 58 bridges in the Vietnam Mekong Delta provinces of Ben Tre, Bac Lieu, Tra Vinh and Dong Thap.

Rüttimann continued in neighbouring Laos, where he had previously built three bridges with his Cambodian team in 2006. With Laotian truck driver Lanh and three welders he built 42 bridges between 2008 and 2010. Mid-2008 he went to Myanmar, which at the time was still under embargo by the United States of America and the European Union. In Yangon he presented a letter and pictures of bridges built to a member of the government, and just four days later he received authorization from the capital, Nay Pyi Taw, allowing him to build bridges in Myanmar. From that moment on, together with his Myanmar companion Aiklian, a former artisanal gemstone digger, he built bridges throughout the entire national territory, while five welders prepared the bridge components in a government shipyard in Yangon.

In late 2010, Rüttimann began work in Indonesia. Tenaris donated the pipes from its Indonesian subsidiary, while the national government conceded the permits and offered a welding workshop outside of Jakarta. The Indonesian Navy and Army contribute most maritime transportation across the country. Land transportation, however, is normally paid for by the community where the bridge is built.

The Indonesian team consisted of Suntana, a former construction factory operator in Dubai, and four welders. From 2011 to March 2014, the team built 30 bridges on Java and 6 on Sulawesi. On 31 March 2018, Rüttimann was married in Myanmar.

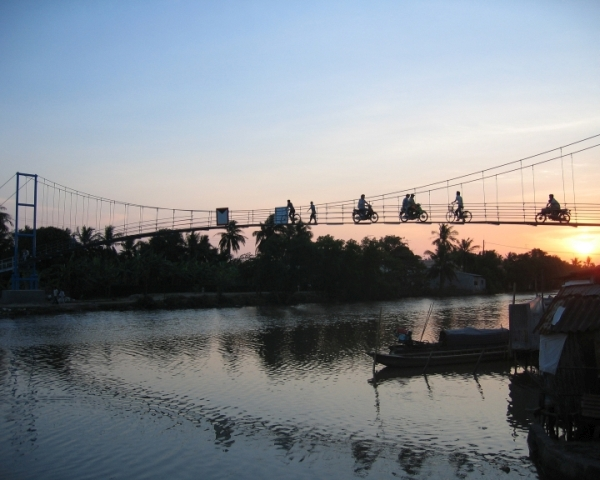
Bridge across national channel between Bac Lieu and Camau, Vietnam

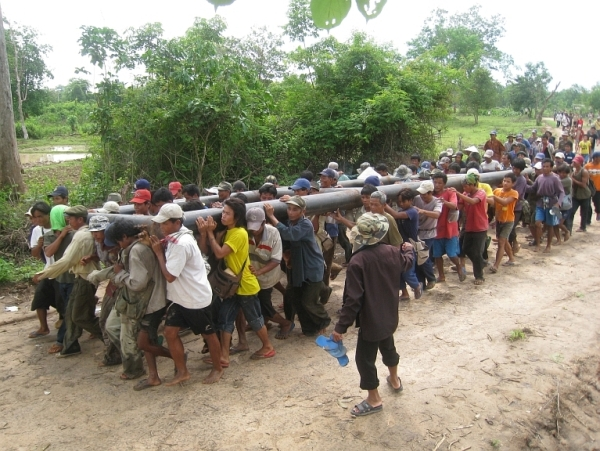
Pylon transport at Xe Xamxoy, Savannakhet, Laos

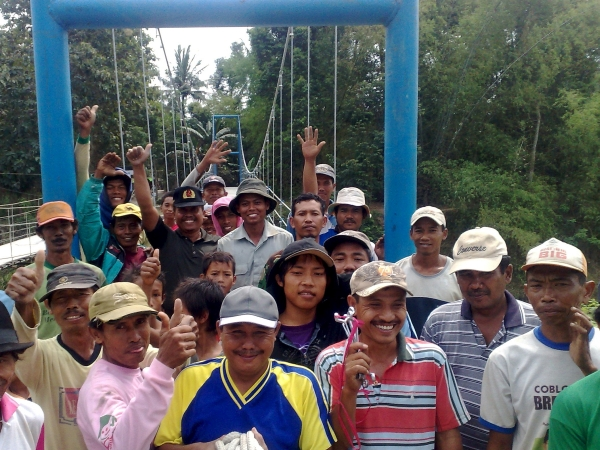
Tamansari, Jember, Jawa Timu

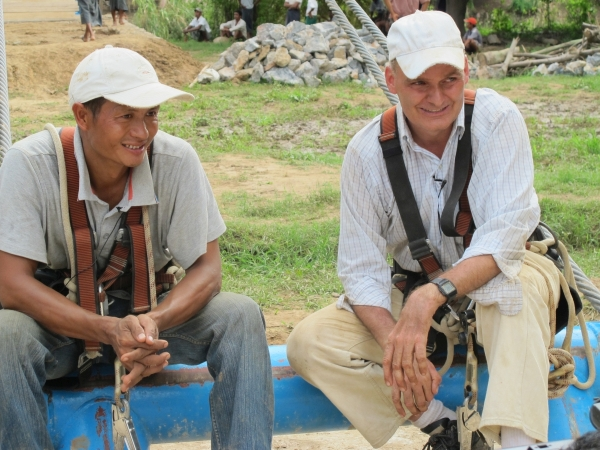
Rüttimann and Aiklian

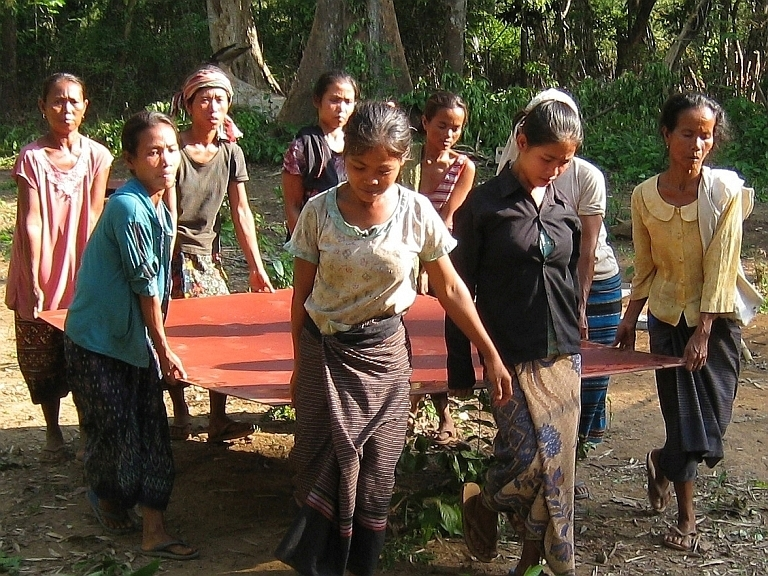
Villager women in Laos carrying a steel plate

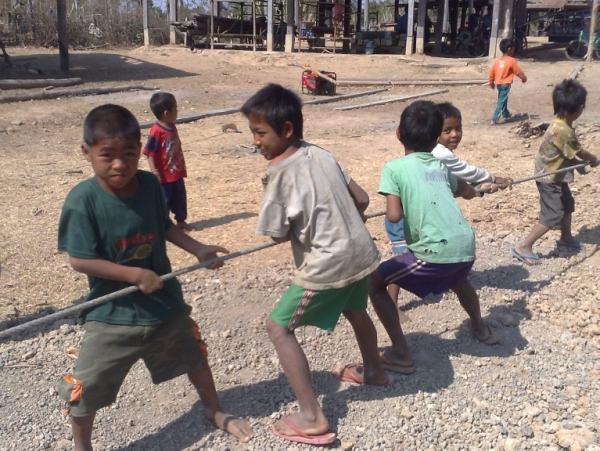
Village children helping

== Supply chain ==
Since 2005, Tenaris, the world's largest producer of seamless steel pipe, has donated the pipes for the bridges Rüttimann builds across the world – scrap and surplus pipes, sometimes even new – from their mills in Italy, Argentina, Brazil, Mexico, Colombia and Indonesia, including the long distance ocean freight to final destination. For an improved bridge deck made of steel, starting in 2004, checkered steel plates were contributed: in Vietnam and in Ecuador by the provincial governments, in Laos and Myanmar by the Argentinean mill of Ternium, one of Latin America's principal steel producers.

Also in 2005, Rüttimann began using wire rope from the mountain cable cars of his home country. In Switzerland, the cable cars are required to change these cables frequently, due to the tight safety regulations imposed by the government. This way, Rüttimann is able to receive cables of several kilometres in length, large diameter and good quality.

Not all bridges built by Rüttimann are still in service. In several places, especially in Ecuador and Cambodia, they have been replaced by vehicular bridges built by the government. In some places they have been rendered unusable due to the lack of maintenance, or even destroyed by natural disasters, as occurred in 2008 in the Páez River valley in Colombia.

Rüttimann always works with local colleagues, so that interested communities can ask for their help for replacement of wire rope or other important repairs. At present there have been no accidents of any significance during the construction of these bridges. This is mainly attributable to the fact that local people are used to heavy labour and that strict safety rules and procedures are followed during prefabrication and construction.

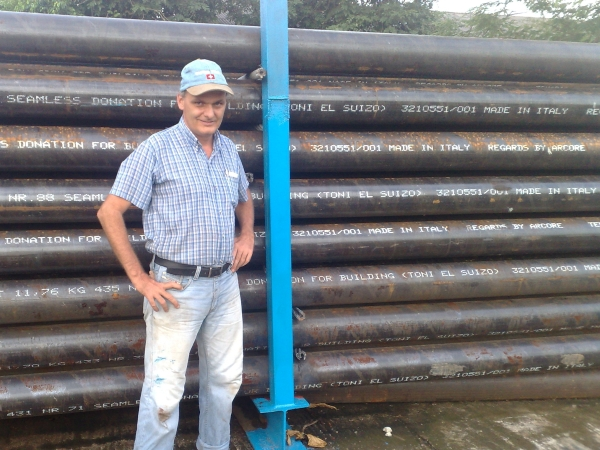
Pipes in Yangon donated by Tenaris

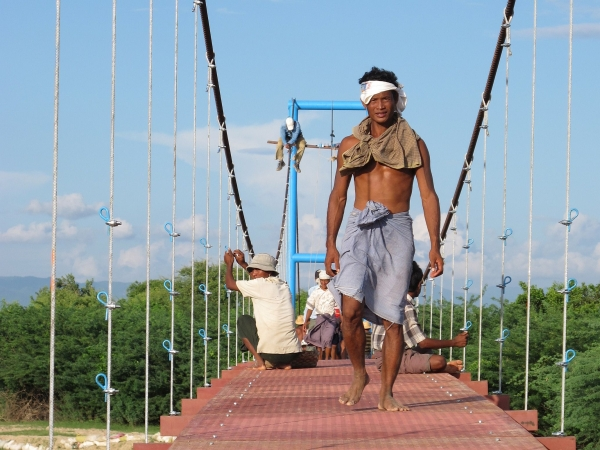
Bridgedeck with checkered steel plates

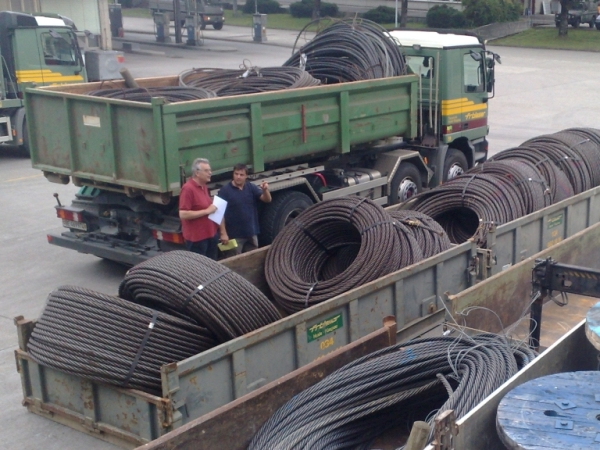
Wire rope donated by the Swiss cable cars

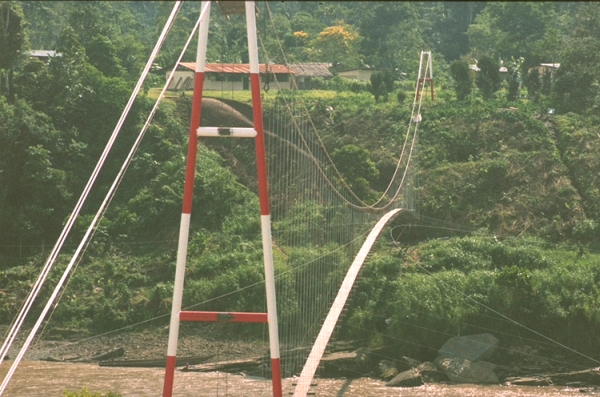
Bridge across the Aguarico River, Ecuador

== Three special bridges ==
Rüttimann has no favourite bridge, but in an interview with the Swiss magazine Schweizer Familie, he remembered three of them: the first is the longest bridge he has built, with a span of 264 meters over the Aguarico river in Ecuador. The second is the international bridge between Honduras and El Salvador, that connects the communities of Mapulaca and Victoria, built by villagers who, in previous years, had fought against each other. The third is a bridge built twice in Myanmar after being destroyed by Kachin Independence Army rebels during guerrilla action. A monk, assisted by the most courageous men of the village, managed to rescue the bridge from the waters.

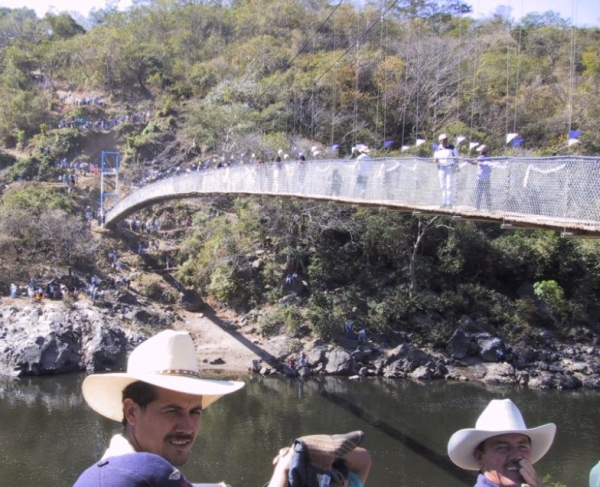
International bridge on the Lempa River, Honduras – El Salvador

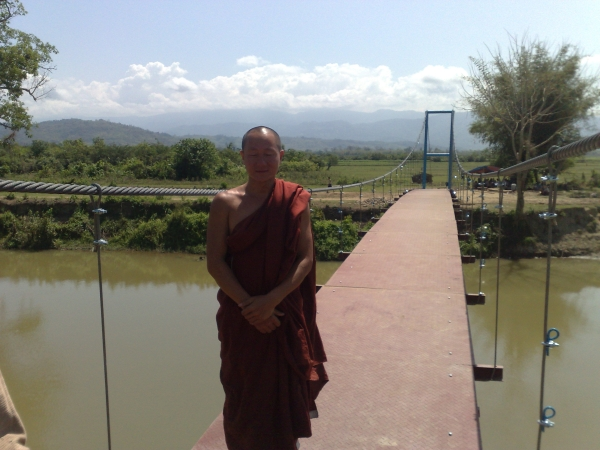
Bridge in Kachin State, Myanmar

== Quotes ==
"Some people need an entire earthquake to wake them up. I am one of these."

"My life is devoted to building bridges between the people on the planet. My dream is not so much to build bridges as such, but rather to help heal wounds, ease suffering, draw people together from all walks of life to create something that is beautiful, something that is good."

"The strength of these bridges comes from the hearts of the people who built them with their own bare hands as well as from the invisible network of people from all over the world who have given the tangible support needed to make this endeavour possible. This strength comes from the people involved. It is the strength of hope that comes when you decide to take your future into your own hands, to change life and shape the world around you."

== Statistics ==
Statistics of bridges, updated March 16, 2022
Country	Finished	Population reached
Cambodia	77	209 500
Indonesia	114	709 300
Laos	43	129 900
Myanmar	135	518 000
Vietnam	58	248 000
Southeast Asia	427	1 814 700
Argentine	2	3 500
Colombia	19	30 200
Costa Rica	14	8 000
Ecuador	332	384 200
El Salvador	1	2 500
Honduras	33	89 700
Mexico	30	22 400
Nicaragua	4	7 700
Latin America	435	584 200
Total	862	2 362 900

== Awards ==
- 1997 23rd recipient of Adele Duttweiler Award
- 1999 recipient of Dr. J.E. Brandenberger Award
- 2000 Special Award of International Association for Bridge and Structural Engineering (IABSE) to recognize his original contributions to bridgebuilding in favour of the poor.

From 2001 onwards, Rüttimann has declined nominations for awards and prizes. He said, "I see myself on the level of the people I work with. [...] I prefer not to receive any awards and not to attend any gala dinners."
