= Colegio Alemán Stiehle =

- Deutsche Schule Stiehle

Location
- Autopista Cuenca - Azogues KM 17 1/2 Sector Challuabamba; Cuenca; Ecuador
- Coordinates: 2.8520803°S 78.91209129999999°W

Information
- Type: German international school
- Grades: 1-12
- Website: casc.edu.ec

Colegio Alemán Stiehle de Cuenca (German: Deutsche Schule Stiehle Cuenca) is a German international school in Cuenca, Ecuador. It serves years 1–12. It is named after German-born Ecuadorian architect Juan Bautista Stiehle.
