= Zapotal River =

River of Ecuador

Location
- Country: Ecuador

The Zapotal River is a river of Ecuador.

== See also ==
- List of rivers of Ecuador
