= Cononaco River =

River of Ecuador and Peru

Coordinates: 1.5486°S 75.5828°W

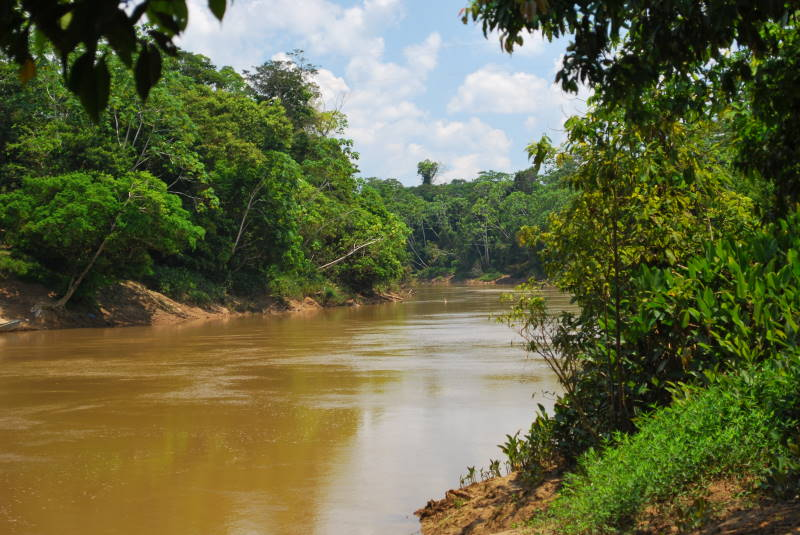

Location
- Countries: Ecuador; Peru

The Cononaco River is a river of Ecuador and Peru.

== See also ==
- List of rivers of Ecuador
