= San Miguel River (Ecuador and Peru) =

River of Ecuador

Location
- Countries: Ecuador; Peru

The San Miguel River is a river of Ecuador and Peru. For much of its length it forms the international boundary between the two countries.

== See also ==
- List of rivers of Ecuador
- List of rivers of Peru
