= Cutuchi River =

River of Ecuador

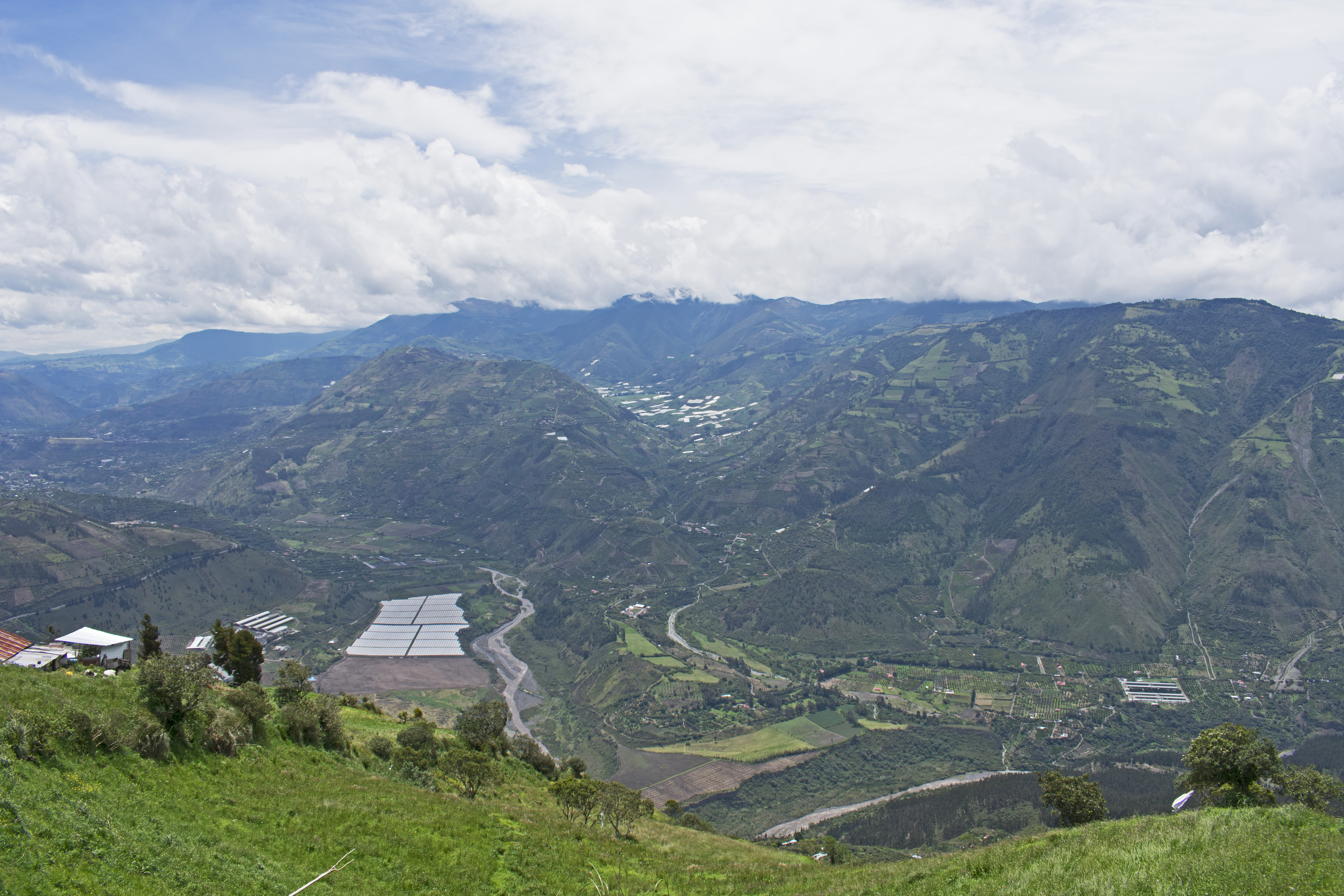

Location
- Country: Ecuador

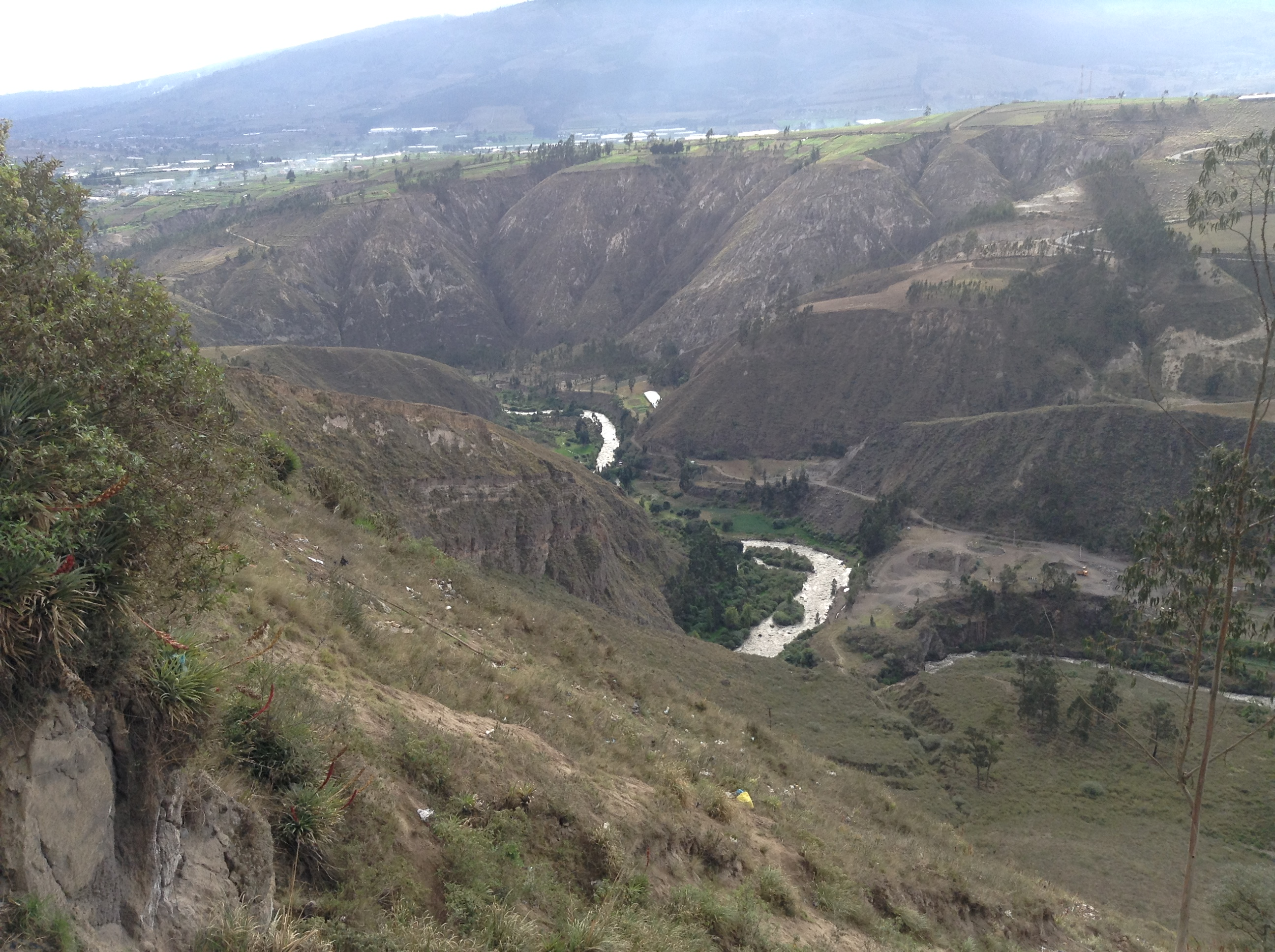
Cutuchi river canyon

The Cutuchi River is a river of Ecuador.

== See also ==
- List of rivers of Ecuador
