= Aguarico River Bridge =

Pedestrian bridge in Ecuador

Coordinates: 0°04′16″N 77°15′3.2″W

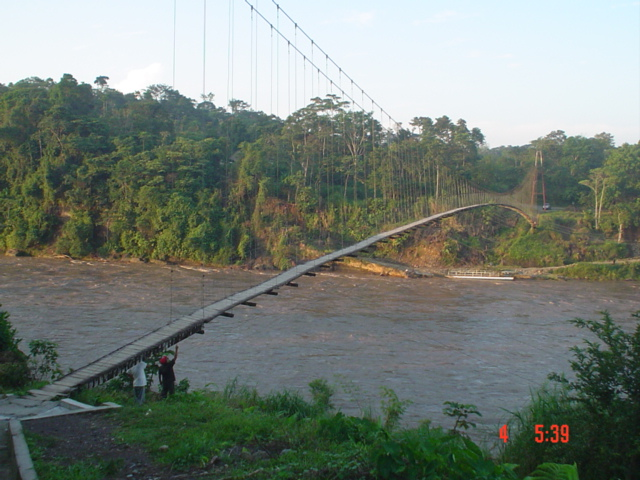
Aguarico River Bridge

The Aguarico River Bridge is a pedestrian suspension bridge over the Aguarico River in Sucumbíos Province, El Oriente, Ecuador. It is 264 m long and was designed by Toni Rüttimann. It is an example of community work and was made from materials discarded by the petroleum industry that operates in the area.
