= Cuenca, Ecuador =

Cuenca
- City
- Santa Ana de los Ríos de Cuenca
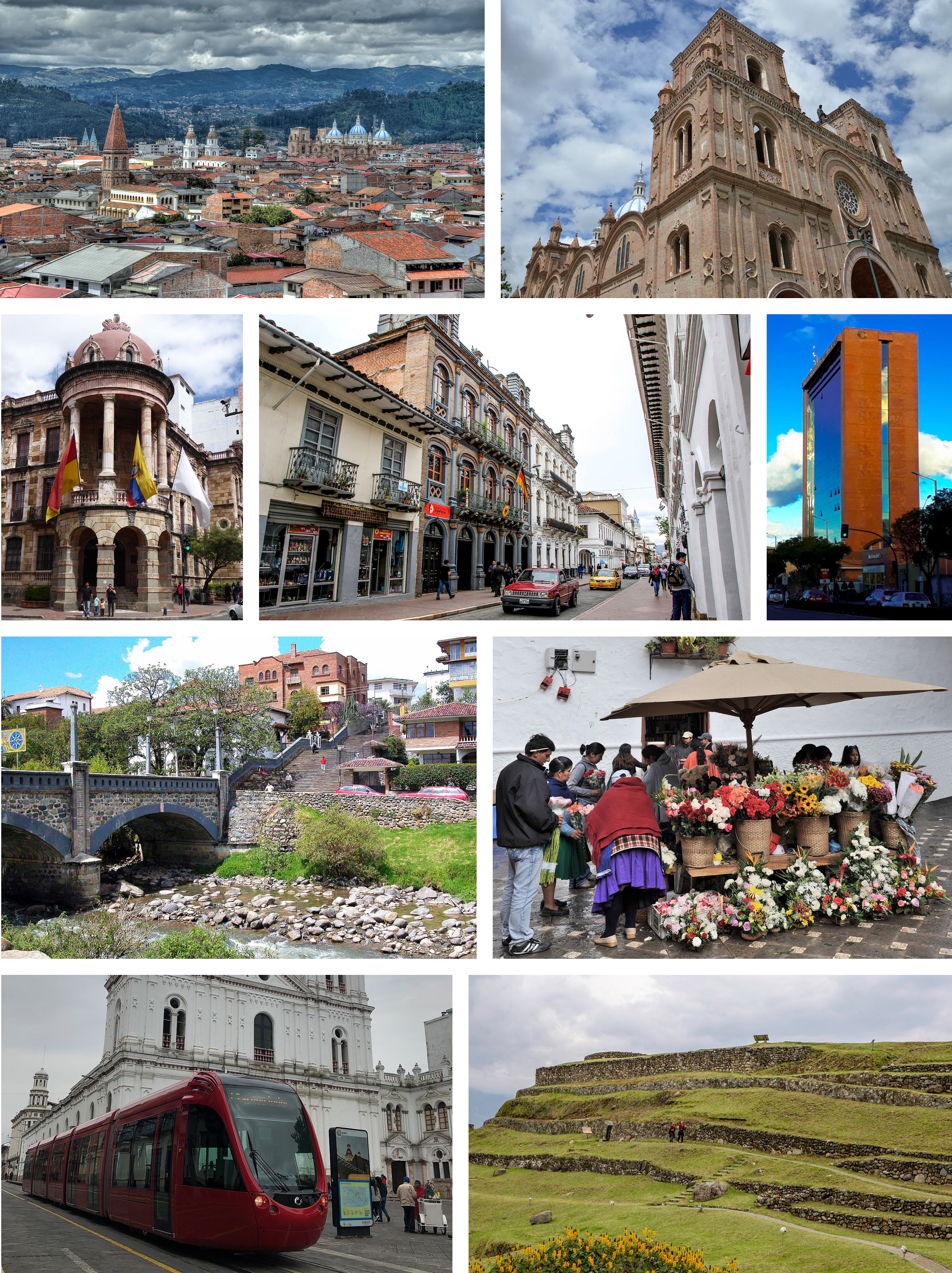
- From top, left to right: Panoramic view of the Historic Center, Cathedral of the Immaculate Conception, City hall of Cuenca, Simon Bolívar Street, Cuenca Chamber of Commerce, Roto Bridge, Flowers Square, Cuenca Tram and archaeological ruins of Pumapungo.

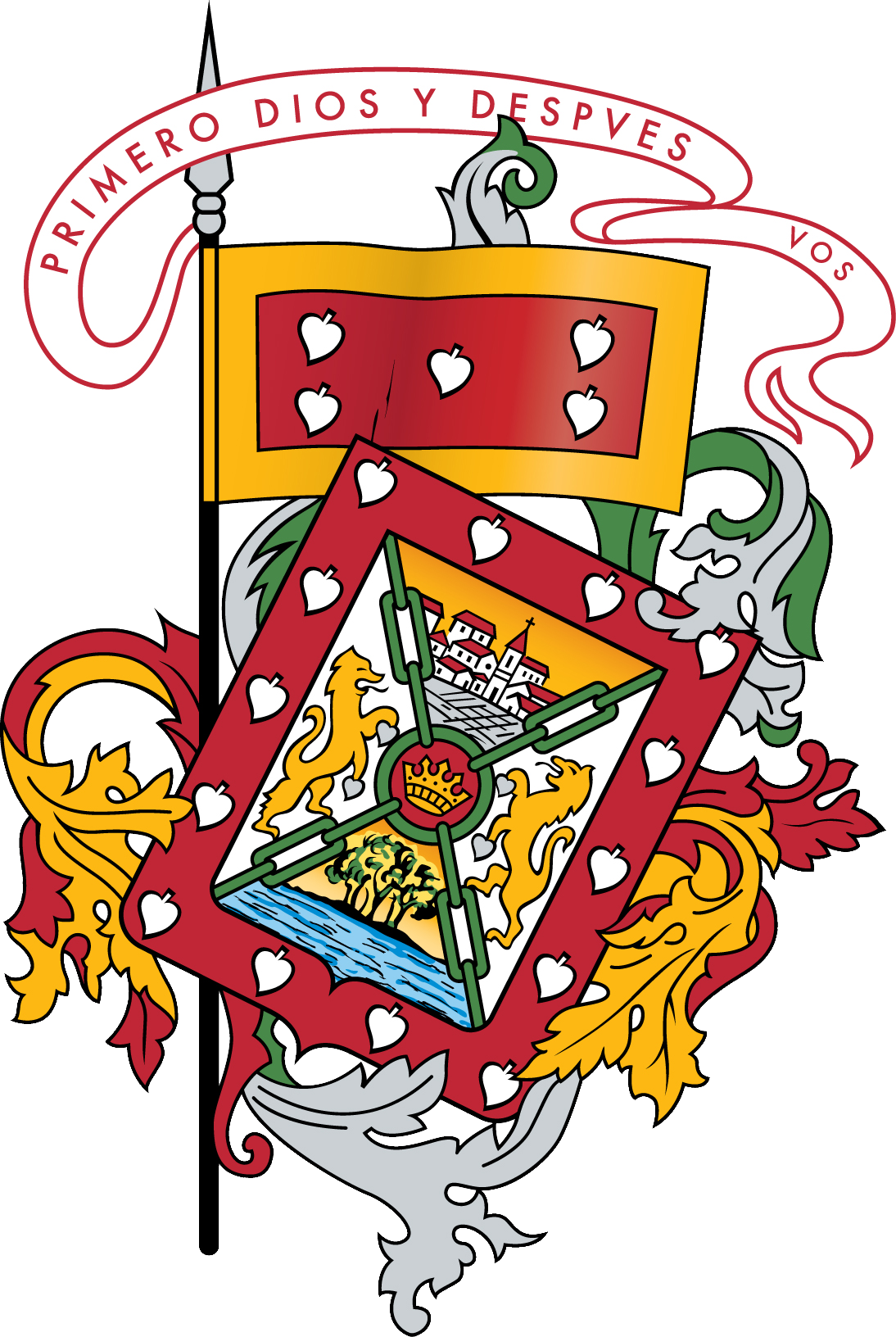
- Flag Coat of arms
- Nickname: Atenas del Ecuador (Athens of Ecuador)
- Location within Ecuador Location within South America
- Coordinates: 2°53′50.69″S 79°00′16.13″W
- Country: Ecuador
- Province: Azuay
- Canton: Cuenca Canton
- Founded: April 12, 1557
- Founder: Gil Ramírez Dávalos
- Named for: Cuenca, Spain
- Parishes: Urban parishes: Bellavista; Cañaribamba; El Batán; El Sagrario; El Vecino; Gil Ramírez Dávalos; Hermano Miguel; Huayna Cápac; Machángara; Monay; San Blas; San Sebastián; Sucre; Totoracocha; Yanuncay

Government
  - Mayor: Cristian Zamora

Area
  - City: 3,195 km^{2} (1,234 sq mi)
  - Urban: 71.45 km^{2} (27.59 sq mi)
  - Canton: 3,195 km^{2} (1,234 sq mi)
- Elevation: 2,560 m (8,400 ft)
- Highest elevation: 2,550 m (8,370 ft)
- Lowest elevation: 2,350 m (7,710 ft)

Population (2022 census)
  - City: 596,101
  - Rank: 3rd in Ecuador
  - Density: 186.6/km^{2} (483.2/sq mi)
  - Urban: 361,524
  - Urban density: 5,060/km^{2} (13,100/sq mi)
- Demonym(s): Cuencan cuencano, -a morlaco, -a (colloquial)

GDP (PPP, constant 2015 values)
  - Year: 2023
  - Total: $6.5 billion
  - Per capita: $14,600
- Time zone: UTC-5 (ECT)
- Postal code: EC010150
- Area code: (+593) 07
- Climate: Marine
- Website: Official website (in Spanish)

Cuenca, officially Santa Ana de los Ríos de Cuenca, is an Ecuadorian city, head of the canton of the same name and capital of the province of Azuay, as well as its largest and most populated city. It is crossed by the Tomebamba, Tarqui, Yanuncay and Machángara rivers, in the south-central inter-Andean region of Ecuador, in the Paute river basin, at an altitude of 2,538 meters above sea level and with a temperate Andean climate averaging 16.3 °C.

It has been locally called "Cuenca of the Andes" or "Athens of Ecuador" for its architecture, its cultural diversity, its contribution to Ecuadorian arts, sciences and literature, and for being the birthplace of many illustrious figures of Ecuadorian society. At the 2022 census it had a population of 596,101 inhabitants, making it the third most populous city in the country behind Guayaquil and Quito. The city is the core of the Cuenca metropolitan area, which is also made up of nearby rural towns and parishes. The conglomerate also ranks third among Ecuador's conurbations.

It was founded on April 12, 1557, on the ruins of the Inca city of Tomebamba (a major administrative center) and the Cañari city of Guapondelig, by Gil Ramírez Dávalos, under orders of the viceroy of Peru Andrés Hurtado de Mendoza. During the 20th century, the city continued to grow, promoting education and culture, and in 1999 its historic center was declared a UNESCO World Heritage Site. It is one of Ecuador's most important administrative, economic, financial and commercial centers. The city's main activities are commerce and industry; in recent years, Cuenca has also established itself as an international tourist attraction.

== Toponymy ==
The city is named Santa Ana de los Ríos de Cuenca in honor of the city of Cuenca in Spain, birthplace of the Spanish viceroy of Peru Andrés Hurtado de Mendoza, who was the one who ordered the Spanish Gil Ramírez Dávalos to found the city and the fact that this place, in its geographical features, is very similar to the Spanish city. Viceroy Andrés Hurtado was also at that time High Guard of the European city of Cuenca, and it was then a gift from the conquistador to the viceroy. In addition, the name "de los Ríos" includes the fact that it is crossed by the rivers: Tomebamba, Tarqui, Yanuncay and Machángara. The rest of the name comes from the Spanish tradition of dedicating new cities to a saint of the Catholic Church, in this case Saint Anne.

== History ==
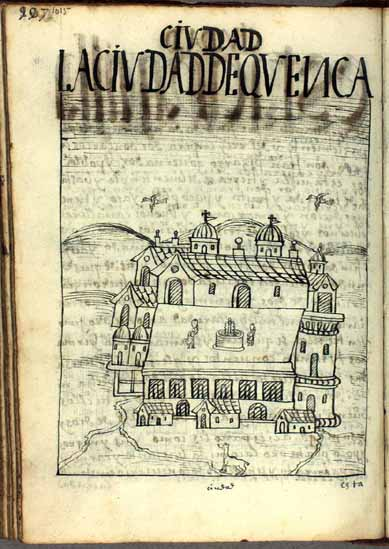
Cuenca in 1615 by the Inca painter Guamán Poma in his work "Nueva corónica y buen gobierno". Royal Library, Denmark.

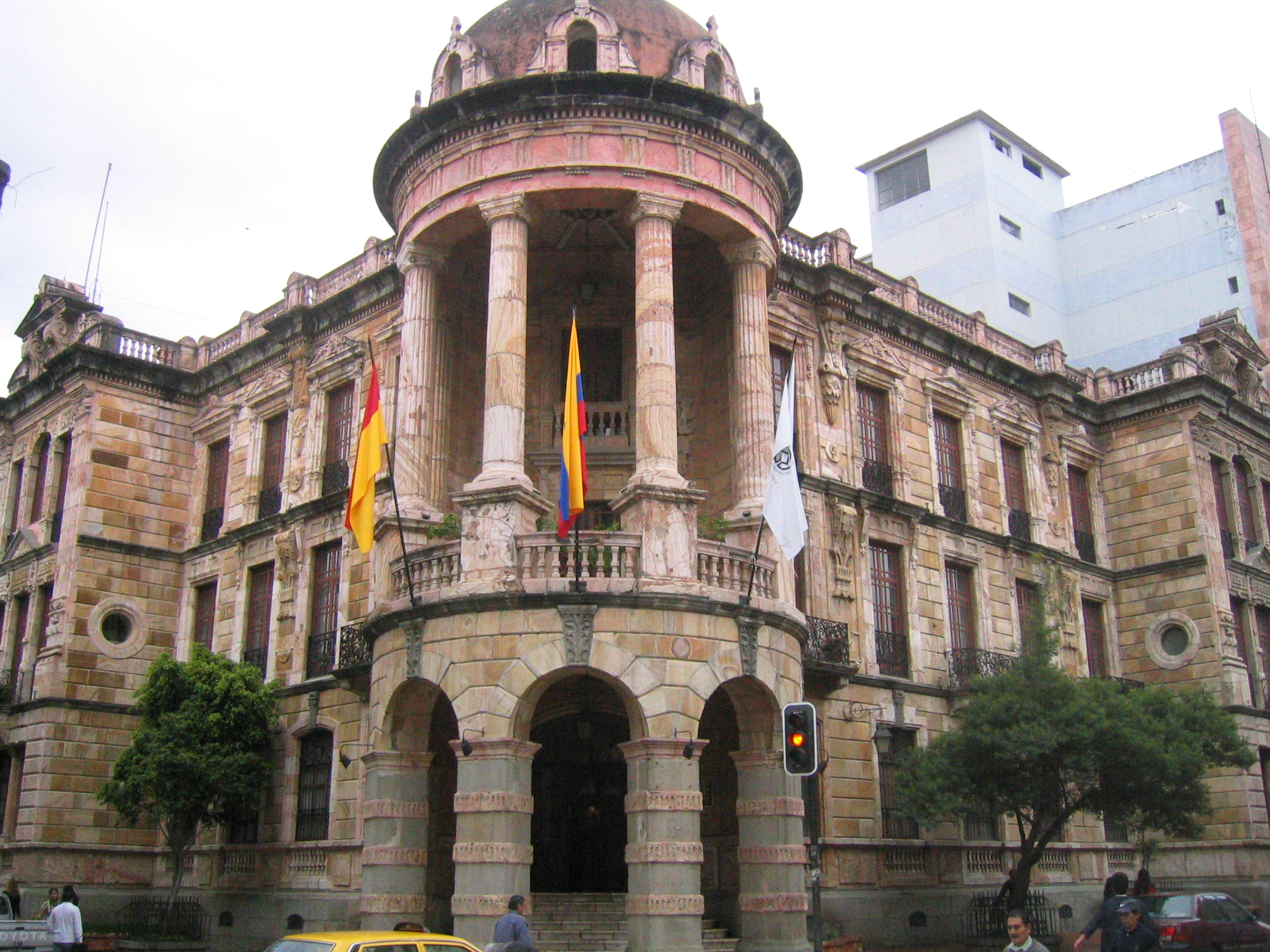
Cuenca City Hall on Bolívar Street

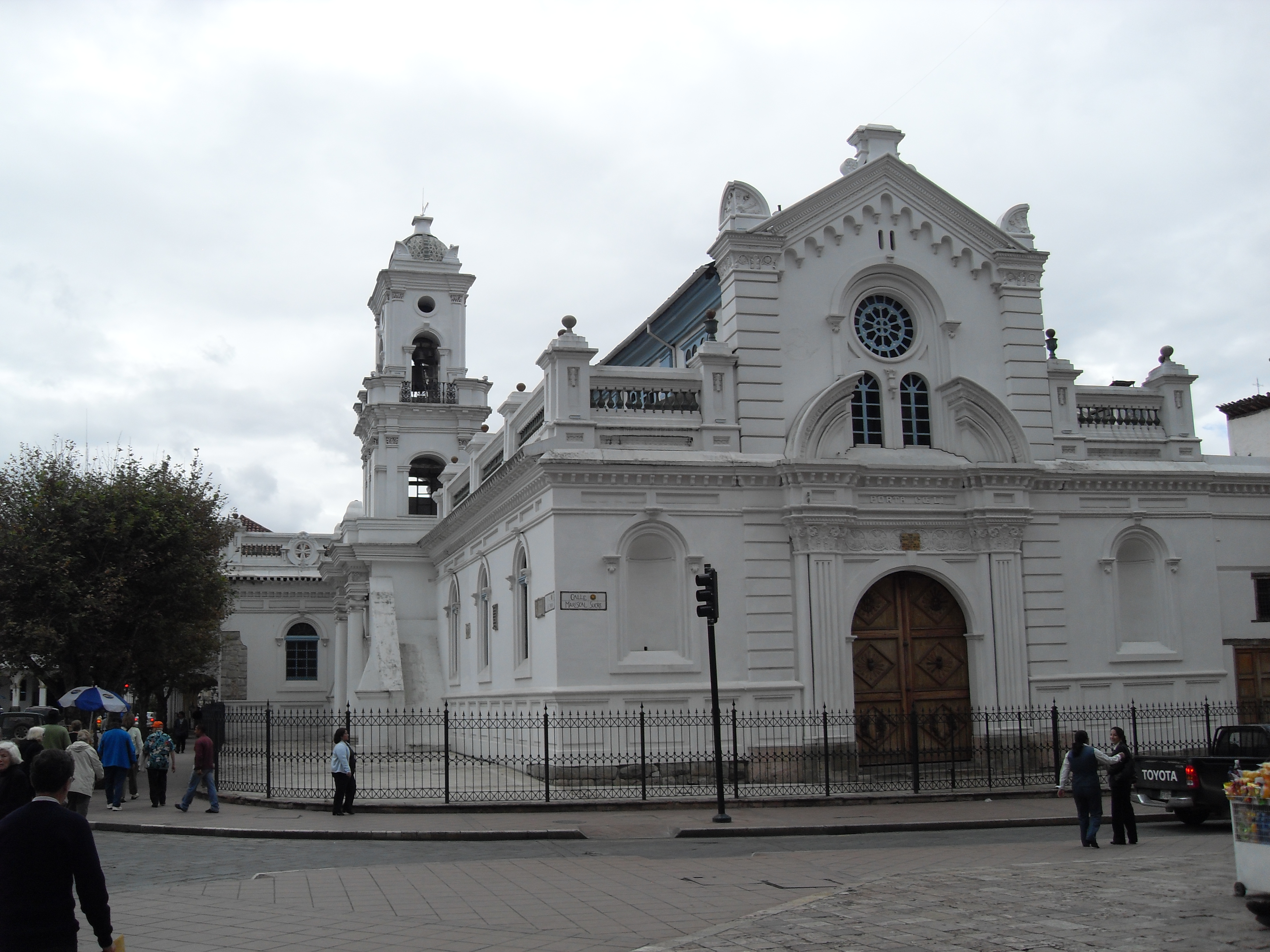
Old Cathedral of Cuenca

“The plateau is a place treasured by empires," comments Jeffrey Herlihy-Mera. "The Cañari then Inca and then Spanish occupied the region in the last two millennia, each renaming it in their own language. Now the capital city is called Cuenca and the province Azuay.”

According to studies and archeological discoveries, the origins of the first inhabitants go back to the year 8060 BC in the Cave of Chopsi. They were hunters, hunting everything the Páramo offered them, and nomads, following the animals and seasons. Their culture is represented by tools such as arrows and spears, which have been found throughout the Andean valley. The culture was most present about 5585 BC.

Later, the early indigenous people used the stable climate, fertile soil, and abundant water to develop agriculture. They grew potatoes, melloco, chocho, squash, and quinoa. They also domesticated animals such as cuys (guinea pigs) and camelids: llamas and alpacas.

Their technology was also advanced. For example, they began creating ceramics. In fact, ceramics constitute the greatest number of artifacts which archeologists use to study their culture. The period from 5000 BCE to 2000 BCE is not well represented in the archeological record. Beginning around 2000 BCE, the people developed a more highly organized society, demonstrating delegated responsibilities, such as the managing of water and control of plagues. People were specialized as administrative and religious authorities (known as shamans). This occurred during the periods of Chaullabamba, Huayco, Pirincay, Monjas, Putushio, Huancarcucho, and Jubones. From then until 500 AD began the periods of Tacalshapa III and the Cañari people, who were absorbed into the Incas in the 15th century.

=== Pre-Columbian society ===
Cuenca was originally a Cañari settlement called Guapdondelic. Archeologists believe Cuenca was founded around 500 AD. The name Guapdondelic translates into 'land as big as heaven'. Less than half a century before the conquistadors landed, the Incas, after a bitter struggle, conquered the Cañari and occupied Guapdondelic and the surrounding area. Though the Incas replaced the Cañari architecture with their own, they did not suppress the Cañari or their impressive achievements in astronomy and agriculture. As was customary for the Incas, they absorbed useful achievements into their culture. They renamed the city Tomebamba. The city became known as the second Cusco, a regional capital.

After the defeat of the Cañari, likely in the 1470s, the Inca emperor, Tupac Yupanqui, ordered the construction of a grand city to be called Pumapungo, "the door of the Puma." Its magnificence was said to have rivaled that of the Inca capital of Cuzco. Indians told stories to the Spanish chroniclers of golden temples and other such wonders, but by the time the Spaniards found the legendary city, all that remained were ruins. They wondered what happened to the fabled splendor and riches of the second Inca capital. After having been abandoned by the Cañari and then the Incas, Tomebamba was sparsely populated until the 1550s.

Tomebamba is considered a candidate for the mythical city of gold which the Spanish called El Dorado. The Spanish thought El Dorado was burned by the inhabitants after they heard of the Spanish conquests. Tomebamba's destruction by its inhabitants prior to the arrival of the Spanish suggests it may have been what the Spanish called El Dorado.

=== Spanish settlement ===
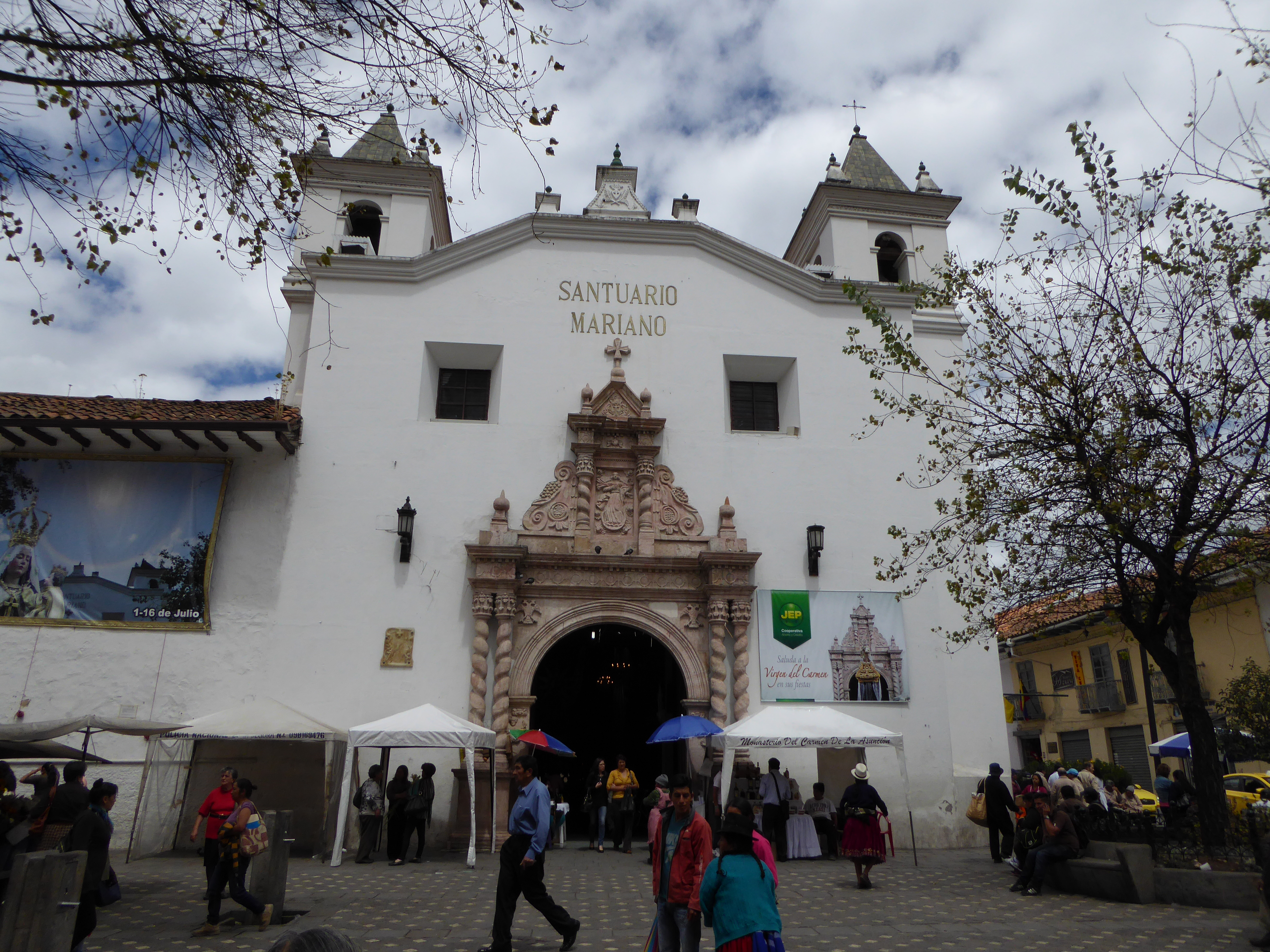
Monastery of Carmen de la Asunción, founded in 1682 for the Order of the Barefoot Carmelites and it was built in 1730.

The Spanish settlement of Cuenca was founded on April 12, 1557, by the explorer Gil Ramírez Dávalos. Andrés Hurtado de Mendoza, then Viceroy of Peru had commissioned the founding and ordered the city named after his home town of Cuenca, Spain. It was founded decades after other major Spanish settlements in the region, such as Quito (1534), Guayaquil (1538), and Loja (1548). Cuenca's population and importance grew steadily during the colonial era.

Cuenca reached the peak of its importance in the first years of Ecuador's independence; Cuenca achieved its independence on November 3, 1820. It became the capital of one of the three provinces that made up the nascent republic. The other two capitals were Guayaquil and Quito.

== Demographics ==
As per the last INEC estimate for 2015, the population of the Cuenca canton was 580,000 inhabitants, of which 400,000 constitute the urban population (i.e., the population of the city proper). Local publications estimate that the expat population is between 4,000 and 6,000. The economic development is based on industry and agricultural development.

The Cuenca Metropolitan Area includes the cities of Azogues, Biblian, and Deleg in the Cañar province and the cities of Paute and Gualaceo in the Azuay province with a population of 730,000 inhabitants; however, Cuenca's influence in the cultural, economic, and educational areas extends to all the remaining cities 50 miles (80 kilometres) around the city.

== Economy ==
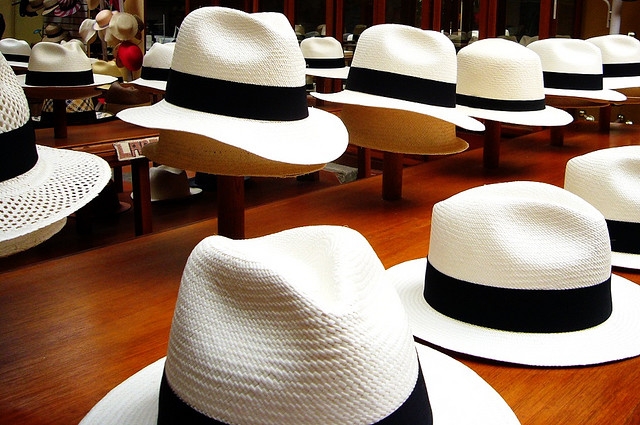
Handwoven toquilla straw hats in a city shop

Cuenca is known for its textiles, furniture, hats, and shoes. The straw hats known around the world as Panama hats are made in Cuenca by local artisans. Cuenca also was a major exporter of flowers to the United States and countries in Europe; however, as other cities have started flower gardens, Cuenca now specializes in orchids. While farming has shrunk in the past years, it is still an important sector of the city's economy, mainly vegetables and corn. Cattle ranching is also an important economic activity. Since Cuenca is located in the Andes mountains surrounded by forested areas nearby, mining and logging are also local industries. Some of the common mined resources are kaolin, plaster, limestone, sand, and carbon. Cuenca has also an important industrial and commercial sector.

Tourism continues to grow: Cuenca has many churches and a well-preserved old town that are a part of the cultural heritage of the city. Near Cuenca some important national parks, including Cajas National Park have been created.

At the turn of the century, the country's economy was affected by the change in currency, from sucre to USD.

== Geography ==
Cuenca, capital of the province of Azuay, is located in the Ecuadorian Sierra of the Andes in the Austro or southern region of Ecuador. It is approximately 470 km south of Quito and 200 km southeast of Guayaquil. The city ranges from 2,350 to 2,550 metres (7,710 to 8,370 feet) above sea level.

The dominant features of the city's geography are also the source of its name in Spanish: the four rivers of Cuenca (meaning a basin made by a confluence of rivers). These rivers are the Tomebamba (named after the Inca culture), Yanuncay, Tarqui and Machangara, in order of importance. The first three of these rivers originate in the Páramo of El Cajas National Park to the west of the city.

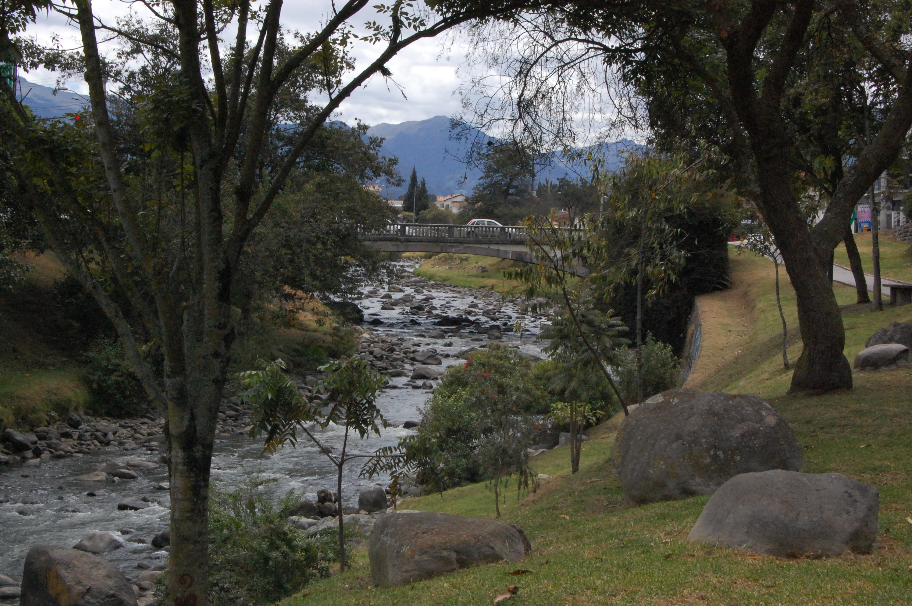
River Tomebamba next to the city centre

=== Parishes ===
Cuenca Canton contains the following parishes:

- Baños
- Chaucha
- Checa (Jidcay)
- Chiquintad
- Cumbe
- Llacao
- Molleturo
- Nulti
- Octavio Cordero Palacios (Santa Rosa)
- Paccha
- Quingeo
- Ricaurte
- San Joaquín
- Santa Ana
- Sayausi
- Sidcay
- Sinincay
- Tarqui
- Turi
- Valle
- Victoria del Portete (Irquis)

=== Climate ===
Cuenca features a subtropical highland climate (Cfb) under the Köppen climate classification. Like the rest of the Ecuadorian Andes, Cuenca enjoys a mild climate year-round. Days are generally warm and nights are cool enough that sweaters or jackets are usually desired. The average daily temperature is 14.7 °C (58.5 °F). There are two seasons: rainy and dry. The dry season, with some variation, falls between June and December. The rainy season, which is characterized by bright sunny mornings and afternoon showers, falls between January and May. The heaviest rains come in the invierno (wet season) of March, April and May.

Climate data for Cuenca, elevation 2,545 m (8,350 ft), (1981–2010 normals, extremes 2012–present)
Month	Jan	Feb	Mar	Apr	May	Jun	Jul	Aug	Sep	Oct	Nov	Dec	Year
Record high °C (°F)	29.3 (84.7)	31.3 (88.3)	29.1 (84.4)	31.8 (89.2)	32.0 (89.6)	29.1 (84.4)	29.5 (85.1)	27.4 (81.3)	31.3 (88.3)	29.0 (84.2)	28.7 (83.7)	28.7 (83.7)	32.0 (89.6)
Mean daily maximum °C (°F)	22.0 (71.6)	21.2 (70.2)	21.4 (70.5)	20.9 (69.6)	20.9 (69.6)	19.8 (67.6)	18.6 (65.5)	19.7 (67.5)	20.3 (68.5)	21.6 (70.9)	22.2 (72.0)	22.0 (71.6)	20.9 (69.6)
Daily mean °C (°F)	16.6 (61.9)	16.3 (61.3)	16.4 (61.5)	16.2 (61.2)	15.9 (60.6)	14.9 (58.8)	13.8 (56.8)	14.6 (58.3)	15.2 (59.4)	16.2 (61.2)	16.2 (61.2)	16.6 (61.9)	15.7 (60.3)
Mean daily minimum °C (°F)	11.2 (52.2)	11.4 (52.5)	11.3 (52.3)	11.4 (52.5)	10.9 (51.6)	10.0 (50.0)	9.0 (48.2)	9.5 (49.1)	10.1 (50.2)	10.7 (51.3)	10.2 (50.4)	11.1 (52.0)	10.6 (51.0)
Record low °C (°F)	3.7 (38.7)	5.6 (42.1)	5.8 (42.4)	3.3 (37.9)	5.1 (41.2)	4.8 (40.6)	3.2 (37.8)	2.7 (36.9)	3.7 (38.7)	4.4 (39.9)	0.5 (32.9)	1.8 (35.2)	0.5 (32.9)
Average precipitation mm (inches)	58.1 (2.29)	85.4 (3.36)	112.8 (4.44)	123.3 (4.85)	85.5 (3.37)	46.9 (1.85)	27.9 (1.10)	19.8 (0.78)	49.7 (1.96)	90.8 (3.57)	86.2 (3.39)	89.8 (3.54)	876.2 (34.5)
Mean monthly sunshine hours	155	113	124	120	155	150	186	186	150	155	150	155	1,799
Source 1: World Meteorological Organization
Source 2: Meteomanz Cuenca Climate Guide

== Education ==
=== Universities ===
The first university in the city, the Universidad de Cuenca, was established in 1867. It is considered the third oldest university of the country, after the Universidad Central del Ecuador (1836) and the Universidad Nacional de Loja (1859). Ever since, the city has been growing and more universities were created with new careers. This led to the declaration of Cuenca as the City of Universities by the National Assembly of Ecuador on January 4, 2011.

The city has the following Universities:

- Universidad de Cuenca (UCUENCA)
- Universidad Politécnica Salesiana (UPS)
- Universidad del Azuay (UDA)
- Universidad Católica de Cuenca (UCACUE)

The first university is classified as an A category university; the subsequent next three are B category. universities This was stated by the Council for Evaluation, Validation and Assurance of the Quality in Superior Education of Ecuador (CEAACES)

=== Primary and secondary schools ===
International schools:

- École Franco-équatorienne Joseph-de-Jussieu (French school)
- Colegio Alemán Stiehle (German school)

== Main sights ==
Historic Centre of Santa Ana de los Ríos de Cuenca
UNESCO World Heritage Site
- The Catedral Nueva
- Interactive map of Historic Centre of Santa Ana de los Ríos de Cuenca
- Criteria: Cultural: ii, iv, v
- Reference: 863
- Inscription: 1999 (23rd Session)
- Area: 224.14 ha (553.9 acres)
- Buffer zone: 1,836.94 ha (4,539.2 acres)

Most tourists visit the historic area, which is a UNESCO World Heritage Site, between the river Tomebamba and the streets of Gran Colombia to the north, General Torres to the west, and Hermano Miguel to the east. This area's compactness, grid-like layout, and numerous readily identifiable monuments make it easy to navigate. Outside this area the city can be confusing, as there are dozens of narrow colonial streets with similar buildings.

Major fiestas of Cuenca come at the time of the "Mass of Children" that is carried out the day of the Arrival of Kings (January 6 - Epiphany Day), or in the commemoration of the independence of the city (November 3), during which processions, cultural acts, and dances are organized. The nearby Cañar plantation (in the county of the same name) features the biggest Inca ruins in Ecuador.

=== Landmarks ===
- Old Cathedral (Iglesia de El Sagrario). Built in 1557, the edifice eventually became too small for the town's attendants. In 1880, a new cathedral was built as the replacement. The old cathedral, no longer consecrated, has been restored and is now used as a museum.
- New Cathedral (official name: Catedral Metropolitana de la Inmaculada Concepción). Its towers are truncated due to a calculation error of the architect. Had it been constructed as planned, the foundation would not bear the weight of the full towers. In spite of the architect's immeasurable mistake, the New Cathedral of Cuenca, completed in 1975, is a monumental work of faith. A combination of Romanesque Revival and Neo-Gothic in style, the church's blue and white domes have become a symbol for the city. Its façade is made of alabaster and local marble, while the floor of the nave is covered with pink marble, brought from Carrara (Italy). At its inauguration, the newly constructed Cathedral could accommodate 9,000 of Cuenca's 10,000 inhabitants at that time.
- Park Abdon Calderon. It is located in the center of Cuenca between the old and new cathedrals. On the park benches, people meet to converse and absorb its tranquility. The municipal offices are located nearby.
- Monastery of El Carmen de Asuncion. In the atrium a colorful flower market supplements the beauty of the church, which was founded in 1682. A sculpted stone façade and a golden pulpit make the church very attractive.
- Monastery and Museum of La Concepcion, with 17th-century tombs and a complete collection of religious art.
- House of the Ecuadorian Culture
- Municipal Museum Remigio Crespo Toral
- Museum of the Central Bank
- Museum of the Aboriginal Cultures
- Church of Santo Domingo
- San Blas
- Turi the Mirador
- Ruinas de todos los santos. In this ancient place, four niches of Inca origin exist. Their form is trapezoidal, and they are built of stone. It includes the remains of a colonial mill.

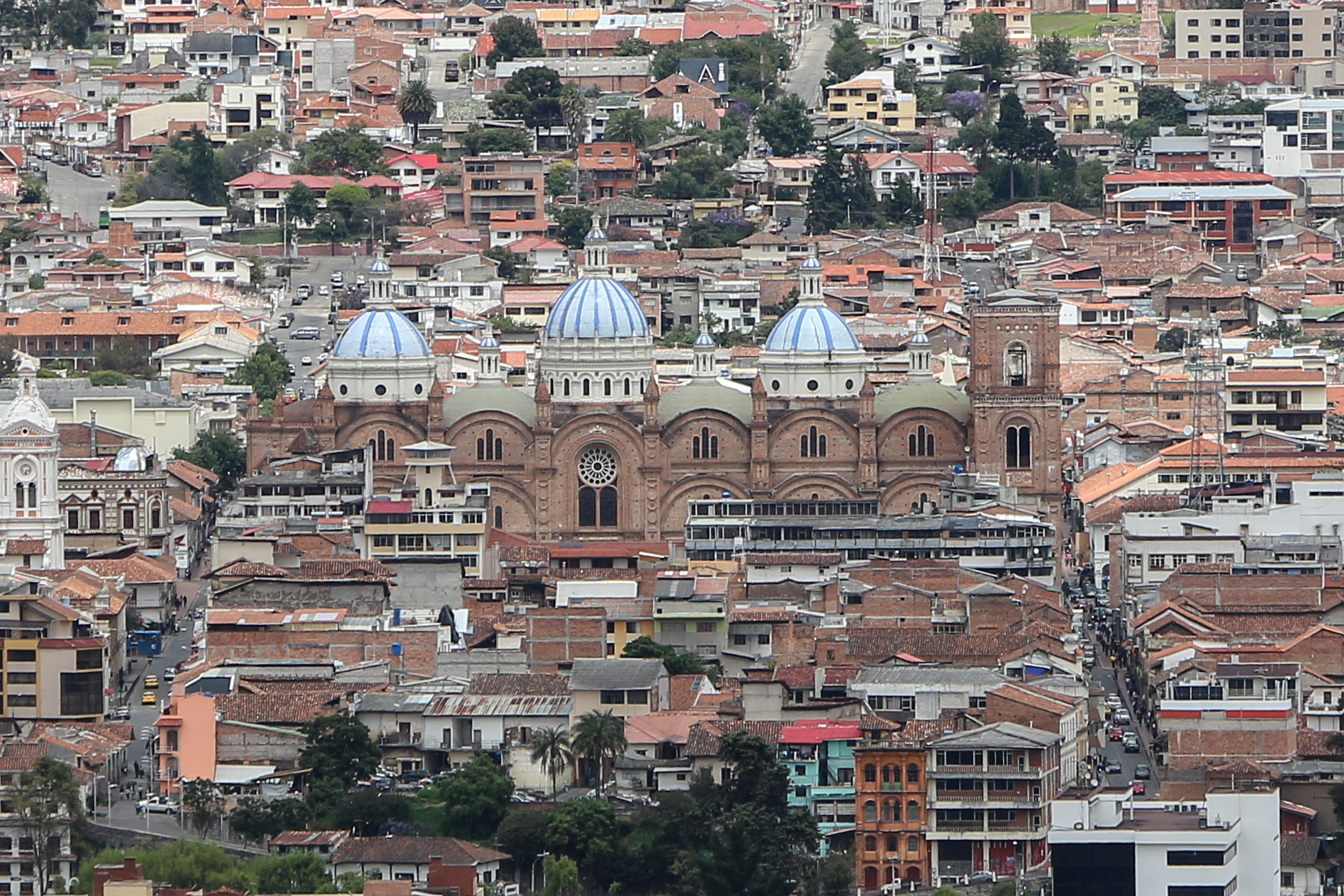
Cathedral of the Immaculate Conception.

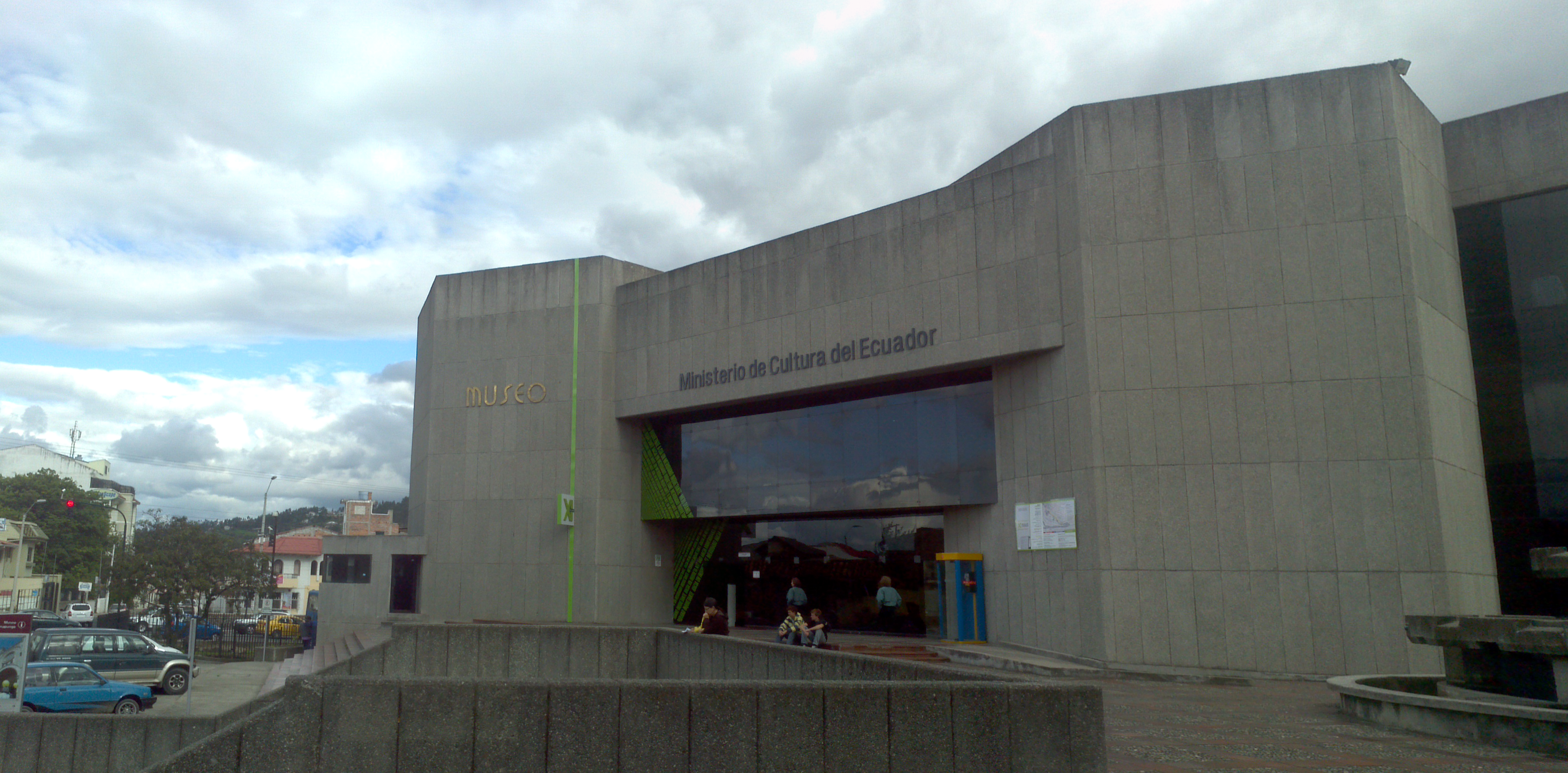
Museo Banco Central Cuenca

=== Surroundings ===
- Molleturo, a vast rural area (about 1,000 square kilometres or 386 square miles) situated in Ecuador's southern Andes, is composed of several little villages (hamlets). The centre of the area is located 1.5 hours away by car from the nearest big city (Cuenca). This distance, however, is very short compared to ten years ago, when there was no road for cars and it took people three days of mule riding to get to Cuenca. In spite of the advantages, the road has also had negative impacts on the ecological system, which is still very important for people's daily survival.
- Jima, located near Cuenca, is a hiking hotspot for southern Ecuador. Jima is located at the base of two beautiful green mountains at 8,800 feet (2,700 metres). Hikes for all skill levels are available, including a three-day hike from the peaks of the Andes mountains down into the lush tropical rainforest of the Amazon basin.
- Gualaceo
- Chordeleg, located less than 50 kilometres (31 miles) from Cuenca, is a town of Cañari origin known for its weavers, embroiderers, and potters. This same area includes a stone corridor in snake form, built in pre-Inca time, known for gold and silver smiths and local jewelry.

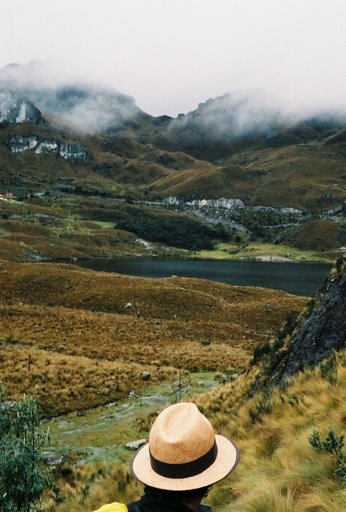
View of Cajas National Park

- El Cajas, a national park with rivers, streams, and lagoons, is located in a region in which the altitude varies from 3,500 to 4,200 metres (11,500 to 13,800 feet) above sea level. It is a place for bird watchers and trout fishermen.

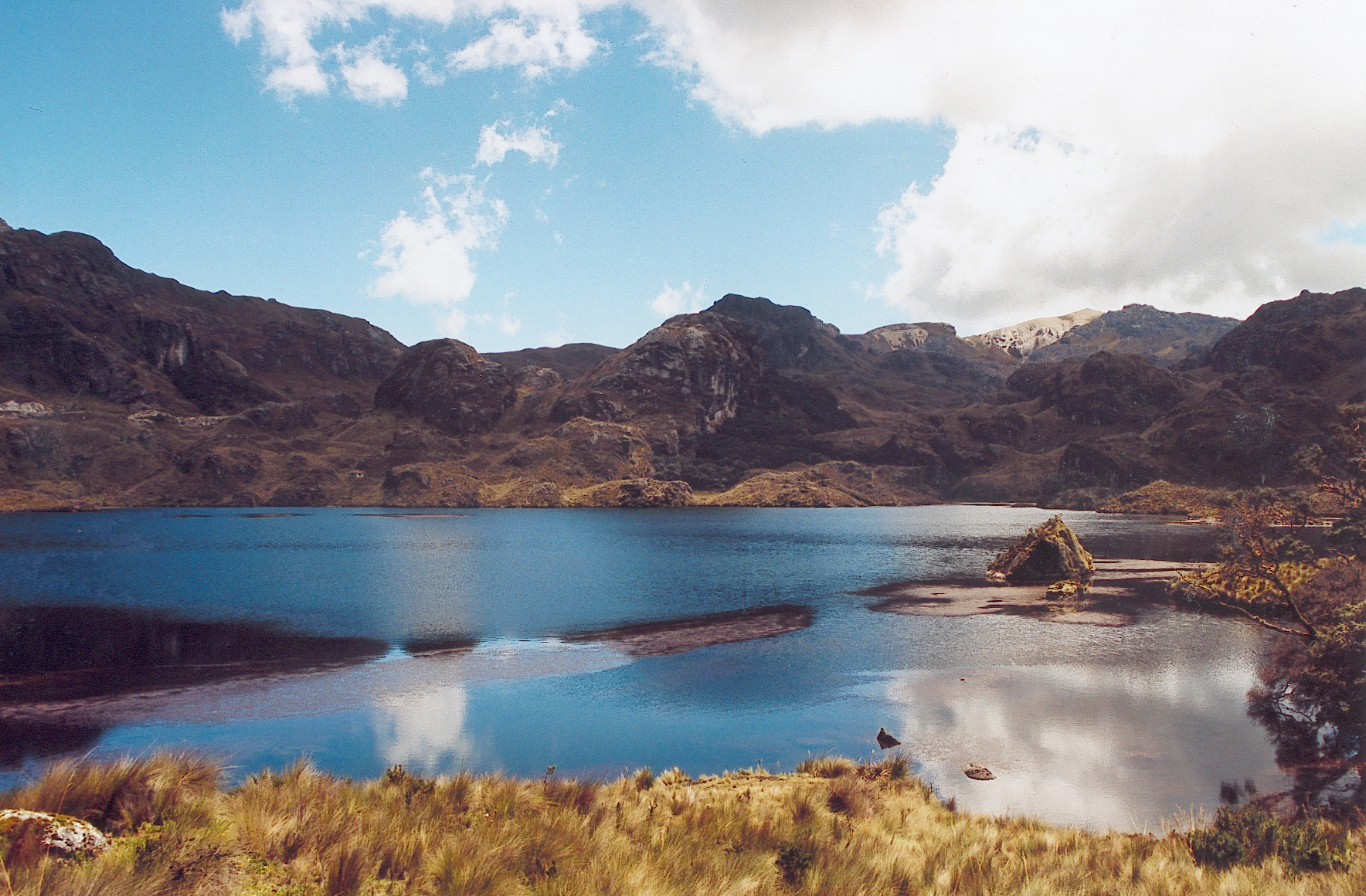
Lacs en miroir (Mirrored lakes) in Cajas National Park

- Azogues, the capital of Cañar Province, is located 29 kilometres (18 miles) from Cuenca. A city with a colonial atmosphere, one of its highlights is San Francisco's convent, built on the summit of a huaca (sacred mountain) of the prehispanic residents.
- Cañar plantation, with a colorful market and the nearby ruins of Ingapirca (Kichwa: "Inca wall"), is located 65 kilometres (40 miles) from Cuenca and is usually the starting point for the trips to the famous ruins that, according to experts, were used to control the native Cañaris. Stores, bathrooms, a tambo for the Inca, and a temple dedicated to the sun are all part of Ingapirca, which was built in the 15th century by orders of Huayna Capac.

== Culture ==
=== Festivities ===
One of the festivities celebrated in Cuenca and in other parts of Ecuador is "El Carnaval." This holiday is celebrated three days prior to Ash Wednesday. Families get together to celebrate what started as a "pagan ritual." Now it is celebrated by wetting friends and random people with water balloons and spraying "Carioca," a nonstaining foam.

Additionally, Cuenca's Independence Day is celebrated at the beginning of November. The festivities span a number of days and consist of various parades, concerts, cultural events, and artisan fairs.

=== Gastronomy ===
The gastronomy of Cuenca shares characteristics with other mountainous parts of Ecuador. As in other regions of Ecuador, cuy (guinea pig) and hornado are popular traditional dishes. Additionally, dishes made from potatoes and corn (different kinds of mote) such as Llapingachos, mote pillo, mote pata, and morocho are popular. Trout, which can be caught in nearby El Cajas National Park, is another popular dish.

In Cuenca, lunch is the largest meal of the day and is typically served in two courses. The first course is soup, which is followed by a plate of stewed or grilled meat and rice.

== Transport ==
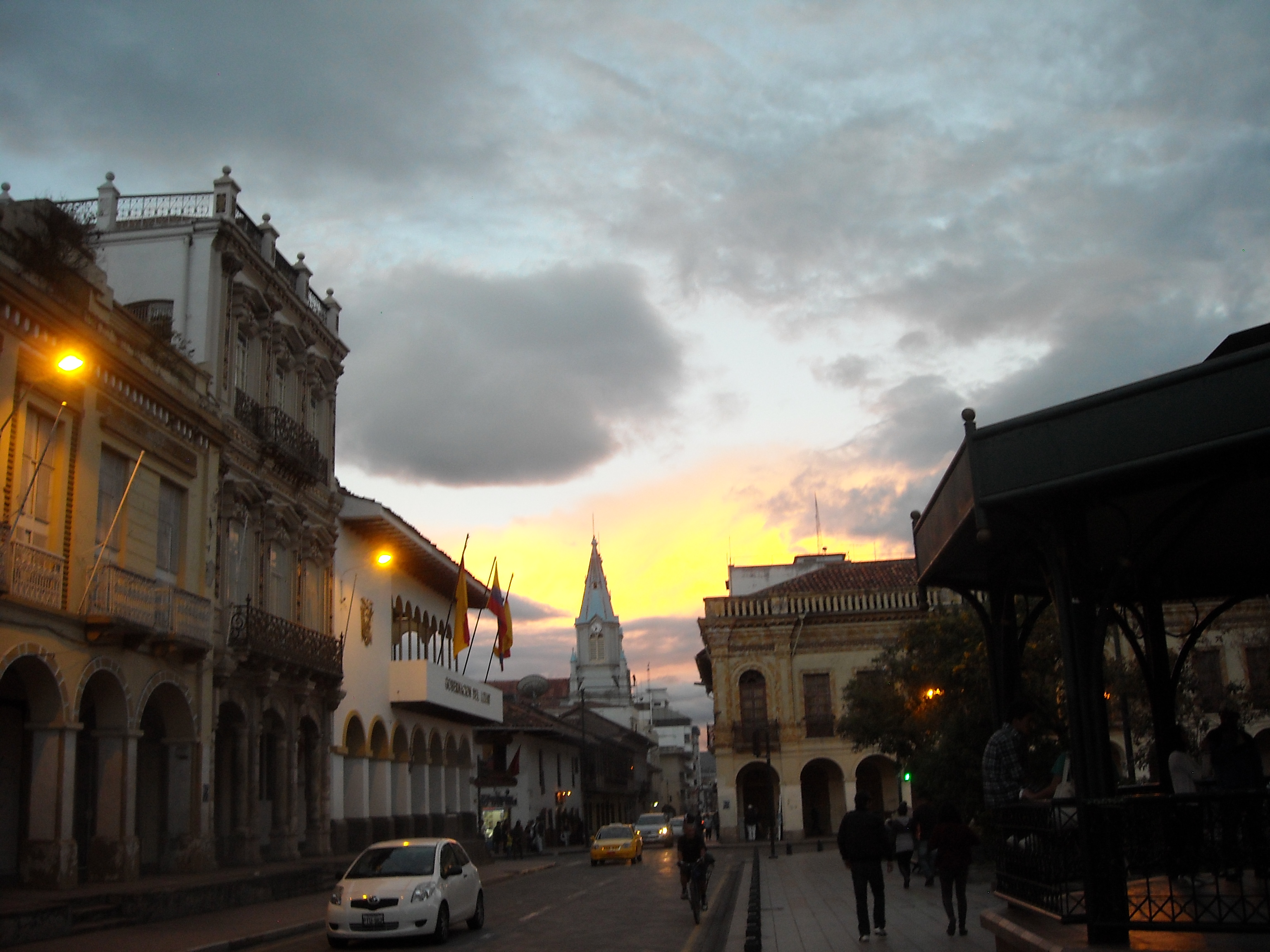
Street view of Simón Bolívar Street, named after Simón Bolívar, next to Calderón Park, in the Historical Center.

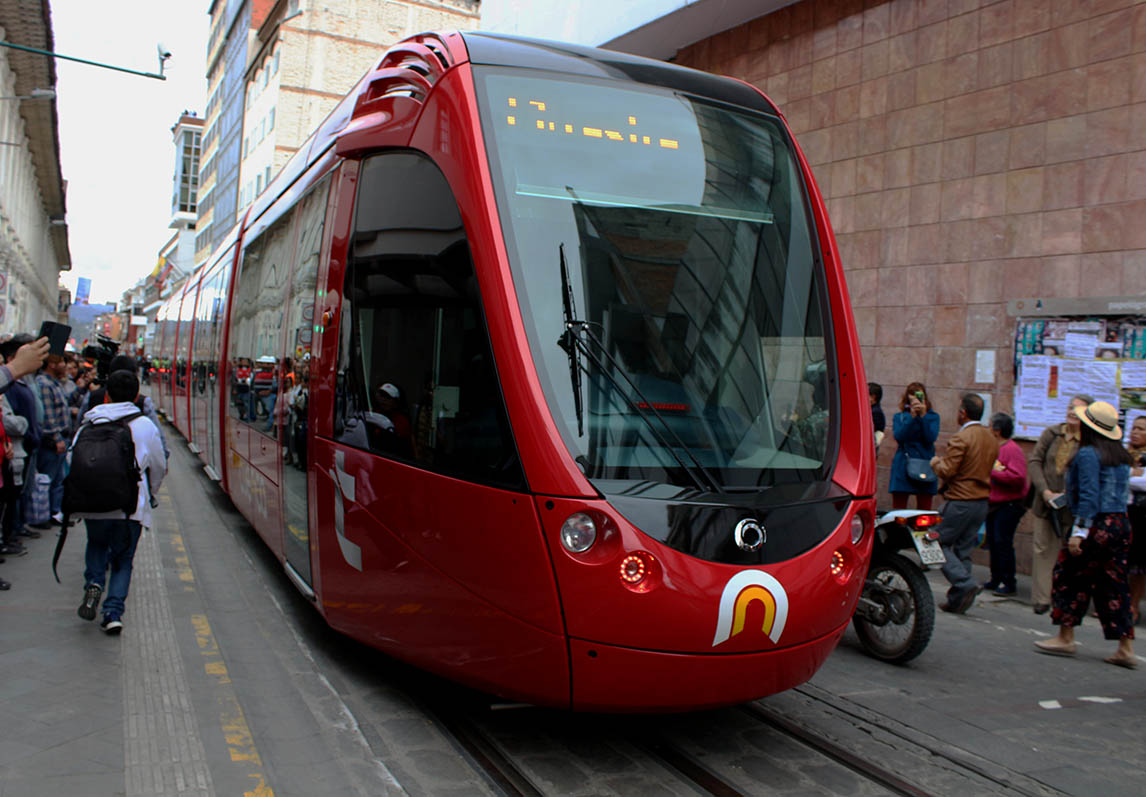
Street view of Tranvía de Cuenca

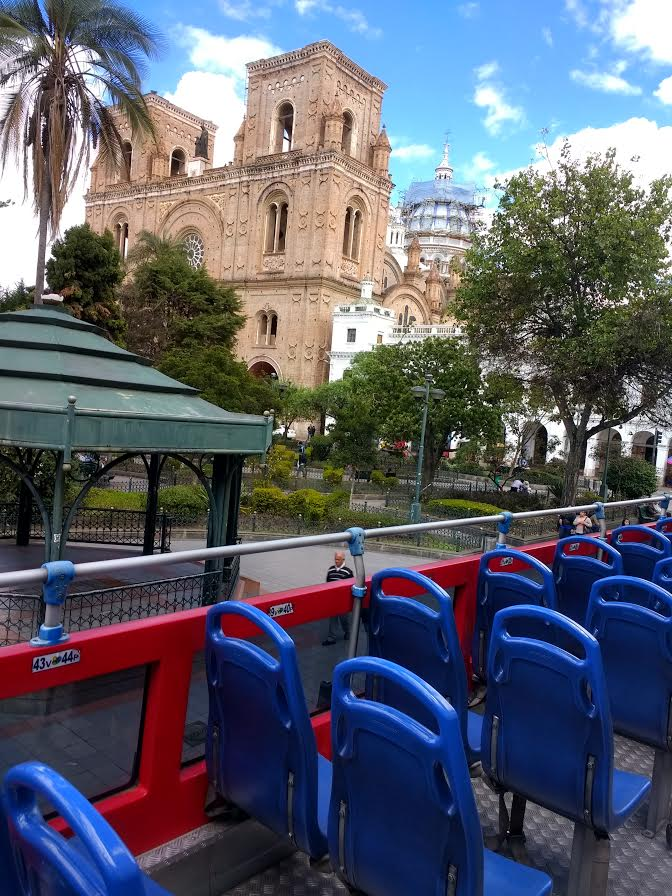
Street view from top deck, 2nd floor view. double decker bus in Cuenca, Ecuador

=== Bus station ===
Cuenca's interprovincial bus station, called the Terminal Terrestre as it is in most cities, is well organized and clean. It is located on Avenida España in the northeastern corner of the city, a twenty-minute walk or a brief taxi ride from the historic center. Also, many city buses provide frequent service as indicated by the "Terminal Terrestre" placard on the windshield.

Buses arrive and depart throughout the day. Service is available to major cities, such as Guayaquil and Quito and also to nearby cities such as Loja, Riobamba, or Machala. The distance to Guayaquil is 243 km. and the bus takes nearly 4 hours on the highway Durán-Pto.Inca-Molleturo (I582W), a scenic ride through the Cajas National Park. Quito is 497 km from Cuenca, and the trip takes around 10 hours on the Pan-American Highway (I35N). Many prefer to travel by bus at night. Those who choose to travel overnight should exercise caution due to reported bus hijacks, which have resulted in armed robbery.

=== Airport ===
The airport, Aeropuerto Mariscal Lamar (Mariscal Lamar International Airport), is due east of the Terminal Terrestre (bus station) on Avenida España. It is a five-minute walk from the bus station. Two airlines currently serve Cuenca: Avianca Ecuador and LATAM Ecuador both fly to Quito. It is Ecuador's third-busiest airport, with over 1,400,000 passengers passing through its gates every year.

=== Tram ===
A tram/light rail line, the Transvia, was completed in early 2019, and the tramway opened May 25, 2020. The line runs a total of 10.5 km.(7 miles) with 27 stations, starting at Cuenca Industrial Park in the north, crossing the Historic Center of Cuenca, and ending south at the entrance to Baños.

=== Cuenca public transportation statistics ===
According to the Moovit Public Transport Index, Cuenca's bus system compares extremely favorably with other cities in Latin America. The average amount of time people spend commuting with public transit in Cuenca, for example to and from work, is 51 minutes on a weekday, with only 7% of public transit riders riding for more than 2 hours every day. The average amount of time people wait at a bus stop or bus station for public transit is 11 minutes, while a mere 9% of riders wait for over 20 minutes on average every day. The average distance people usually ride in a single trip with public transit is 3.8 km, while 0% travel for over 12 km in a single direction. In 2018, the flat-rate bus fare is 30 US cents, with fares for children, students, seniors, and the disabled costing only 15 US cents.

== Twin towns – Sister cities ==
Cuenca is twinned with:

- Rosario, Argentina.
- Xi'an, China.
- La Habana, Cuba.
- Azogues, Ecuador.
- Ecatepec de Morelos, Mexico.
- Guanajuato, Mexico.
- (Mexico) Puebla de Zaragoza, México.
- Cusco, Peru.
- Cuenca, Spain.
- Tempe, Arizona, United States
- Peekskill, New York, United States
- Mérida, Venezuela.

== See also ==
- Archdiocese of Cuenca
- Cuenca Pride
- February 2021 Ecuadorian prison riots
