= Palenque language =

Palenque language may refer to:

- the Pantágora language, which is unclassified
- Palenquero, a Spanish-based creole
- the Cumanagoto language
