= Catarama River (Ecuador) =

River in Ecuador

The Catarama River is a river in Ecuador.

== See also ==
- List of rivers of Ecuador
