= Guayllabamba River =

River of Ecuador

Coordinates: 0°20′20″N 79°28′01″W

The Guayllabamba is a river that originates in the east of Pichincha in northern Ecuador and flows into the Esmeraldas River. The river is named after the Guayllabamba plain.
