= Aguarico River =

River in Ecuador

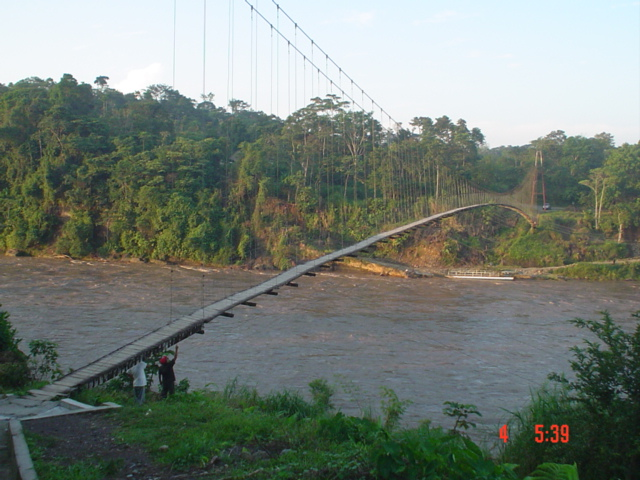
- A pedestrian suspension bridge crossing the Aguarico

Location
- Countries: Ecuador; Peru

Physical characteristics
- Mouth: Napo River
  - coordinates: 0°58′26″S 75°11′49″W
- Length: 390 km (240 mi)

The Aguarico River (Spanish: Río Aguarico, meaning "rich water") is a river in northeastern Ecuador. It is the main river of the Sucumbíos province. In the last part of its course it marks the Ecuadorian-Peruvian border. It empties into the Napo River. It has a length of 390 km (240 mi), of which the last 50 km (31 mi) extend along the natural border between Ecuador and Peru (in the department of Loreto). The lower course of the Aguarico River was finalized and legally demarcated as part of the long-disputed Ecuador-Peru frontier according to The Rio de Janeiro Protocol of 1942. Ecuador unilaterally denounced the protocol in 1960, however a new agreement was signed in 1999, validating the pre-existing protocol.

The Aguarico river flows almost completely by the province of Sucumbíos, in the north of Ecuador, being the main river of the province. In its average course, it flows near the Reserve of Production Faunística Cuyabeno. In the last part of its course, it flows near the Ecuadorian-Peruvian border. Finally it ends at the Napo river, in the same border, a little over the locality the town of Pantoja in Loreto, Peru.

== History ==
In 1541, Gonzalo Pizarro and Francisco de Orellana constructed a sailboat, the San Pedro, and followed the courses of the Coca River and the Napo River until the confluence of the Napo with the Aguarico River and the Curaray River, where they lacked the proper amount of provisions and supplies, including food. Several men did not survive, and it is estimated that 140 of 220 Spaniards and 3,000 of the 4,000 Indians who composed the expedition were amongst this number. They decided then (22 February 1542) that Orellana would continue down the Aguarico River in search of food. They accompanied about fifty men to go with him. Incapable to overcome the river, Orellana waited for Pizarro. Finally Pizarro sent three men with a message to Orellana for him to begin the construction of a new boat, the Victoria. Meanwhile, Pizarro had returned towards Quito by another route towards the north, with only 80 men, those of which that remained alive.

== Indigenous tribes ==
In the highest part of the Aguarico River live the indigenous Siona. The Siona peoples belong to the western Tucanoan language family, and their official languages are the Piohe (or Pioche) dialects and Spanish as well as a mixture of the two, which is sometimes called Pioche-Siona. At present they are a group of approximately 172 people united in 51 families. Their economic activities are based mainly on hunting, fishing and sometimes tourism. Some of the problems that the community must face in the present era are environmental contamination and the over-exploitation of lumber.

== See also ==
- Aguarico River Bridge
