= Siskin =

A Eurasian siskin Spinus spinus giving 'siskin' calls

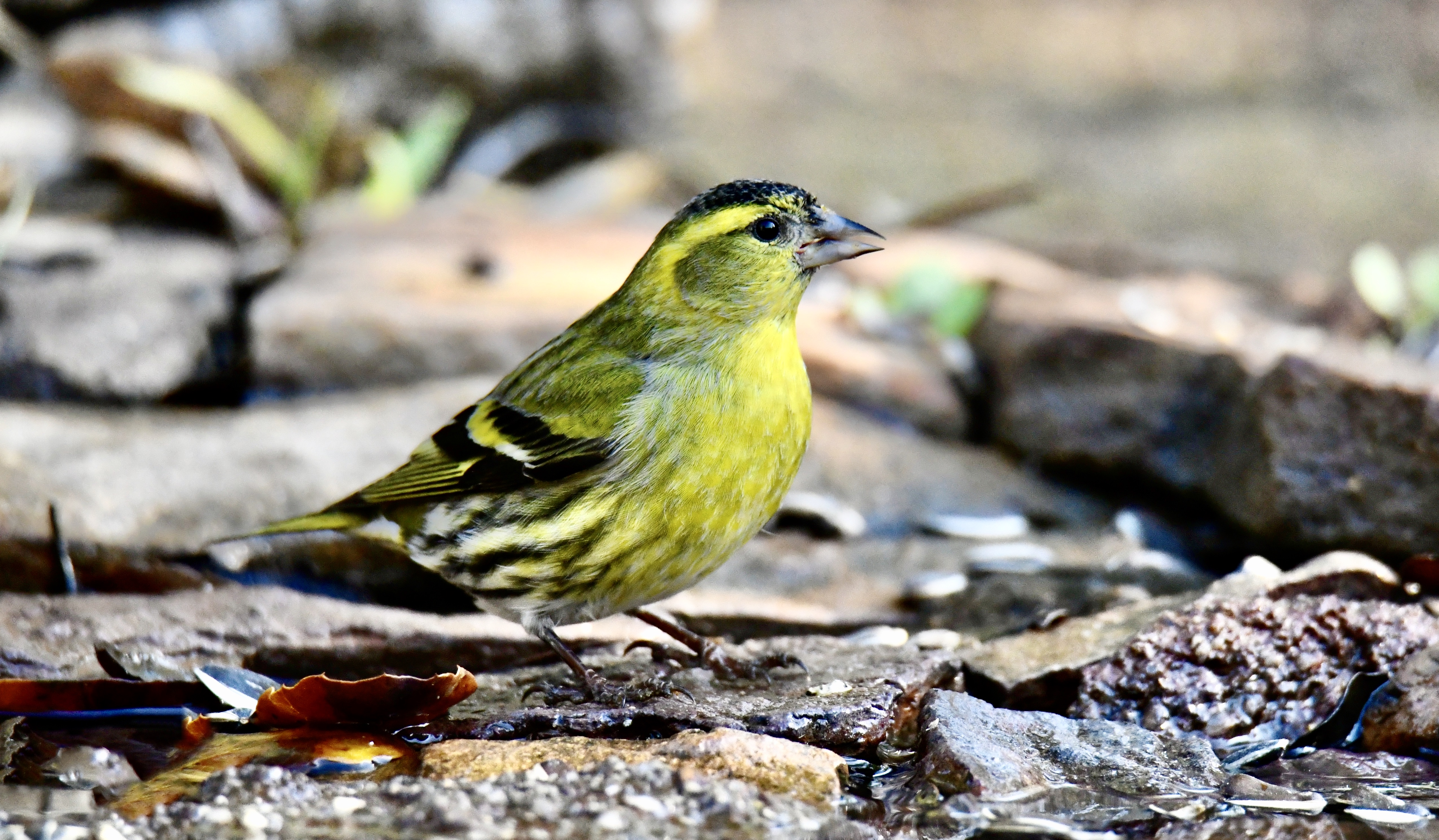
A Eurasian siskin Spinus spinus

The name siskin when referring to a bird is derived from an adaptation of the German dialect words sisschen, zeischen, which are diminutive forms of Middle High German (zîsec) and Middle Low German (ziseke, sisek) words, with cognates in Slavic languages, cf. Czech čížek; these names are of onomatopoeic origin. The name siskin was first recorded in written English in 1544 in William Turner's Avium praecipuarum, quarum apud Plinium et Aristotelem mentio est, brevis et succincta historia, referring to the Eurasian siskin Spinus spinus.

Spinus

- Andean siskin Spinus spinescens
- Antillean siskin Spinus dominicensis
- Black siskin Spinus atratus
- Black-capped siskin Spinus atriceps
- Black-chinned siskin Spinus barbatus
- Black-headed siskin Spinus notatus
- Eurasian siskin Spinus spinus
- Hooded siskin Spinus magellanicus
- Olivaceous siskin Spinus olivaceus
- Pine siskin Spinus pinus
- Red siskin Spinus cucullatus
- Saffron siskin Spinus siemiradzkii
- Thick-billed siskin Spinus crassirostris
- Yellow-bellied siskin Spinus xanthogastrus
- Yellow-faced siskin Spinus yarrellii
- Yellow-rumped siskin Spinus uropygialis

Crithagra and Serinus

- Cape siskin Crithagra totta
- Drakensberg siskin Crithagra symonsi
- Ethiopian siskin Serinus nigriceps
