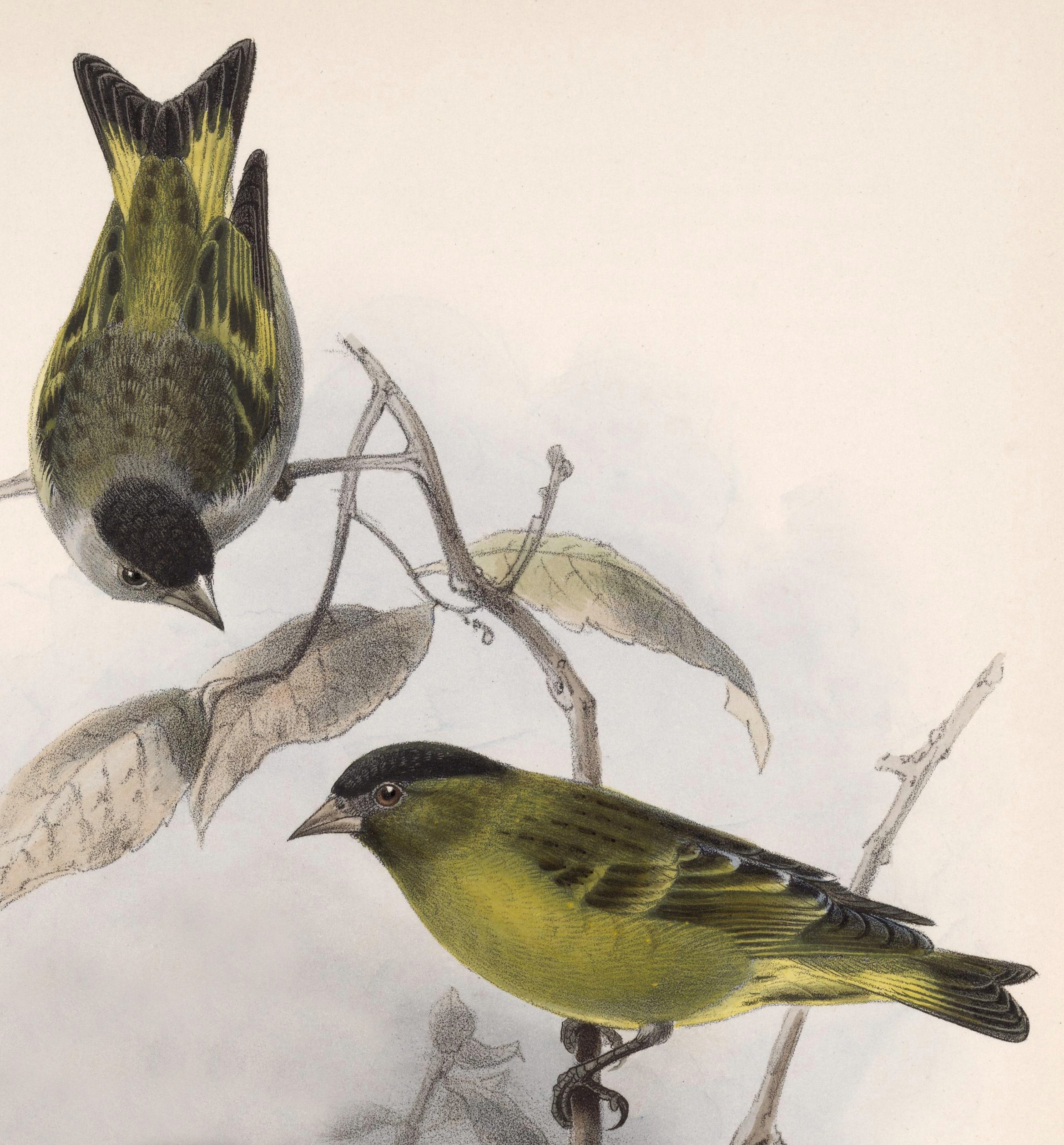

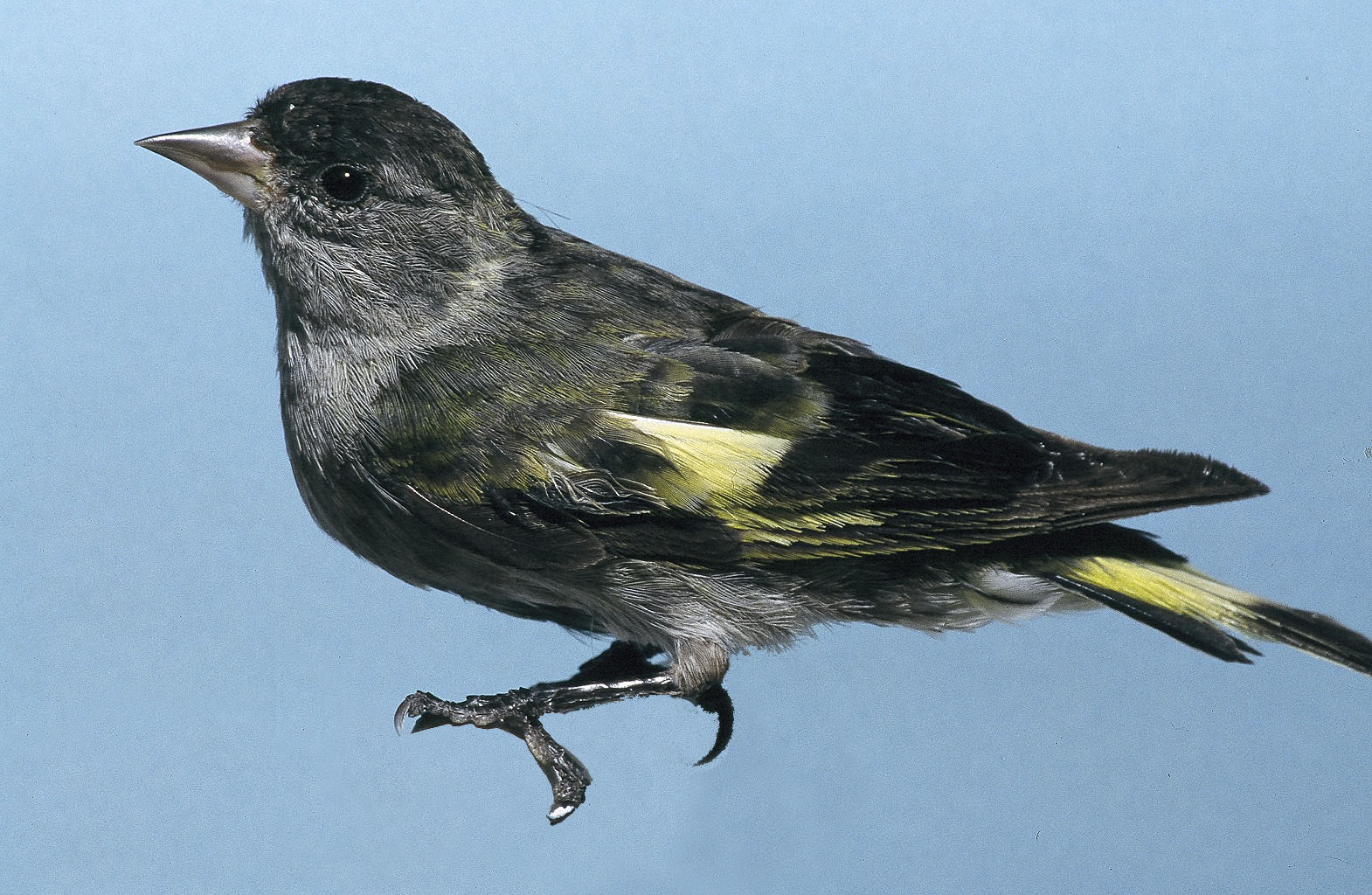
- Male

Conservation status
- Least Concern (IUCN 3.1)

Scientific classification
- Kingdom: Animalia
- Phylum: Chordata
- Class: Aves
- Order: Passeriformes
- Family: Fringillidae
- Subfamily: Carduelinae
- Genus: Spinus
- Species: S. atriceps

Binomial name
- Spinus atriceps (Salvin, 1863)

Synonyms
- See text

= Black-capped siskin =

Species of bird

The black-capped siskin (Spinus atriceps) is a species of bird in the family Fringillidae, the finches and euphonias. It is found in Mexico and Guatemala.

== Taxonomy and systematics ==
The black-capped siskin has a complicated taxonomic history. It was originally described in 1863 with the binomial Chrysomitris atriceps. It was later moved to what was then the subgenus Spinus within genus Carduelis. Beginning in about 2009 the subgenus was elevated to full genus level and the black-capped siskin, the rest of the New World siskins, and the goldfinches were therefore elevated to now-genus Spinus.

The black-capped siskin is monotypic. It has hybridized with the pine siskin (S. pinus).

== Description ==
The black-capped siskin is 11 to 13 cm (4.3 to 5.1 in) long. One male weighed 12.5 g (0.44 oz) and one female14.5 g (0.51 oz). The species is sexually dimorphic. Adult males have black lores, forehead, and crown. Their chin and throat are blackish and the rest of their head is dark greenish olive. Their nape is deep green and their back and rump a lighter green. Their tail feathers are mostly black or blackish with thin bright yellowish green edges and bright yellow bases on the outermost pair. Their wings have a complicated pattern. Their median coverts are bright olive-green. Their greater coverts have blackish bases and wide olive-green tips. Their primaries and secondaries are black with thin greenish yellow edges and their tertials are black with olive-green edges and whitish buff tips. Their underparts are mostly dull green that is more yellowish on the belly and undertail coverts. Adult females have a duller head and upperparts than males. Their cap is sooty black or blackish brown. Their back and scapulars are deep olive-green with wide darker stripes. Their rump is pale green and their uppertail coverts are duller green or greenish olive. Their tail and wings are like the male's. Their underparts are a duller green than the male's, with a whiter belly and undertail coverts and faint dark streaks on the throat and breast. Both sexes have a black iris, a pale pink bill, and grayish or dark horn-brown legs and feet. Juveniles do not have a dark cap. Their upperparts are buffish brown with darker streaking than adults' except on the rump and uppertail coverts. Their underparts are mostly pale buffish or yellowish buff with thin dark brown streaks on the sides of the neck and the upper breast.

== Distribution and habitat ==
The black-capped siskin has a disjunct distribution. It is found in the southeastern Mexican state of Chiapas and separately from there into western Guatemala. It primarily inhabits pine-oak, oak, and alder forests. It also is found in pine savanna, pastures, and agricultural areas. Sources differ on its overall elevational range. One states it is 2,300 to 3,100 m (7,500 to 10,200 ft) and another 2,350 to 3,500 m (7,700 to 11,500 ft). A third places it between 1,600 to 3,100 m (5,200 to 10,200 ft) in Guatemala.

== Behavior ==
=== Movement ===
The black-capped siskin is believed to be a sedentary year-round resident.

=== Feeding ===
The black-capped siskin feeds mostly on seeds. It forages in pair or small flocks, and in the non-breeding season larger ones, and on the ground and through all levels of trees.

=== Breeding ===
Nothing is known about the black-capped siskin's breeding biology.

=== Vocalization ===
The black-capped siskin's song is "a varied buzzy, tinkling, liquid warble". Its calls include a "buzzy tzzzeeeeee!", a "tzeep! or double-noted tzeep-cheet!", and a "chit'chit'chit'chit'chit" chatter.

== Status ==
The IUCN has assessed the black-capped siskin as being of Least Concern. Its estimated population of between 20,000 and 50,000 mature individuals is believed to be decreasing. No immediate threats have been identified. It is considered "uncommon or scarce" overall and uncommon in Guatemala.
