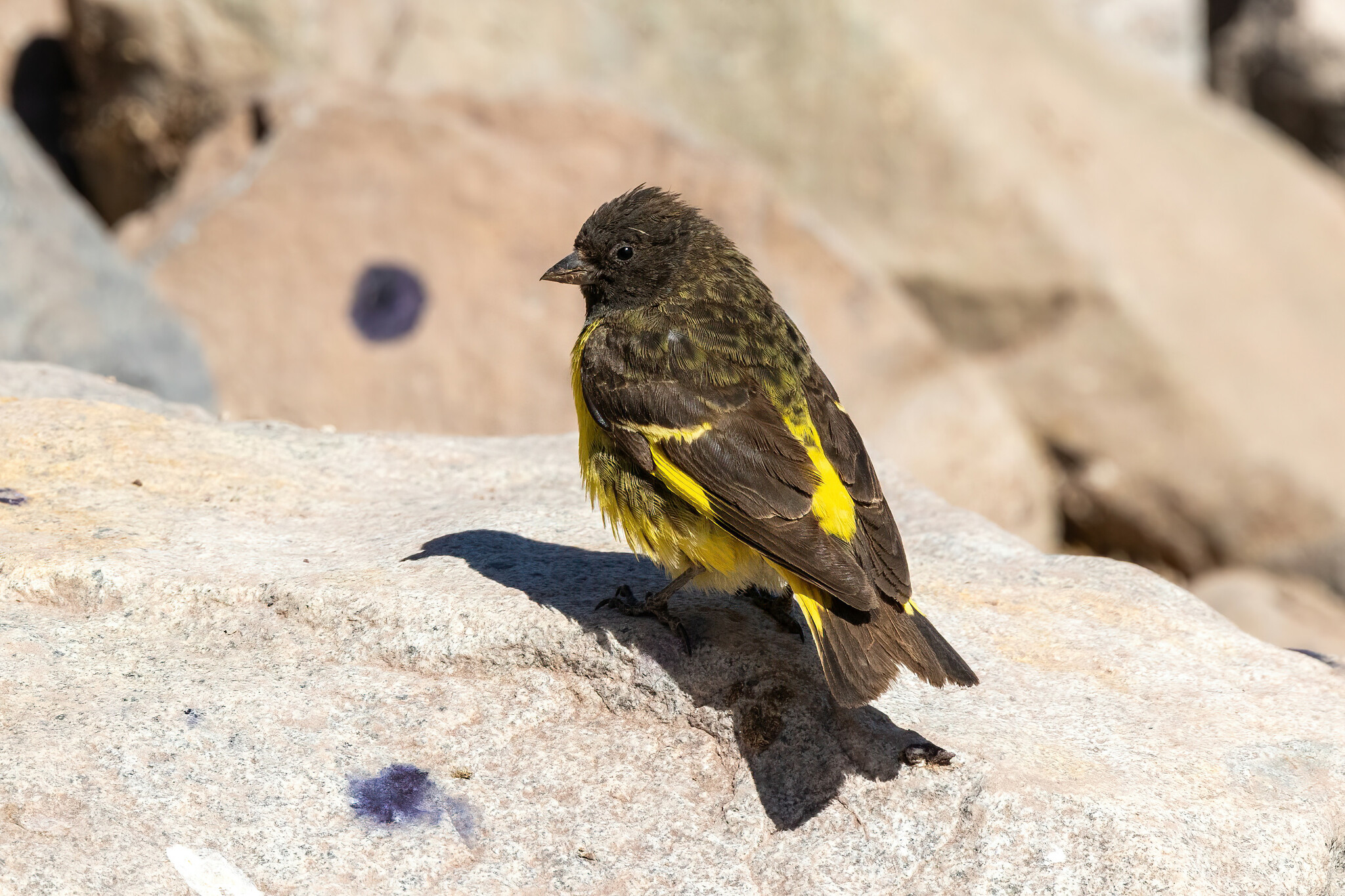

Conservation status
- Least Concern (IUCN 3.1)

Scientific classification
- Kingdom: Animalia
- Phylum: Chordata
- Class: Aves
- Order: Passeriformes
- Family: Fringillidae
- Subfamily: Carduelinae
- Genus: Spinus
- Species: S. uropygialis

Binomial name
- Spinus uropygialis (Sclater, PL, 1862)
- Breeding Non-Breeding

Synonyms
- Sporagra uropygialis Carduelis uropygialis

= Yellow-rumped siskin =

Species of bird

The yellow-rumped siskin (Spinus uropygialis) is a species of bird in the family Fringillidae, the finches and euphonias. It is found in Argentina, Bolivia, Chile, and Peru.

== Taxonomy and systematics ==
The yellow-rumped siskin was originally described in 1862 with the binomial Chrysomitris uropygialis. It was later moved to what was then the subgenus Spinus within genus Carduelis and also spent time in genus Sporagra. Beginning in about 2009 the subgenus was elevated to full genus level and the yellow-rumped siskin, the rest of the New World siskins, and the New World goldfinches were therefore elevated to now-genus Spinus.

The yellow-rumped siskin is monotypic. It is believed to hybridize with the hooded siskin (S. magellanicus) in Peru.

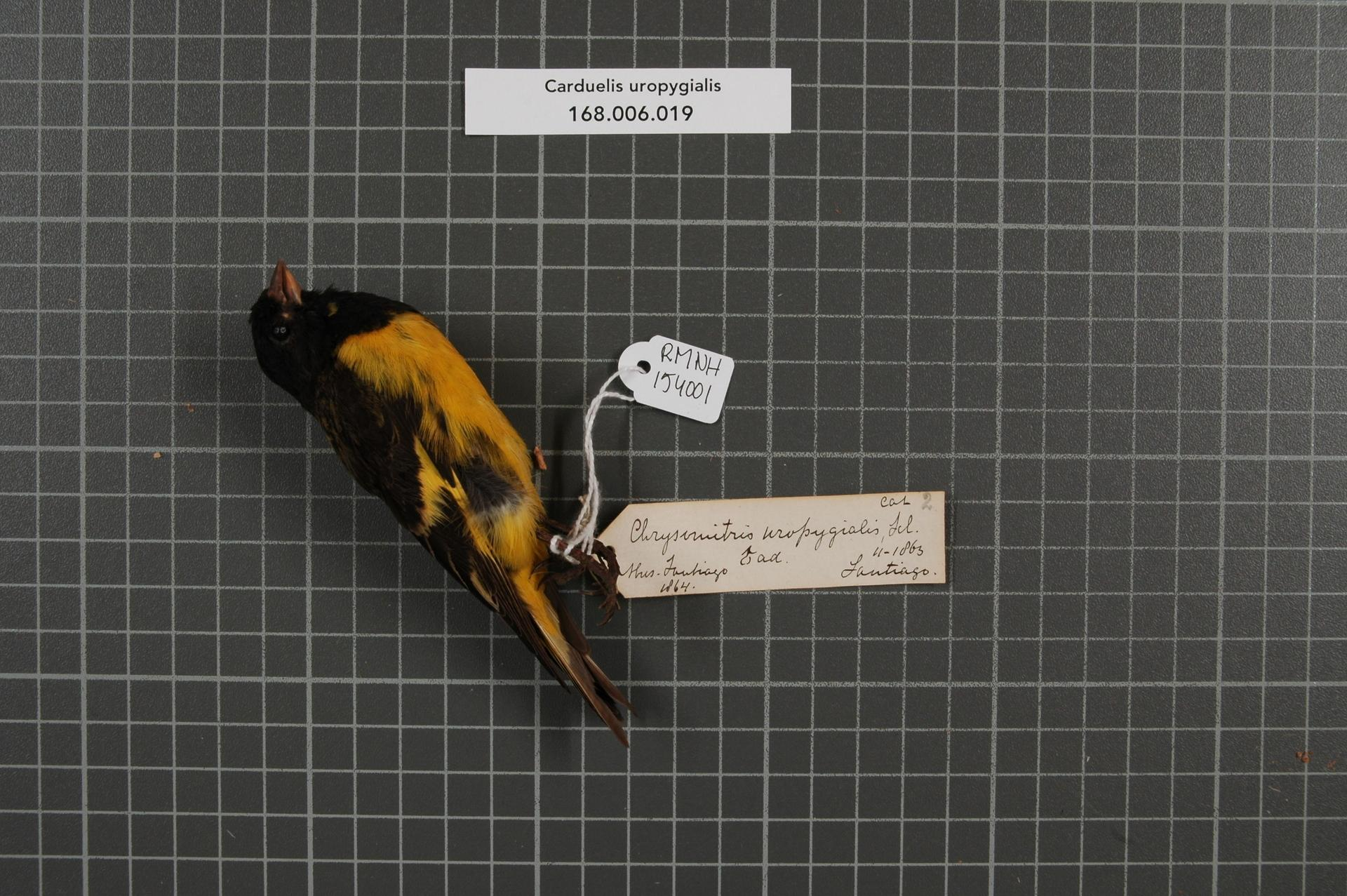
Specimen at the Naturalis Biodiversity Center

== Description ==
The yellow-rumped siskin is 12 to 14 cm (4.7 to 5.5 in) long; one individual weighed 14 g (0.49 oz). The species is sexually dimorphic but not dramatically so. Adult males have a sooty black head, neck, throat, and upper breast. Their back is sooty black, their rump bright yellow, and their uppertail coverts blackish with wide yellowish edges. Their tail is mostly black with wide yellow edges at the bases of the outer feathers. Their wings' greater coverts have wide yellow tips and the median coverts have small yellow tips. Their primaries have wide yellow bases, their secondaries have narrow yellow bases, and their tertials have thin pale yellowish or whitish edges. Their underparts from their lower breast are bright yellow with a greenish tinge on the flanks. Adult females are blackish brown where the male is sooty black. The feathers of their mantle, back, and scapulars have wide olive-green edges. Their tail and wings are like the male's. Their rump and underparts are a paler yellow than the male's. Juveniles are brownish to buffy gray on the head and upperparts with a golden-buff wash on the face. Their upperparts and breast have dark streaks. Both sexes have a black iris, a brown or dark brown bill, and dark brown or black legs and feet. The yellow-rumped siskin can be confused with the black siskin (Spinus atratus) where their ranges overlap.

== Distribution and habitat ==
The yellow-rumped siskin is found along the Andes from Peru's Department of Ancash south through western Bolivia to central Chile's Biobío Region and west-central Argentina's Mendoza Province. It inhabits a variety of somewhat open landscapes including scrublands, Polylepis woodlands, heathlands, lightly wooded plains, and rocky and brushy slopes and ravines. Overall it mostly ranges in elevation between 2,500 and 3,500 m (8,200 and 11,500 ft) but in the non-breeding season is found down to 500 m (1,600 ft) and more rarely to near sea level. In Peru it is found between 3,200 and 4,200 m (10,500 and 13,800 ft).

== Behavior ==
=== Movement ===
Sources differ about the yellow-rumped siskin's degree of migratory behavior. One source states it is a complete migrant, breeding in Argentina and the southern half of its Chilean range and moving north to northern Chile, Bolivia, and Peru in the non-breeding season. Another calls it a partial and altitudinal migrant. According to it, some remain in the breeding range year-round though at lower elevations while some vacate it to the north. A third states it is rare in Peru without noting any seasonality.

=== Feeding ===
The yellow-rumped siskin feeds primarily on seeds and occasionally includes small insects in its diet. It forages in pairs and small flocks during the breeding season and in larger flocks after it; the latter may include other species of siskin. It forages on the ground and in low vegetation.

=== Breeding ===
The yellow-rumped siskin's breeding season has not been defined but includes February at least to April. Nothing else is known about the species' breeding biology.

=== Vocalization ===
The yellow-rumped siskin's song is not well known, but is described as "a rich and melodious series of warbling phrases interspersed with twitters and trills" that is delivered more slowly than the songs of other siskins. Its call is "a nasal pheew".

== Status ==
The IUCN has assessed the yellow-rumped siskin as being of Least Concern. It has a large range; its population size is not known but is believed to be stable. No immediate threats have been identified. It is common to locally common in its breeding range and "generally uncommon, erratic or rare" in its non-breeding range.
