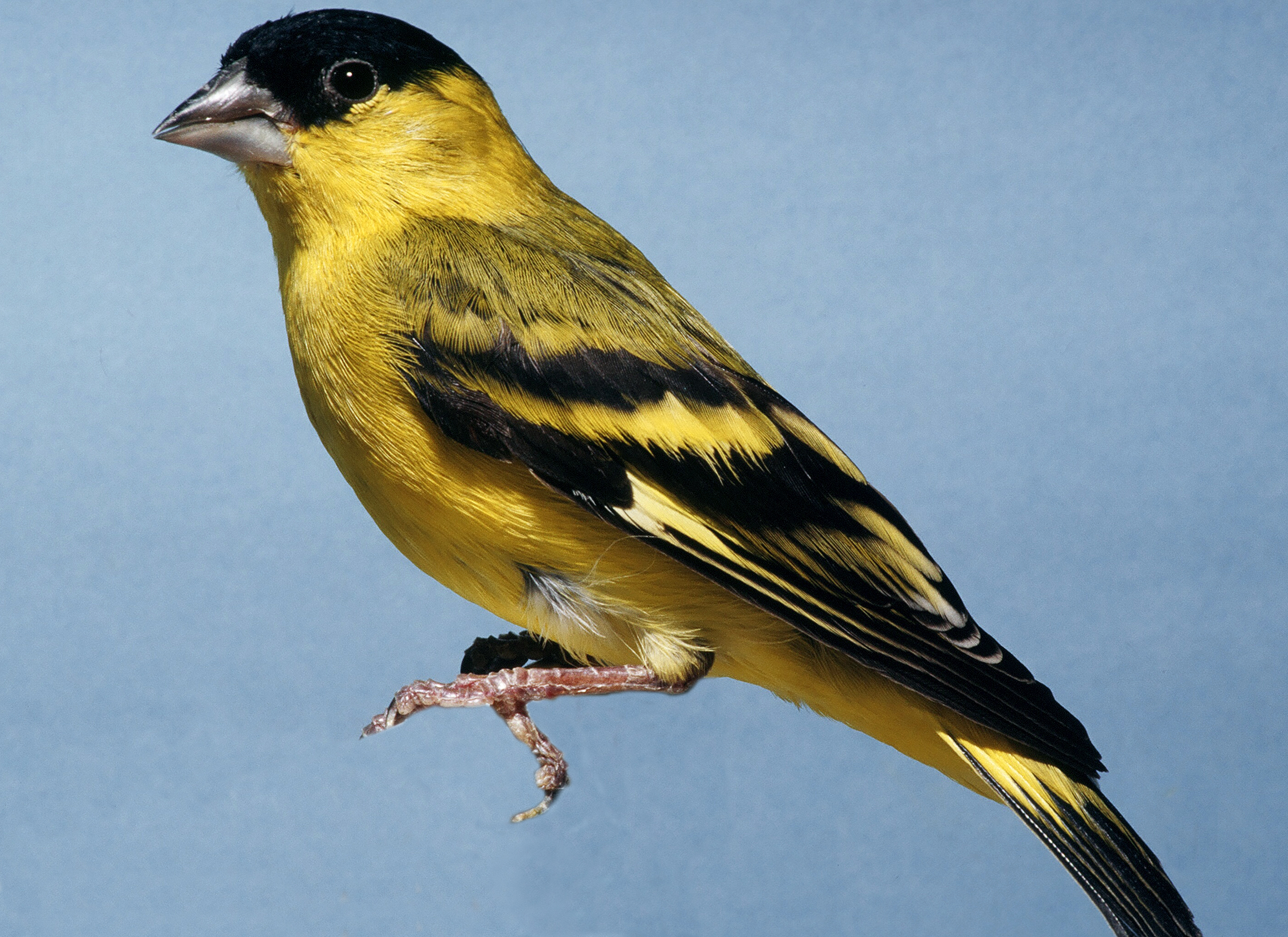

Conservation status
- Vulnerable (IUCN 3.1)
- CITES Appendix II

Scientific classification
- Kingdom: Animalia
- Phylum: Chordata
- Class: Aves
- Order: Passeriformes
- Family: Fringillidae
- Subfamily: Carduelinae
- Genus: Spinus
- Species: S. yarrellii

Binomial name
- Spinus yarrellii (Audubon, 1839)

Synonyms
- Sporagra yarrellii Carduelis yarrellii

= Yellow-faced siskin =

Species of bird

The yellow-faced siskin (Spinus yarrellii) is a species of finch in the family Fringillidae. It is found in Brazil and Venezuela. Its natural habitats are subtropical or tropical moist mountains, subtropical or tropical dry shrubland, arable land, plantations, and urban areas.

== Taxonomy ==
The yellow-faced siskin was formally described in 1839 by the Franco-American ornithologist John James Audubon under the binomial name Carduelis yarrellii. Audubon had illustrated the male and female birds in his The Birds of North America. He mistakenly specified the type locality as "Northern California" but this was re-designated in 1926 by the American ornithologist W. E. Clyde Todd as the Brazilian state of Bahia. Audubon chose the specific epithet to honour the English naturalist and bookseller William Yarrell. The yellow-faced siskin is now one of 20 finches placed in the genus Spinus that was introduced by Carl Ludwig Koch in 1816. A phylogenetic study published in 2015 found that the yellow-faced siskin was most closely related to the hooded siskin (Spinus magellanicus). No subspecies are recognised.

== Description ==
The yellow-faced siskin is sexually dimorphic with the male having a black crown. Both sexes have a bright yellow body with an olive back and black and yellow wings; the legs are pink and the tail is black on top and white underneath. Like other birds in its genus, it has a cone-shaped bill adapted to hold and shell seeds. The amount of black on the males head can vary with the lores and ear coverts also being black on some birds. Its call is a complex and melodious warble much like the calls of other relatives like the pine siskin and American goldfinch.

== Distribution ==
The yellow-faced siskin has a spotty distribution throughout Southeastern Brazil in the states of Ceará, Paraíba, Pernambuco, Piauí, and Bahia. There is also a disjunct population in northern Venezuela, though many authorities consider these to be escaped cage birds; However, specimens of this population were collected there in 1914.

== Behaviour and habitat ==
The yellow-faced siskins diet mainly consists of small seeds but also feeds on berries and insects. Its nest is cup shaped and mainly made out of grasses, spider webs, and hairs. Despite its small range, it occurs in a wide range of habitats including caatinga, urban areas, forest edges, second growth forests, and coffee plantations.

== Status ==
The yellow-faced siskin is currently ranked as vulnerable by the IUCN due to its heavy exploitation by the illegal bird trade which, along with deforestation pose serious risks to the bird. While the bird has always been semi-popular in the bird trade, increased trapping since the 1980s has seen a sharp decline in the birds population.
