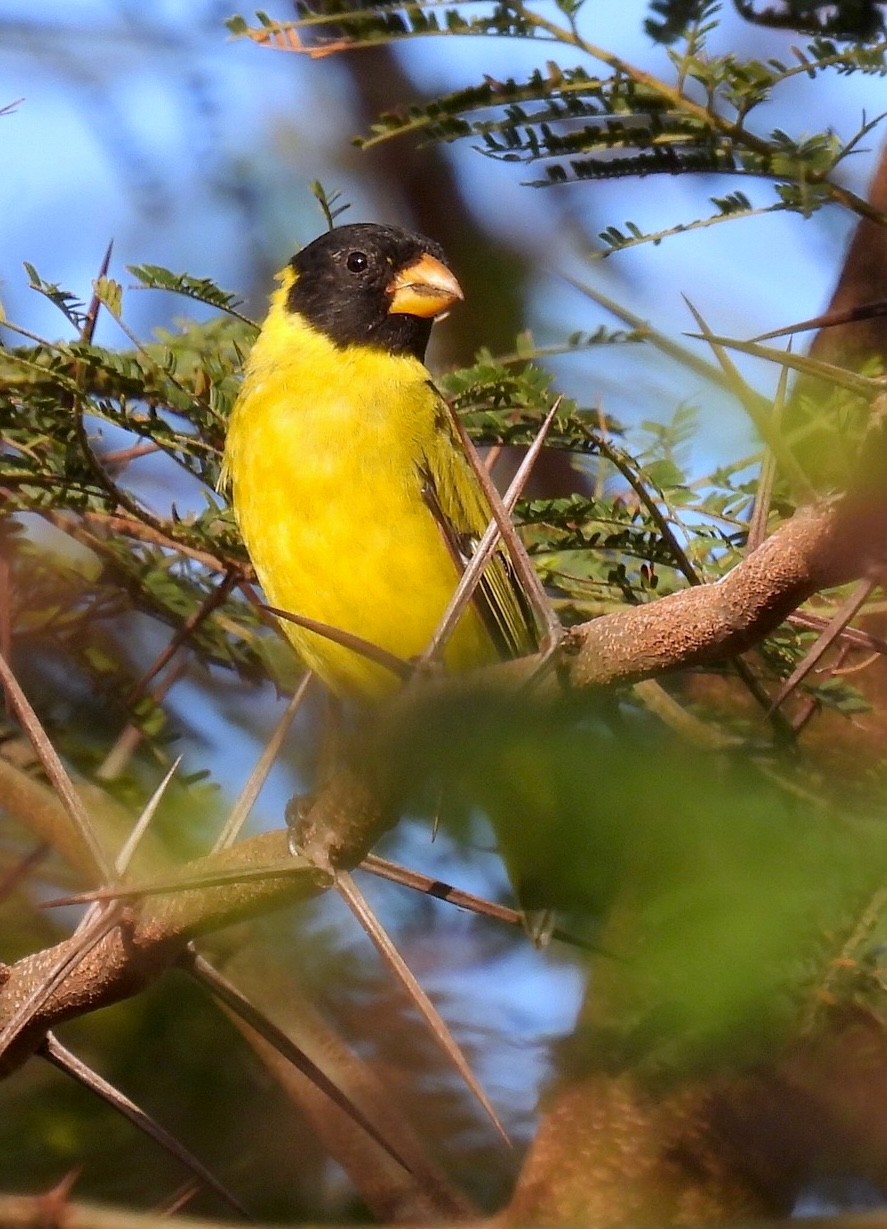
- Male in the Dominican Republic

Conservation status
- Least Concern (IUCN 3.1)

Scientific classification
- Kingdom: Animalia
- Phylum: Chordata
- Class: Aves
- Order: Passeriformes
- Family: Fringillidae
- Subfamily: Carduelinae
- Genus: Spinus
- Species: S. dominicensis

Binomial name
- Spinus dominicensis (Bryant, 1867)

Synonyms
- See text

= Antillean siskin =

Species of bird endemic to Hispaniola

The Antillean siskin (Spinus dominicensis) is a species of bird in the family Fringillidae, the finches and euphonias. It is endemic to the island of Hispaniola that is shared by Haiti and the Dominican Republic.

== Taxonomy and systematics ==
The Antillean siskin has a complicated taxonomic history. It was originally described by Henry Bryant in 1867 with the binomial Chrysomitris dominicensis. Bryant also proposed Loximitris as an alternate genus. It was later moved to what was then the subgenus Spinus within genus Carduelis. Beginning in about 2009 the subgenus was elevated to full genus level and the Antillean siskin, the rest of the New World siskins, and the goldfinches were therefore elevated to now-genus Spinus.

The Antillean siskin is the only member of genus Spinus found in the Caribbean. It is monotypic.

== Description ==
The Antillean siskin is 11 to 12 cm (4.3 to 4.7 in) long and weighs about 9 g (0.3 oz). The species is sexually dimorphic. Adult males have a black crown, face, and throat with a narrow bright yellow collar around their neck. Their lower nape, scapulars, and back are light olive-green and their rump and uppertail coverts a brighter olive-yellow. Their tail is mostly black with wide, deep yellow, edges at the bases of the outer feathers. Their wings have a complicated pattern. Their greater coverts are blackish brown with yellowish-olive edges and bright yellow tips. Their primary coverts are black. Their primaries and secondaries are black with thin olive-yellow edges and their tertials are black with thin yellow edges and yellow tips. Their underparts are bright yellow with an olive wash on the flanks and belly. Adult females have an olive-green crown, nape, and back with a brownish tinge on the mantle and scapulars. Their rump and uppertail coverts are yellow-green. Their tail is like the male's. Their wings are similar to the male's with paler or buffish tips on the greater coverts, thin light green or olive-yellow edges on the secondaries, and wider edges of that color on the tertials. Their face is pale olive or yellowish olive and their chin and throat buffish yellow with a gray tinge. Their breast is pale yellowish with thin dark brown streaks. Their belly and flanks are pale yellowish with wider dark brown streaks. Their lower belly and undertail coverts are white to off-white. Both sexes have a black iris, a whitish to pale straw-yellow bill, and brown to dark brown legs and feet. Juveniles are duller overall than adults. Their head and back are buffish olive-green with wide darker streaks. Their rump and uppertail coverts are pale olive-green. Their underparts are yellowish olive with wide dark brown streaks.

== Distribution and habitat ==
Despite its English name, the Antillean siskin is not widely distributed but is found on only one island in the chain, Hispaniola. In Haiti it is found in the far west in the Massif de la Hotte and in the southeast in the Massif de la Selle. The latter extends into the southwestern Dominican Republic as the Sierra de Bahoruco. It is also found north of there in the Dominican Republic in the Sierra de Neiba and further northeast in the Cordillera Central. It inhabits pine forest and the edges of moist broadleaf forest and also grassy clearings in them. In elevation it mostly ranges between 1,000 and 2,500 m (3,300 and 8,200 ft) but is found as low as 500 m (1,600 ft) in very cold weather.

== Behavior ==
=== Movement ===
The Antillean siskin is not a conventional migrant but roams nomadically to lower elevations in the non-breeding season.

=== Feeding ===
The Antillean siskin feeds mostly on seeds. It forages in small flocks or larger and looser ones, mostly on the ground or in low vegetation but also in taller shrubs and trees.

=== Breeding ===
The Antillean siskin's breeding season has not been fully defined but includes at least May and June. Its nest is a small cup made from moss and is usually sited low to the ground in a bush or pine tree. The clutch is two or three eggs that are pale greenish white with small brown spots. The incubation period, time to fledging, and details of parental care are not known.

=== Vocalization ===
The Antillean siskin's vocalizations include a "soft chutchut", a "higher-pitched swee-ee" and a "low, bubbling trill".

== Status ==
The IUCN has assessed the Antillean siskin as being of Least Concern. It has a restricted range; its population size is not known and is believed to be decreasing. No immediate threats have been identified. A field guide to birds of the Caribbean describes it as "common and widespread" in the Dominican Republic and "uncommon, but increasing" in Haiti's Massif de la Hotte.
