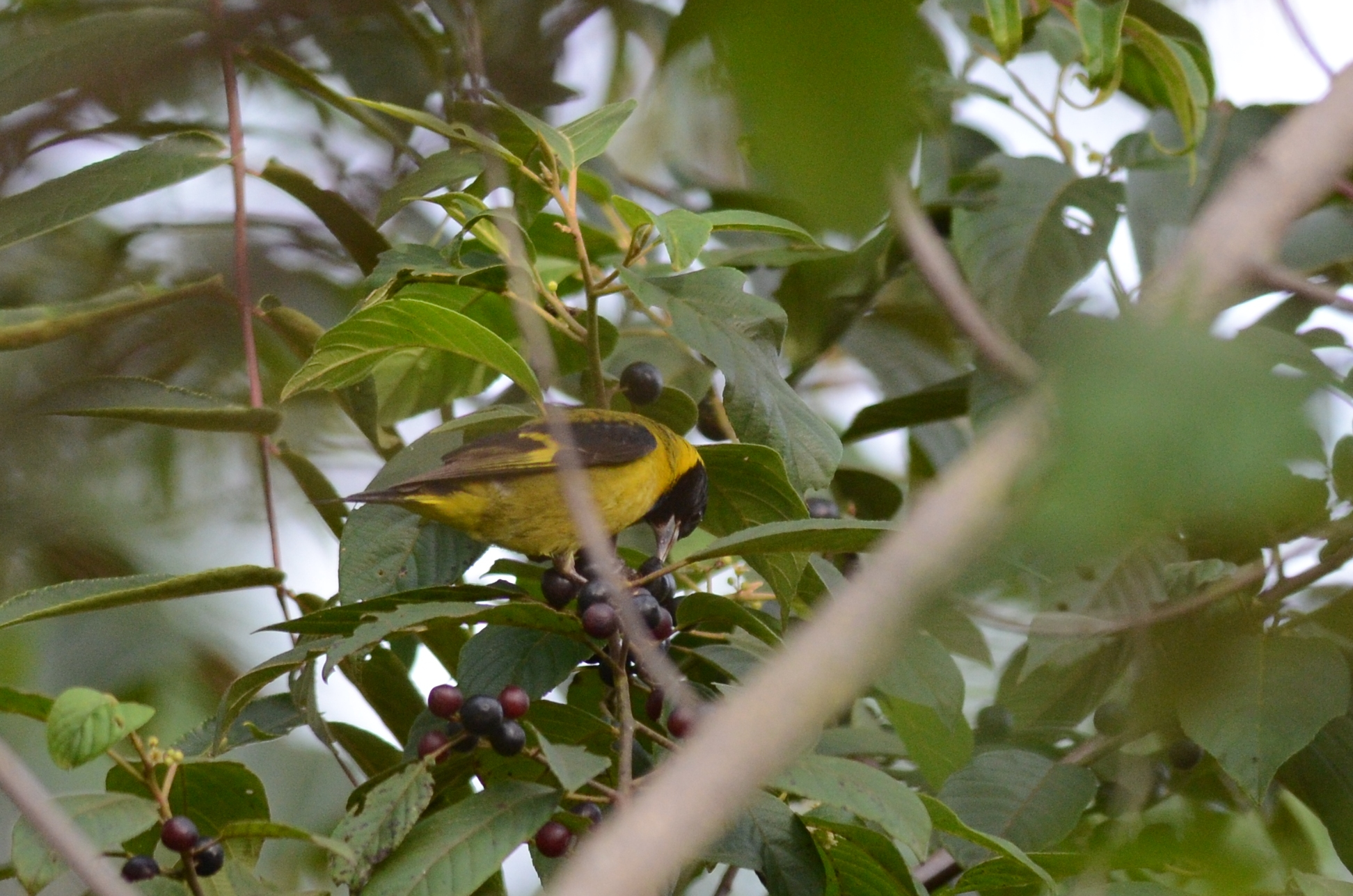

Conservation status
- Least Concern (IUCN 3.1)

Scientific classification
- Kingdom: Animalia
- Phylum: Chordata
- Class: Aves
- Order: Passeriformes
- Family: Fringillidae
- Subfamily: Carduelinae
- Genus: Spinus
- Species: S. notatus

Binomial name
- Spinus notatus (Du Bus de Gisignies, 1847)

Synonyms
- See text

= Black-headed siskin =

Species of bird

The black-headed siskin (Spinus notatus) is a species of bird in the family Fringillidae, the finches and euphonias. It is found in Mexico, Belize, El Salvador, Guatemala, Honduras, and Nicaragua.

== Taxonomy and systematics ==
The black-headed siskin was originally described in 1847 with the binomial Carduelis notata. It was later moved to what was then the subgenus Spinus within genus Carduelis. Beginning in about 2009 the subgenus was elevated to full genus level and the black-capped siskin, the rest of the New World siskins, and the goldfinches were therefore elevated to now-genus Spinus.

The black-headed siskin has these three subspecies:

- S. n. notatus (Du Bus de Gisignies, 1847)
- S. n. forreri (Salvin & Godman, 1886)
- S. n. oleaceus Griscom, 1932

== Description ==
The black-headed siskin is 10.2 to 11.5 cm (4.0 to 4.5 in) long and weighs about 10 to 14 g (0.35 to 0.49 oz). The species is sexually dimorphic. Adult males of the nominate subspecies S. n. notatus have a black head and upper breast. Their nape, back, and scapulars are yellowish olive-green with mostly hidden black spots in the middle of the feathers. Their rump and uppertail coverts are yellow. Their tail is mostly black with lemon yellow bases on the outermost pair of feathers. Their wings are mostly black with bright yellow bases on the flight feathers and bright yellow tips on the greater coverts; the latter form a wing bar. Their underparts from the lower breast are deep yellow. Adult females are similar to males but duller overall and less yellow on the tail and wings. Both sexes have a brown iris, a blue-gray bill, and gray legs and feet. Juveniles have an olive head and upperparts that is slightly paler on the rump. Their tail is blackish with a similar area of yellow to the adult. Their wings are blackish with buff instead of yellow wing bars. Their underparts are dirty pale yellow with a buff wash. Subspecies S. n. forreri is larger than the nominate. Its upperparts are less yellow (more olive) and the rump's and underparts' yellow is more greenish. S. n. oleaceus is slightly smaller than the nominate. Its upperparts are a much less yellow olive-green than the nominate's and its underparts are a dirty greenish yellow.

== Distribution and habitat ==
The black-headed siskin has a disjunct distribution. The nominate subspecies is found in eastern and central Mexico and Guatemala. Subspecies S. n. forreri is found in western Mexico from Sonora and Chihuahua south to Guerrero. S. n. oleaceus is found in Belize, Honduras, El Salvador, and Nicaragua. The species primarily inhabits semi-open pine-oak and oak forests and nearby more open areas such as younger secondary forest, weedy fields, and coffee plantations. Sources differ on its overall elevational range. One states it is 600 to 3,100 m (2,000 to 10,200 ft) and another 600 to 3,000 m (2,000 to 9,800 ft) and locally lower. Its maximum elevation outside Mexico is 2,750 m (9,000 ft).

== Behavior ==
=== Movement ===
The black-headed siskin is a year-round resident.

=== Feeding ===
The black-headed siskin feeds mostly on seeds. It forages in pairs and small flocks, and through all levels of trees.

=== Breeding ===
The black-headed siskin's clutch is two eggs. Nothing else is known about the species' breeding biology.

=== Vocalization ===
One description of the black-headed siskin's song is "a varied, rapid, jangling, twittering warble, often prolonged, with repetition of phrases and odd nasal and metallic notes thrown in". Another is a "rapid, liquid, tinkling, buzzy series of repeated elements lasting up to 15 sec.". Its calls include "a nasal teu...a drawn-out tseeeu, or djeein, a dry jeh-jeht, and a nasal ti-chie".

== Status ==
The IUCN has assessed the black-headed siskin as being of Least Concern. It has a very large range; its estimated population of at least 50,000 mature individuals is believed to be decreasing. No immediate threats have been identified. It is considered fairly common to common overall and fairly common outside Mexico. "Human activity probably has little short term effect on [the] Black-headed Siskin."
