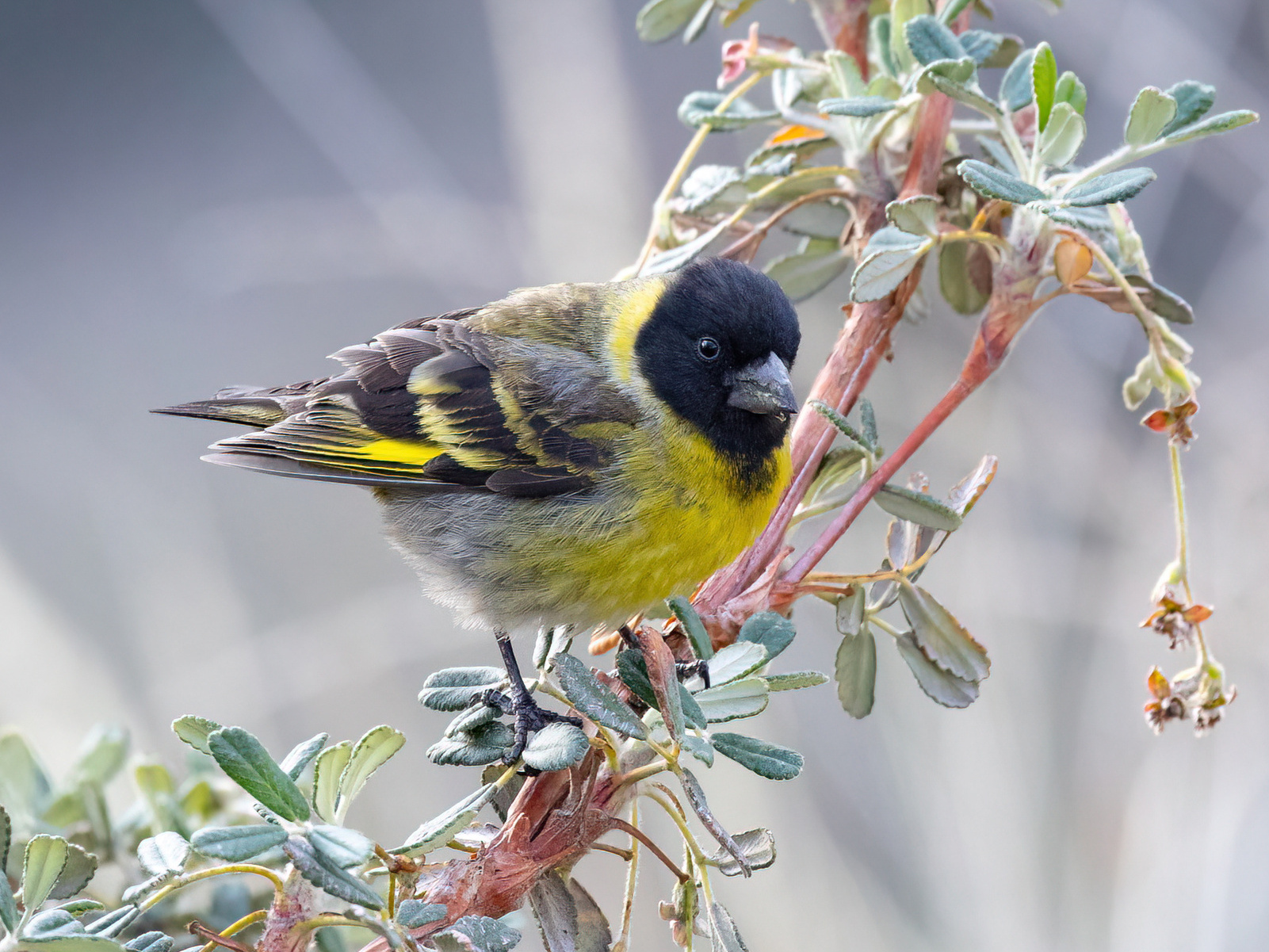
- Male
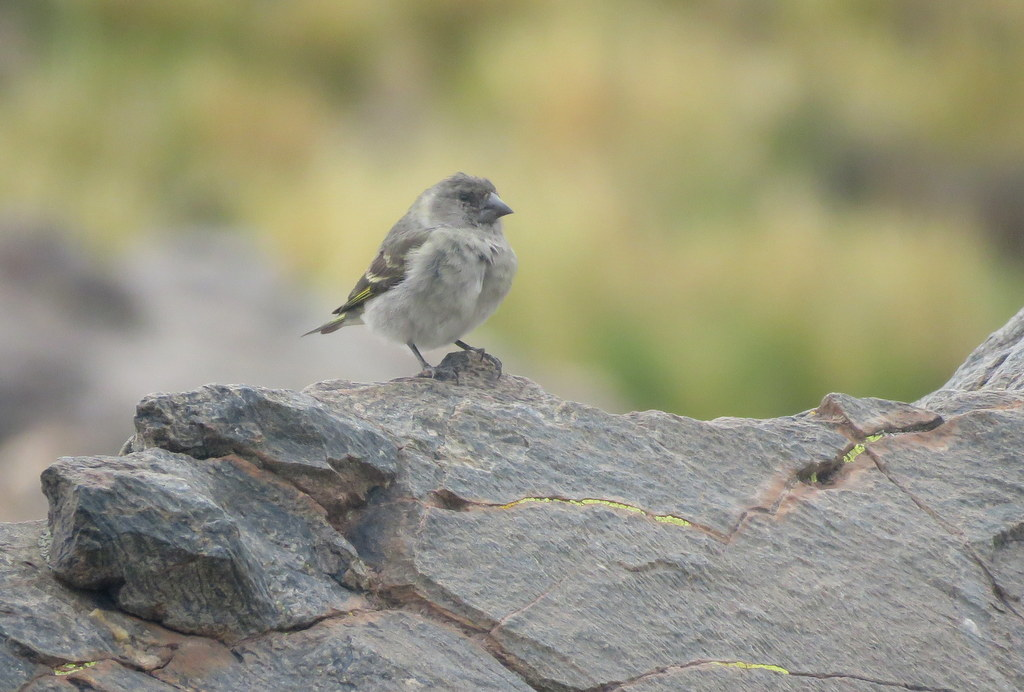
- Female

Conservation status
- Least Concern (IUCN 3.1)

Scientific classification
- Kingdom: Animalia
- Phylum: Chordata
- Class: Aves
- Order: Passeriformes
- Family: Fringillidae
- Subfamily: Carduelinae
- Genus: Spinus
- Species: S. crassirostris

Binomial name
- Spinus crassirostris (Landbeck, 1877)

Synonyms
- Sporagra crassirostris Carduelis crassirostris

= Thick-billed siskin =

Species of bird

The thick-billed siskin (Spinus crassirostris) is a species of bird in the family Fringillidae, the finches and euphonias. It is found in Argentina, Bolivia, Chile, and Peru.

== Taxonomy and systematics ==
The thick-billed siskin was originally described in 1877 with the binomial Chrysomitris crassirostris. It was later moved to what was then the subgenus Spinus within genus Carduelis and also spent time in genus Sporagra. Beginning in about 2009 the subgenus was elevated to full genus level and the yellow-rumped siskin, the rest of the New World siskins, and the New World goldfinches were therefore elevated to now-genus Spinus.

The thick-billed siskin has two subspecies, the nominate S. c. crassirostris (Landbeck, 1877) and S. c. amadoni (George, W. G., 1964). Some birds with colors intermediate between those of the two subspecies are postulated to be a third subspecies.

== Description ==
The thick-billed siskin is one of the larger members of genus Spinus and has the eponymous thick bill. It is 12.5 to 14 cm (4.9 to 5.5 in) long and weighs about 19 g (0.67 oz). The species is sexually dimorphic. Adult males of the nominate subspecies have a black head, neck, and throat with a thin yellow band around its lower edge. Their back and scapulars are olive-yellow with indistinct darker streaks. Their rump is greenish yellow and their uppertail coverts somewhat yellower. Their tail is mostly black with wide yellow edges at the bases of all feathers but the innermost. Their wings' median and greater coverts are blackish brown with yellow or yellowish green tips. Their primary coverts and flight feathers are mostly black. Their primaries and secondaries have wide yellow bases and the ends of the secondaries have light buff edges. Their tertials have thin pale or whitish buff edges and tips. Their breast and flanks are bright yellow, often with a greenish tinge on the flanks. Their belly to undertail coverts are bright yellow or yellowish buff. Adult females have a dark gray head and nape and a grayish olive chin and throat. Their upperparts are mostly green or greenish olive with buff flecks and an olive-yellow wash on the rump. Their tail and wings are much like the male's but with less yellow. Their breast is dingy yellow and their belly to undertail coverts off-white. Juveniles are mostly buffish brown with pale yellow undertail coverts.

Subspecies S. c. amadoni has a smaller bill than the nominate. Males have a duller black head and duller olive back. Their rump is olive and their uppertail coverts olive with grayish tips. Their tail has little or no yellow and their wings less yellow than the nominate. Their underparts are a much duller yellow than the nominate's with an olive tinge on the breast and whitish or pale yellow lower belly and vent. Females resemble the nominate but with their rump and uppertail coverts almost the same color as their back. Their underparts are grayish white with dusky streaks on the lower flanks and undertail coverts. Both sexes have a brown iris, a brown maxilla, a brownish horn mandible, and dark gray or blackish legs and feet.

== Distribution and habitat ==
The thick-billed siskin has a disjunct distribution. Subspecies S. c. amadoni is the more northerly of the two. It is found from Ancash Department in northwestern Peru south to extreme northern Chile and east into northwestern Bolivia. The possible third subspecies occurs in the northern half of that range. The nominate subspecies is found in southern Bolivia, northwestern Argentina, and central Chile. The species primarily inhabits Polylepis woodlands and shrublands and also brushy hillsides and areas with stunted trees. In elevation it ranges between 3,000 and 4,800 m (9,800 and 15,700 ft) overall and 3,600 and 4,600 m (11,800 and 15,100 ft) in Peru.

== Behavior ==
=== Movement ===
The thick-billed siskin's migratory behavior is not well known. It appears to be a partial migrant, with some individuals moving from higher elevations to lower ones and others from south to north after the breeding season. At all seasons but especially the non-breeding one it is somewhat nomadic.

=== Feeding ===
In the breeding season the thick-billed siskin feeds almost entirely on the seeds, buds, and shoots of Polylepis. It apparently has a more varied diet in the non-breeding season, which may be spent away from the Polylepis zone. It forages in pairs and small flocks during the breeding season and in larger flocks after it; the latter may include other species of siskin. It forages acrobatically in trees and often hangs upside down on thin branches.

=== Breeding ===
The thick-billed siskin's breeding season has not been defined but apparently includes November to March. Nothing else is known about the species' breeding biology.

=== Vocalization ===
The thick-billed siskin's song is "a series of twitters" similar to that of other siskins but delivered faster and at a lower pitch. Its calls include "a wheezy hew-li?, a mewing rhee?, and a low chatter".

== Status ==
The IUCN has assessed the thick-billed siskin as being of Least Concern. It has a large range; its population size is not known but is believed to be stable. No immediate threats have been identified. It is considered overall "locally common to rare" and infrequently recorded. It is considered rare to uncommon in Peru.
