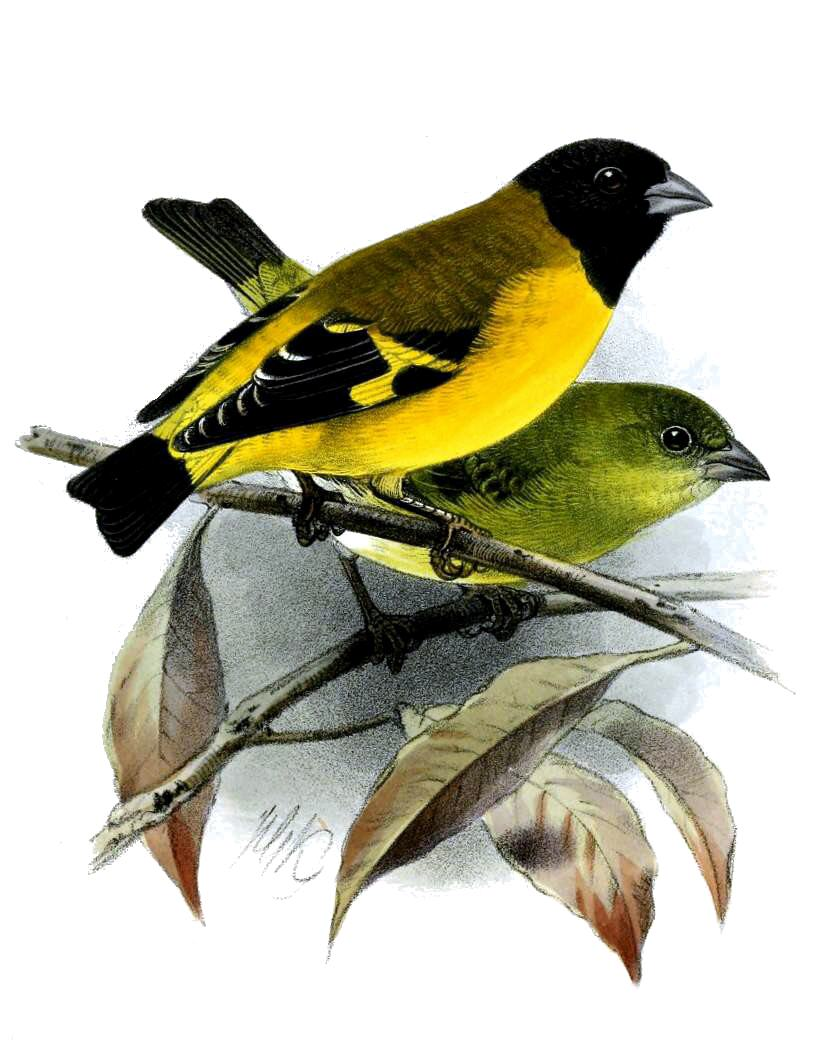

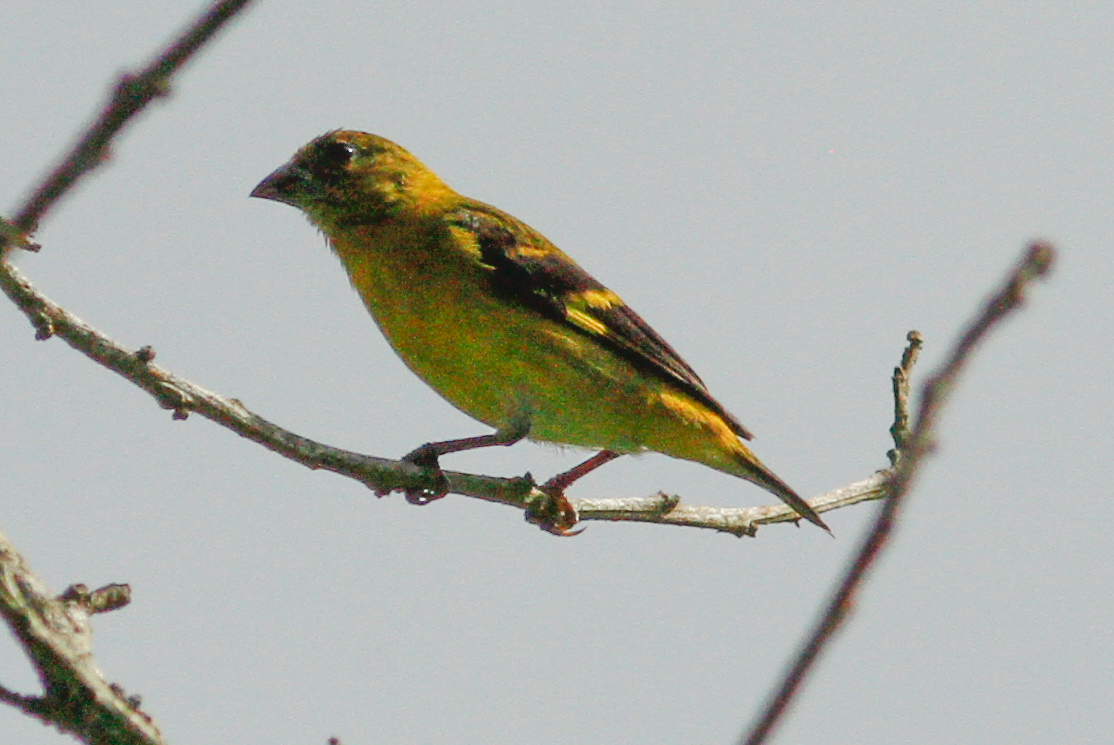

Conservation status
- Least Concern (IUCN 3.1)

Scientific classification
- Kingdom: Animalia
- Phylum: Chordata
- Class: Aves
- Order: Passeriformes
- Family: Fringillidae
- Subfamily: Carduelinae
- Genus: Spinus
- Species: S. siemiradzkii

Binomial name
- Spinus siemiradzkii (Berlepsch & Taczanowski, 1884)

Synonyms
- Sporagra siemiradzkii Carduelis siemiradzkii

= Saffron siskin =

Species of bird

The saffron siskin (Spinus siemiradzkii) is a species of finch in the family Fringillidae. It is found in Ecuador and Peru. Its natural habitats are subtropical or tropical dry forests, subtropical or tropical dry shrubland, and urban areas. It is threatened by habitat destruction and the IUCN has assessed it as being a "least concern species".

== Description ==
The saffron siskin grows to a length of about 10 to 10.5 cm (3.9 to 4.1 in). Like other siskins, the colours of this bird are black, olive and yellow, with black wings and a prominent yellow band on the bases of the flight feathers and another on the wing coverts. The male differs from the male hooded siskin (Spinus magellanicus) in having an unstreaked, golden-olive back and bright yellow underparts. The female differs from the female hooded siskin by being altogether yellower, with yellow underparts rather than grey.

== Distribution and habitat ==
The saffron siskin is endemic to southwestern Ecuador and northwestern Peru. It is an uncommon bird found near the edges of dry woodland and in adjoining scrubland at altitudes below 600 m (2,000 ft).

== Ecology ==
The behaviour of the saffron siskin is similar to that of the hooded siskin, but it usually occurs at lower elevations. It feeds mainly on plant material, such as seeds, leaves and buds, but also on insects, foraging among tall grasses and plants and on the ground. It breeds between January and May but little is known of its nesting habits.

== Status ==
This bird is generally uncommon and rarely seen. The total population is estimated to be under 10,000 individuals and is probably in decline because of the conversion of forest for agricultural uses. Despite the bird occurring in the Machalilla National Park and five other protected areas in Ecuador, the International Union for Conservation of Nature assesses it as being a "least concern species". The high rate of deforestation in the country adds to the likeliness of the threat that it faces.
