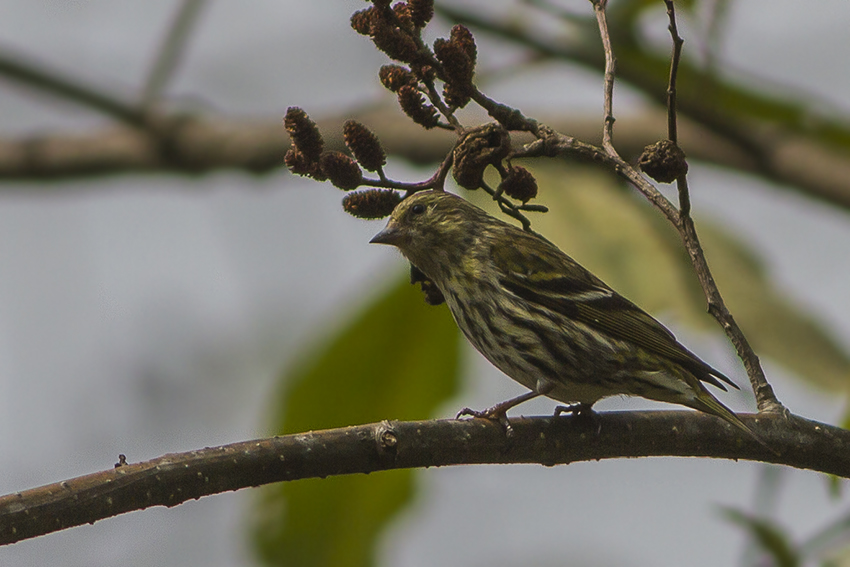
- Female Tibetan serin from Varsey Rhododendron Sanctuary, Sikkim, India

Conservation status
- Least Concern (IUCN 3.1)

Scientific classification
- Kingdom: Animalia
- Phylum: Chordata
- Class: Aves
- Order: Passeriformes
- Family: Fringillidae
- Subfamily: Carduelinae
- Genus: Spinus
- Species: S. thibetanus

Binomial name
- Spinus thibetanus (Hume, 1872)

= Tibetan serin =

Species of bird

The Tibetan serin (Spinus thibetanus) or Tibetan siskin is a true finch species (family Fringillidae).

== Taxonomy and systematics ==
The Tibetan serin was formerly placed in the genus Serinus but was assigned to the genus Spinus based on a phylogenetic analysis of mitochondrial and nuclear DNA sequences.

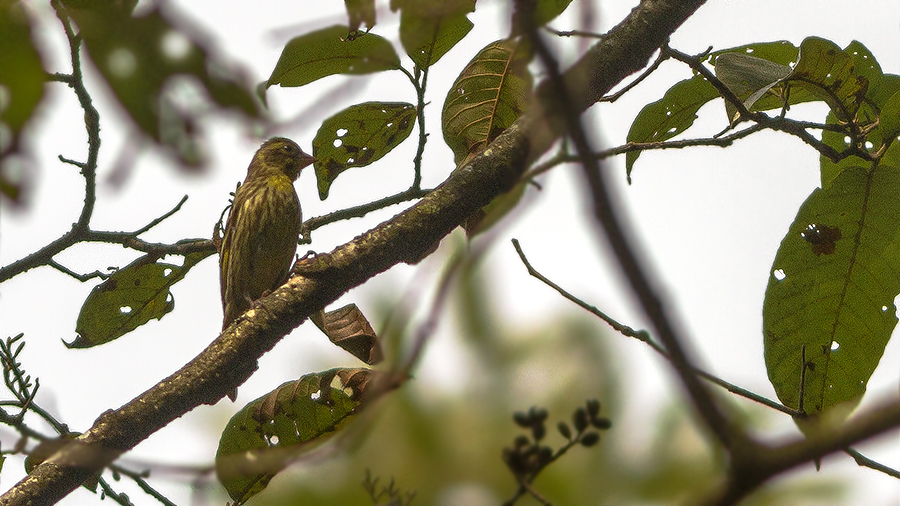
Female (♀) from Khangchendzonga Biosphere Reserve, West Sikkim, India

The first description of the species was by the British ornithologist Allan Octavian Hume in 1872 under the binomial name Chrysomitris thibetanus. In the 19th century, it was also referred to as the Sikkim siskin. At that time, the Lepcha of Sikkim referred to it as tŭk nyil nyón ('fierce wormwood').

== Description ==
Length (including the tail) of this species is around 12 cm (4.7 in). The Tibetan siskin lacks yellow panels on its wings in all plumages. Adult males have olive-greenish upper parts, yellow underparts, yellowish-green rumps, yellow supercilium and border behind ear-coverts. Wing and tail feathers of this bird species are broadly differentiated by a yellowish-green color. Adult females of this species have black streaking on darker greyish-green upper parts, more clearly defined wing-bars than their male counterparts, paler yellowish throats and black-flanked breasts with streaking. Juveniles are duller green, tinged brownish-buff on upper parts, with duller rumps, buff fringes to greater coverts and paler or heavily streaked underparts.

== Distribution ==
This species is found in Bhutan, China, India, Myanmar, and Nepal. Its natural habitat is temperate forests. It spends the winter in the central and eastern Himalayas. A group of birders from West Bengal discovered its presence in Hee Village near Varsey Rhododendron Sanctuary, Sikkim, India in the month of March 2013.

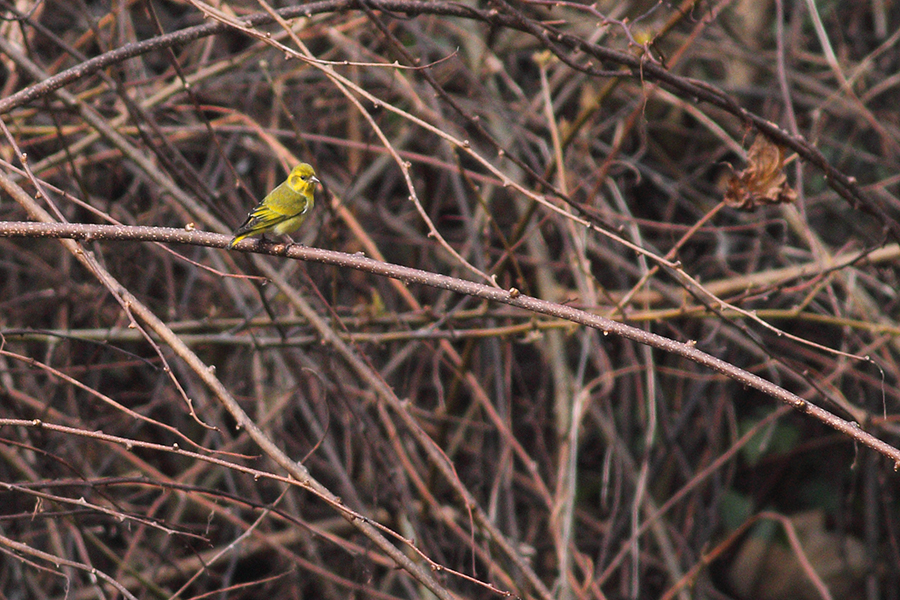
From Eaglenest Wildlife Sanctuary, Arunachal Pradesh, India

== Habitat ==
Tibetan serins generally breed in mixed forest and spend their winter in alder.

== Voice ==
Their soft chattering sound is much like twang twang.
