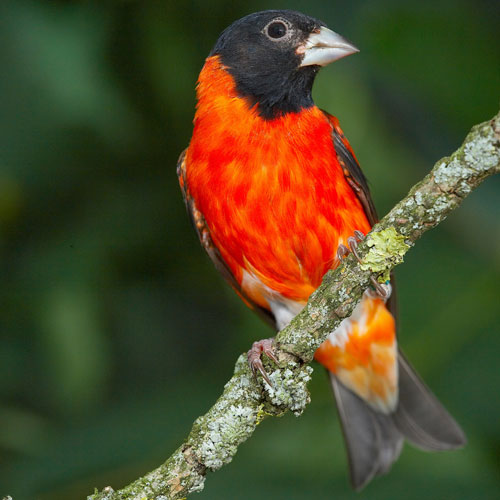
- Male

Conservation status
- Endangered (IUCN 3.1)
- CITES Appendix I

Scientific classification
- Kingdom: Animalia
- Phylum: Chordata
- Class: Aves
- Order: Passeriformes
- Family: Fringillidae
- Subfamily: Carduelinae
- Genus: Spinus
- Species: S. cucullatus

Binomial name
- Spinus cucullatus (Swainson, 1820)

Synonyms
- Carduelis cucullata Swainson, 1820; Sporagra cucullata (Swainson, 1820)

= Red siskin =

Species of bird

The red siskin (Spinus cucullatus) is a small endangered finch.

== Distribution ==
It is native to tropical South America - in northern Colombia, northern Venezuela (where it is called the "cardenalito") and Guyana. It was common in the early 20th century, occurring throughout the foothills of northern Venezuela, but has now become extremely rare in a fragmented range. The population on Trinidad is believed to be extirpated, with no sightings since 1960. An introduced population derived from escaped cagebirds in Puerto Rico has since thought to become extinct.

== Description ==
The red siskin is about 10 cm long. The male is mainly deep red, with black on the head, throat, flight feathers and tail tip, and a whitish lower belly and under tail. The female is grey on the head, breast, and upper parts, apart from a red rump and upper tail. The breast is grey with reddish flanks, and the rest of the underparts, the wings and tail resemble the corresponding areas of the male. Immature females are paler than the adults, and immature males are brown rather than red.

== Call ==
The call is a high-pitched chitter and sharp chi-tit like the Indian silverbill, and the male's song is a musical goldfinch-like melody with twitters and trills.

== Behaviour and ecology ==
The red siskin is found in open country, forest edges and grassland with trees or shrubs. The female is believed to lay three greenish-white eggs in a grassy cup nest in a tree. Red siskins eat seeds and are highly gregarious. When they were more numerous, they formed semi-nomadic flocks.

== Conservation ==
This siskin has been illegally trapped for the cage bird trade and endangered by environmental factors. Domestication has probably been responsible for the continuation of the species, which might otherwise be extinct. This is an attractive finch with a pleasant song, and its unique coloration for a small finch has led to it being used for interbreeding with domestic canaries to produce varieties with red in the plumage.

=== Conservation status ===
The red siskin is listed as endangered by the IUCN Red List and nationally critically endangered in Venezuela. It is listed on CITES Appendix I. The greatest threat to the species has been intense illegal trapping for the bird trade since the 1940s; however, the species also faces extensive habitat loss. Some hope has been given to this highly endangered species by the discovery in 2003 of a population of several thousand birds in southern Guyana, 1000 km from any previously known colony. Otherwise, the world population is believed to be between 600–6,000 pairs.

Researchers at the Smithsonian Conservation Biology Institute lead a program, the Red Siskin Initiative, with the goals of uncovering more about this species and preventing its extinction. The National Aviary in Pittsburgh, PA has a captive breeding program for the species.
