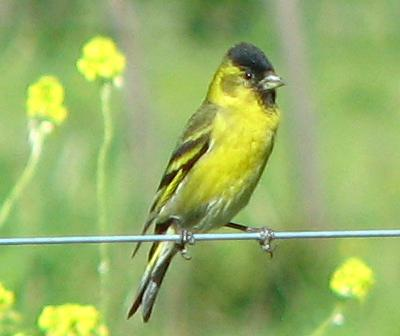
- Male black-chinned siskin

Conservation status
- Least Concern (IUCN 3.1)

Scientific classification
- Kingdom: Animalia
- Phylum: Chordata
- Class: Aves
- Order: Passeriformes
- Family: Fringillidae
- Subfamily: Carduelinae
- Genus: Spinus
- Species: S. barbatus

Binomial name
- Spinus barbatus (Molina, 1782)

Synonyms
- See text

= Black-chinned siskin =

Species of bird

The black-chinned siskin (Spinus barbatus) is a species of bird in the family Fringillidae, the finches and euphonias. It is found in Argentina, Chile and the Falkland Islands.

== Taxonomy and systematics ==
The black-chinned siskin has a complicated taxonomic history. It was originally described in 1782 with the binomial Fringilla barbata. It was renamed Chrysomitris barbata in 1860. It was tentatively placed in genus Spinus in 1889 and was first proposed with its current binomial in 1909. Between those dates several other putative species were described with different genera but all were eventually determined to be examples what is now Spinus barbatus. Sometime after 1926 genus Spinus was relegated to subgenus status within genus Carduelis. Beginning in about 2009 the subgenus was restored to full genus level and the black-chinned siskin, the rest of the New World siskins, and the New World goldfinches were therefore returned to genus Spinus.

The black-chinned siskin is monotypic.

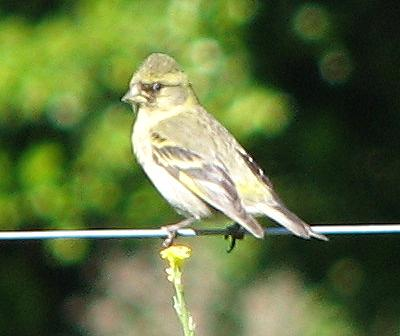
Female black-chinned siskin

== Description ==
The black-chinned siskin is 12 to 13 cm (4.7 to 5.1 in) long and weighs about 13 to 20 g (0.46 to 0.71 oz). The species is sexually dimorphic. Adult males have black lores, forehead, and crown. Their face is olive or green with a yellowish wash and a bright yellowish supercilium from behind the eye to the side of the neck. Their nape and back are olive green with thin dark streaks and their rump and uppertail coverts are yellow to yellowish green. Their tail is mostly black with yellow bases on all but the innermost pair of feathers. Their wings have a complicated pattern. The median coverts are black with pale olive green edges and dull yellow tips. The greater coverts are the same but for bright yellow tips. The covert tips appear as a wing bar. The flight feathers are mostly black with bright yellow bases on the primaries and pale greenish yellow or pale buff edges on the tertials. Their chin and the center of their throat are black. Their breast is bright yellow with a green wash on the flanks, their belly whitish, and their undertail coverts pale yellow with black tips. Adult females have no black on the head; it is mostly greenish yellow or olive-yellow with a bright yellow forehead and a wide yellow supercilium. Their back is a duller olive green than the male's with darker green streaks. Their wing coverts and tail have less yellow than the male's. Their underparts are often similar to males' but may be pale yellowish gray. Both sexes have a black iris, a dark brown or blackish bill with a pinkish brown base to the mandible, and brown or pale pinkish brown legs and feet. Juveniles are similar to adult females. However, they are paler overall with darker green streaks on their upperparts and a pale greenish yellow rump. They have no bright yellow on the face. The tips of their wing coverts are pale buff or buffish yellow. Their underparts are mostly pale yellow with a gray or olive tinge on the breast and flanks.

== Distribution and habitat ==
The black-chinned siskin is the most southerly of its genus. It is found in Chile from the Atacama Region south to the southernmost Magallanes Region, in Argentina from southern Mendoza and La Pampa provinces to Tierra del Fuego, and on the Falkland Islands. On the mainland it primarily inhabits tall coniferous and broadleaf forest and is also found in more open country with brush, thickets, and Nothofagus shrubs. In some areas it occurs in suburban gardens. On the Falklands it favors areas with tall tussock grass and introduced trees and shrubs. In elevation it mostly occurs below 1,500 m (4,900 ft) but there are records as high as 1,850 m (6,100 ft).

== Behavior ==
=== Movement ===
The black-chinned siskin is a partial migrant. Many move from higher elevations to the plains and valleys after the breeding season. It also seems that many individuals who breed on Chile's Chiloé Island move to the mainland after breeding.

=== Feeding ===
The black-chinned siskin feeds primarily on seeds. It has also been observed feeding on insect larvae extracted from under tree bark, on flowers in a plum (Prunus domestica) farm, and on farmed flax (Linum) wheat (Triticum). It forages in pairs and small flocks during the breeding season and outside it in flocks as large as 100 individuals. It feeds at all levels of its habitat, from weedy patches to the forest canopy.

=== Breeding ===
The black-chinned siskin breeds from July to February; on the Falklands three broods have been noted in a season. Its nest is a cup made from grasses, other plant fibers, and animal hair. It is typically placed in a shrub's branch fork up to about 2 m (7 ft) above the ground. The clutch is three to five eggs that are pinkish white with reddish brown markings. The incubation period, time to fledging, and details of parental care are not known.

=== Vocalization ===
The black-chinned siskin's song is "a loud series of musical phrases and trills" and sometimes includes call notes. Its calls include a "rising tsooeet", an "abrupt chit or chit-tip", a "more subdued tsi-tsi-tsi, together with a more prolonged twittering note", and "a short chup in flight".

== Status ==
The IUCN has assessed the black-chinned siskin as being of Least Concern. It has a large range; its population size is not known but is believed to be stable. No immediate threats have been identified. It is considered "[w]idespread and common throughout most of its range".
