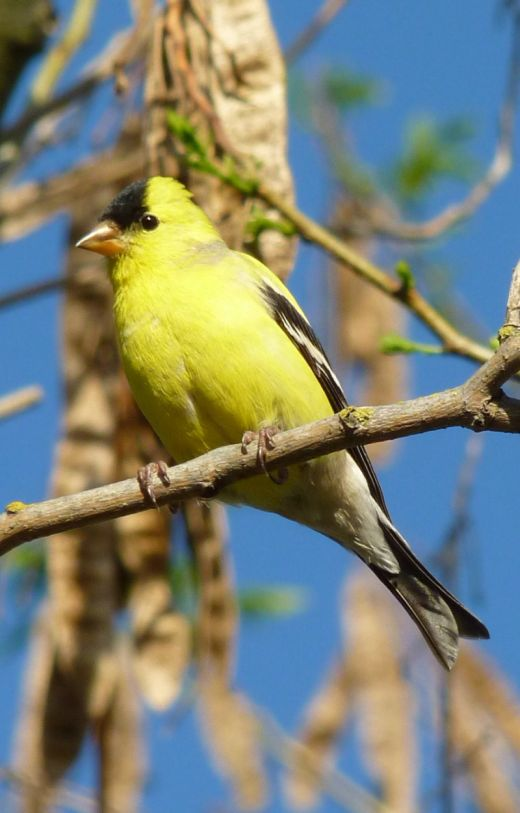
- American goldfinch (Spinus tristis)

Scientific classification
- Kingdom: Animalia
- Phylum: Chordata
- Class: Aves
- Order: Passeriformes
- Family: Fringillidae
- Subfamily: Carduelinae
- Genus: Spinus; Koch, 1816

Type species
- Fringilla spinus Linnaeus, 1758

Species
- See text

= Spinus (bird) =

Genus of birds

Spinus is a genus of passerine birds in the finch family Fringillidae encompassing the Siskins and New world goldfinches.

== Taxonomy ==
The genus Spinus was introduced in 1816 by the German naturalist Carl Ludwig Koch with the type species by tautonomy as Fringilla spinus Linnaeus, 1758, the Eurasian siskin. The genus name is from the Ancient Greek σπίνος spínos, a name for a now-unidentifiable bird.

All of the species in the genus, except for the Tibetan serin, were formerly included in the genus Carduelis. They were moved to the resurrected genus Spinus based on phylogenetic studies of mitochondrial and nuclear DNA sequences. The Tibetan serin was formerly placed in the genus Serinus. The Eurasian siskin and the Tibetan serin are the only species from the Old World included in the group.

The Tibetan serin is an outgroup within Spinus, having been the first to diverge. The remainder of the genus can be divided into three monophyletic clades: the North American goldfinches (Lawrence's, lesser, and American); the so-called North American siskins (Eurasian, pine, Antillean, and black-capped); and the South American siskins (the remaining 12 species).

The radiation of South American siskins was rapid, and was originally thought to have occurred around 3.5 million years ago due to a range expansion associated with the Great American Interchange and contingent upon the spread of mesothermal plants from the Rocky Mountains to the Andes. More recent work suggests the radiation occurred much later, within the last 1 million years, and speciation events may have been initiated by the climactic variations of the late Pleistocene.

The hooded siskin may be paraphyletic.

== Ecology ==
Spinus finches are gregarious and may breed and forage in small groups. In the non-breeding season, these species generally disperse away from the breeding grounds and small flocks roam nomadically in search of food; these flocks may be of one species or mixed with other species in the genus. Some species, such as the pine siskin and thick-billed siskin, are considered irruptive.

Like most other members of Carduelinae, but unusually amongst songbirds, members of Spinus are primarily granivorous, but may occasionally supplement their diet with insects or fruit. Most species eat a variety of small seeds, especially from asters, grasses, alders, and birches.

== Conservation ==
The IUCN lists 17 species as least concern, two as vulnerable (saffron siskin and yellow-faced siskin), and one, the red siskin, as endangered. Species in this clade are threatened by habitat loss and capture for the cage-bird trade.

== Species ==
The genus contains the following 20 species:

Image	Common name	Scientific name	Distribution
	Tibetan serin	Spinus thibetanus	Bhutan, China, India, Myanmar, and Nepal
	American goldfinch	Spinus tristis	mid-Alberta to North Carolina during the breeding season, and from just south of the Canada–United States border to Mexico during the winter
	Lawrence's goldfinch	Spinus lawrencei	California and Baja California, winters in the southwestern United States and northern Mexico
	Lesser goldfinch	Spinus psaltria	the southwestern United States (near the coast, as far north as extreme southwestern Washington) to Venezuela and Peru
	Eurasian siskin	Spinus spinus	Eurasia and North Africa
	Antillean siskin	Spinus dominicensis	Hispaniola (Haiti and the Dominican Republic)
	Pine siskin	Spinus pinus	Canada, Alaska and, to a more variable degree, across the western mountains and northeastern parts of the United States
	Black-capped siskin	Spinus atriceps	Mexico and Guatemala
	Black-headed siskin	Spinus notatus	Mexico, Belize, El Salvador, Guatemala, Honduras, and Nicaragua
	Black-chinned siskin	Spinus barbatus	Chile, Argentina and the Falkland Islands
	Yellow-bellied siskin	Spinus xanthogastrus	Costa Rica south to southern Ecuador, central Bolivia and the highlands of northwestern Venezuela
	Olivaceous siskin	Spinus olivaceus	northern Peru to La Paz and Cochabamba in Bolivia and to southeastern Ecuador; has also been observed east of the Andes near Santa Cruz de la Sierra in Bolivia
	Hooded siskin	Spinus magellanicus	central Argentina north to central Brazil
	Saffron siskin	Spinus siemiradzkii	Ecuador and Peru
	Yellow-faced siskin	Spinus yarrellii	Brazil and Venezuela
	Red siskin	Spinus cucullatus	northern Colombia and northern Venezuela
	Black siskin	Spinus atratus	Chile, Argentina, Bolivia and Peru
	Yellow-rumped siskin	Spinus uropygialis	Chile, Argentina, Bolivia and Peru
	Thick-billed siskin	Spinus crassirostris	Chile, Argentina, Bolivia and Peru
	Andean siskin	Spinus spinescens	Colombia, Ecuador and Venezuela
