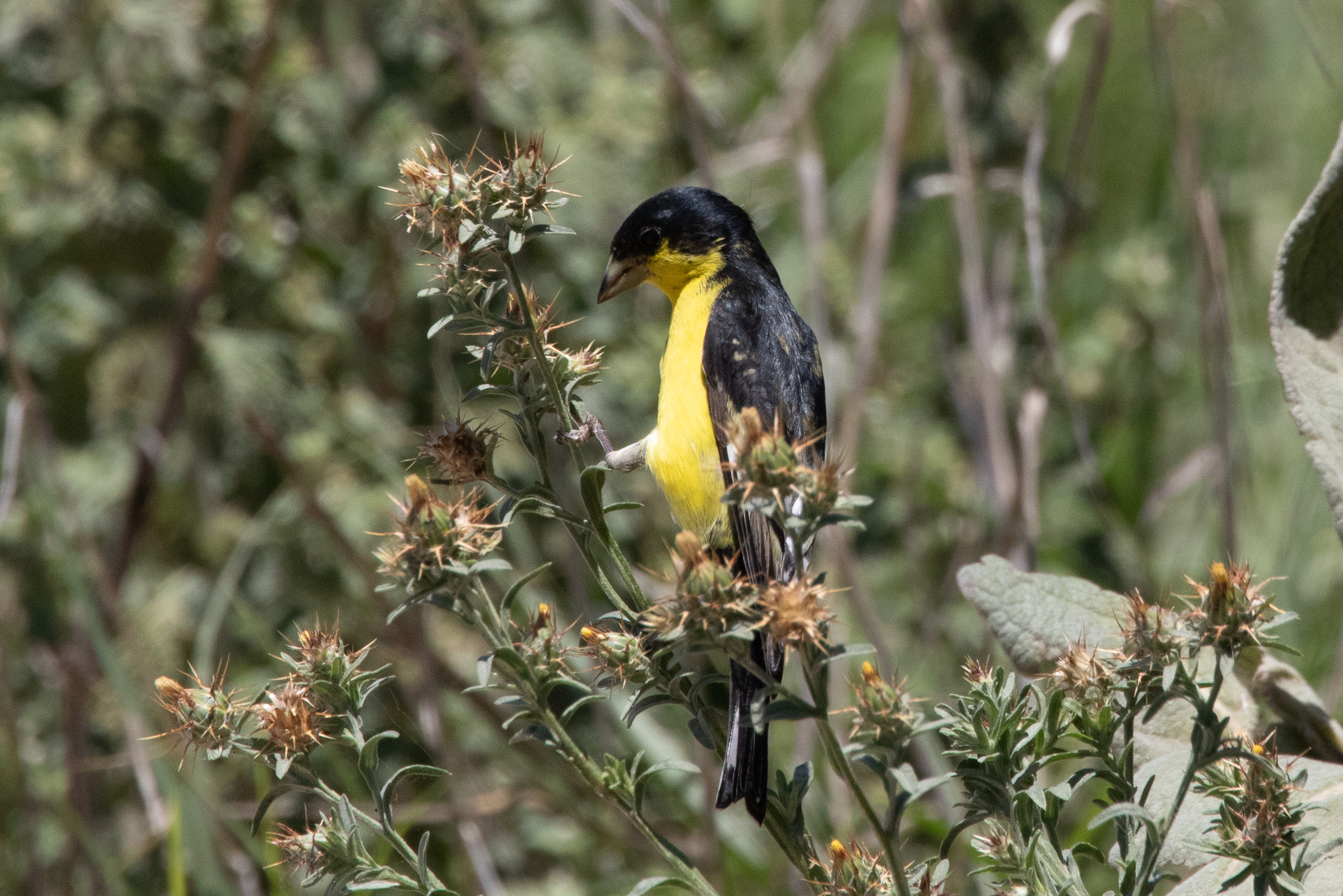
- Male
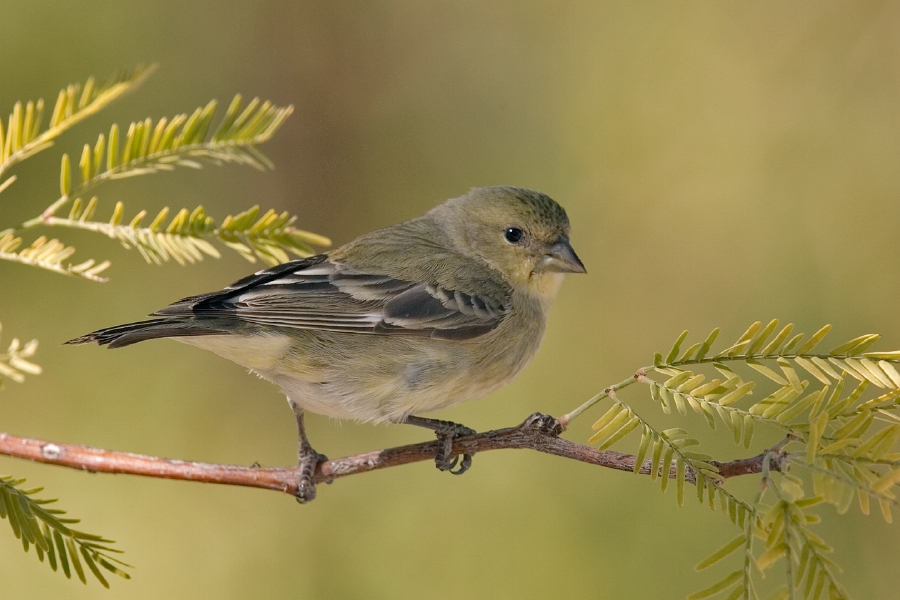
- Female

Conservation status
- Least Concern (IUCN 3.1)

Scientific classification
- Kingdom: Animalia
- Phylum: Chordata
- Class: Aves
- Order: Passeriformes
- Family: Fringillidae
- Subfamily: Carduelinae
- Genus: Spinus
- Species: S. psaltria

Binomial name
- Spinus psaltria (Say, 1822)

Subspecies
- see text

Synonyms
- Fringilla psaltria (protonym); Carduelis psaltria Astragalinus psaltria

= Lesser goldfinch =

Species of bird

The lesser goldfinch (Spinus psaltria) is a small finch in the genus Spinus native to the Americas.

As is the case for most species in the genus Spinus, lesser goldfinch males have a black forehead, which females lack. Males in this species vary strikingly in the color of their back across their range, from green in western North America to black in the eastern Rocky Mountains and Texas south to northern South America; this variation has resulted in five subspecies being recognized.

== Taxonomy ==
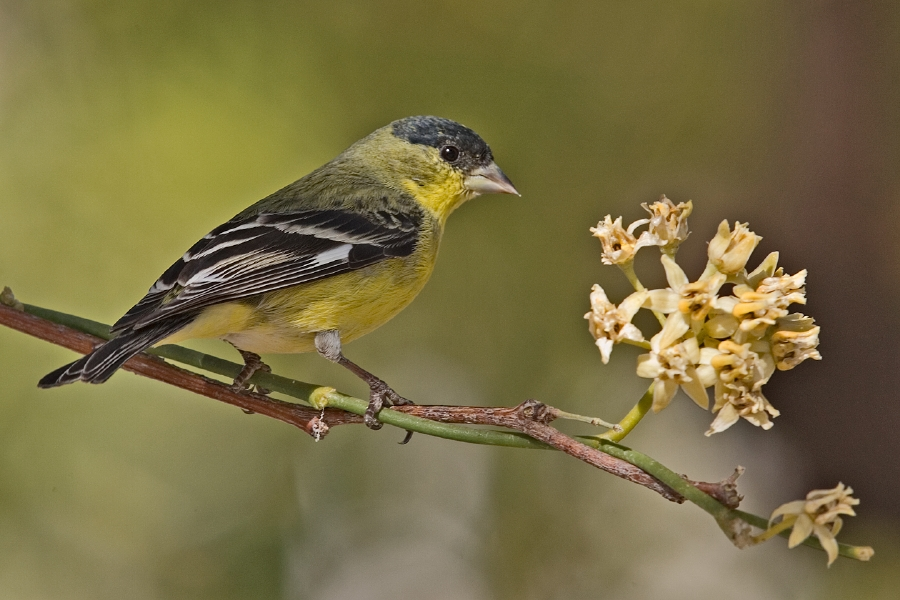
S. p. hesperophilus

Together with its relatives the American goldfinch and Lawrence's goldfinch, it forms a clade, termed the 'New World goldfinch' clade, in the genus Spinus. Some authors have suggested treating this clade as a separate genus Astragalinus, but this has not been followed by either the IOC or BirdLife International.

The lesser goldfinch was formally described by the American zoologist Thomas Say in 1822 under the binomial name Fringilla psaltria. The specific epithet psaltria is Ancient Greek for a female harpist. The type locality is Colorado Springs, Colorado. The lesser goldfinch is now placed in the genus Spinus that was introduced in 1816 by the German naturalist Carl Ludwig Koch.

Five subspecies are currently recognized, though their validity has been questioned:

- S. p. hesperophilus (Oberholser, 1903) – west USA and northwest Mexico
- S. p. witti Grant, PR, 1964 – Tres Marias Islands (off west Mexico)
- S. p. psaltria (Say, 1822) – west-central USA to south-central Mexico
- S. p. jouyi (Ridgway, 1898) – southeast Mexico and northwest Belize
- S. p. colombianus (Lafresnaye, 1843) – south Mexico to Peru and Venezuela

== Description ==
This species is not only the smallest North American Spinus finch, it may be the smallest true finch in the world. Some sources list more subtropical Spinus species as slightly smaller on average, including the Andean siskin (Spinus spinescens). This species ranges from 9 to 12 cm (3.5 to 4.7 in) in length and can weigh from 8 to 11.5 g (0.28 to 0.41 oz). Among standard measurements, the wing chord is 5.5 to 7 cm (2.2 to 2.8 in), the tail is 3.9 to 4.7 cm (1.5 to 1.9 in), the bill is 0.9 to 1.1 cm (0.35 to 0.43 in) and the tarsus is 1.1 to 1.2 cm (0.43 to 0.47 in). There is a slight northwest-southeast cline in size, with the largest birds from Mexico and further south being up to one-fifth larger than the smallest from the extreme northwest of its range; this effect is more pronounced in females. There is also considerable variation in the amount of black on the head and back in males and thus five subspecies have been proposed. But this variation, too, seems to be simple and clinal changes in allele frequency and thus the "subspecies" might be better considered color morphs or geographic forms.

Males are easily recognized by their bright yellow underparts and big white patches in the tail (outer rectrices) and on the wings (the base of the primaries). They range from having solid black from the back to the upper head including the ear-coverts to having these regions medium green; each of the back, crown and ear regions varies in darkness rather independently though; as a rule, the ears are not darker than the rest. In most of the range, dark birds termed psaltria (the black-backed goldfinch) predominate. The light birds are termed hesperophilus (the green-backed goldfinch) and are most common in the far western U.S. and northwestern Mexico.

The zone in which both light and dark males occur on a regular basis is broadest in the north and extends across the width of the Rocky Mountains and the Sierra Madre Occidental ranges. It reaches the Pacific Coast in southern Sonora to northern Sinaloa, roughly between the area of Ciudad Obregón to Culiacán. In the United States, the most diverse array of phenotypes can be found in Colorado and New Mexico. East of the 106th meridian west in southwestern Texas, as well as in most of Mexico, almost all males have black backs. S. p. colombianus, found east and south of the Isthmus of Tehuantepec, is a richer yellow below in males. This subspecies, as well as the even yellower S. p. jouyi from the Yucatán Peninsula and adjacent regions of Mexico and S. p. witti from the Tres Marías Islands off Nayarit require more study, especially since at least the former two also seem to be significantly larger and longer-billed.

Females' and immatures' upperparts are more or less grayish olive-green; their underparts are yellowish, buffier in immatures. They have only a narrow strip of white on the wings (with other white markings in some forms) and little or no white on the tail. They are best distinguished from other members of the genus by the combination of small size, upperparts without white or yellow, and dark gray bill. In all plumages, this bird can easily be taken for a New World warbler if the typical finch bill is not seen well.

Like other goldfinches, it has an undulating flight in which it frequently gives a call: in this case, a harsh chig chig chig. Another distinctive call is a very high-pitched, drawn-out whistle, often rising from one level pitch to another (teeeyeee) or falling (teeeyooo). The song is a prolonged warble or twitter, more phrased than that of the American goldfinch, often incorporating imitations of other species.

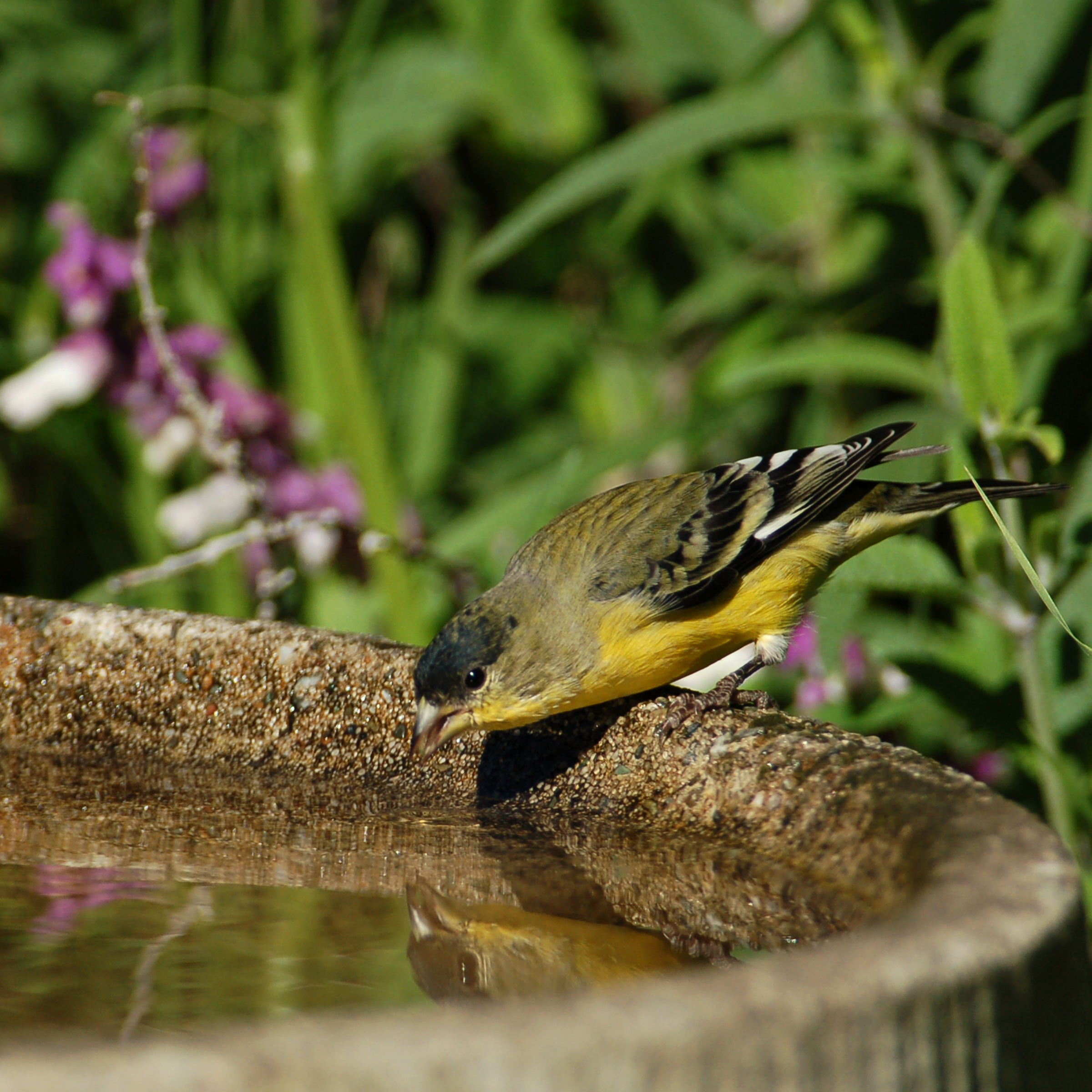
Intermediate male;
note mottled back and cap

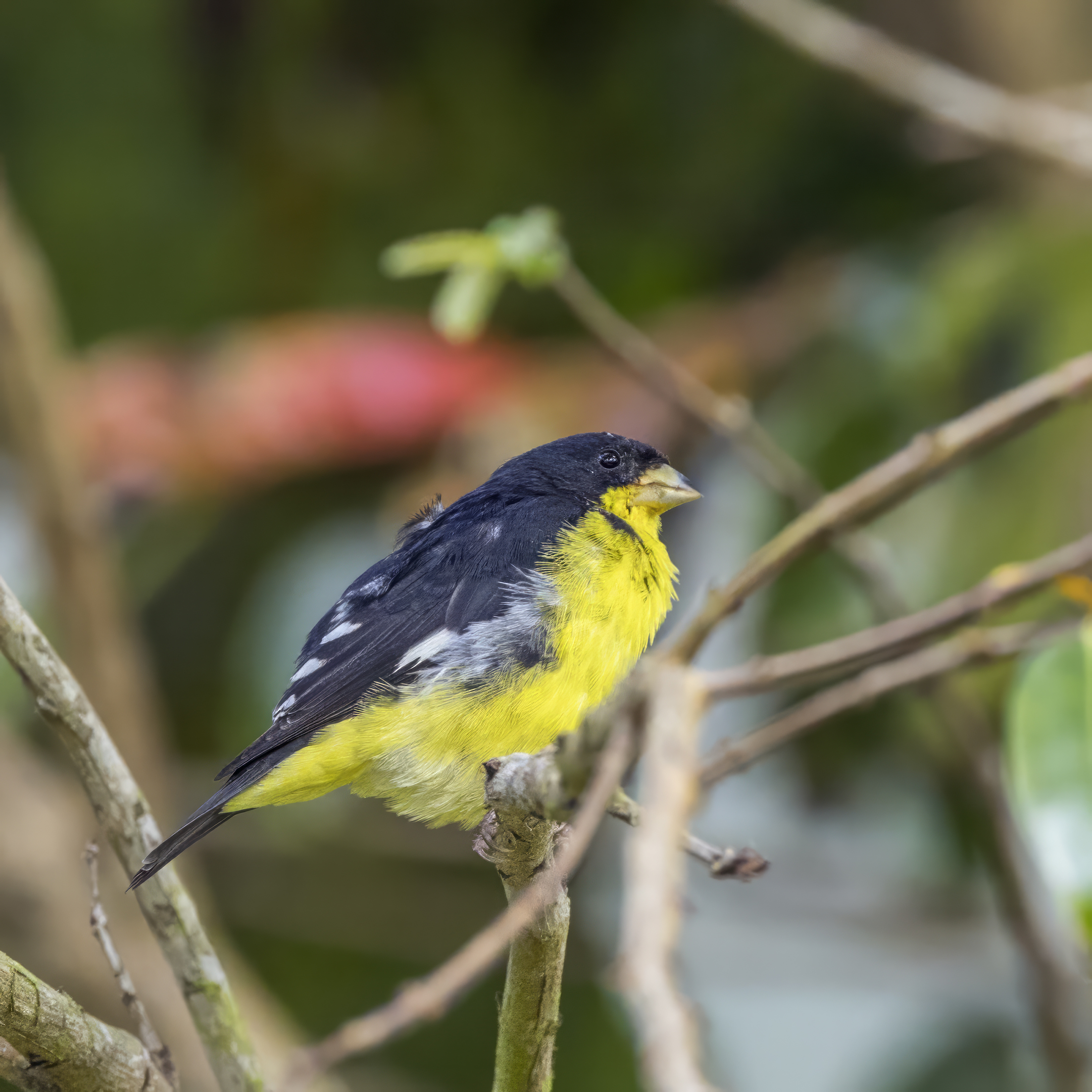
male S. p. colombianus, Colombia

S. p. hesperophilus at Desert Botanical Garden, Phoenix

== Distribution and habitat ==
This goldfinch ranges from the southwestern United States to as far north as the Columbia River in Washington and south to Venezuela and Peru. It seasonally migrates out of parts of its U.S. range, but is resident year-round in others, and has rapidly expanded across much of the Pacific Northwest in recent decades as a year-round resident.

The lesser goldfinch often occurs in flocks or at least loose associations. It utilizes almost any habitat with trees or shrubs except for dense forest, and is common and conspicuous in many areas, often coming near houses. It is common at feeders in the Southwest United States and will come almost anywhere with thistle sock feeders. Flocks of at least six birds will often be seen at feeders. It feeds mostly on tree buds and weed seeds; geophagy has been observed in this species.

The nesting season is in summer in the temperate parts of its range; in the tropics it apparently breeds all-year round, perhaps less often in September and October. It lays three to six bluish white eggs in a cup nest made of fine plant materials such as lichens, rootlets, and strips of bark, placed in a bush or at low or middle levels in a tree, around 4 to 8 ft (1.2 to 2.4 m) or higher off the ground. Egg incubation lasts 12-13 days, and the nestling period lasts 12-14 days.

The molt occurs in two different patterns which coincide with the blackness of the upperparts quite well. Here too is a broad zone of intergradation. Pacific birds molt after breeding, and females shed a few body feathers before breeding too. Juvenile males shed more remiges than females when molting into adult plumage. East of the 106th meridian west, birds molt strongly before breeding and replace another quantity of feathers afterwards, and post-juvenile molt does not differ significantly between the sexes. However, this seems dependent on the differing rainfall regimes; simply put, birds at least anywhere in the North American range molt most of their plumage at the end of the dry season and may replace more feathers at the end of the wet season.

Considered a species of Least Concern by the IUCN due to its vast range, it nonetheless seems to be declining locally. For example, it is rare in the Ecuadorean Andes foothills.
