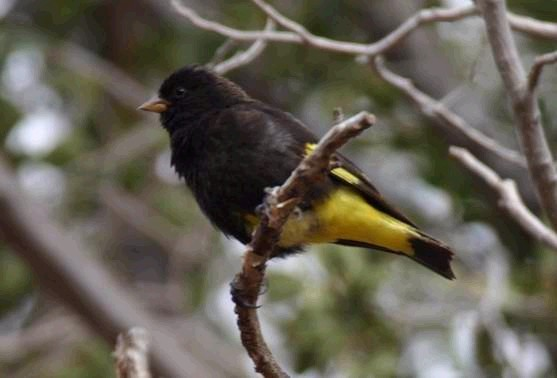

Conservation status
- Least Concern (IUCN 3.1)

Scientific classification
- Kingdom: Animalia
- Phylum: Chordata
- Class: Aves
- Order: Passeriformes
- Family: Fringillidae
- Subfamily: Carduelinae
- Genus: Spinus
- Species: S. atratus

Binomial name
- Spinus atratus (Lafresnaye & d'Orbigny, 1837)

Synonyms
- Sporagra atrata; Carduelis atrata

= Black siskin =

Species of bird

The black siskin (Spinus atratus) is a species of bird in the family Fringillidae, the finches and euphonias. It is found in Argentina, Bolivia, Chile, and Peru.

== Taxonomy and systematics ==
The black siskin was originally described in 1837 with the binomial Carduelis atratus. It was later moved to what was then the subgenus Spinus within genus Carduelis and also spent time in genus Sporagra. Beginning in about 2009 the subgenus was elevated to full genus level and the black siskin, the rest of the New World siskins, and the New World goldfinches were therefore elevated to now-genus Spinus.

The black siskin is monotypic.

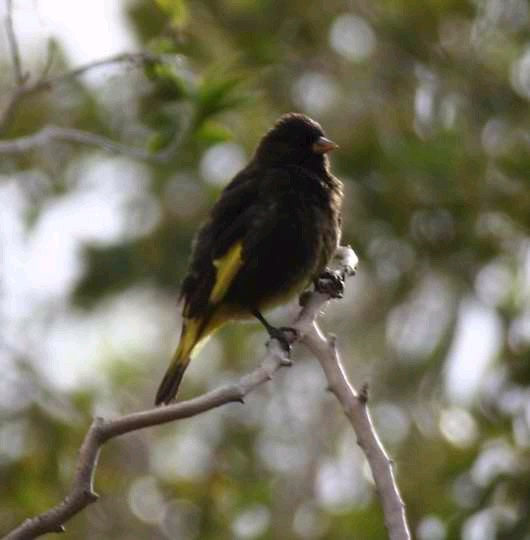
Juvenile black siskin

== Description ==
The black siskin is 12 to 13 cm (4.7 to 5.1 in) long and weighs about 15 to 17 g (0.53 to 0.60 oz). The species is sexually dimorphic but not dramatically so. Adult males are almost entirely glossy black. The sides of the bases of their tail feathers are bright yellow. Their wings' greater coverts have yellow tips and the flight feathers have wide yellow bands across their bases. Their vent and undertail coverts are bright yellow. Adult females have slightly browner upperparts than males. The yellow parts of their tail and wings are paler than those of males. Their underparts are variable; their breast and belly can be yellow and sometimes there is dark mottling on the breast and flanks. Juveniles are similar to adult females though overall duller and browner and have paler yellow areas. Both sexes have a black iris, a dark horn maxilla, a lighter horn mandible, and dark brown or blackish brown legs and feet. The black siskin can be confused with the yellow-rumped siskin (Spinus uropygialis) where their ranges overlap in Bolivia.

== Distribution and habitat ==
The black siskin is found along the Andes from eastern Ancash and western Huánuco departments in north-central Peru south through western Bolivia to northern Chile's Antofagasta Region and west-central Argentina's Mendoza Province. It is a bird of the puna and Altiplano, biomes characterized by rocky hillsides, crags, and gullies with grasses, cushion plants, and scattered shrubs and scrub. It also occurs along the edges of woodlands and cultivated areas and around human-inhabited areas. Overall it ranges in elevation from 1,800 to 4,800 m (5,900 to 15,700 ft). In Peru it ranges between 3,500 and 4,700 m (11,500 and 15,400 ft).

== Behavior ==
=== Movement ===
The black siskin is generally a year-round resident but some individuals move to lower elevations after the breeding season.

=== Feeding ===
The black siskin feeds primarily on seeds. It forages in pairs and small flocks during the breeding season and in larger flocks after it; the latter may include other species of siskin. It forages on the ground and in low vegetation.

=== Breeding ===
The black siskin's breeding season has not been defined but appears to span at least November to April. Nothing else is known about the species' breeding biology.

=== Vocalization ===
The black siskin's song is not well known but appears to be similar to that of the yellow-rumped siskin (S. uropygialis). The species sings from a perch atop a bush or tree and also in flight. Its calls are mostly given in flight and include "a descending tew, chew, and a hew-li?".

== Status ==
The IUCN has assessed the black siskin as being of Least Concern. It has a large range; its population size is not known but is believed to be stable. No immediate threats have been identified. However, it is often trapped illegally for the pet trade. It is considered uncommon to locally common overall and uncommon to fairly common in Peru.
