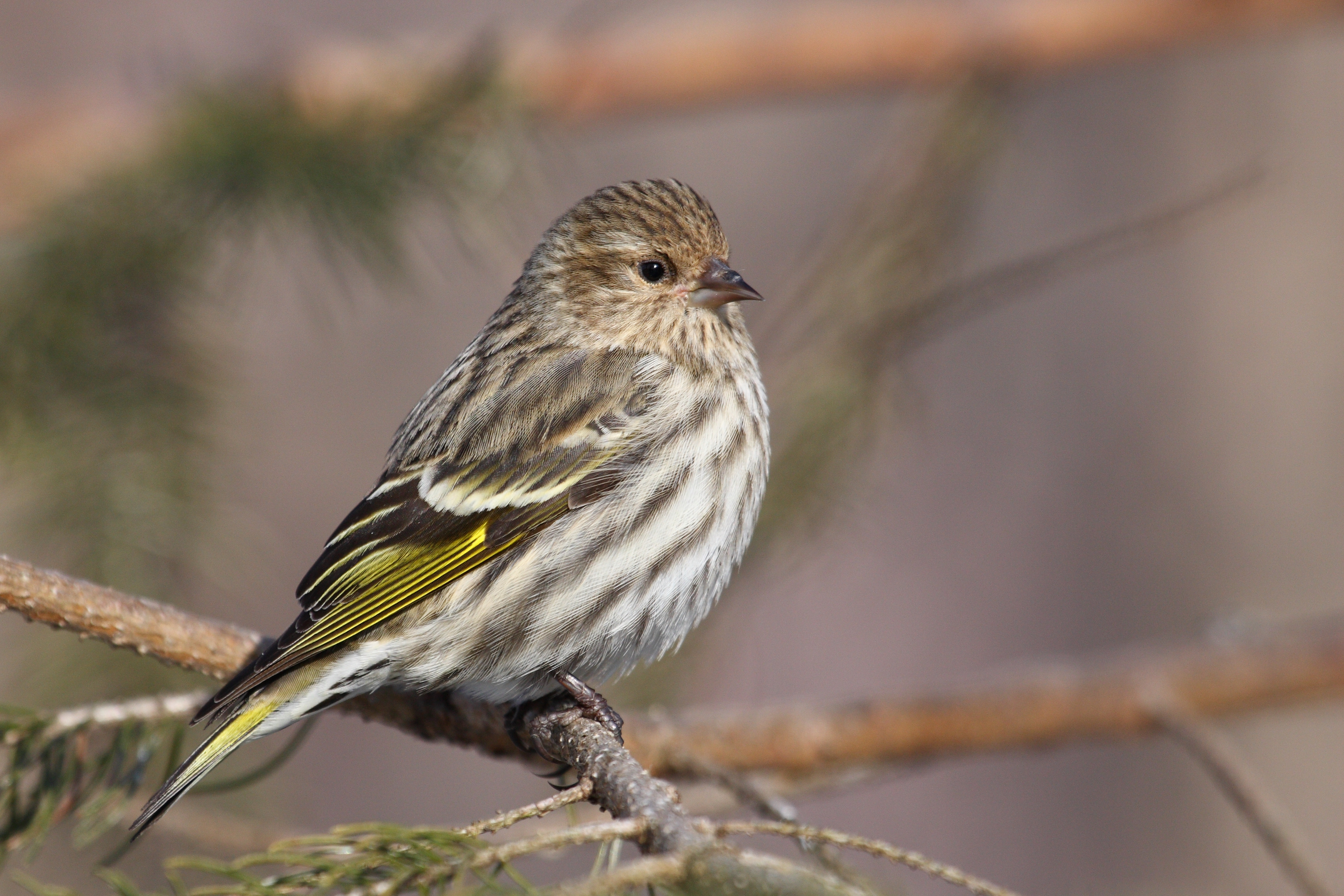

Conservation status
- Least Concern (IUCN 3.1)

Scientific classification
- Kingdom: Animalia
- Phylum: Chordata
- Class: Aves
- Order: Passeriformes
- Family: Fringillidae
- Subfamily: Carduelinae
- Genus: Spinus
- Species: S. pinus

Binomial name
- Spinus pinus (Wilson, 1810)
- Geographical distribution of pine siskin. A small portion in western Guatemala is not shown. Breeding Year-round Nonbreeding Nonbreeding (scarce)

Synonyms
- Fringilla pinus (protonym); Carduelis pinus

Audio

= Pine siskin =

Species of bird

The pine siskin (Spinus pinus) is a North American bird in the finch family. It is a migratory bird with an extremely sporadic winter range.

The pine siskin is currently listed as a species of Least Concern on the IUCN Red List.

== Taxonomy ==
The pine siskin was formally described in 1810 by the American ornithologist Alexander Wilson under the binomial name Fringilla pinus. The specific epithet pinus is the Latin word for a "pine-tree". The type locality is Philadelphia, Pennsylvania. The pine siskin is now placed in the genus Spinus that was introduced in 1816 by the German naturalist Carl Ludwig Koch in 1816.

Three subspecies are recognised:

- S. p. pinus (Wilson, A, 1810) – Alaska, Canada and west, northeast USA
- S. p. macropterus (Bonaparte, 1850) – northwest and central Mexico
- S. p. perplexus Van Rossem, 1938 – south Mexico to Guatemala

== Description ==
These birds are fairly small, being around the same size as the widespread American goldfinch. In both sexes, total length can range from 11–14 cm (4.3–5.5 in), with a wingspan of 18–22 cm (7.1–8.7 in) and a weight of 12–18 g (0.42–0.63 oz).

Adults are brown on the upperparts and pale on the underparts, with heavy streaking throughout. They have short, forked tails. Their bills are conical like most finches but are more elongated and slender than those of other co-occurring finches. Variably, pine siskins have yellow patches on their wings and tails, which may also consist of white streaks on the wings. Although they can be confused by the more inexperienced for other finches or even American sparrows, pine siskins are distinguished by their heavy streaking, relatively slender bills, notched tail, yellow or whitish patches on the wings and smallish size.

=== Separation from the Eurasian siskin ===
The pine siskin in its typical morph is a drab bird, whereas the Eurasian siskin (a bird the species does not naturally co-exist with), in many plumages, is much brighter. Adult male Eurasian siskins are bright green and yellow with a black cap, and an unstreaked throat and breast; the pine siskin does not have a corresponding bright plumage. Adult female Eurasian siskins also usually have green and yellow plumage tones: for example, yellow in the supercilium and on the sides of the breast, green tones in the mantle and yellow in the rump. Adult pine siskins of the typical morph do not have green and yellow tones, although juveniles can have a yellowish-buff wash on their underparts and buff-toned wingbars, for a short period prior to their autumn migration. The ground colour of the underparts of the Eurasian siskin is normally pure white, whereas on the pine siskin it is usually a dirtier colour. In female and juvenile Eurasian siskins, the centre of the belly and lower breast are often largely or entirely unstreaked, whereas in most pine siskins the streaking extends across the whole of the underparts. The wingbars of the Eurasian siskin are broad and yellow (with the tips white) whereas they are normally narrower and buffish white in the pine siskin, contrasting with the bright yellow flash at the base of the primaries. Pine siskins have a longer bill, usually with a straight culmen, compare with a short bill in Eurasian siskins, with a decurved culmen. There is a green morph of the pine siskin, closer in appearance to the Eurasian siskin; these birds make up only 1% of the population. These are closer in appearance to female Eurasian siskins, but differ in that they have a yellow wash on the undertail-coverts (white on the Eurasian siskin), no yellow in the supercilium, reduced underparts streaking, and much yellow at the base of the tail and remiges; there may also be a difference in the extent of yellow in the underparts, but this needs further study.

== Distribution and habitat ==
Their breeding range spreads across almost the entirety of Canada, Alaska, and to a more variable degree, across the western mountains and northern parts of the United States. As their name indicates, the species occurs mostly as a breeder in open conifer forests. Northern pine forests support the majority of the species' breeding population. However, stands of ornamental conifers or deciduous trees may support nesting birds in partially developed parks, cemeteries, and suburban woodlands. While they favor feeding in open forest canopies where cone seeds are abundant, they'll forage in habitats as diverse as deciduous forests and thickets, meadows, grasslands, weedy fields, roadsides, chaparral, and backyard gardens and lawns. They flock to backyard feeders offering small seeds. Indeed some flocks can be large, with 20-30 birds lining up to eat from the same feeder. Mineral deposits can lure them to otherwise unattractive habitats like winter road beds that are salted to melt snow and ice. The nest is well-hidden on a horizontal branch of a tree, often a conifer.

Migration by this bird is highly variable, probably related to food supply. Large numbers may move south in some years; hardly any in others. This species is one of a few species that are considered "irruptive winter finches" because of the high variability of their movements based on the success of crops from year to year.

== Behavior and ecology ==
=== Feeding ===
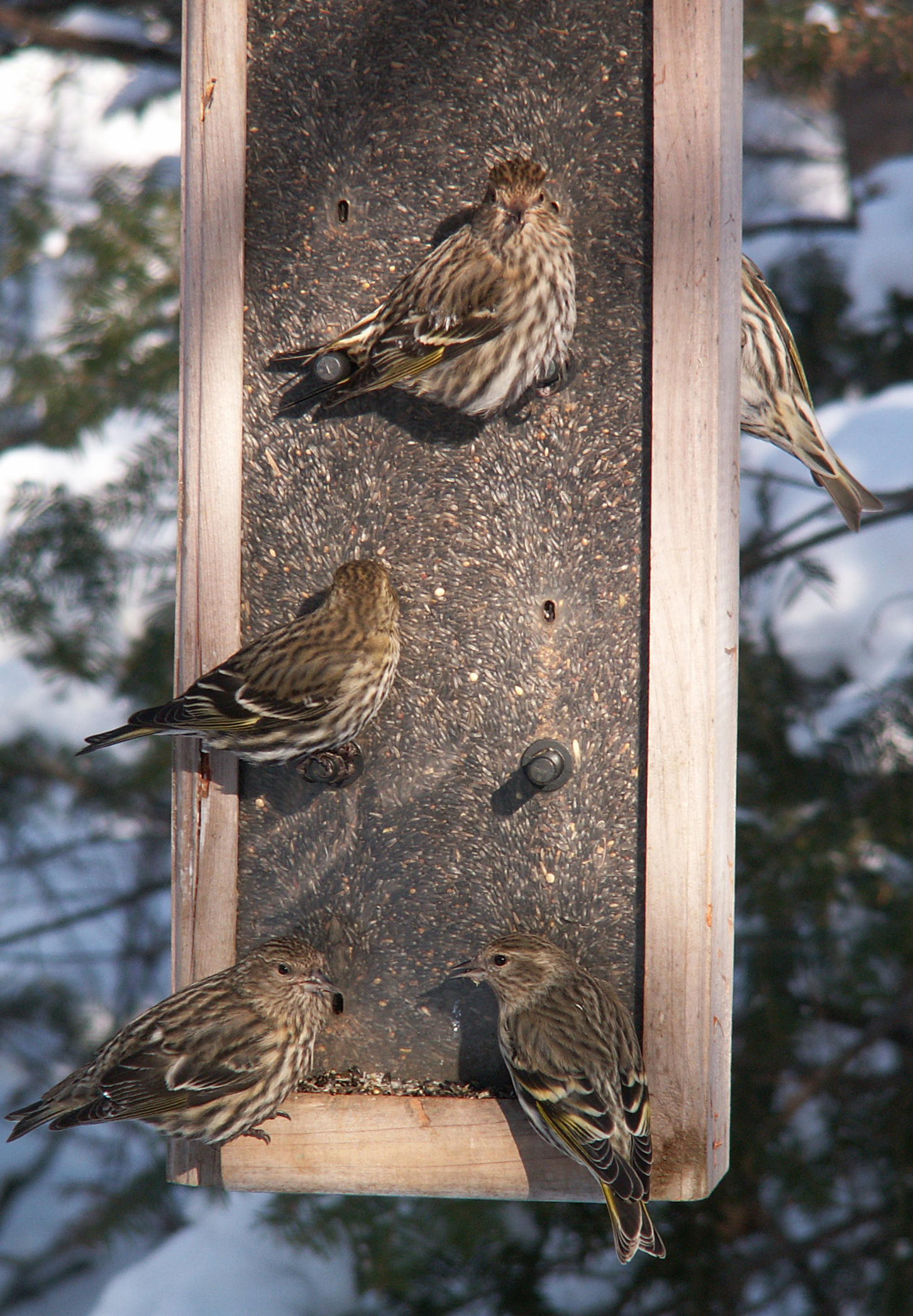
Pine siskins feeding on thistle seeds

These birds forage in trees, shrubs and weeds. They mainly eat seeds, plant parts and some insects. In winter, they often feed in mixed flocks including American goldfinches and redpolls. Small seeds, especially thistle, red alder, birch, and spruce seeds, make up the majority of the pine siskin's diet. In a part of their esophagus called the crop, the species can store up to 10% of their body weight in seeds overnight, providing extra food on cold days. They will alternately eat the young buds of willows, elms and maples, and the soft stems and leaves of weeds and even young garden vegetables. They glean the seeds of grass, dandelions, chickweed, sunflowers and ragweed. Bird feeders often attract pine siskins, where they may eat fragments of heavy-shelled seeds, such as black oil sunflowers, left behind by heavier-billed bird species. In summer, they will eat insects, especially aphids, as well as a few spiders and grubs, which they then feed to the young as a protein-rich food that contributes to their growth. By winter, even first-year siskins predominantly eat seeds.

Pine siskins can survive in very cold temperatures. The Metabolic rates of this species are typically 40% higher than those of a "normal" songbird of their size. When temperatures plunge as low as −70 °C (−94 °F), they can accelerate that rate up to five times normal for several hours. They also put on half again as much winter fat as their common redpoll and American goldfinch relatives. They can also protect their young from cold. Nests are often heavily insulated with thick plant materials and females may never cease incubating their eggs and hatchlings, while being fed by their male mate.

== Conservation status ==
Despite being a species of low concern, the pine siskin has suffered a significant annual decline in population since 1966. Due to the irruptive nature of this species, population counts vary widely from year to year, making trends difficult to interpret. Parasitism by brown-headed cowbirds can have a significant impact on pine siskin productivity, and forest fragmentation has increased their contact with cowbirds. Maintaining large tracts of coniferous forest will help keep this bird common. Pine Siskins may also be uniquely susceptible to Salmonella among finches.
