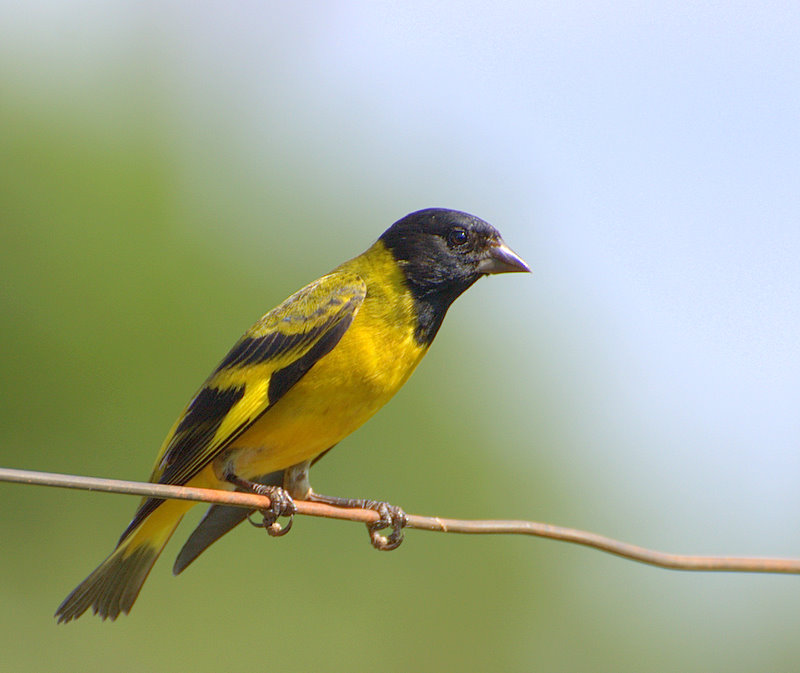
- Male near Piraju (São Paulo, Brazil)

Conservation status
- Least Concern (IUCN 3.1)

Scientific classification
- Kingdom: Animalia
- Phylum: Chordata
- Class: Aves
- Order: Passeriformes
- Family: Fringillidae
- Subfamily: Carduelinae
- Genus: Spinus
- Species: S. magellanicus

Binomial name
- Spinus magellanicus (Vieillot, 1805)

Synonyms
- Sporagra magellanica Carduelis magellanica Carduelis santaecrucis (but see text)

Audio
- Song

= Hooded siskin =

Species of bird

The hooded siskin (Spinus magellanicus) is a small passerine bird in the family Fringillidae, the finches and euphonias. It is found in every mainland South American country except French Guiana and Suriname.

== Taxonomy and systematics ==
The hooded siskin has a complicated taxonomic history and as of early 2026 its taxonomy has not been fully resolved. It was originally described in 1805 with the binomial Fringilla magellanica. It was later moved to what was then the subgenus Spinus within genus Carduelis and also spent time in genus Sporagra. Beginning in about 2009 the subgenus was elevated to full genus level and the hooded siskin, the rest of the New World siskins, and the New World goldfinches were therefore elevated to now-genus Spinus.

The IOC, AviList, and BirdLife International's Handbook of the Birds of the World assign it these 12 subspecies.

- S. m. capitalis (Cabanis, 1866)
- S. m. paulus Todd, 1926
- S. m. peruanus Berlepsch & Stolzmann, 1896
- S. m. urubambensis Todd, 1926
- S. m. santaecrucis Todd, 1926
- S. m. bolivianus (Sharpe, 1888)
- S. m. hoyi (König, C, 1981)
- S. m. tucumanus Todd, 1926
- S. m. alleni Ridgway, 1899
- S. m. ictericus (Lichtenstein, MHC, 1823)
- S. m. magellanicus (Vieillot, 1805)
- S. m. longirostris (Sharpe, 1888)

The status of some subspecies is not resolved. During much of the twentieth century several authors treated S. m. santaecrucis as a full species but since late in that century it has generally been accepted in its subspecific position. A 2020 publication suggested that the hooded siskin is paraphyletic, consisting of at least two species.

As of its 2025 update, the Clements taxonomy does not recognize S. m. hoyi, apparently including it within S. m. tucumanus. Clements recognizes some distinctions among the subspecies of the hooded siskin. It calls S. m. longirostris the "hooded siskin (Guianan)" and groups S. m. alleni, S. m. ictericus, and S. m. magellanicus as the "hooded siskin (lowland)". It treats the other subspecies as the "hooded siskin (Andean)".

Several of the subspecies readily hybridize with other siskins where their ranges overlap. In captivity the species has also been crossed with the domestic canary (Serinus canaria domestica) and other finches.

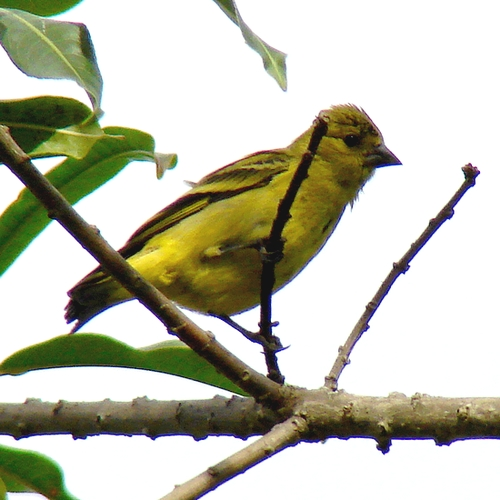
Female in Brazil

== Description ==
The hooded siskin is 10 to 12 cm (3.9 to 4.7 in) long. and weighs about 11 g (0.39 oz). The species is sexually dimorphic.

Adult males of the nominate subspecies S. m. magellanicus have an entirely black head, throat, and upper breast. They have a bright yellow collar on the nape and the sides of their neck. Their lower nape, back, and scapulars are olive green with faint dark streaks. Their rump is bright yellow and their uppertail coverts are olive green. Their tail is mostly black with wide deep yellow edges on all but the innermost pair of feathers. Their wings have a complicated pattern. The upperwing coverts are blackish brown. The greater coverts are blackish brown with pale olive green or bright yellow tips. The primary coverts and flight feathers are mostly black with bright yellow bases on the primaries and secondaries; these form a band across the wing. The tertials are mostly black with yellowish edges at the base and white tips. Their underparts from the lower breast are bright yellow that sometimes has an orange tinge on the sides of the breast and a greenish tinge on the flanks and belly.

Adult females have no black on the head; it and their back are dull olive or olive green with a gray tinge. Their rump is yellow or yellowish green and their uppertail coverts green. Their tail is like the male's. Their wings are similar to the male's but have yellow or buffish tips on the upperwing coverts and less yellow on the bases of the flight feathers. Their chin and throat are pale grayish or grayish olive, their breast greenish, and their belly and undertail coverts more whitish than the breast. Juveniles are similar to adult females. However, they have a buffish olive head and back with thin darker streaks. Their rump and uppertail coverts are pale olive green. The tips of their wing coverts are whitish to bright yellow. Their underparts are like the female's with a grayish wash and their undertail coverts have a pale yellow tinge. Both sexes of all subspecies have a black iris, a dark grayish black bill, and dark gray or blackish legs and feet.

The other subspecies of the hooded siskin differ from the nominate and each other thus:

- S. m. capitalis: Male has darker olive upperparts than nominate with wide white or grayish white edges and tips on flight feathers, yellow at base of all tail feathers, and more golden-yellow underparts. Female has yellower upperparts than nominate with pale gray underparts and light olive or yellowish wash on throat and breast.
- S. m. paulus: Male has darker olive upperparts than nominate with bright yellow rump, more yellow in wing and tail, and greenish yellow underparts. Female has grayer upperparts than nominate with yellowish rump; underparts like the male.
- S. m. peruanus: Male has greener upperparts than paulus with dull yellow rump. Female has more olive upperparts than paulus.
- S. m. urubambensis: Male like peruanus. Female variable but often like nominate.
- S. m. santaecrucis: Male has light olive green back and uppertail coverts with darker mottling, yellowish rump, bright yellow tips on wing coverts, yellow edges and whitish tips on tertials, and wide yellow edges on tail base.
- S. m. bolivianus: Male has prominent blackish streaks on upperparts, blackish uppertail coverts, and wide yellow on base of tail.
- S. m. tucumanus: Male's black head extends only to upper nape and throat; underparts are pale yellow with whitish flanks
- S. m. hoyi: like tucumanus
- S. m. alleni: Male has darker olive upperparts than nominate with bright yellow rump, wide white or grayish white edges and tips on flight feathers, olive yellow edges on tertials, yellow at base of all tail feathers, and yellow underparts.
- S. m. ictericus: Male much like alleni with more yellow on wing coverts and base of tail and less yellow underparts.
- S. m. longirostris: Male's black hood does not include the upper breast; whitish lower belly and vent. Female has pale gray vent and undertail coverts. Both sexes have pale green rump and uppertail coverts.

== Distribution and habitat ==
The hooded siskin is the most widespread member of genus Spinus. The subspecies are found thus:

- S. m. capitalis: from Tolima Department in western Colombia south through Ecuador's central Andes into northwestern Peru's La Libertad Department
- S. m. paulus: from Guayas Province in southwestern Ecuador south to Arequipa in southwestern Peru
- S. m. peruanus: central Peru from Huánuco to Ayacucho and Cuzco departments
- S. m. urubambensis: from Cuzco south into northern Chile's Tarapacá Region
- S. m. santaecrucis: western Santa Cruz Department in central Bolivia
- S. m. bolivianus: central and southern Bolivia
- S. m. hoyi: central Andes in northwestern Argentina
- S. m. tucumanus: western Andes in northwestern Argentina's Jujuy, Santiago del Estero, and Santa Fe to Mendoza provinces
- S. m. alleni: southeastern Bolivia east through Paraguay to northeastern Argentina and southern Brazil
- S. m. ictericus: from Minas Gerais in eastern Brazil south to eastern and southern Paraguay and northeastern Argentina's Misiones and northern Corrientes provinces
- S. m. magellanicus: Uruguay and northern and eastern Argentina from southern Corrientes to Río Negro Province
- S. m. longirostris separate from the others; from southeastern Bolívar state in Venezuela east into western Guyana and extreme northern Brazil's Roraima state

The hooded siskin inhabits a wide variety of landscapes. These include forests from the lowlands to the lower montane zone, secondary forest, savanna with individual and clusters of trees, and cocoa and palm plantations. It also occurs in open areas with scrub and brush, the edges of cultivated areas, and suburban parks and gardens. In northern Chile it favors Polylepis forest. In elevation overall it ranges from sea level to about 5,000 m (16,000 ft). It reaches 1,300 m (4,300 ft) in Venezuela, 2,500 m (8,200 ft) in Brazil, and 4,200 m (13,800 ft) in Peru. In Colombia it ranges from 2,200 to 3,600 m (7,200 to 11,800 ft) and in Ecuador mostly from 1,000 to 3,500 m (3,300 to 11,500 ft) but lower in Loja Province.

== Behavior ==
=== Movement ===
Most populations of the hooded siskin are non-migratory but highly nomadic within their ranges. Subspecies S. m. tucumanus has a complicated migratory pattern. It breeds at high elevation in northwestern Argentina and in winter descends to lower elevations, where a few remain though winter, and mostly then moves north into Bolivia.

=== Feeding ===
The hooded siskin feeds primarily on a wide variety of seeds but also includes buds, leaves, flowers and nectar, fruits, and small arthropods in its diet. It has also been observed ingesting sand, apparently for its gritty texture to aid in breaking down food. In the non-breeding season it often forages in flocks of up to about 13 individuals than may include as many as seven species.

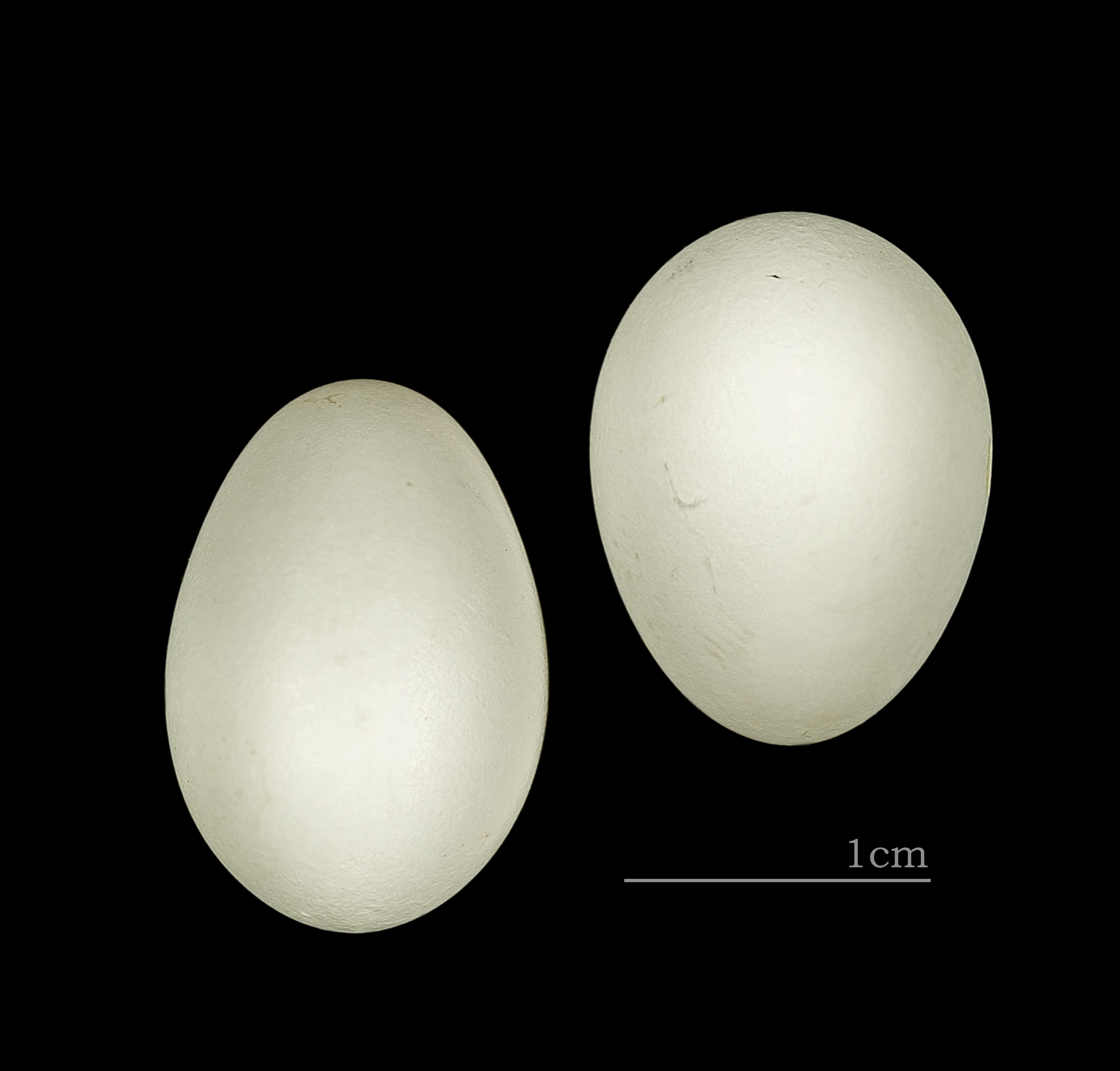
Carduelis magellanica eggs MHNT

=== Breeding ===
The hooded siskin's breeding season has not been fully defined but is known to vary geographically. In Peru it apparently spans from October to June and in Argentina from October to February. The species' nest is an open cup made from thin twigs and plant fibers bound with spider web and lined with softer plant fibers, rootlets, and hair. Nests have been noted in trees and on human structures up to about 4 m (13 ft) above the ground. The clutch is three or four eggs that are pale with a few small dark brown spots. The incubation period appears to be about 13 days and fledging occurs about 16 days after hatch. The female alone incubates and both parents provision nestlings. The shiny cowbird (Molothrus bonariensis) is a frequent nest parasite.

=== Vocalization ===
The hooded siskin typically sings from an open perch and also in flight; it sings for long periods. Its song is "a varied series of rapid short twittering tseet-tseet, tseet-weet, or tseet-weet-a-weeta interspersed with repeated phrases; several males often sing in concert". Its calls include "a light or lilting djey, djey; tseeu; and a long trilling trrrrrr".

== Status ==
The IUCN has assessed the hooded siskin as being of Least Concern. It has an extremely large range; its population size is not known and is believed to be decreasing. No immediate threats have been identified. However, it is often trapped illegally for the pet trade, especially in Argentina. It is "uncommon, nomadic, and unpredictable" in Venezuela, "locally fairly common" in Colombia, and "easily the most numerous siskin" in Ecuador. It is "common to frequent" in the southern half of its Brazilian range and "frequent to uncommon" in the northern half. In Peru it is common on the western Andean slope and uncommon on the eastern.
