= La Iglesia de El Sagrario =

La Iglesia de El Sagrario, or La Iglesia del Sagrario (Spanish, “Church of the Sanctuary” or “Church of the Shrine”) may refer to:

- Iglesia del Sagrario (Lima), Peru, a chapel attached to Lima's Cathedral
- Iglesia de El Sagrario, Quito, Ecuador, a chapel attached to the Quito Cathedral
- Iglesia del Sagrario in Cuenca or Old Cathedral of Cuenca, a museum in Cuenca, Ecuador
- Iglesia del Sagrario, Jaén, Spain, a chapel attached to the Jaén Cathedral
- Iglesia del Sagrario, in Málaga, Spain
- Catedral e Iglesia del Sagrario, Granada, Spain

== See also ==
- Catedral El Sagrario, Rancagua, Chile
