= Juan Bautista Stiehle =

German-born Ecuadorian friar and architect

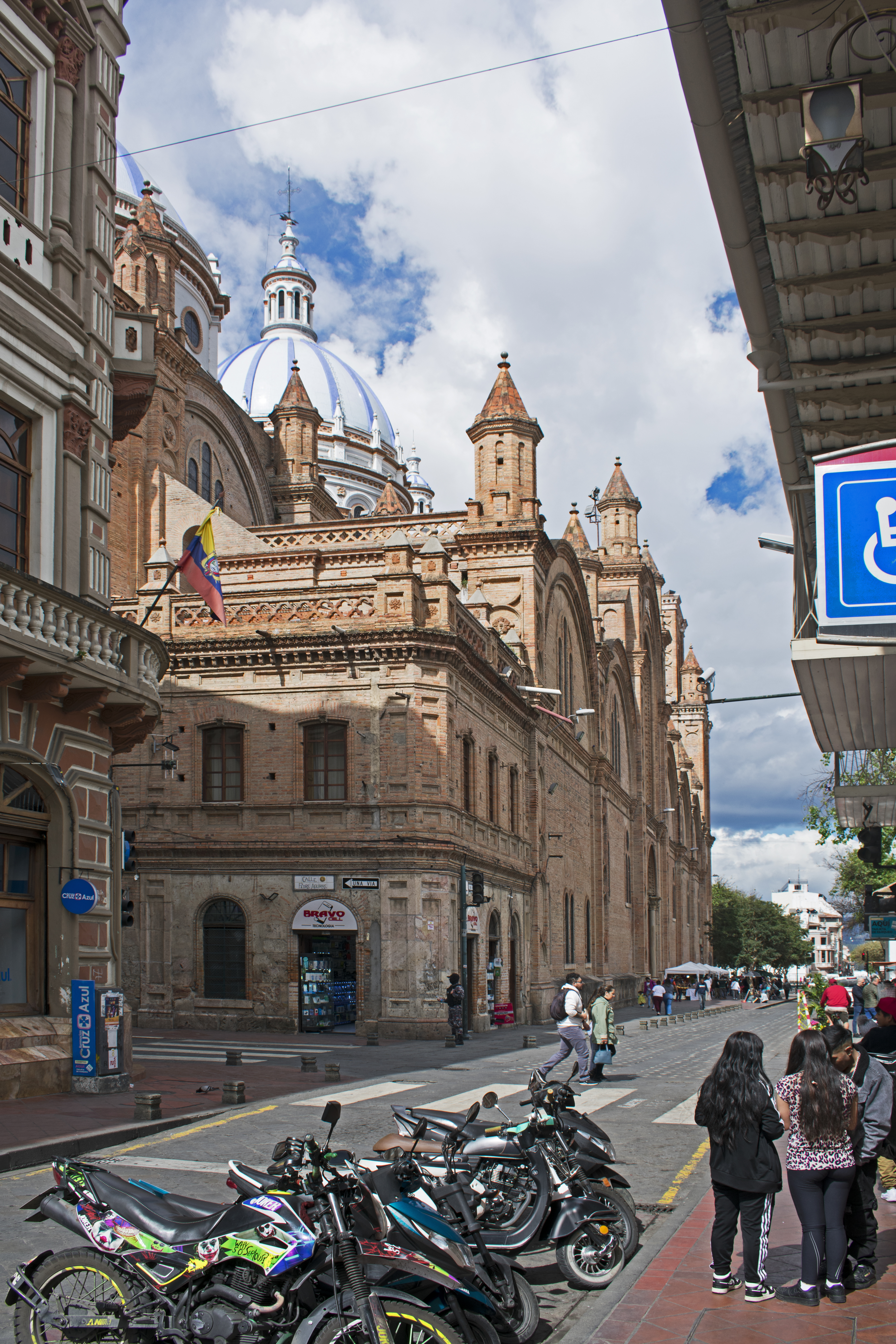
New Cathedral of Cuenca seen from the west

Juan Bautista Stiehle (Johannes Baptista Stiehle, 1829–1899) was a German-born Ecuadorian friar and architect. He is notable for designing a number of churches in Cuenca, Ecuador, including the New Cathedral of Cuenca.

Stiehle was born in Dächingen on 1 June 1829 in a peasant family, eleventh of seventeen children. He worked as a cabinet maker and a blacksmith before in 1850 he travelled to Téterchen in Alsace where he was accepted to the Congregation of the Redemptorist Fathers. In 1871, after France had lost the war, the Redemptorist were expelled from Alsace and Lorraine, and Stiehle had to move to Pérouse near Belfort. After working in France for a long time, in 1873, he was tasked with the construction of a church and a monastery of the Congregation in Cuenca, and he arrived to the city on 2 May that year. He stayed in Ecuador, mainly in Cuenca, until his death 26 years later.

In Cuenca, Stiehle acted as architect, though he never had specialized education. He built several churches (some of which were later demolished), Diocesan seminary, an orphanage, a hospital, and two schools. In particular, he drew the plans for the New Cathedral of Cuenca and supervised its construction until his death (the construction started in 1885 and ended in 1975). He remodeled some houses, drew plans for several streets, as well as constructed several bridges in Cuenca and surroundings. He created a distinctive style, which is described as a mix of Romanesque and Gothic.

Stiehle also produced a number of wood sculptures for churches, including San Alfonso Church in Cuenca and San Alfonso Convent in Riobamba.

In 1893, a strong earthquake destroyed many buildings in Ecuador, and Stiehle was asked to rebuild many of these. His health deteriorated, and he died on 20 January 1899. Originally, Stiehle was buried in the garden of San Alfonso Church in Cuenca, which he designed himself. In the 1980s, the corresponding part of the cemetery was used for construction, and the tombs were moved to the sacristy of the church.

== Buildings ==
- San Alfonso Church, Cuenca (1875–1888);
- New Cathedral of Cuenca (1885–1975, drew plans and supervised until 1899);
- Monastery of El Carmen de San José, Cuenca (demolished);
- Church of the Sacred Heart, Cuenca (demolished);
- Church tower, Cañar;
- Colegio de la Providencia, Azogues;
- Dominican School, Gualaceo.
