= Old Cathedral =

Old Cathedral may refer to:

- A colloquial name for the Basilica of St. Louis, King of France
- Old Cathedral, Brescia, Italy
- Old Cathedral of Coimbra, Portugal
- Old Cathedral of Cuenca, Ecuador
- Old Cathedral of Managua, Nicaragua
- Old Cathedral of Rio de Janeiro
- Old Cathedral, Salamanca, Spain
- Old Saint Mary's Cathedral, California, US
- St. Francis Xavier Cathedral and Library, locally known as the Old Cathedral, Indiana, US
