= Guillermo Larrazábal =

Spanish artist

- Reproduction of a self-portrait of the artist made between 1970 and 1980
- Born: February 10, 1907; Mexico City, Mexico
- Died: July 29/30, 1983 (76 years old); Cuenca, Ecuador

Guillermo Larrazábal Arzubide (10 February 1907 – 1983) was a Spanish stained glass artist who was active in Ecuador. He is considered Ecuador's most important stained glass artist.

== Biography ==
=== Early life and education ===
Guillermo Larrazábal was born in Mexico City on February 10, 1907, while his mother was traveling there. His parents, Juan Domingo Larrazábal Basarrate and Daniela Arzubide Villa, were both from Bilbao, Spain. His father was a businessman who dealt in cacao and coffee. Larrazábal grew up in a grand residence in Bilbao, where he was the youngest of nine children. When he was five, he contracted meningitis and was seriously ill; after he recovered, he was mute for some time. During primary school, he would lock himself in his room to practice speaking in front of a mirror, and he overcame his muteness after many hours of practice. (He continued to speak with a slight stutter, however, for some time.) Larrazábal's father died in 1916. Guillermo Larrazábal had a difficult childhood and was very religious.

Guillermo Larrazábal switched between several schools as a child, including a school for accounting. Professor Adrian Martinez requested that Larrazábal be allowed to study solely art and recommended Larrazábal to several art academies. In 1932, Martinez recommended that he join the studio of Luis Lerchundi, an artist based in Bilbao. Guillermo Larrazábal worked under painter Félix Cañada, who was known for his Art Nouveau works, particularly in Bilbao's Café Iruña (Bilbao). Larrazábal quickly advanced within the studio and soon began learning the techniques of stained glass.

=== Career in Spain ===
During the Spanish Civil War, the Republican faction arrested him based on false accusations and took him to a detention camp. His mother appealed to her friends within the faction for his release. A few weeks later, he was taken prisoner by the Nationalist faction and again freed at the behest of his family. He attempted to lie low following these incidents, but he was found and conscripted into Francisco Franco's army; he painted stamps and flags for Franco up until 1939.

When the war ended in 1939, Larrazábal was penniless. He found work at the studio Vitrieras de Arte (Artistic Stained Glass) in San Sebastián. He produced standardized works and felt oppressed by the lack of creativity he was allowed. In 1951, after 12 years working at the studio, he quit his job and moved to a ceramics factory in Madrid, and married in the same year.

=== Career in Ecuador ===
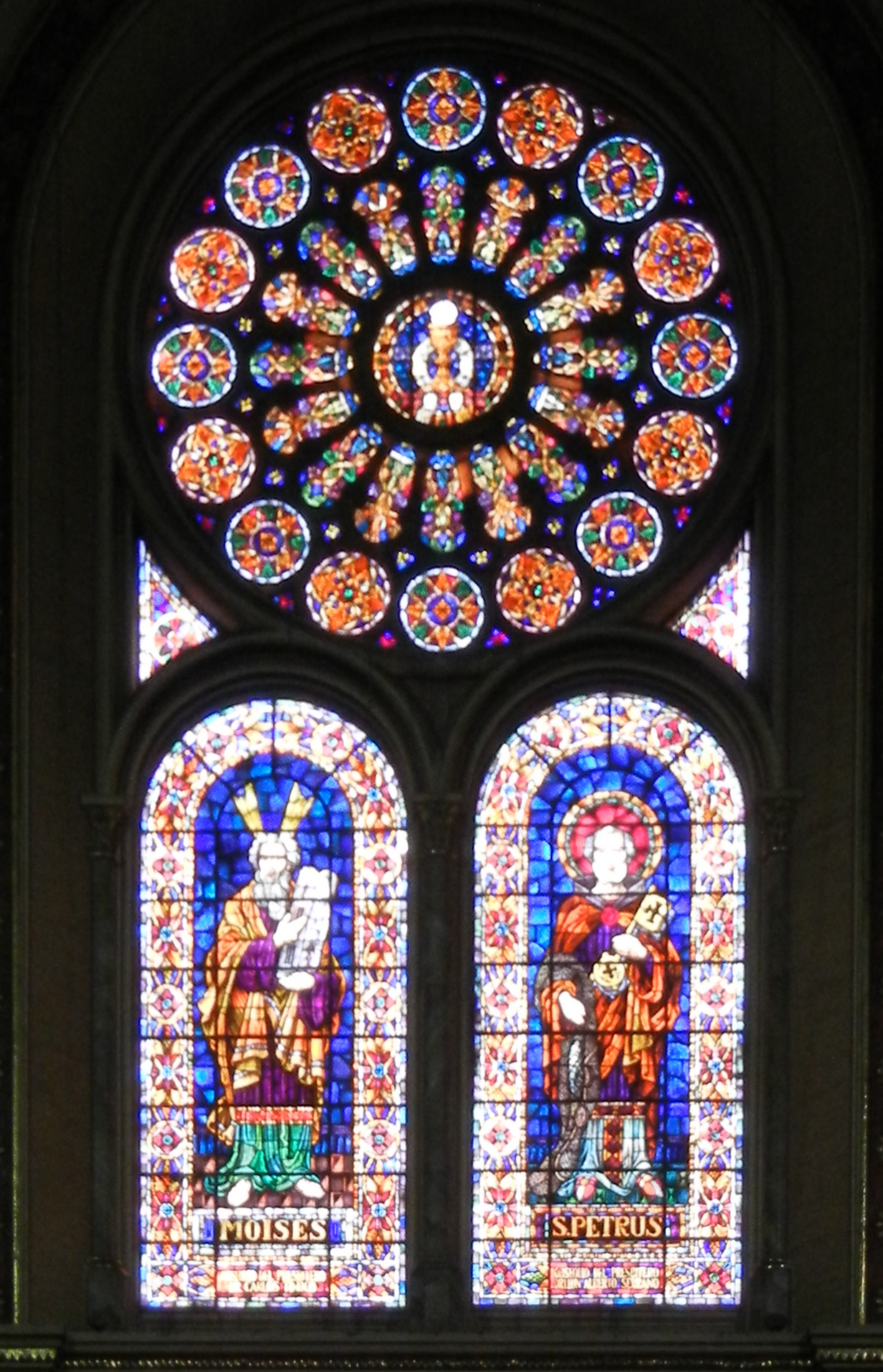
Stained glass windows created by Guillermo Larrazábal in the New Cathedral of Cuenca

In 1955, the Catholic Church in Ecuador was seeking artists in Spain for the construction of the New Cathedral of Cuenca. They chose the Spanish ceramicist Manuel Mora Iñigo as their agent in Spain, and Iñigo contracted with Larrazábal for the creation of the cathedral's stained glass windows. Larrazábal moved to Cuenca, Ecuador in 1955. His wife arrived shortly thereafter, though they soon separated.

Larrazábal completed 60 stained glass windows for Cuenca's cathedral, the largest number of his works in any one location. His work on that cathedral brought him renown throughout the country, leading him to create works for the Cathedral of Guayaquil and Cathedral of Ambato. He also created stained glass windows in Academia Militar de Quito (Quito Military Academy) (closed 1991), Guayaquil's Unidad Educativa San José La Salle, and the Cuenca home of businessman Guillermo Vázquez.

During the remainder of his career, Larrazábal created 87 stained glass works that are located across the vast majority of Ecuador's provinces. Larrazábal died of lung cancer late on July 29, 1983, or in the early morning the following day. His exposure to chemicals used in stained glass making may have caused the disease, given that he had never smoked.

=== Personal life ===
In Ecuador, Larrazábal fell in love with the painter Eudoxia Estrella. They began living with each other in 1960, though Larrazábal was still married to his wife from Spain; his divorce was denied. Estrella continued to be Larrazábal's partner until his death.

== Work ==
According to Luis Alberto Luna Tobar, Larrazábal was "a theologian who meditated with light and color on stained glass, in search of the face of God". Larrazábal's artistic talents were not limited to stained glass; he was also a talented painter, sculptor, potter, and photographer. In his later years, he devoted a fair portion of his time to photography.

== Legacy ==
The Galería Larrazábal in Cuenca, named in his honor, is located at the former site of his studio. The first exhibition of Larrazábal's work took place in Cuenca in 2012 and later traveled to other cities in Ecuador. A second exhibition took place in Quito's Pontificia Universidad Católica del Ecuador in 2013.
