= Jaén Cathedral =

Cathedral in Jaén, Andalucía, Spain

- Cathedral of the Assumption
- Spanish: Catedral de la Asunción
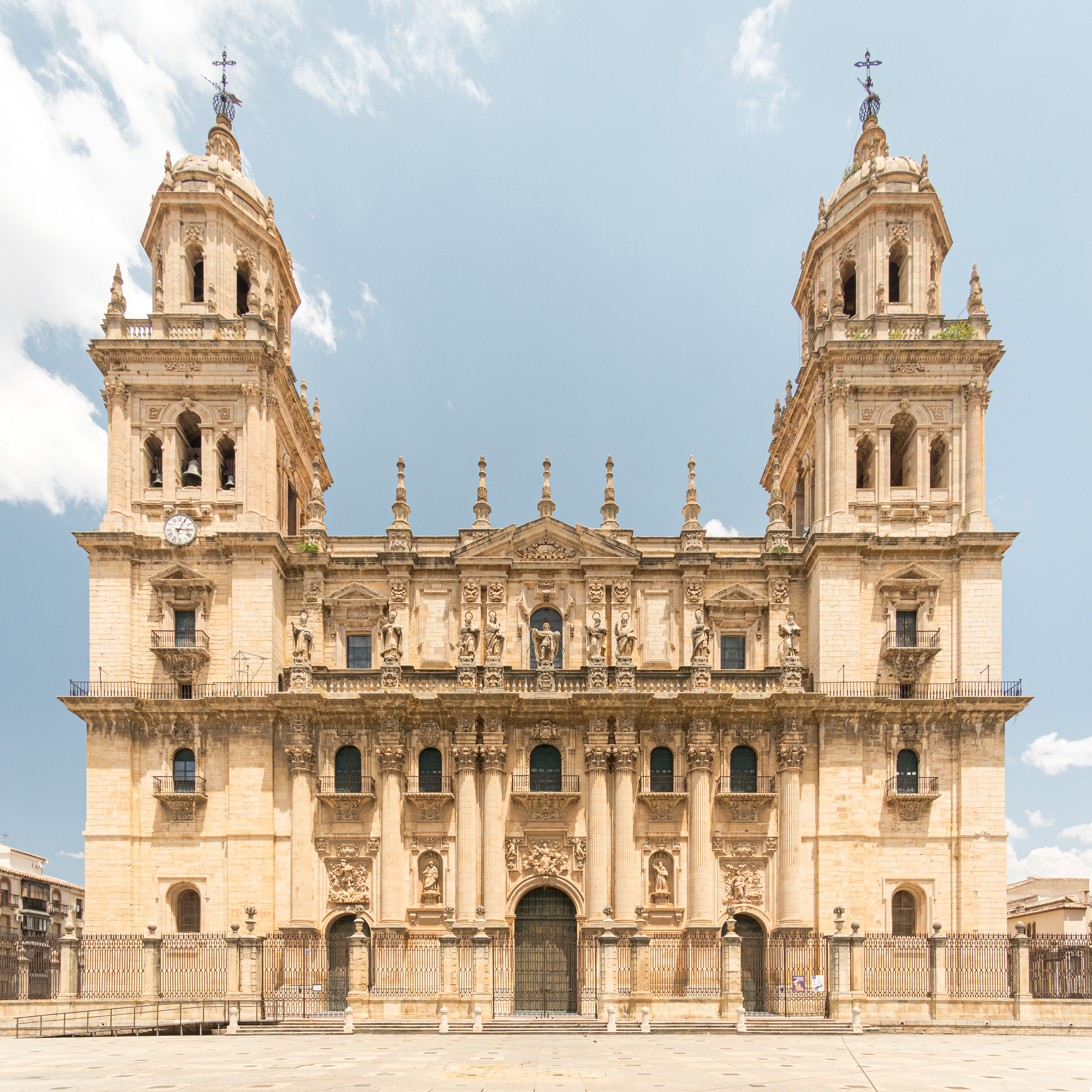
- West façade
- Jaén Cathedral
- 37.765°N 3.7899°W
- Location: Jaén
- Address: Plaza Santa María
- Country: Spain
- Denomination: Catholic
- Website: catedraldejaen.org

History
- Status: Cathedral
- Dedication: Assumption of Mary
- Dedicated: 1660

Architecture
- Architect: Andrés de Vandelvira
- Style: Renaissance, Baroque, Neoclassical
- Years built: 1551–1801

Administration
- Metropolis: Granada
- Diocese: Jaén

Clergy
- Bishop: Sebastián Chico Martínez

Spanish Cultural Heritage
- Type: Non-movable
- Criteria: Monument
- Designated: 3 June 1931
- Reference no.: RI-51-0000645

The Cathedral of the Assumption (Spanish: Catedral de la Asunción) is a Roman Catholic cathedral located in the city of Jaén, Spain.

The current cathedral was conceived in the 16th century to replace a previous 15th century Gothic edifice. Construction lasted for several centuries, with the original idea maintained. Of significance are the chapter house and sacristy, masterpieces of Andrés de Vandelvira and important examples of the Spanish Renaissance; the façade, built in the Baroque style with sculptures by Pedro Roldán; and the choir, built in the Neoclassical style and known as one of the largest in Spain.

Kept in the cathedral is a copy of the Veil of Veronica which probably dates from the 14th century, and originated in Siena. Acquired by Bishop Nicolás de Biedma, it is publicly displayed to the people every year on Good Friday and the Feast of the Assumption, as well as in a side chapel every Friday.

== History ==
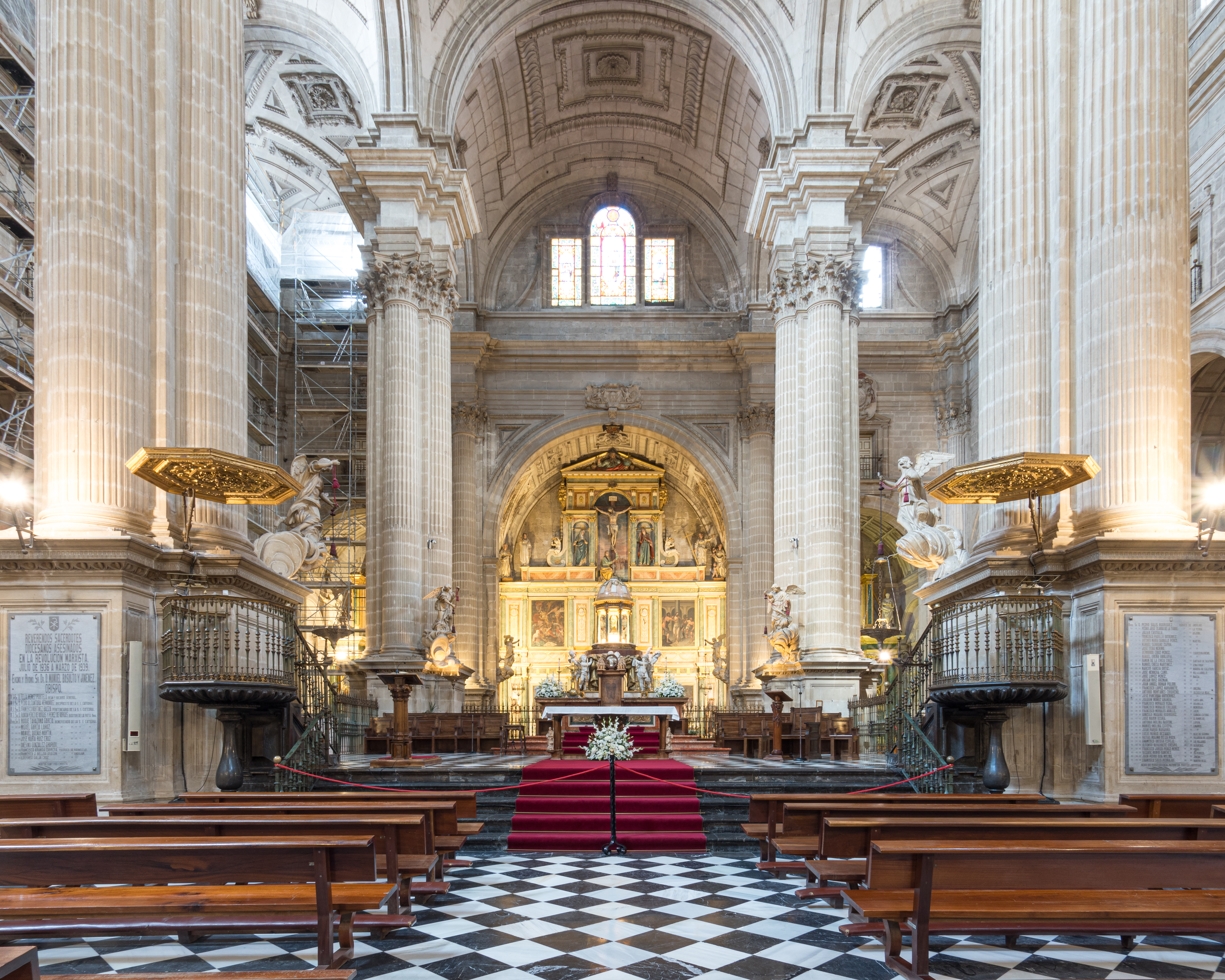
Main Altar.

The site was once occupied by a mosque. This was the central mosque of the city. The current gradual ascent to the building seen today is described and other features of the ancient mosque in the medieval geographical book ‘Rawdul Mu’taar.’The mosque was built, as recorded in the monumental work of world history ‘Al-Kamil’ by Ibn Al-Athir in the year 210 Hijri corresponding to the year Gregorian year 825 A.D. Interestingly, the concluding words of the last Friday sermon in the mosque are noted in ‘Rawdul Mu’taar’ before the handover of the city to the Christians. reconsecrated as a church dedicated to the Assumption after Ferdinand III of Castile took Jaén in 1246. It was damaged and rebuilt on numerous occasions since until the 16th century, when the current edifice began construction.

Several architects were involved in building the cathedral, Andrés de Vandelvira being the most important one. The distinctive façade, designed by Eufrasio López de Rojas, only began construction in 1660, after the cathedral itself was already consecrated; further works involving interior decoration and the chapels would only conclude in 1724. In addition, consolidation works were necessary to the north façade after the Lisbon earthquake of 1755, which also led to the construction of the Sagrario there.

The young Francisco Guerrero was the maestro de capilla of Jaén Cathedral around 1545.

In 2008, the procedure for the cathedral of Jaén to be declared a World Heritage Site, considering that it served as a model for the construction of other cathedrals in Spain and the Americas. On 27 January 2012 the «Jaén Cathedral (extension of the Renaissance monumental complex of Úbeda and Baeza)» was inscribed on the Spanish Indicative List of World Heritage Sites, in the category of cultural property (No. ref 5667).

== Church of the Sagrario ==
The Church of the Sagrario (Spanish: Iglesia del Sagrario) is a building attached to the north facade of the cathedral, made due to the unevenness and damage caused by the Lisbon earthquake of 1755. The project for this work was designed by the Madrid architect Ventura Rodríguez in 1764 and executed by his nephew Manuel Martín Rodríguez. It was consecrated on 22 March 1801.

== Gallery ==
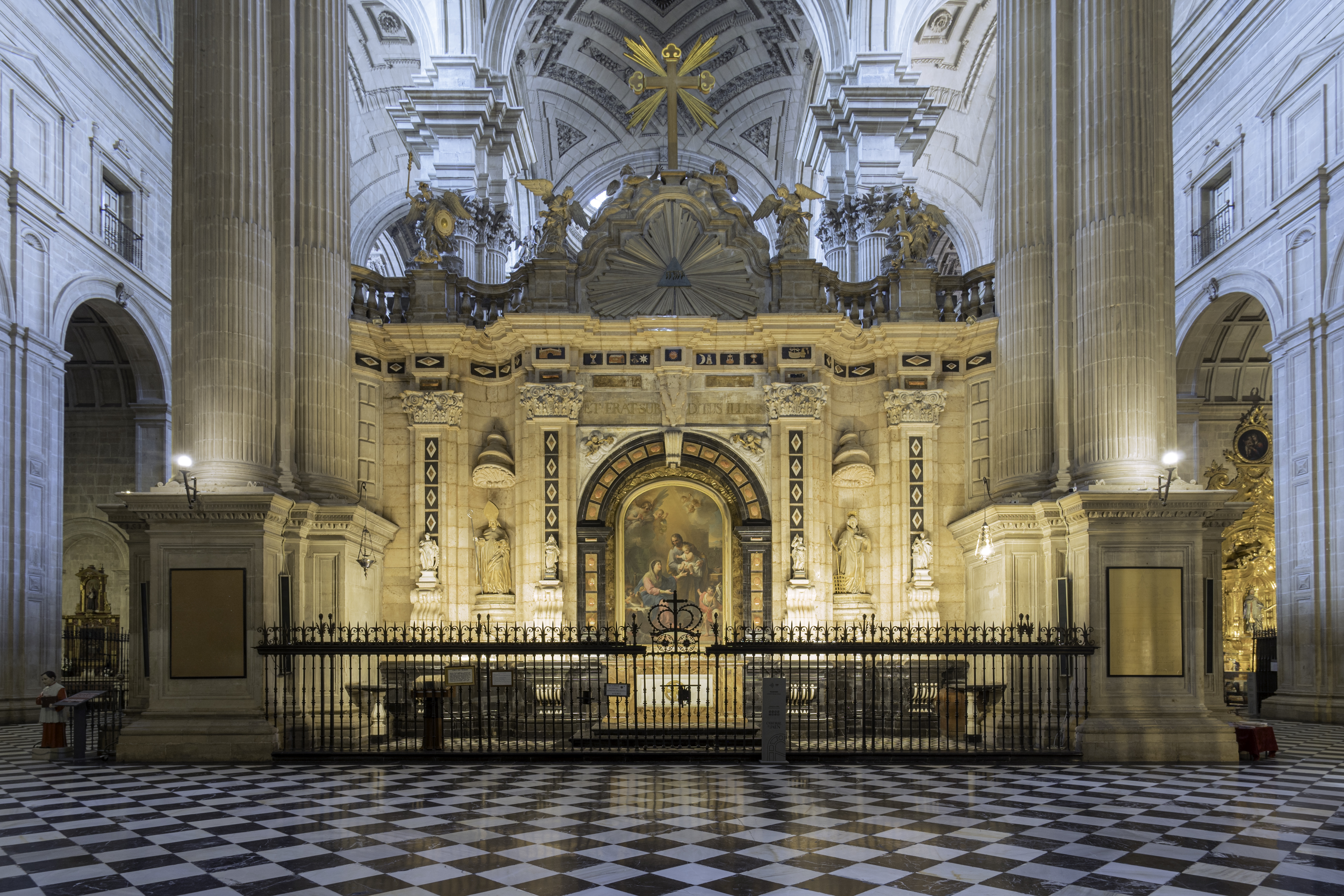
Retrochoir.

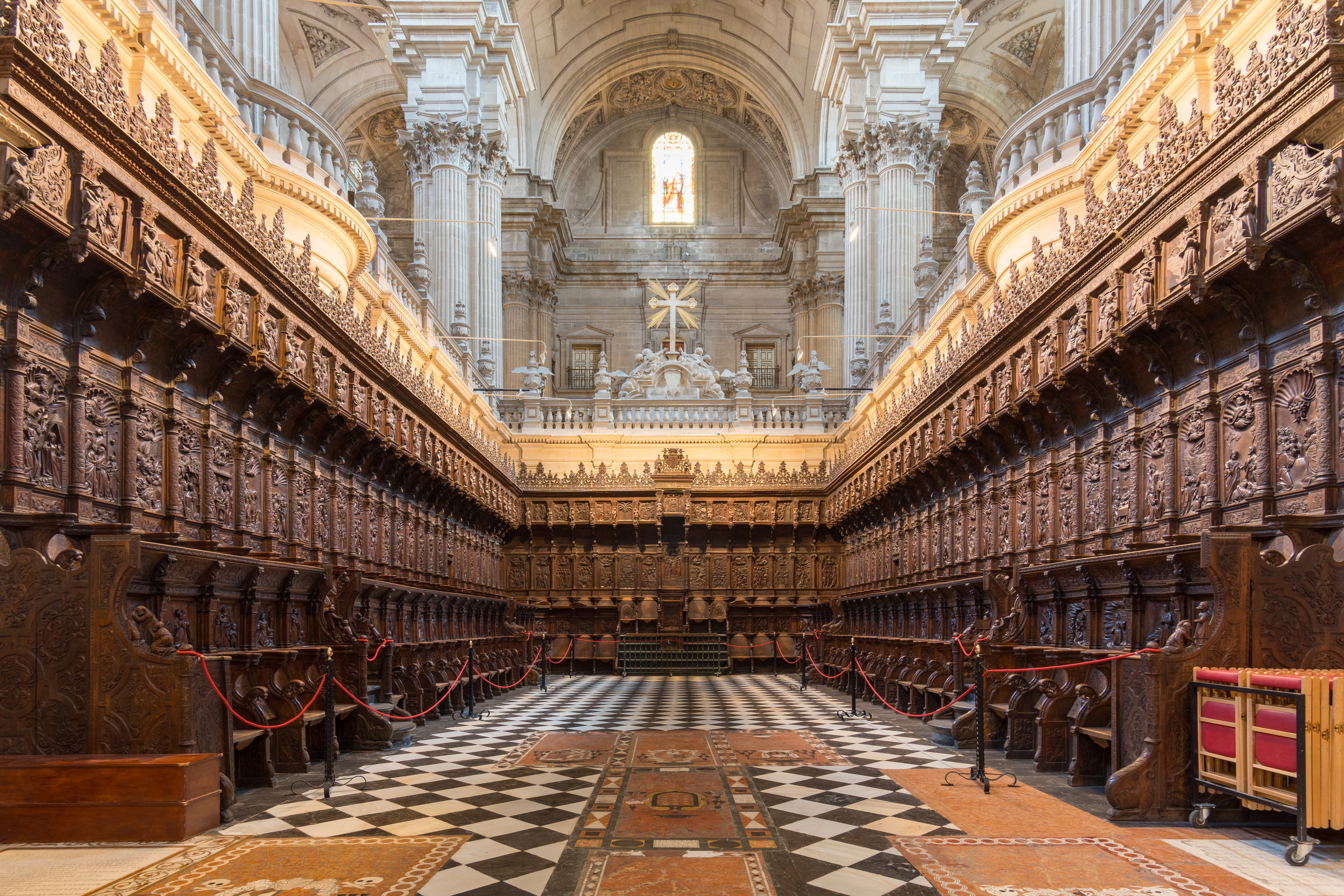
Choir.

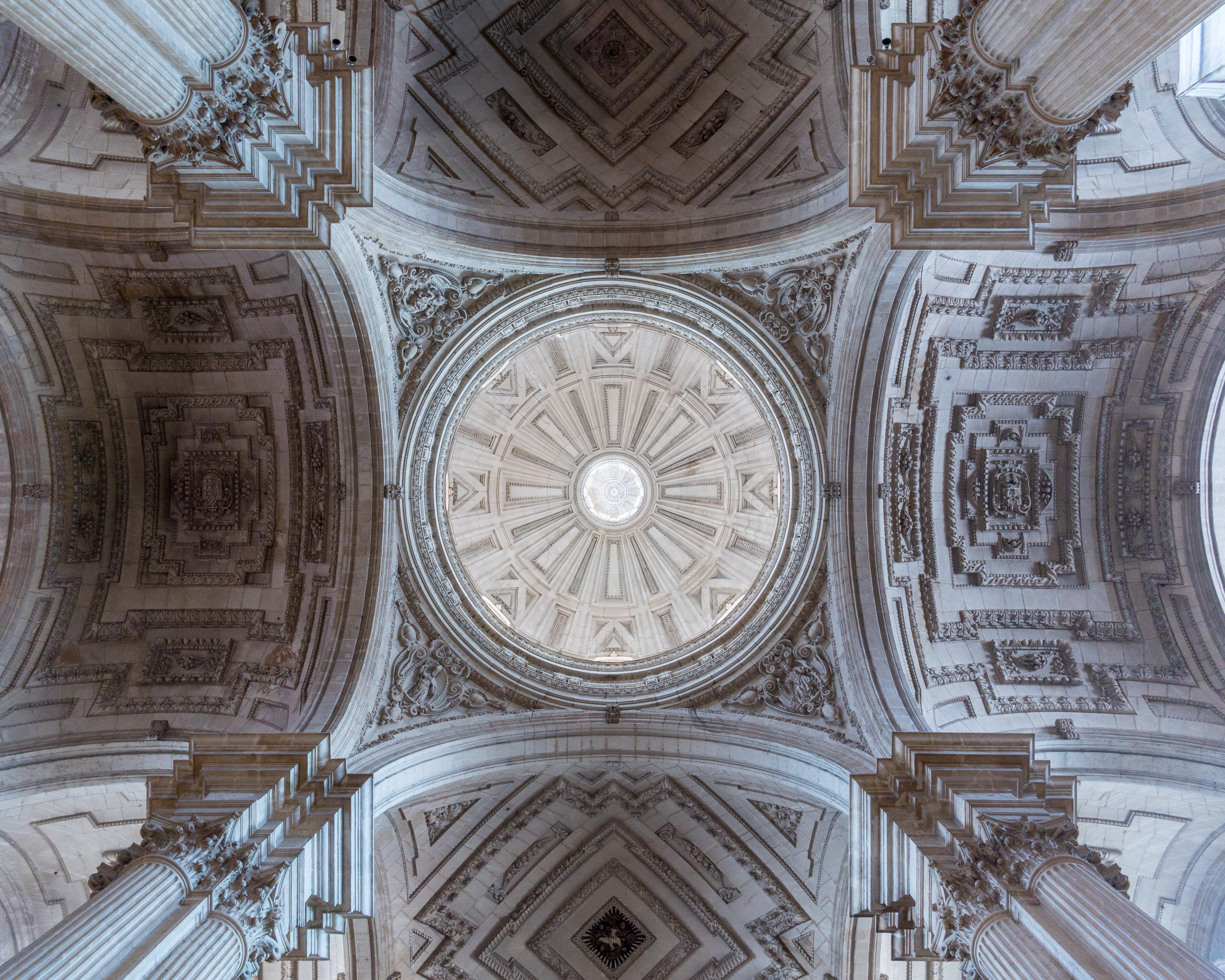
Lantern.

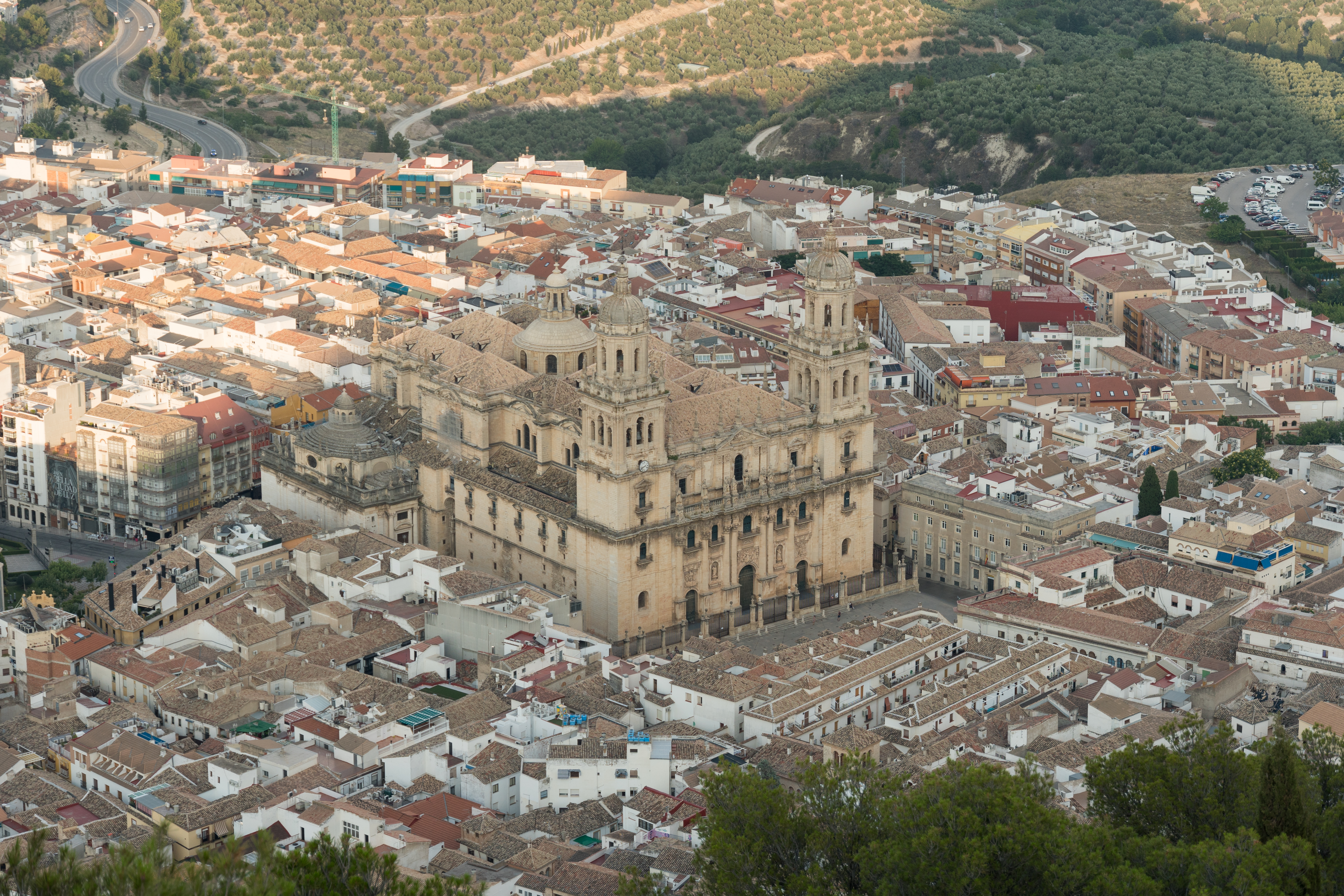
View from the castle.

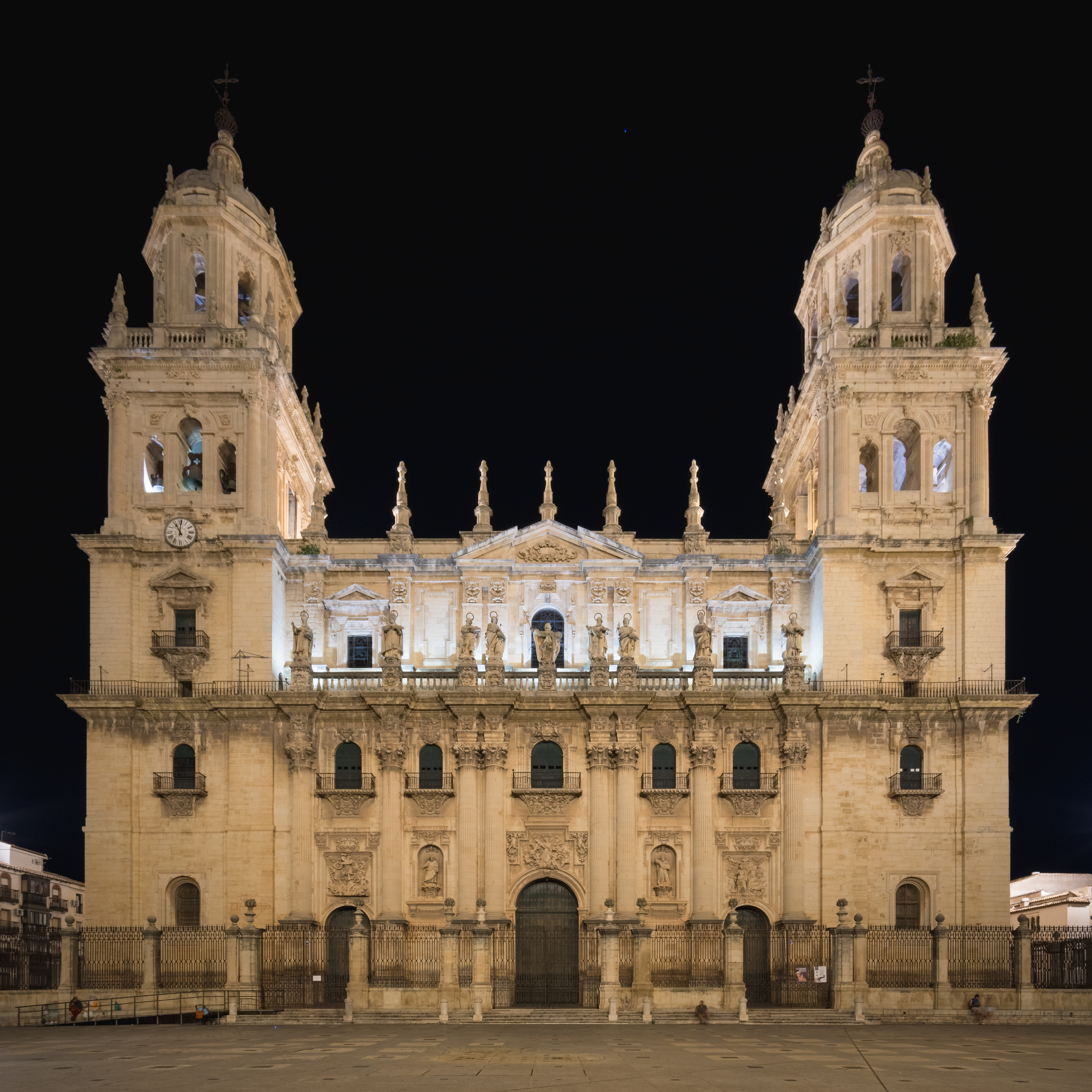
Main façade at night.

== Bibliography ==
- Álamo Berzosa, Guillermo (1968). "Iglesia Catedral de Jaén, Historia e imagen". Jaén, Obispado de Jaén. OCLC 16931353.
- Galera Andreu, Pedro Antonio (1979). La fachada de la Catedral de Jaén y la consolidación de la "arquitectura efímera". Vol. 1. Estudios sobre la literatura y arte: dedicados al profesor Emilio Orozco Díaz. pp. 523–531. ISBN 84-338-0123-6.
- Beltrán Almazán, Cristóbal (1988). "El Cabildo de la iglesia catedral de Jaén en el siglo XVI. Organización y funcionamiento". Boletín del Instituto de Estudios Giennenses. 134: 31–58. ISSN 0561-3590.
- Jiménez Cavallé, Pedro (1993). "La oposición al magisterio de la capilla de la Catedral de Jaén en 1711". Boletín del Instituto de Estudios Giennenses. 147 (147). Boletín del Instituto de Estudios Giennenses: 235–253. ISSN 0561-3590.
- Herrador, Rosario Anguita (December 1994). Universidad de Jaén y Real Sociedad Económica de Amigos del País (ed.). El Arte Eucarístico: ¿un controvertido tema en el Jaén ilustrado?. Actas I Congreso 'La Ilustración y Jaén'. pp. 119–128. Archived from the original on 19 February 2012. "(...) sagrarios y manifestadores hechos ahora en mármol, jaspe y bronce, siguiendo las recomendaciones oficiales, o en madera policromada en verde, rojo o blanco, imitando los materiales anteriores. Se pueden citer aquí los manifestadores de mármol y bronce situados en los presbiterios de la parroquia del Sagrario o de la Catedral de Jaén, y sus correspondientes sagrarios."
- Quesada Galacho, Manuel; Anta Félez, José Luis (1996). "Los exvotos en el Cristo de la Misericordia de la Catedral de Jaén". Boletín del Instituto de Estudios Giennenses. 159: 161–177. ISSN 0561-3590.
- Navascués Palacio, Pedro; Sarthou Carreres, Carlos (1997). Catedrales de España. Madrid: Espasa Calpe. ISBN 84-239-7645-9. OCLC 249825366.
- Domínguez Cubero, José (1998). "Gutierre Gierero, author del Cristo de las Misericordias de la Catedral de Jaén". Boletín del Instituto de Estudios Giennenses. 168: 43–56. ISSN 0561-3590. "Gutierre Gierero realizó el Cristo de las Misericordias de la catedral de Jaén."
- Lara López, Emilio Luis (1999). "El friso gótico de la Catedral de Jaén: Una alegoría de la Resurrección". Boletín del Instituto de Estudios Giennenses. 172 (2). Boletín del Instituto de Estudios Giennenses: 949–977. 0561-3590.
- Galera Andreu, Pedro Antonio (2000). "La Catedral de Jaén". Úbeda (Jaén), El Olivo. OCLC 47182405.
- Arco Moya, Juan del (2000). "Inventario de las actas del cabildo de la catedral de Jaén en el archivo histórico diocesano". Boletín del Instituto de Estudios Giennenses. 175: 109–144. ISSN 0561-3590.
- Barrio Moya, José Luis (2001). "Las donaciones del obispo Don Agustín Rubín de Ceballos a la Catedral de Jaén". Boletín del Instituto de Estudios Giennenses. 179. Boletín del Instituto de Estudios Giennenses: 59–67. ISSN 0561-3590. "El obispo don Agustín Rubín de Ceballos gobernó la diócesis de Jaén desde 1780 hasta 1793. Durante aquel tiempo el generoso prelado contribuyó enormemente al embellecimiento de su sede metropolitana, costeando obras tan estimables como el retablo de San Eufrasio y el Tabernáculo del altar mayor. El hallazgo del testamento de don Agustín Rubín de Ceballos nos permite conocer que, asimismo, legó a la catedral de Jaén no sólo su biblioteca, sino también un valioso misal mozárabe toledano"
- Melgares Raya, José (2003). "Archivo Capitular de la Catedral de Jaén". Boletín del Instituto de Estudios Giennenses. 183. Boletín del Instituto de Estudios Giennenses: 495–510. ISSN 0561-3590. "Existe en el Archivo Histórico Diocesano de Jaén una Sección, de singular interés, por su antigüedad, (siglo XIII) y por la importancia de su valiosa documentación. A este Archivo Capitular, entre otros documentos, pertenecen las Bulas y demás Documentos Pontificios, desde 1368; las Cartas y Privilegios Reales, desde 1525; Constituciones Capitulares y Sinodales, desde 1478; Libros Corales y Misales, a partir del siglo xv; Expedientes de Limpieza de Sangre, desde 1557 y Archivo de Música, desde Palestrina (1515-1594). Con el presente estudio hemos querido ofrecer una descripción detallada pero sucinta de la rica documentación de este Archivo."
- Capel Margarito, Manuel (2004). "Un cuadro-documento de la Catedral de Jaén, pintado por Ambrosio de Valois y recuperado en Argentina". Boletín del Instituto de Estudios Giennenses. 189. Boletín del Instituto de Estudios Giennenses: 9–18. ISSN 0561-3590.
- Diario Jaén, ed. (2006). "Las joyas de la catedral". La catedral de Jaén. 1: 96. OCLC 433510473. "La catedral de Jaén está considerada la muestra más armónica del Renacimiento andaluz, hasta el punto que constituyó una auténtica referencia para las catedrales construidas en América en years posteriores. El templo, declarado Monumento Histórico-Artístico por Decreto de 3 de junio de 1931, se concibió como santuario del Santo Rostro está dedicado a la Asunción de Nuestra Señora. A pesar de ser el resultado de un largo proceso constructivo de tres siglos que abarca diversas obras y estilos, la catedral presenta una insólita unidad estilística, habida cuenta de los variados arquitectos que participaron en su construcción, de los diferentes prelados que marcaron su rumbo y de los gustos atísticos que se sucedieron a lo largo del tiempo."
- Galera Andreu, Pedro Antonio (2006). Las catedrales de Vandelvira. Úbeda (Jaén), El Olivo. ISBN 9788496307438. OCLC 309400836.
- Higueras Maldonado, Juan (2006). "La Catedral de Jaén: Finanzas para su construcción, durante el siglo XVII". Elucidario (1). Elucidario: Seminario bio-bibliográfico Manuel Caballero Venzalá: 113–134. ISSN 1885-9658. "datos referidos a la finanzas para construir la catedral giennense, durante el siglo XVII."
- Ulierte Vázquez, María Luz de (2007). "Capillas y retablos en la catedral de Jaén". Elucidario. 3. Elucidario: Seminario bio-bibliográfico Manuel Caballero Venzalá: 189–208. ISSN 1885-9658.
- Lara López, Emilio Luis (2009). El friso gótico de la catedral de Jaén: una demonización de los judíos a través de la iconografía. pp. 21–43. ISSN 1885-9658.
