= New Cathedral of Cuenca =

Church building in Cuenca, Ecuador

Cathedral of the Immaculate Conception Catedral de la Inmaculada Concepción (in Spanish)
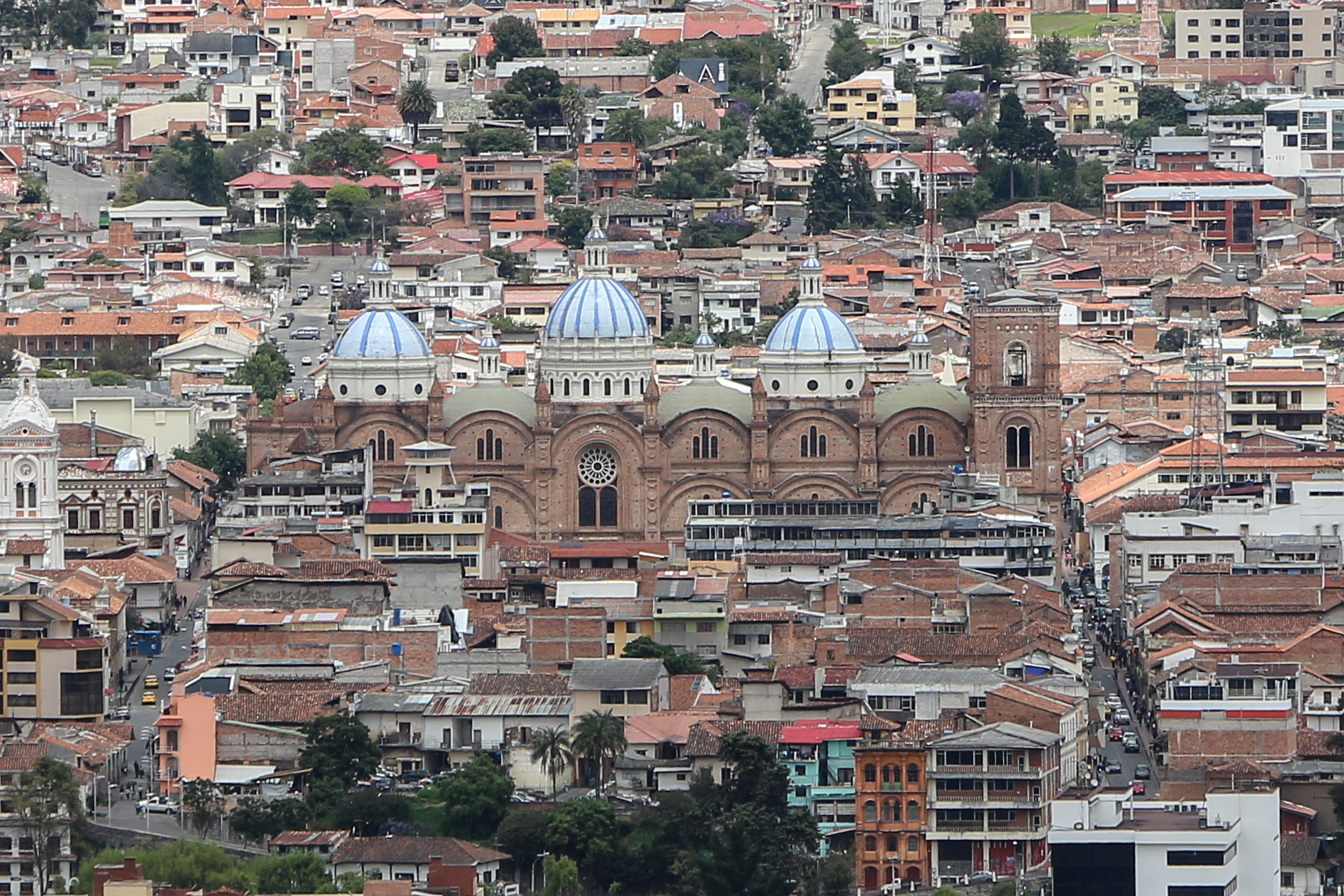

Religion
- Affiliation: Catholic Church
- Rite: Roman Rite

Location
- Location: Cuenca, Ecuador
- Interactive map of Cathedral of the Immaculate Conception; Catedral de la Inmaculada Concepción (in Spanish)
- Coordinates: 2°53′51″S 79°00′18″W

Architecture
- Architect: Juan Bautista Stiehle
- Type: Church
- Style: Romanesque Revival, Neo-Gothic, Baroque Revival, Byzantine Revival
- Groundbreaking: 1885
- Completed: 1975
- Direction of façade: East

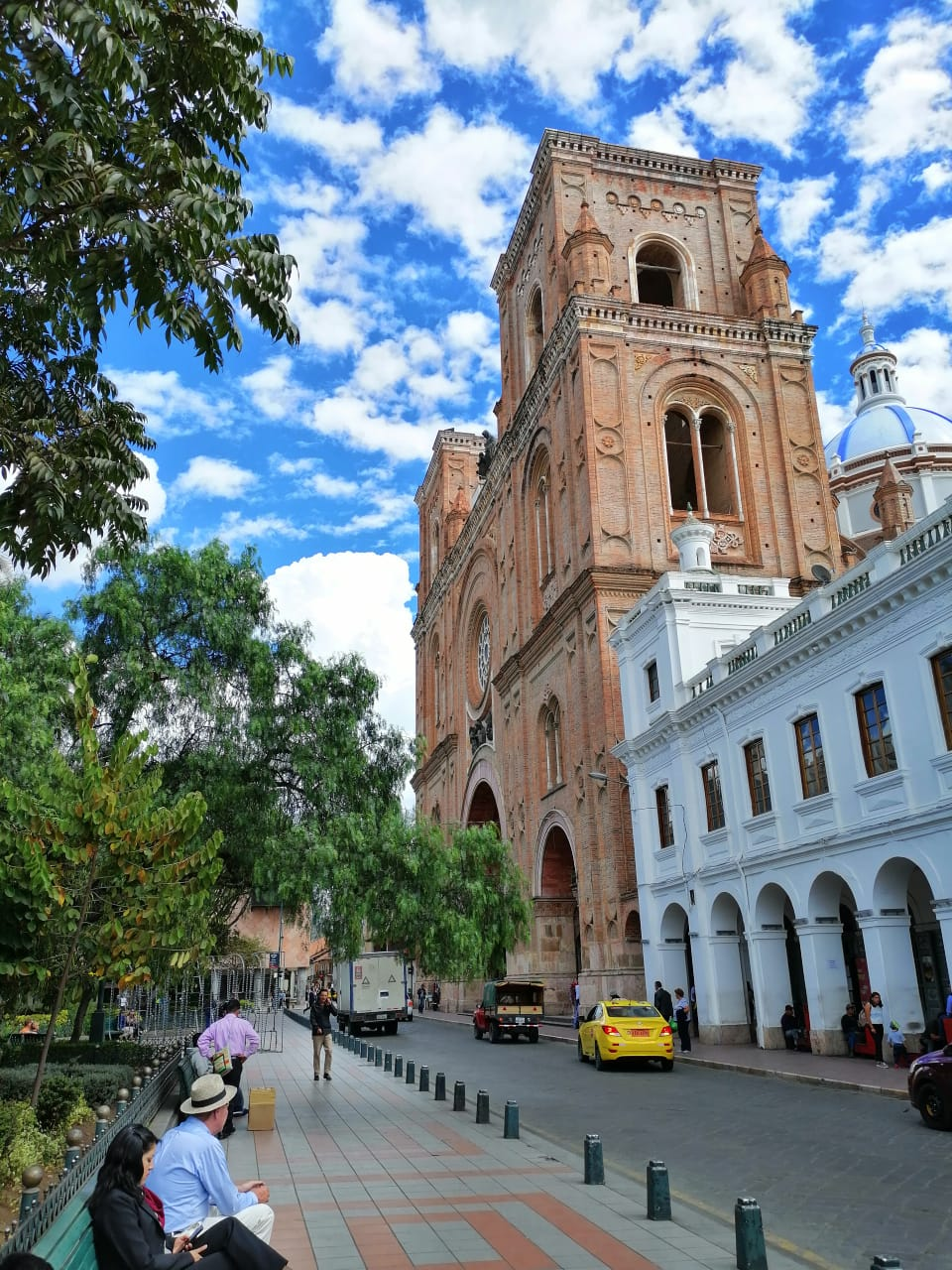
Front view of the Cathedral

The Cathedral of the Immaculate Conception (Spanish: Catedral de la Inmaculada Concepción), commonly referred to as the New Cathedral of Cuenca (Spanish: Nueva Catedral de Cuenca), is the cathedral church in Cuenca, Ecuador. It is situated in front of Parque Calderon.

The plan of the cathedral was drawn up by Juan Bautista Stiehle (1829-1899) — a German-born friar who arrived in Cuenca from Alsace in 1873 — on suggestions made by Bishop León Garrido. The Cathedral took over the function of the nearby Old Cathedral that had become too small. Construction works started in 1885 and lasted for almost a century. This building combines many architecture styles, but Romanesque Revival is predominant. The cathedral is surmounted by three giant domes covered by striking blue and white glazed tile from Czechoslovakia. Its stained glass windows were created by Spanish artist Guillermo Larrazábal.

Its towers are truncated due to a calculation error of the architect. If they had been raised to their planned height, the foundation of this Church to the Immaculate Conception, would not have been able to bear the weight. In spite of the architect's immense mistake, the skyline of its domes has become a symbol for the city. Its facade is made of alabaster and local marble, while the floor is covered with pink marble, brought from Carrara (Italy). When the cathedral was first constructed 9,000 out of Cuenca's 10,000 inhabitants could fit in the building.

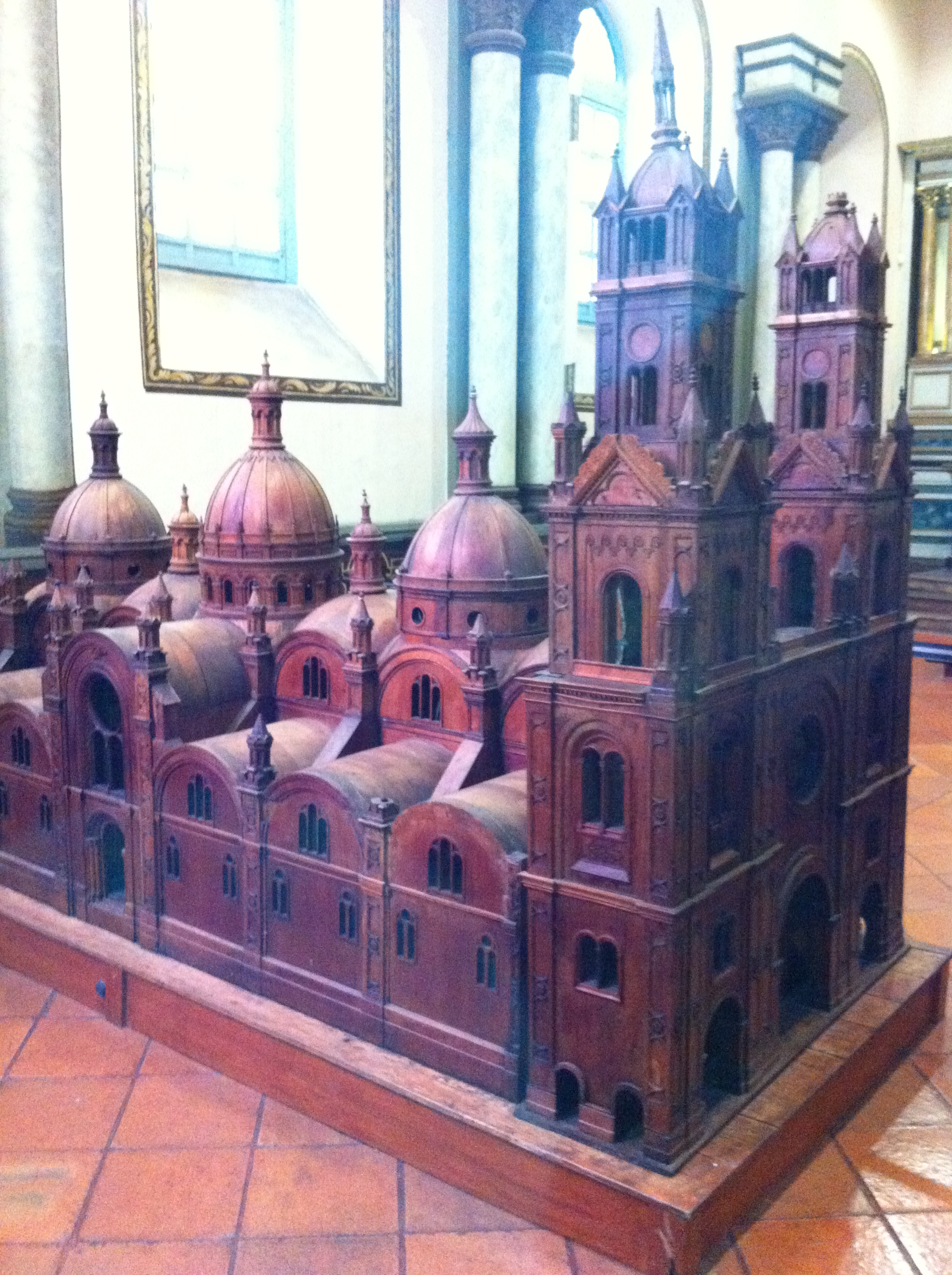
Wooden model of the New Cathedral

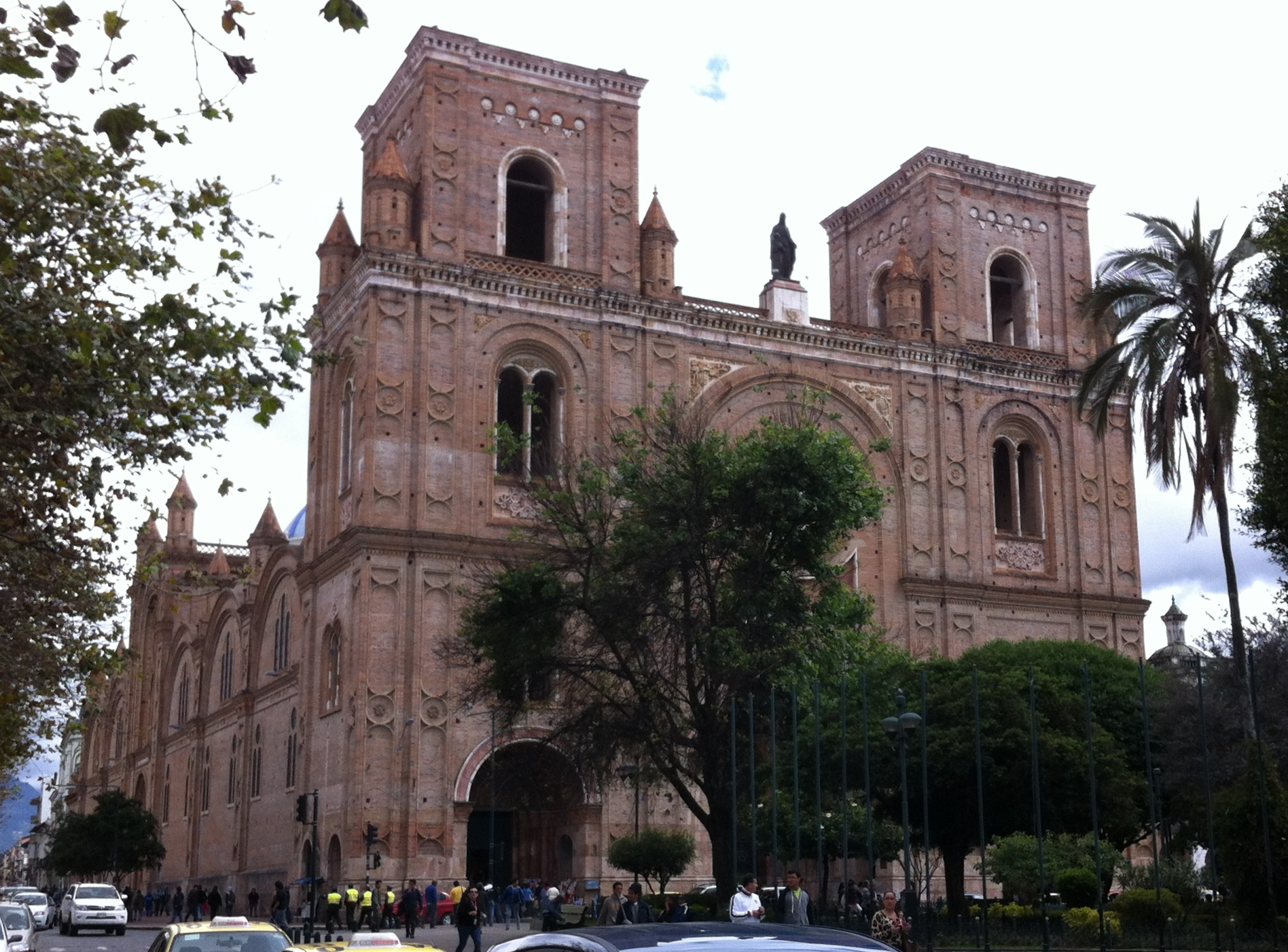
Facade of the New Cathedral

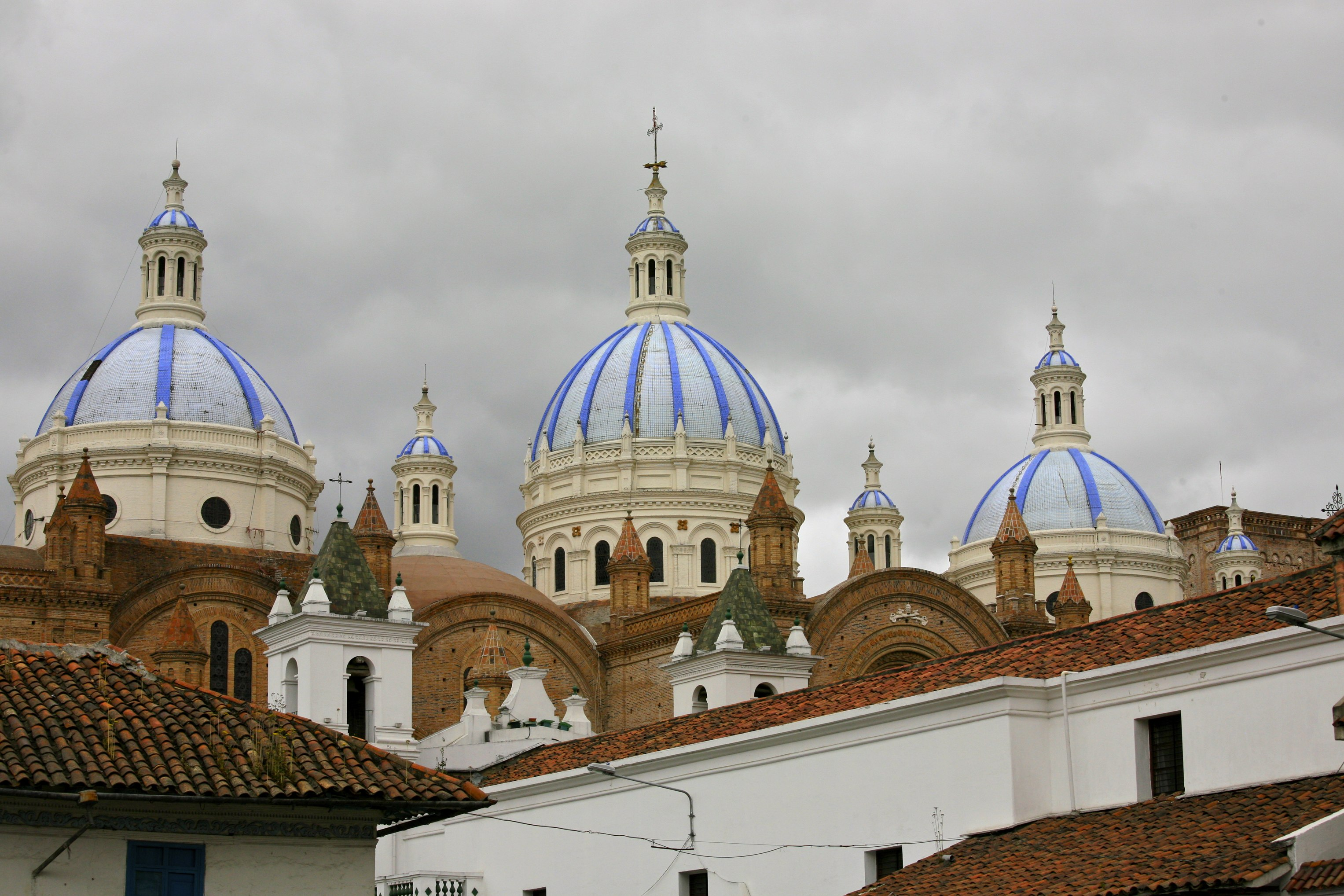
Domes of the New Cathedral

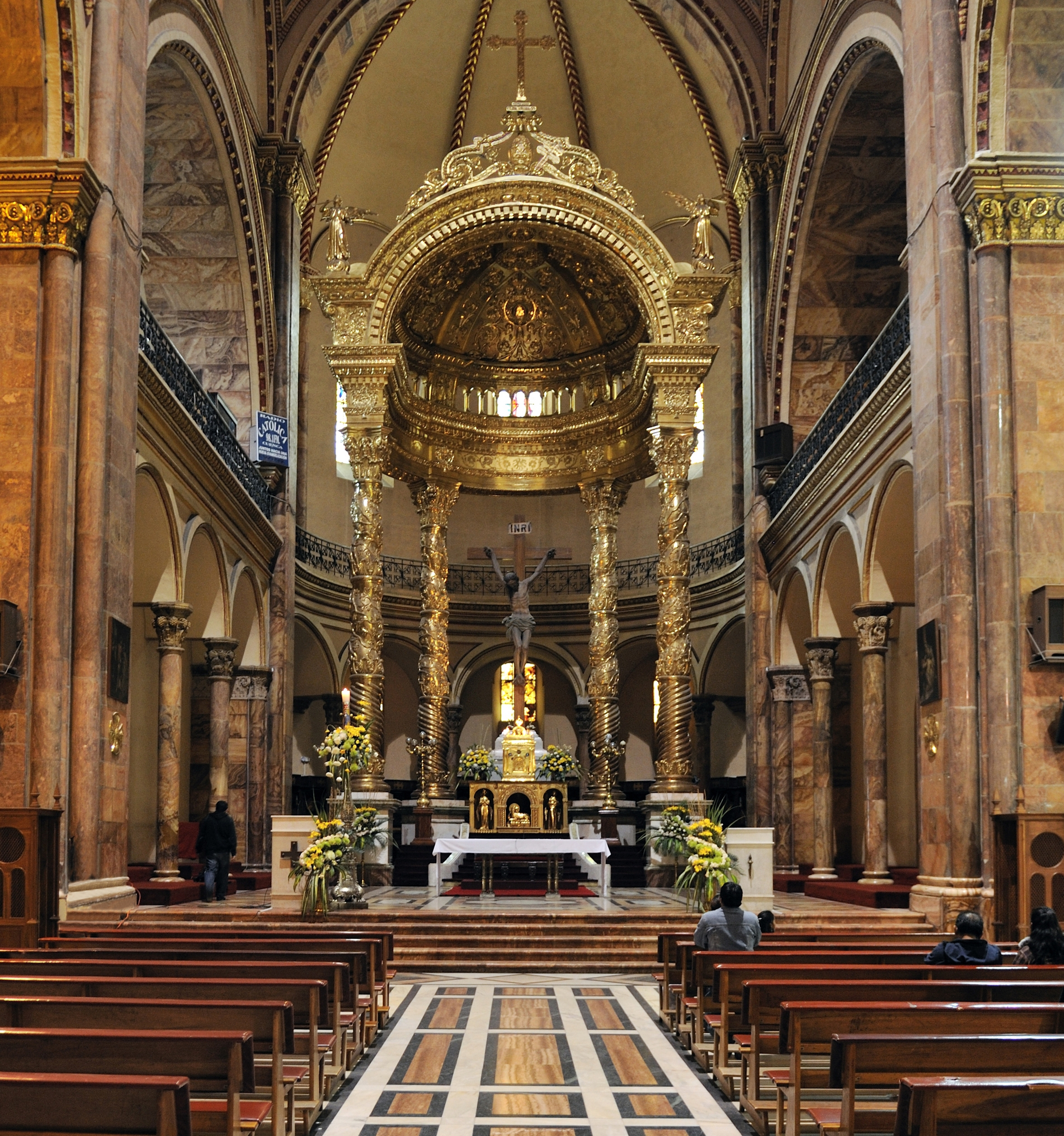
The High Altar

== History ==
=== Church "El Sagrario" or Old Cathedral ===
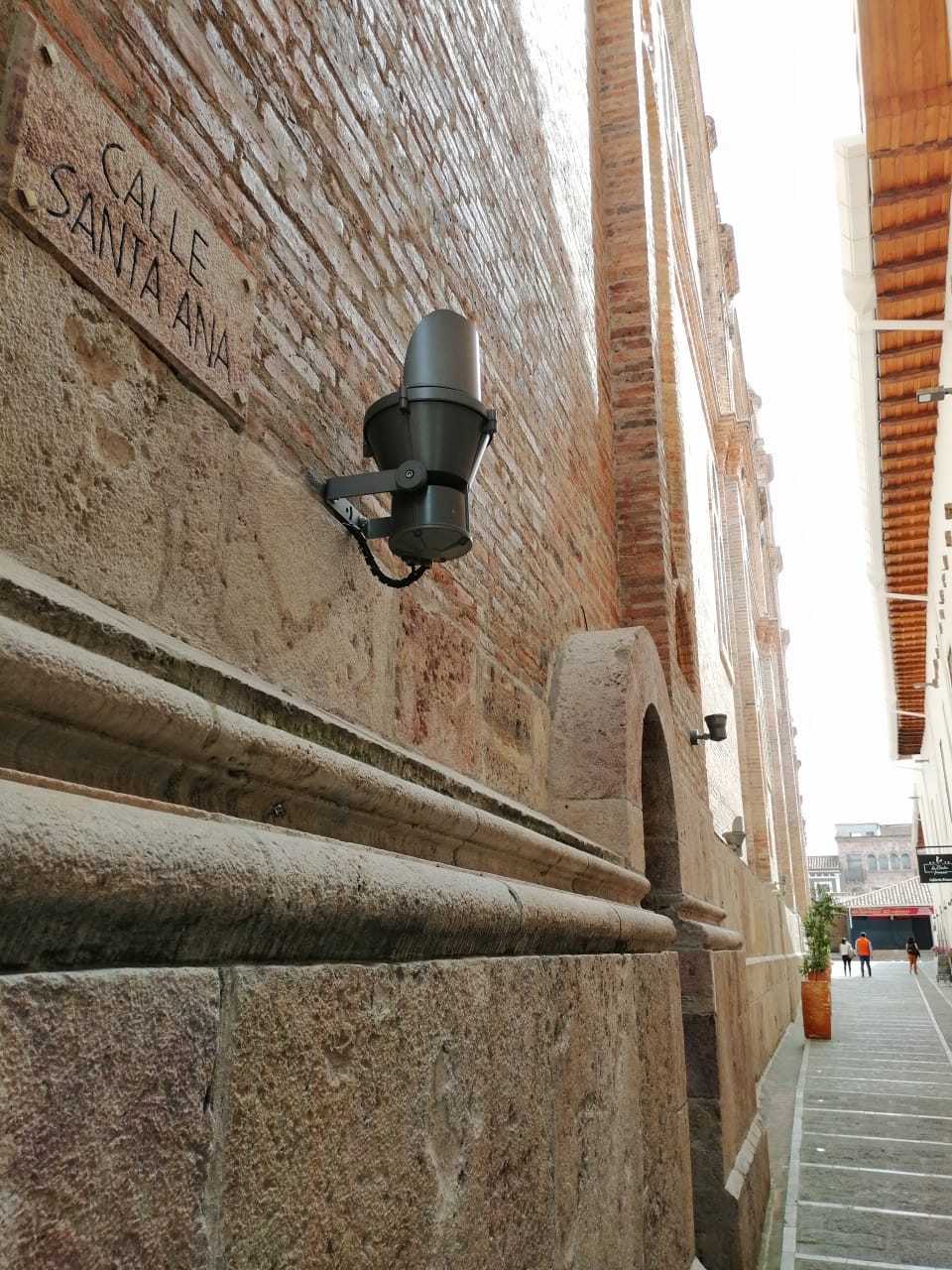
Street Santa Ana

This church is an antecedent for the later construction of the Cathedral of the Immaculate Conception of Cuenca. The Colonel Gil Ramírez Dávalos founded the city of Santa Ana de los Ríos de Cuenca on April 12, 1557, under the orders of Viceroy Andrés Hurtado de Mendoza. In the year 1565 the final location of this church is decided, in which today it is the Historical Center of the city. The development of this project was promoted with the financial support of the Viceroy. The materials used in its construction are simple and easily accessible, such as: stones and sand bordering the city, wood, brick and the warmth of the first ovens of the Spanish Crown. The cathedral counted on several transformations and remissions through time; in 1935 the last work was done on the tower and on the front facade.

The erection of the bishopric of Cuenca was consolidated on April 2, 1786.

In the year 1779, the Royal Certificate was issued by Carlos III, where the separation and creation of the Bishopric in Cuenca was established, which entailed the creation of a temple as a Cathedral. However, a project for the construction of the cathedral, due to the existence of the "El Sagrario" church, would not be completed.

=== Project for the creation of the Cathedral of the Immaculate Conception of Cuenca ===
Remigio Estévez de Toral was selected as the Bishop of Cuenca in the year 1860, during his time as bishop there were several problems surrounding the use of the same church as a parish church and as a cathedral. One of the solutions was to change the parish seat to the church of the company. Due to these problems, the creation of the cathedral was decided. On March 9, 1872, Bishop Estévez de Toral and the ecclesiastical council proclaimed the construction of the cathedral.

On December 6, 1872, 40 varas of land were assigned for the creation of the Cathedral between the contemporary streets Mariscal Sucre, Simón Bolívar, Benigno Malo and Padre Aguirre. In 1874 the Bishopric of Cuenca received the communiqué of Pope Pius IX, approving the construction and an allocation of 500 pesos were sent. The first that supported this project was the Redemptorist Fathers, they provided help of Brother Juan Stiehle as project architect. In 1885, Miguel León Garrido was named the new Bishop of Cuenca, due to the death of Estévez de Toral in 1883, and later the definitive beginning of the construction of the Cathedral of the Immaculate Conception of Cuenca.

== Construction of the church ==
The construction of the building took a time of 83 years. Below are the most important events:

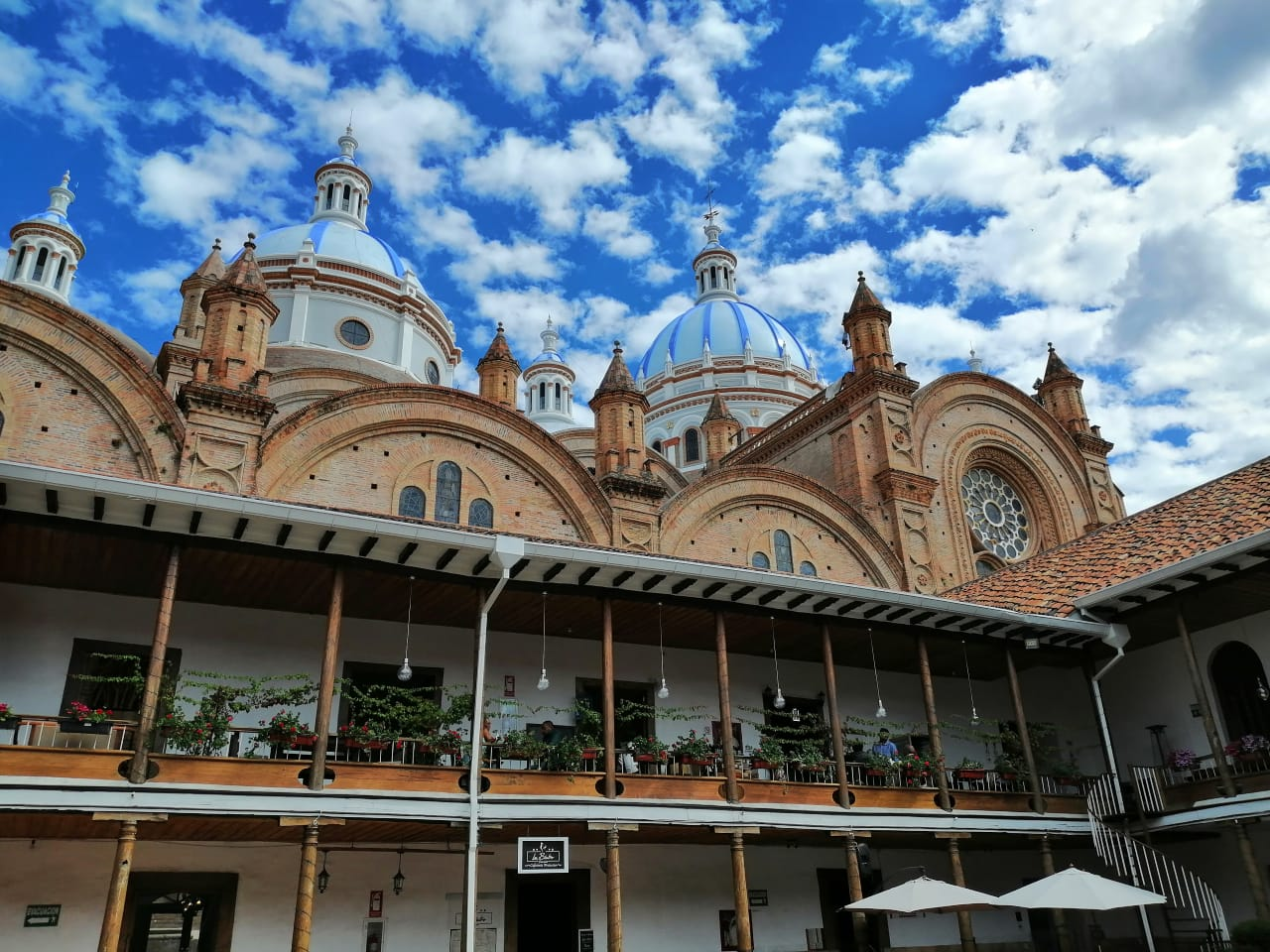
Side view of the Cathedral

=== 1885-1900 ===
Miguel Leon Garrido, who was the ninth Bishop of Cuenca, began construction on October 2, 1885, ordering the opening of the foundations. On October 25 of the same year, the work begins formally with the contribution from all the inhabitants of the city. Brother Juan directed the excavation works for these foundations since that same month, although the definitive plans for the cathedral were not completed.

One of the first parts that were built was the Crypt of the cathedral, for which it was essential to drain the rainwater, deposited in the excavation. Due to the fact that the works in the site were increasing in an accelerated way, Ronualdo Bernal was hired on December 1, 1885, so that he could help Brother Juan in the direction of the work. It was not until a year later, on December 12, 1886, when the first stone of the cathedral was placed.

To obtain more income for the construction, the Cathedral Chapter ordered on February 18, 1887, that 10% of the rent of each canon would be destined for this purpose. In addition, much of the tools and materials needed to continue construction did not exist in Ecuador and had to be imported from Europe. For this reason, on August 15, 1887, Mr. Carlos Ordóñez was assigned to bring several construction components to the city. He used to travel abroad for business purposes.

=== 1901-1918 ===
In 1901 there was a shortage of materials and money, so the construction continued with materials that had been paid in advance and with the collaboration of the people. On June 5, 1903, due to economic problems, the construction of the cathedral was interrupted. Manuel María Pólit would be the bishop of Cuenca from 1908 and tried to advance the construction. Due to the economic reality, Polit presented the idea of a less ambitious model; This plan was presented to the parish priests and members of the Catredalicio Chapter, who preferred the original model.

In the year of 1918, the Archbishop of Quito, Federico González Suárez died and Bishop Polit was elected to replace him, he brought to Quito a report detailing the progress of construction during the ten years he was bishop of the city of Cuenca.

=== 1918-1953 ===
On March 12, 1918, Daniel Agustín Hermida Ortega was named as the new bishop of Cuenca and he would remain in office for 53 years. From 1924 to 1930, the canons, A. Ortega and Muñoz and the procurator Isaac Peña collaborated in the construction. In 1941 began the construction of the atrium of the cathedral with the bricklayer, Pacual Lojano, who died the same year. The construction of the atrium continued at the hands of Luis Antonio Chicaiza in 1942. From 1942 to 1950 the ornamentation of great paste the cathedral was made, but there were problems for the construction of the greater dome that would present a more resistant structure, and later it would be counted on tiles brought from Czechoslovakia.

=== 1954-1967 ===
On November 13, 1954, the first public act took place inside the cathedral that was not finished yet; the episcopal consecration of Manuel Serrano Abad was celebrated. In the same year, the interior part would be completed with the placement of Italian marble on the floor. On September 28, 1956, Bishop Daniel Hermida died and Manuel de Jesús Serrano Abad was appointed as the new bishop. The buildings would continue and in 1964, Luis Antonio Chicaiza died.

Bishop Serrano got in Europe the Christ, made by the Spanish sculptor Rafael Planas, the bronze Tabernacle for the high altar and the statue of Santa Ana. On May 22, 1967, the bronze statue of Santa Ana Patron of Cuenca was placed in the front of the cathedral and six days later the Cathedral of Cuenca is consecrated to the Immaculate Virgin Mary in the 4th National Eucharistic Congress in the presence of the Pontifical Delegate Cardinal Julio Dophër, archbishop of Munich.

=== 1968-1994 ===
The cathedral was used only in special events until November 1, 1970, when the Chapter was definitively transferred to the Chapter Hall of the new cathedral. Archbishop Serrano Abad died on April 21, 1971, after which certain internal works were done to the cathedral. On July 20, 1971, Ernesto Álvarez is named as the new bishop of the city. In 1973, Álvarez was pressured to request funds from the National Government for the culmination of the cathedral towers, since the allocation they received was eliminated in the government of Rodríguez Lara. However, the bishop had opposed because the government had already extended an assignment for the settlement of temples due to the earthquake of 1970.

With the death of the last three canons: Adolfo Polo, Néstor Durán and Miguel Cordero the Ecclesiastical Chapter of Cuenca disappeared, leaving the Cathedral unfinished. Then the architect Gastón Ramírez Salcedo proposes a new project for the construction of the towers; in 1978 it was approved that DITURIS build the north tower with the commitment of the Curia to obtain funds for the construction of the south tower.

Without the expected results, in 1981 Monseñor Alberto Luna Tomar was appointed as the new Archbishop of Cuenca, who would dedicate his work to carry social jobs. The architect Gastón Ramírez, presented in August 1988 a report for the completion of the work, which proposed the total completion for the year 1992.

== Zoning ==
The Zoning is the distribution of the Cathedral spaces by zones:

Access area: Accesses and Lobbies.

Area of worship: Central Nave, Sideships, Choirs and Presbytery.

Complementary area to the cult: Sacristy and Chapterhouse.

Housing area: Stores, Departments of religious: Guardians of the Cathedral and Missionaries.

Burial area: Crypt.

== Description of spaces ==
The Cathedral of Cuenca is the church belonging to the bishop of the city and has spaces that are common in other churches, but also has some that are unique. These are described below.

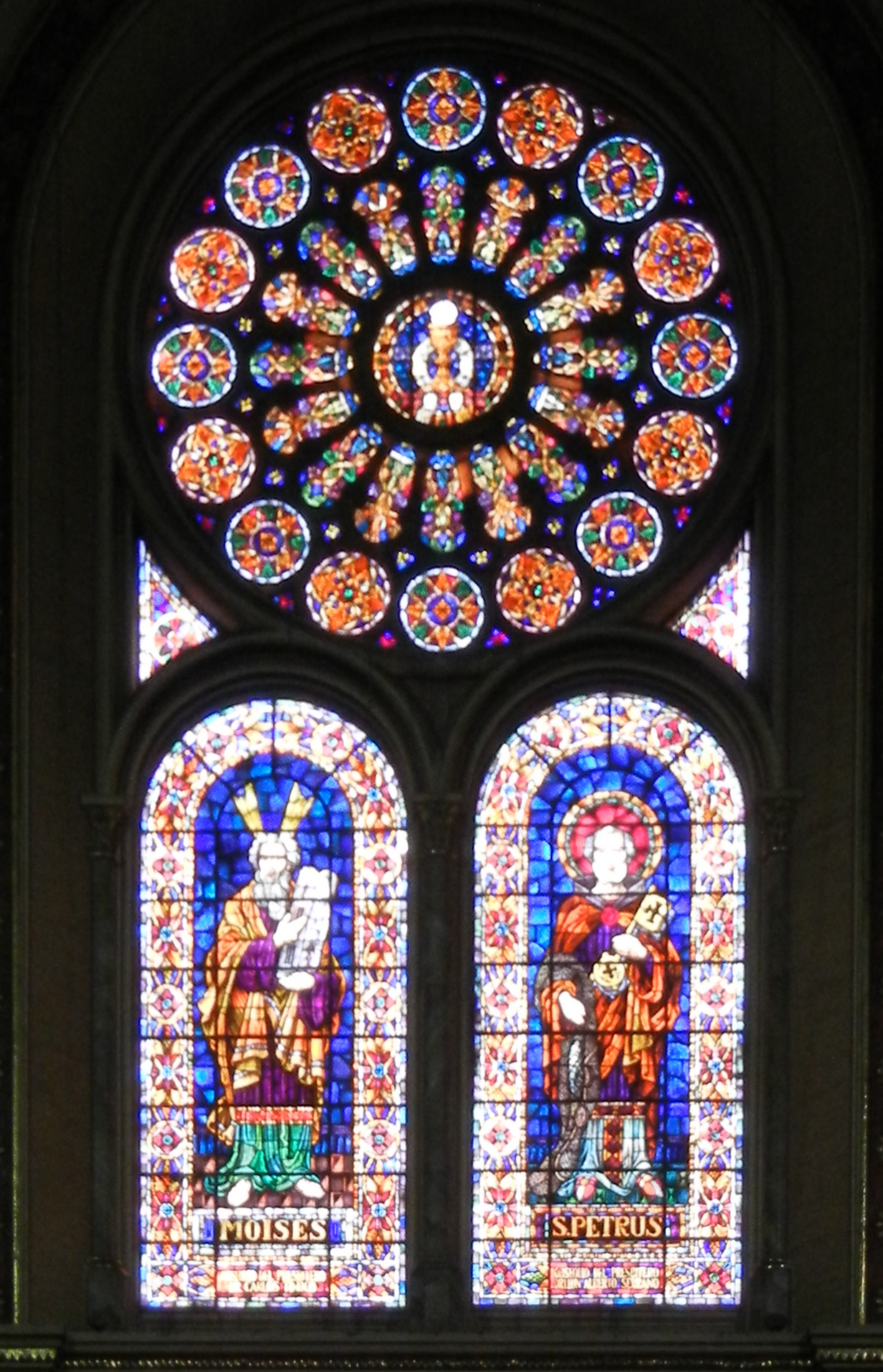

=== Central Warehouse ===
This is the largest space, in which the faithful people gather to participate in different ceremonies. It limits with the Side Ships by the columns of the structure of the building. The latter are arranged equidistantly with each other, and symmetrically with respect to the center. In addition, they are joined by arcs of half a point (which is a characteristic of the Romanesque architecture). It has a virtual limit towards the west with the Presbytery for the difference in level.

Once inside the cathedral, there is a sensation of being diminutive, given the spaciousness of the Central Nave. In addition, the little light that filters through the stained glass windows provides an environment for meditation and reflection.

=== Side Warehouses ===
There are two, which are located symmetrically on the sides of the Central Warehouse. For this reason, they are limited to the exterior by the walls that form the body of the building. In addition, both have similar characteristics; comparing them with the Central Ship they have a lower height, although they maintain the same depth. Its vaults have a cannon style, which are based on columns joined by Roman arches that complement the structure of the building. Between the columns that protrude from the walls, spaces are formed (niches), which house the lateral altars of the church.

The main function of these structures is the free circulation, because there are ceremonies with a high concurrence, these spaces are occupied by the faithfuls, increasing the total capacity of congregation on the cathedral.

=== Side altars ===
There are eleven altars located in the Lateral Ships. They are found in the niches (formed by the columns and walls that divide them), spaces designed for this purpose. These altars respond to the faith of the people of Cuenca, raised to different saints to whom they profess devotion. Each of them have different characteristics:

==== Altar of Santa Marianita ====
Made with marble original from Cuenca, it was designed and built by the Cuenca artisan César Quishpe. It is constituted by regular volumes that are arranged one above the other, forming a pedestal on which the sculpture of the Saint is based. On the pedestal rises a niche crowned by a semicircular arch, which shows an integration of the altar with the architecture of the temple. Every May 26 a mass is celebrated in his honor.

==== Altar of the Santísimo ====
One of the most visited altars of all the cathedral. Here a daily Mass is celebrated and the Christ of the Eucharist is exposed. Built in marble, and forms three volumes of different dimensions that serve as a base. Above these rises an arcade that holds three recessed arches, forming a niche that houses the sculptural set that represents the Holy Trinity. All this set is of colonial origin, passed from the Old Cathedral to the New.

==== Altar of the Lord of Good Hope ====
Along with the Altar of the Most Holy and that of the Dolorosa were the first altars placed in the cathedral before its consecration. In the same way as with the Altar del Santísimo, it was moved from the Old Cathedral to the New one. This altar has a different style from the rest, as it mixes Gothic and Baroque elements (ogival arches, Solomonic columns, curved lines, etc.).

==== Altar of the Dolorosa ====
This is different from the rest of the altars because of its construction in wood, decorated with gold leaf lines. It was made by Quito artisans. It is formed by columns of circular section seated on a pedestal. The picture of the Sorrowful Virgin is in a niche, topped by a frieze. This niche is formed by four columns, joined by arches of half a point, and a shell. This altar is crowned by a kind of bulrush formed by three reduced arches. Every April 20 a mass is celebrated in honor of the Sorrowful Virgin.

==== Altar of Santa Ana ====
It is built in marble; it was designed and elaborated by the Cuenca artisan César Quishpe. Formed by a pedestal of straight volumes, on which a niche covered by arches is located that lodges the sculpture. Here no mass is celebrated, since it is the Patroness of the city, and its mass is performed in the High Altar on July 26 of each.

==== Altar of Hermano Miguel ====
Another altar designed and built in marble by César Quishpe. He was installed in the Cathedral on October 30, 1977, date of beatification of the Santo cuencano. His statue was made in Rome. The altar as such, is formed by two semicircular arches joined with recessed columns, seated on a regular volume that serves as a base. Every February 9 a mass is celebrated in his honor.

=== Sacristy ===
It is the place where priests dress for celebrations, and ornaments, sacred vessels and other objects belonging to the cult are kept. Even in some special celebrations, there are processions that start in this place. It is located on the south side of the High Altar, which is a wide space and divided in the center by a vain in the shape of an arch. It has a flat ceiling and framed with a border, at the junction with the walls.

This space does not have a decoration, like the other spaces where the celebrations of the cult are carried out. Additionally, here the public is served, who daily requests some services from the cathedral.

=== Presbytery ===
It is the space where religious worship ceremonies are held. It's divided in:

High Altar Which contains the Altar of the Tabernacle, the Baldalquino, and the Main Altar.

Choir of the Canons that is in the apse

==== Altar of the Tabernacle ====
Made of wood and covered in gold leaf. It is located on a Carrara marble staircase with Cuenca marble. It contains interior niches, in which are three sculptures of great beauty and simplicity. On this altar sits the bronze tabernacle, brought from Europe. Finally, it is complemented by a somewhat dark colored Christ, made in Spain, and acquired by Monsignor Manuel de Jesus Serrano Abad, in 1963.

==== Baldalquino ====
This is the main element that stands out from the interior of the entire Cathedral. It is made of cedar wood, and carved and bathed entirely with gold leaf. Its shape imitates the canopy of St. Peter's Basilica in Rome. Its construction was entrusted to the Salesians, and it was Father Carlos Crespi who brought Brother Pedro Gazzoli to execute it. Laminated gold plates were purchased in Germany.

On a marble base stand four large salomonic columns, decorated on three levels:

The first level, with a spiral agreement.

The next two, with branches or plant motifs.

All this ends with Corinthian capitals. On these sits a few capitals that are joined by a cornice. Finally, a semicircle is set, decorated by a series of curved lines. This baldachin has an approximate height of twenty meters, crowned by two sculptures of triumphant angels on the sides of the arch and in the center with a cross.

== Complementary space of the cathedral ==
=== Dwelling ===
At the back of the temple, there is a house with a tile roof that surrounds the apse, and is attached to the rest of the building. It has superimposed rows of windows and windows, with a marked horizontality reinforced by cornices and marcapisos. Its facade is topped by a balustrade and a tympanum, characteristic elements of an architecture of Renaissance influence.

In the lower part, there are three stores, in which commercial activities are carried out, independent of the ecclesiastics. These tents are leased, and the funds obtained are used to support the nuns, who do maintenance work at the cathedral, while on the upper part there are two departments, one on each side of the apse. In the North department, religious reside who maintain the temple. In the South Department, sisters reside who dedicate themselves to missionary activities.

=== Cemetery ===
The cemetery of the cathedral is located below the central nave and has three entrances: one through Calle Aguirre, another through the Sacristy and a third is in Mariscal Sucre Street. The shape of this crypt is that of a long alley with funerary vaults on each side.

In the Crypt are buried some of the illustrious figures of the city of Cuenca as: Remigio Crespo Toral, Gral. Antonio Vega, Fray Vicente Solano; as well as the bishops of the city: Miguel León, Manuel María Política, Daniel Hermida, Monsignor Manuel Serrano Abad; and the builder of the cathedral: Luis Antonio Chicaiza.

The Crypt has 11 small mausoleums, 192 vaults and 210 urns for remains.

=== Domes ===
The Cathedral of Cuenca has six domes that are on the pre-ministry and the Central Nave. They are divided into three highs and three lows that are interspersed in their location. all domes have a flashlight inside. The three high domes and one of the low ones are covered by tile while the others maintain the brick structure.

The tall domes have a Renaissance style, the largest is on the Cruiser and has an inner diameter of 12 meters and has a height of 53 meters.

=== Santa Ana Street ===
It is one of the oldest streets in Santa Ana de los Ríos de Cuenca. Apparently it was already contemplated at the moment of the Castilian foundation of the city. The own Gil Ramírez Dávalos, Commissioner of the Marquis of Cañete, Hurtado de Mendoza, made it consign in the text that was described in the interpretation of the primitive plan of our city.

This small street is located in the heart of the city and its Historical Center, between two buildings of great importance: The Cathedral of the Immaculate Conception and the old Seminary called San Luis.

== Building technology ==
=== Construction methods ===
The construction of the cathedral was made based on the original plans, these were designed and drawn by Brother Juan, with small changes that occurred in the building process. The direction of the construction of the cathedral was in charge of priests and executed by Cuenca artisans and the people in general through the mingas. In addition to the detailed technical specifications in the construction plans, popular knowledge is added as an artisan way of building, with a common sense and a logic acquired by experience, skill and expertise of the workers.

The Cathedral used artisan systems typical of the time and place. An example of this is the use of wooden scaffolds joined with ropes to lift the thick and gigantic walls of the building. You can still see holes in the outer walls due to such scaffolding

=== Arches and columns ===
The whole set of arches is based on columns with a cruciform section, that is, with protruding bodies to receive the arches. This applies both to the reinforcing arches adhered to the vaults, as well as to those resting on the domes.

The arcs have a highlight in their profile. In the columns, to receive these arcs, we also generated ridges at the vertices. Additionally, in each vertex there are smaller columns of circular section that culminate in the capital.

=== Foundation (engineering) ===
The foundation is of river stone masonry, with lime and sand mortar. The depth of the foundations and columns of the buildings of the building is about seven meters, by the level of the floor of the Crypt. In the Towers, the foundations reach a depth of four meters. This was proved in May 1972, by the excavation carried out by Architect Ramírez, when the terrain was tested.

=== Walls ===
Due to the unevenness of the land on which the cathedral was based, there is a base on the foundations of the same, in order to equalize the foundations of the building. This plinth was built with a carved marble masonry, which ends with a bevel to adhere to the wall. Thus, the great walls of the cathedral are made with a masonry filling of river stone, with lime mortar and sand. These are covered with brick walls, also with a lime and sand mortar.

The thickness of the walls varies, since the widest ones have four meters (towers), followed by the ones of 1.40 meters (outer walls of the naves), and finally the narrowest of one meter (outside of the house)

=== Domes ===
There are two types of domes:

Low: constituted by spherical shells, seated directly on the arches.

Tall: linked or seated on the arches by means of four spherical triangles (called pendentives). On these pendentives sits a ring, from which a cylinder is generated (called drum) that is crowned by a vault banked. At the top of the dome, there is the Lantern, of Renaissance architectural design.

=== Materials ===
The construction has a variety of materials. Most are typical of the mountain region and the city. Other materials were brought from Europe. Below is a survey of the elements with their respective materials:

Foundations: stone masonry with lime mortar.

Walls: brick masonry with lime mortar.

Floors: marble, tile, and wood.

Cover: brick shells with lime mortar.

Downspouts: ducts formed in the walls of the bricks.

Plaster: only inside, with whitewash.

Ceiling: pasted and painted, false plaster.

Stairs: brick with lime mortar.

Structure: constituted by columns and arches.

Columns: brick masonry with lime mortar.

Arches: brick and lime mortar.

Doors: iron and wood.

Windows: wood, metal, and decorated glass.

Decorative moldings: brick, plaster, ceramics, and marble.

=== Facilities ===
The temple is equipped with the following facilities:

Sanitary: potable water system and wastewater channeling.

Electrical: lighting system and power shut-offs.

Special: acoustic amplification system.

All these facilities are conducted by independent underground duct systems under the floor. There are inspection wells located on-site for control and maintenance as well as control boxes for the water and electrical systems.

== Maintenance ==
Cracking problems have arisen in some elements:

- The first High Dome after the Towers. Here, the crack reached up to 1 cm and 1.50 cm, and when it rained, water leaked out. However, this was fixed by covering it with a cement paste. On the advice of the engineers José Chacón Toral and Rafael Carrasco, the cracked are was monitored and further cracking has not progressed.
- On the key of the arch, area that covers the rosette of the main facade. According to architect Ramírez, this was caused by faults in the construction of the cathedral. When the respective arrangements were made in the area, the interior of the fissure was reinforced, but not the exterior.

Is believed that these problems are due to the land that the foundation rests upon. In 1972, geological studies of the foundation ground and loading capacity were carried out by engineers Marco T. Erazo V. and Edmundo Cueva C. These studies were conducted in a pit five meters deep, excavated at the foot of the South Tower, whose foundations are four meters away. The studies found that the terrain should have a support capacity of up to 4 kg./cm2.

Additionally, every six months there is general cleaning work carried out on the roofs, as large amounts of garbage accumulate (plastic, paper, earth, vegetables, etc.) that clogs the channels and downpipes of rainwater and produce leaks.
