= Dächingen =

Coordinates: 48°19′N 9°37′E

Dächingen
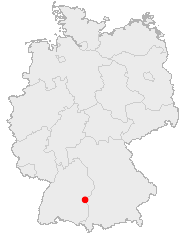
Coat of arms	Map of Germany showing Dächingen
Coat of Arms of Dächingen	Map of Germany showing Ulm (Daechingen)
Basic Information
Postal code:	89584
License plate prefix:	UL (Ulm)

Dächingen (Daechingen) is a village on the Swabian Alb located next to the town of Ehingen (Donau), approximately 25 km. southwest of Ulm in the Alb-Donau district in Baden-Württemberg, Germany.

== History ==
The place name "Dächingen" first appears in the Zwiefalten Chronicles at the beginning of the 12th century. A Berthold von Dächingen is documented from 1263 to 1271. He is said to have been a servant of the Counts of Wartstein. South of Dächingen lay Hochdorf Castle, which was destroyed by the Ulm family in 1387 during the Town War.

Since 1270, Dächingen was a fief of the Counts of Württemberg, as part of the domain of the Lords of Steußlingen. In the 14th century, the latter enfeoffed the town to the Lords of Freyberg, and later to citizens of Ulm and Ehingen. In 1479 and 1507, Dächingen came under the jurisdiction of the Holy Spirit Hospital in Ehingen. Dächingen belonged to the Oberamt (District) of Ehingen in 1806; in 1820, the town received its own mayor. Previously, Dächingen had been administered from Altsteußlingen.

The Ried Chapel—located east of the village center—was first documented in 1465. It was a branch of the Altsteußlingen parish. Called "Maria im Elend," the chapel became a popular destination for pilgrims. The present church in the village center was built in 1848 in the former tithe barn. The church tower dates from 1993/94.

On 1 December 1973, Dächingen was incorporated into Ehingen.
