= Church of the Sagrario, Jaén =

Catholic church in Andalusia, Spain

Church of the Sagrario
- Spanish: Iglesia del Sagrario
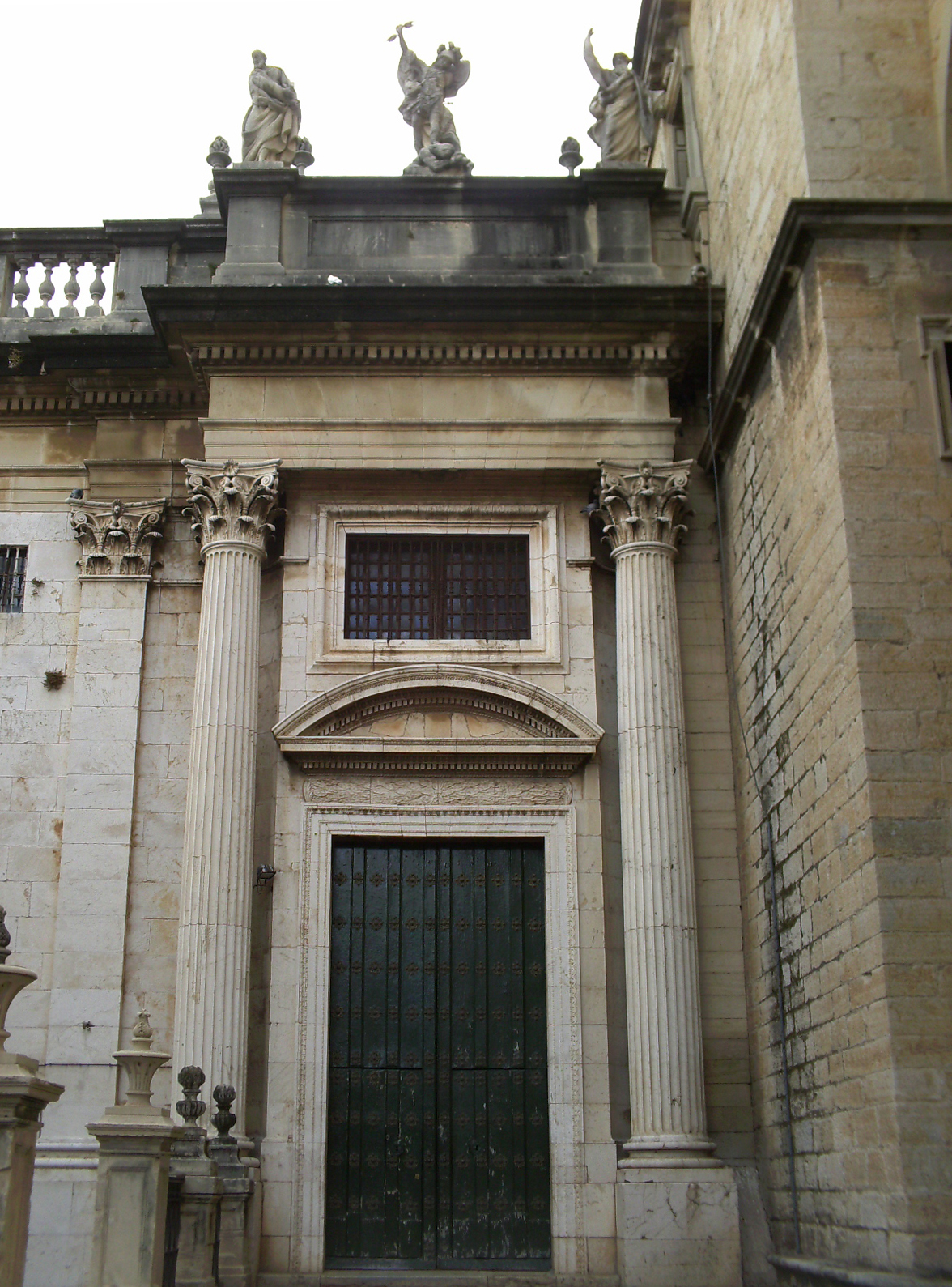
- Main facade of the Church of the Sagrario

Religion
- Affiliation: Catholic Church
- Year consecrated: 1801

Location
- Location: Jaén, Spain
- Interactive map of Church of the Sagrario
- Coordinates: 37.7653°N 3.7897°W

Architecture
- Architects: Ventura Rodríguez; Manuel Martín Rodríguez
- Type: church
- Style: Renaissance; Neoclassical
- Groundbreaking: 1764
- Completed: 1801

The Church of the Sagrario (Spanish: Iglesia del Sagrario) is a building attached to the north facade of the Jaén Cathedral, made due to the unevenness and damage caused by the Lisbon earthquake of 1755. The project for this work was designed by the Madrid architect Ventura Rodríguez in 1764, although it was executed by his nephew Manuel Martín Rodríguez. It was inaugurated in 1801 and was consecrated on March 22 of that year.

== See also ==
- Jaén Cathedral
