= Old Cathedral of Cuenca =

Church of the Shrine Iglesia del Sagrario (in Spanish)
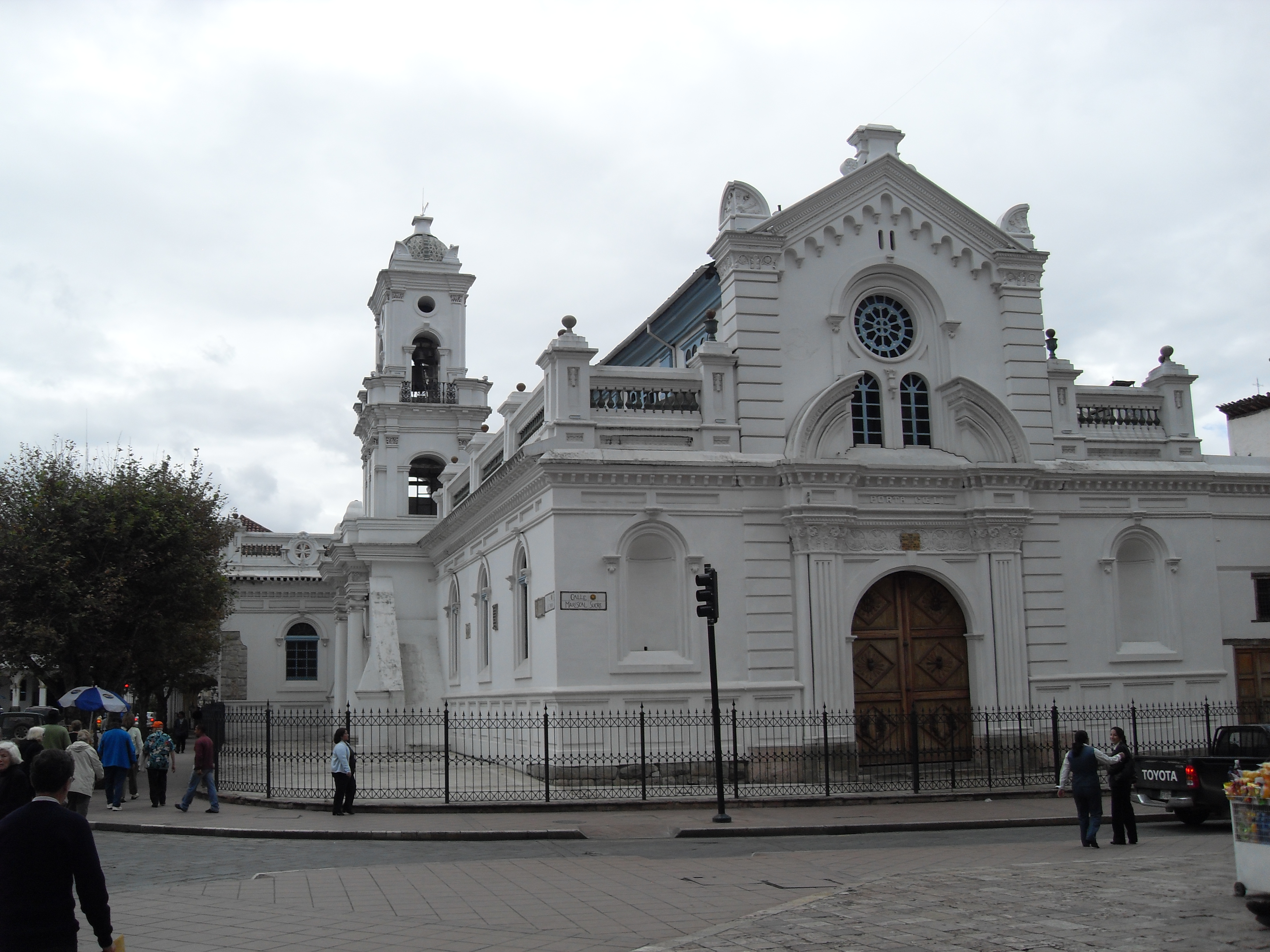

- Location within Ecuador

Location
- Location: Cuenca, Ecuador
- Coordinates: 2.897837°S 79.00385°W

Architecture
- Type: Basilica
- Style: Baroque
- Groundbreaking: 1567
- Completed: 1791

UNESCO World Heritage Site
- Part of: Historic Centre of Santa Ana de los Ríos de Cuenca
- Criteria: Cultural: (ii)(iv)(v)
- Reference: 863
- Inscription: 1999 (23rd Session)

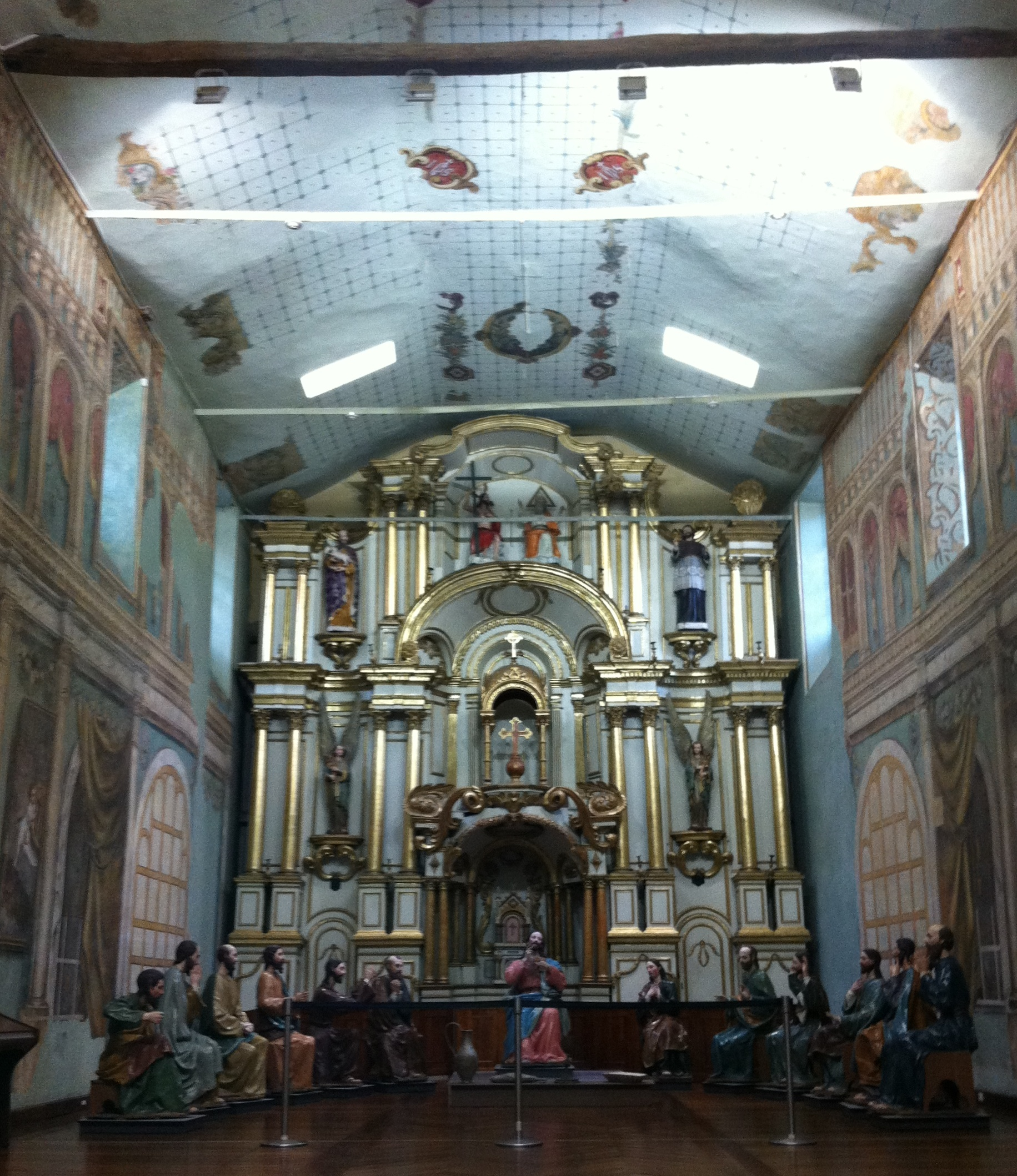
The High Altar, with sculptural group depicting Christ and his Disciples.

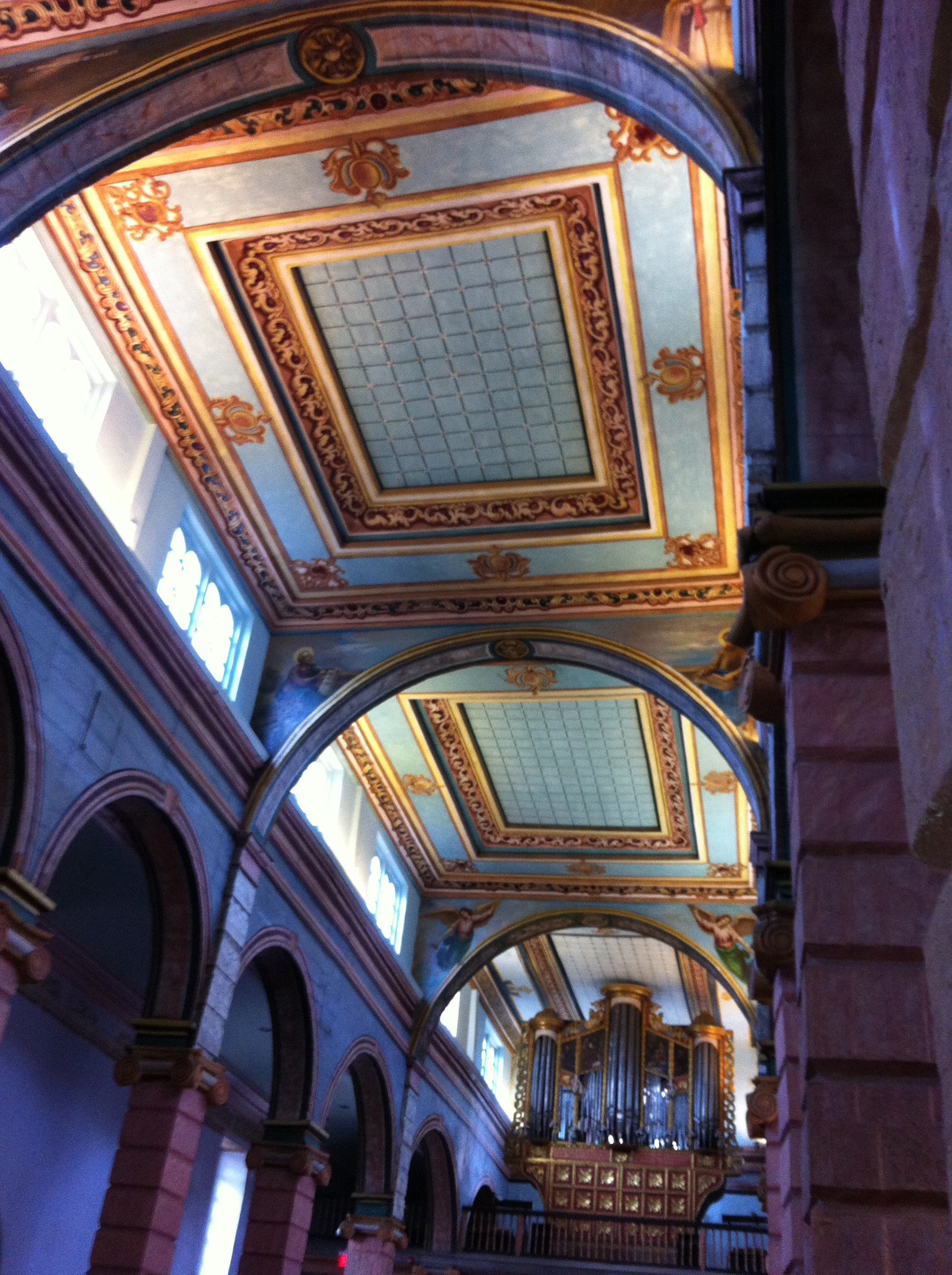
Roof of the Old Cathedral; the organ in the choir is above the main entrance.

The Sagrario Church (Shrine Church) - also known as the Old Cathedral of Cuenca is a temple whose construction began in the mid-16th century, and was considered the main Spanish place of worship during the time of Spanish colonization in Cuenca (Ecuador). Today it functions as the Museum of Religious Art, known for its wide variety of altars and the history it offers. It is located in the center of the city of Cuenca, and one of its most emblematic museums, which is located in Parque Calderón, in front of the New Cathedral.

It is part of the Historic Center, the same one that was named a World Heritage Site by UNESCO in 1999, making it one of the most emblematic places in Cuenca as it is the only church that has a bellows organ, which is It is located inside at the back of the building. It was used as a musical accompaniment to the choirs. However, it is now out of service.

== History ==
Planning for the church started in 1557 and construction began ten years later, using stones for the foundation and walls from the ruins of Tomebamba. During the colonial period the church was the main center of worship for the "Parish of the Spaniards"; it was reserved for the people from Spain, while indigenous people had to stay outside or worship elsewhere. The organ was added in 1739, and the clock was set in the tower in 1751. In 1787 the bishopric was established in Cuenca, and the church became a cathedral. The new tower erected in 1868 carries a memorial plate: Torre más célebre que las pirámides de Egipto ("Tower more famous than the Egyptian pyramids") in reference to the use of the old tower as a key reference point for the French Geodesic Mission in 1736, which determined the arc of the meridian. In 1880 construction for the New Cathedral was begun. With the consecration of the New Cathedral, the Old Cathedral ceased to be used for regular services. After a restoration that started in 1999 the Old Cathedral serves today as the "Museum for Religious Art" and a venue for concerts and cultural events. Among others it displays sculptures by Miguel Velez and Gaspar Sangurima and paintings by Daniel Alvorado and Nicholas Vivar.

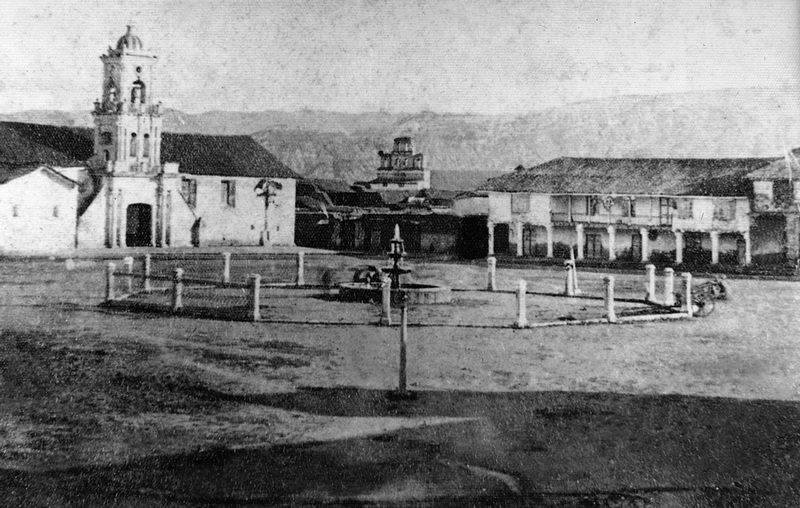
Tower of Cathedral of Cuenca in 1890.

== Architectural History of the Mother Church "El Sagrario" ==
=== Before its construction: La Calle de Santa Ana ===
When the city of Cuenca was founded in 1557, Gil Ramírez Dávalos, shaped the design of the city, assigning a block of four lots to the main church, on the east side of the central plaza. This block was crossed by a street that was called Santa Ana, to pass next to the Main Church, consecrated to Santa Ana, first patron of the city

At first, this street was non-existent, being actually a water ditch that linked the neighborhoods of San Blas and San Sebastiá. In times of rain, the street caused flooding of nearby land, so in the year of 1566, it was subjected to a change of course to avoid further inconvenience. In the 18th century, the street became colloquially called "Callejón de la Soledad"

=== The Provisional Church and the Major Church ===
There are archaeological documents that show that by 1567 there was a small provisional church (also called a hermitage), to carry out ecclesiastical celebrations, even when the official construction of the Main Church had not begun. This Provisional Church had a main door, which was directed towards the now known Calle de Santa Ana. Thanks to the efforts of Diego de Solís to obtain the requirements for the construction of the Main Church in the Real Audiencia of Quito, walls were erected around the hermitage, which were made of adobe. Serving in this way, as choir of the New Temple. For the following year, the construction of the Church had been paralyzed, because those responsible for it (cabildos), returned to their haciendas to direct their harvests. In 1569, Juan de Bermeo was chosen as Observer of the Church, who in his period of command, witnessed the construction and completion of this. Francisco de San Miguel was responsible for said design and supervision, together with Diego Alonso Márquez he was assigned the construction of a brick enclosure, to prevent damage from flooding.

=== First modification of the Major Church (1617) ===
The first modifications to the church by order of the parish priest and observer Fr. Melchor Rojas was the one to raise the walls seven feet, then the mason Pedro Inga proceeded with the other modifications of the main chapel applying lime mixtures to its foundations. As a custom of the sixteenth century, the church sold tombs to citizens for a price of 25 or 30 pesos or one could also own one of these tombs through services provided to the church and it was thanks to these actions that it was later possible to know the layout and measurements of the construction of that time. Only the well-off sectors of Cuencan society had access to these graves, their range of importance could be observed according to the place of sepulcher, the most popular area being the ayacorral, whose meaning was fenced off from the dead.

=== Income from the factory of the Mother Church ===
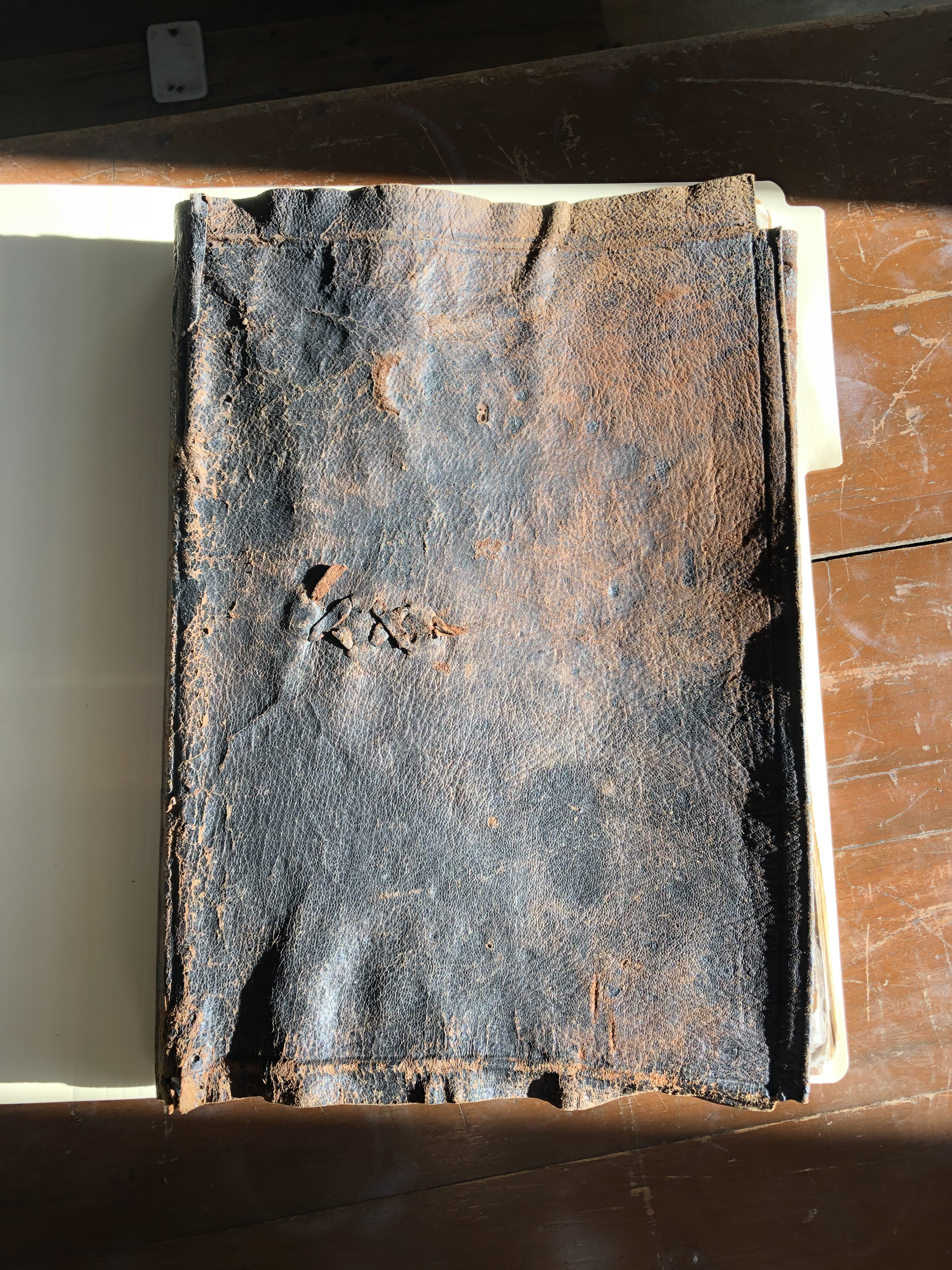
The "Primer libro de fábrica de la iglesia Matriz del Sagrario" (First book of factory of the Mother Church of Sagrario)

The church received income from alms and burial rights either in the ayacorrales or in the different naves of the church, these incomes were quite good to the point that only the alms on Mondays went to a fund for the construction of the Major church, all these values were considerable taking into account that from the year 1738 to 1746 there were 1,008 people who were buried inside the church, thus raising 5,327 pesos and 7 reales according to the records made by the church in the book "Primer libro de fábrica de la iglesia Matriz del Sagrario".

With regard to the care and administration of the church's assets, it was an observer named de fábrica who was in charge and having this appointment was an honor, since it demanded a lot of ethics and responsibility, as demonstrated by Juan de San Juan de Bermeo in his 20 years of service, however, there were others who took advantage of profiting for themselves, as was the case of Bishop Juan Gómez de Frías from Quito in 1727.

=== Chapel del Santísimo ===
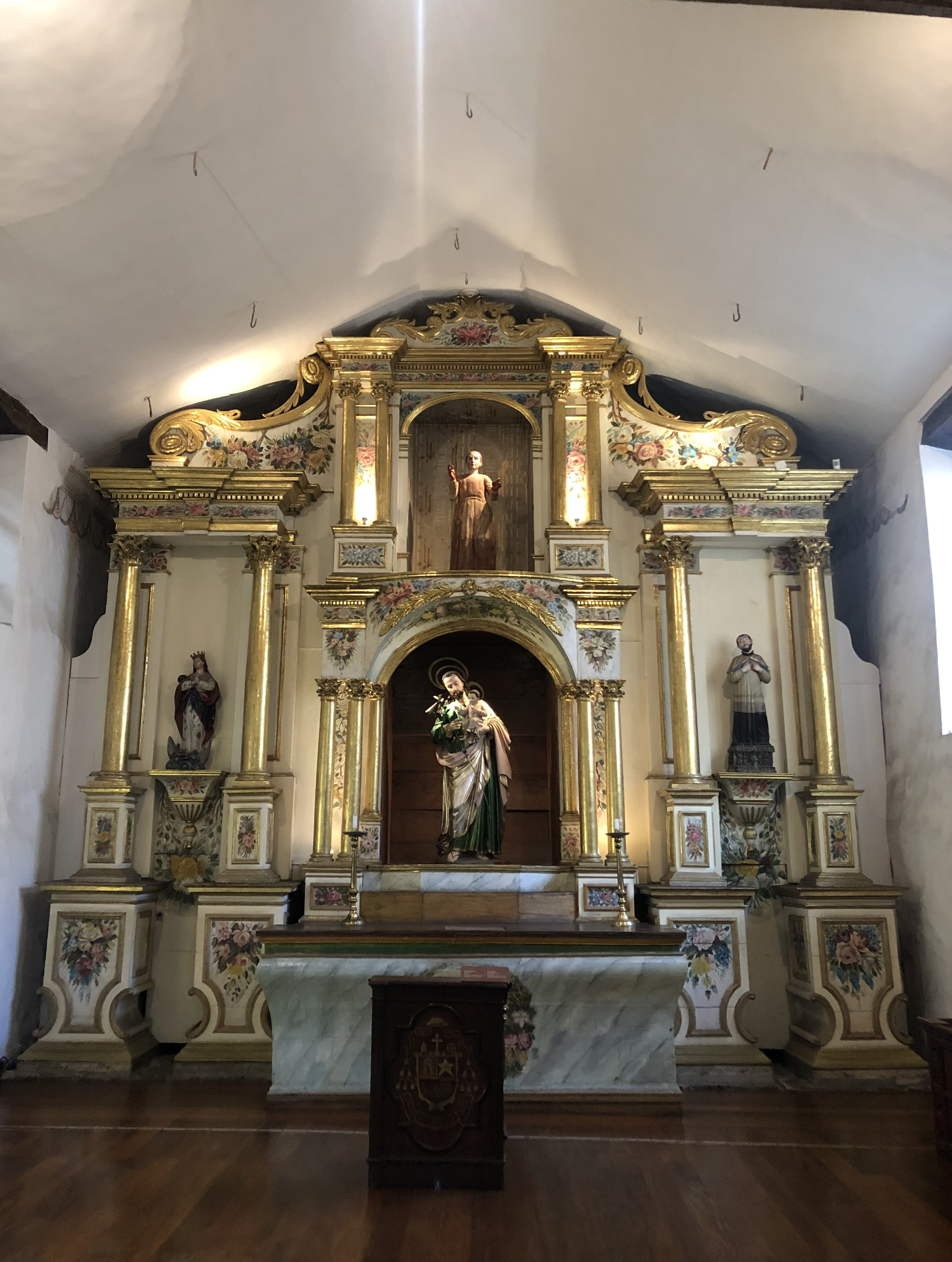
Altar dedicated to Saint Joseph, inside one of the side chapels

Along with the Major Church, construction began on a chapel attached to the west of the main building. In the 16th century, there is one of the oldest data on the history of an altar dedicated to Saint Peter that decorates this space. In the 17th century, Juan de Neira acquired a tomb, which would correspond to the crypt that is located under this chapel.

The chapel was completed in 1573, under the patronage of the family of the first Lieutenant Governor, Captain Juan de Narváez. Over time, it was awarded to Ruy López until 1649, after which it would be known as the Chapel of San Pedro. By the 19th century, the chapel would begin to be used for the veneration of the Blessed Sacrament.

=== Bishop Carrión y Marfil and his aspirations for the future of the church ===
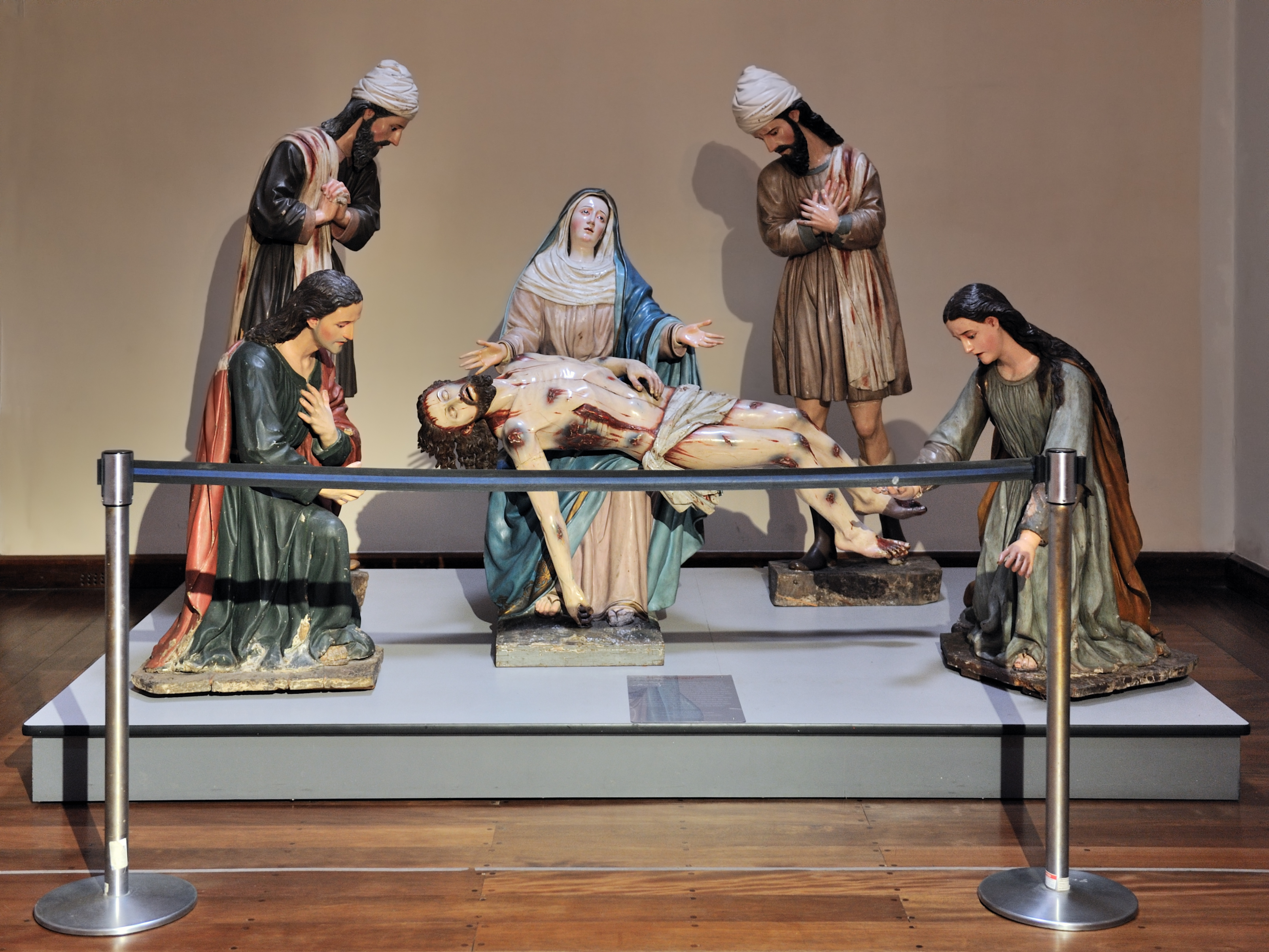
Pietá in the church

They began to make repairs to the church, once it was finished. Among the first, it occurred in the 17th century, whose objective was already to modify and condition the Major Church, with the aim of turning it into the Cathedral of Cuenca. That is why on April 27, 1786, the Real Audiencia of Quito allowed these changes, it was also approved with this the following year, that 4900 pesos be granted from the royal box, so that the church parts can be finished, and to carry out the respective repairs of the old mother church. Unfortunately, the bishop-elect of that decade, José Carrión, did not allow these repairs to be carried out, so in his opinion, it was a waste of the money granted by the Government. Instead, Carrión, together with Bishop Marfil, supported the idea, and ordered the construction of the Cathedral Church of the City of Cuenca, in order to avoid spending money on the repairs to the old church. The objective was to build a new cathedral that imitates the Cathedral of Málaga, since they had their plans to make these movements.

However, the Audiencia at this time would not give them the opportunity to make such great changes within the plans already exposed, since the reality of the means available to the people of Cuenca at that time were not optimal to pay for a cathedral. Despite the fact that the Audiencia was really specific in the sense of not building a new cathedral, Carrión and Marfil completely refused to follow their instructions to renovate the Major Church, and continued with their wishes to build a new temple.2 In this then they decided to take power from the Church of the company, from the expelled Jesuits their provisional cathedral. The position that the bishops took did not last for long, since the prebendaries who were supported by the sacred decrees mainly demanded that Bishop Carrión The order of the Real Audiencia of Quito in the year 1785, which guarantees the use of all their faculties and rights to choose and give their opinion, will be respected.

=== Renovations of Vicente Durango and Josef de Herze (1783-1791) ===
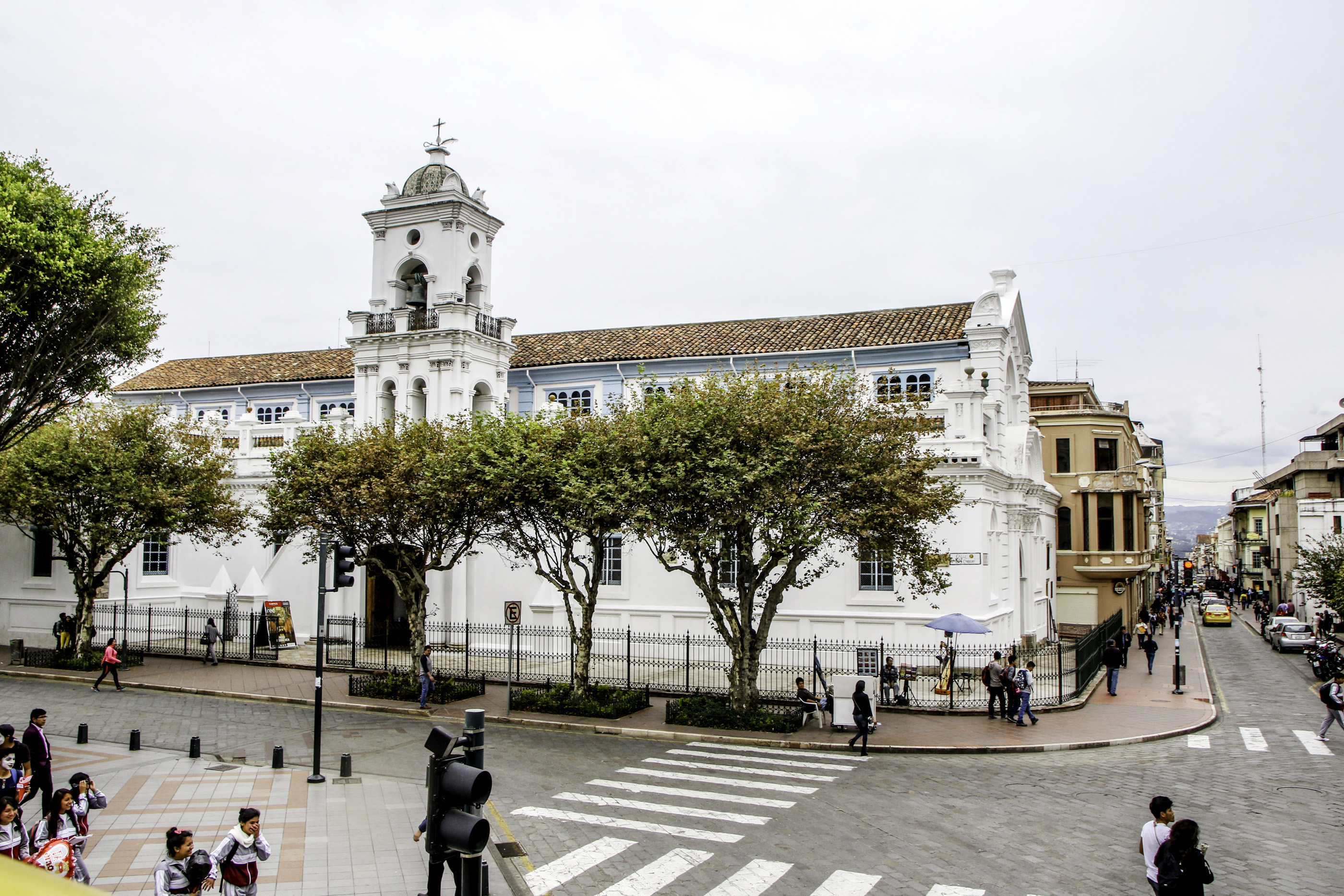
View of the cathedral

By that time, the city of Cuenca had prospered economically in a significant way as a result of artisanal, agricultural and livestock activities, so together the income of the church also increased, allowing it to be taken into account both religiously and politically by the Real Audiencia of Quito to the rise of a governorate and a bishopric.

With the growing prestige of the city also came the responsibilities of renovating the neglected city and especially the church, which was not aesthetically in good condition either, which is why Governor José Antonio de Vallejo appointed Josef Herze as observer, who was also accountant of the Real Caja de Cuenca (Cuenca royal savings banks), these two being the characters branded as profiting for themselves with the assets of the church and the search for their own honor.

== Description ==
The church has a structure typical of a colonial basilica, with three naves. There is a central altar, while the organ is located over the entrance. Walls are decorated in light pastel colors. Displayed also is a set of life-size carved figures representing Jesus and the apostles at the Last Supper. Though the cathedral has undergone a number of renovations, it has maintained its original character.

Original frescoes dating back to the late 16th century have been uncovered on the walls; other murals are from early 20th century.
