= Baños, Azuay =

Parish in Azuay, Ecuador

Baños
- Parish
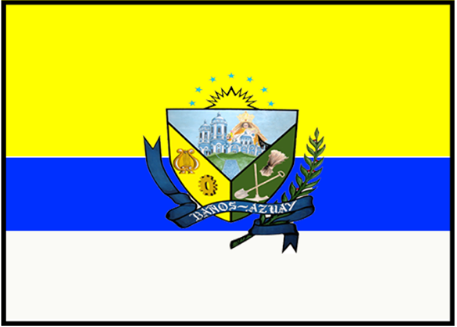
- Flag

- Location within Ecuador
- Coordinates: 2°54′S 79°4′W
- Country: Ecuador
- Province: Azuay Province
- Canton: Cuenca Canton

Area
  - Total: 126.4 sq mi (327.3 km^{2})

Population (2001)
  - Total: 12,271
- Time zone: UTC-5 (ECT)
- Climate: Cfb

Baños is a parish located to the south west in the canton Cuenca, province of Azuay, Ecuador. The parish has an area of 327.3 km^{2} and the altitude varies from 2050 to 4200 meters above sea level, with an average temperature of 14°C. It is located in the foothills of the mountain range of El Cajas, surrounded by high-altitude areas as: Chanchán, Nero, Yanasacha, Sunsún and Huasiloma. According to the Ecuador census of 2010 had a total population of 16,8611 inhabitants that correspond to 3.33% of the total population of the canton Cuenca.

== History ==
Baños as remote human settlement to the pre-colonial period, due to the existence of natural resources such as thermal waters, so it should be populated by the Cañaris. At the beginning of the seventeenth century in the colonial era, after being conquered by Spaniards who exploited gold and silver mines in the area, intermarriage between the colonizers and the native population and the purchase and sale of land started, which made possible the population growth and the division of sectors in the parish. In the republican era, in 1824, Baños was inferred as a rural parish in the city of Cuenca, but it was not until September 1, 1852, that it became legally legalized as a rural parish of the Cuenca canton.

== Geography ==
The town of Baños is located just 8 kilometres southwest of the city of Cuenca. It borders San Joaquín parish to the north, Tarqui and Victoria del Portete to the south, San Gerardo, Chumblín and San Fernando and Zhaglli to the east, and with Chaucha to the west. Baños covers an area of 327.3 km^{2}, which accounts for 10.6 percent of the total area of the canton of Cuenca.

== Education and health ==
The parish has 18 public educational establishments, of which 8 correspond to high school, 8 to elementary school and the 2 remaining to secondary education. These institutions are located in the parish center, Nero, Minas, Narancay Alto, Huizhil, Narancay Bajo and Misicata.

Baños belongs to District No. 2 and receives public health services at the Carlos Elizalde Center, which provides medical, dental and psychological consultations, as well as prenatal, delivery and postpartum care.

== Economy ==
The economy of the parish is based around retailing and tourism which accounts for most of the population, followed by agriculture and livestock which accounts for 24 per cent of the population, manufacturing industries (18%) and construction industries (17%). The main crops include maize, beans, potatoes and other vegetables. Clothes and furniture are amongst the most common products manufactured in Baños. The service sector provides jobs in the accommodation and restaurant services, transport and shops to cater for tourists visiting Cuenca and the surrounding canton. However, unemployment is a problem within the parish and led to 936 people migrating from the parish between November 1996 and 2001, mostly to the United States.

Between 2005 and 2009 the provincial government of Azuay Province invested US $1,650,000 in public works in the parish, including road infrastructure, educational facilities, sanitation, and socio-economic projects, some of them being water development schemes.
