= La Unión, Azuay =

La Unión
- Parish
- Location within Ecuador
- Coordinates: 2°51′S 78°47′W
- Country: Ecuador
- Province: Azuay Province
- Canton: Chordeleg Canton

Area
  - Total: 5.4 sq mi (14.1 km^{2})

Population (2001)
  - Total: 1,622
- Time zone: UTC-5 (ECT)

La Unión is a town and parish in Chordeleg Canton, Azuay Province, Ecuador. The parish covers an area of 14.1 km² and according to the 2001 Ecuadorian census it had a population total of 1,622.
