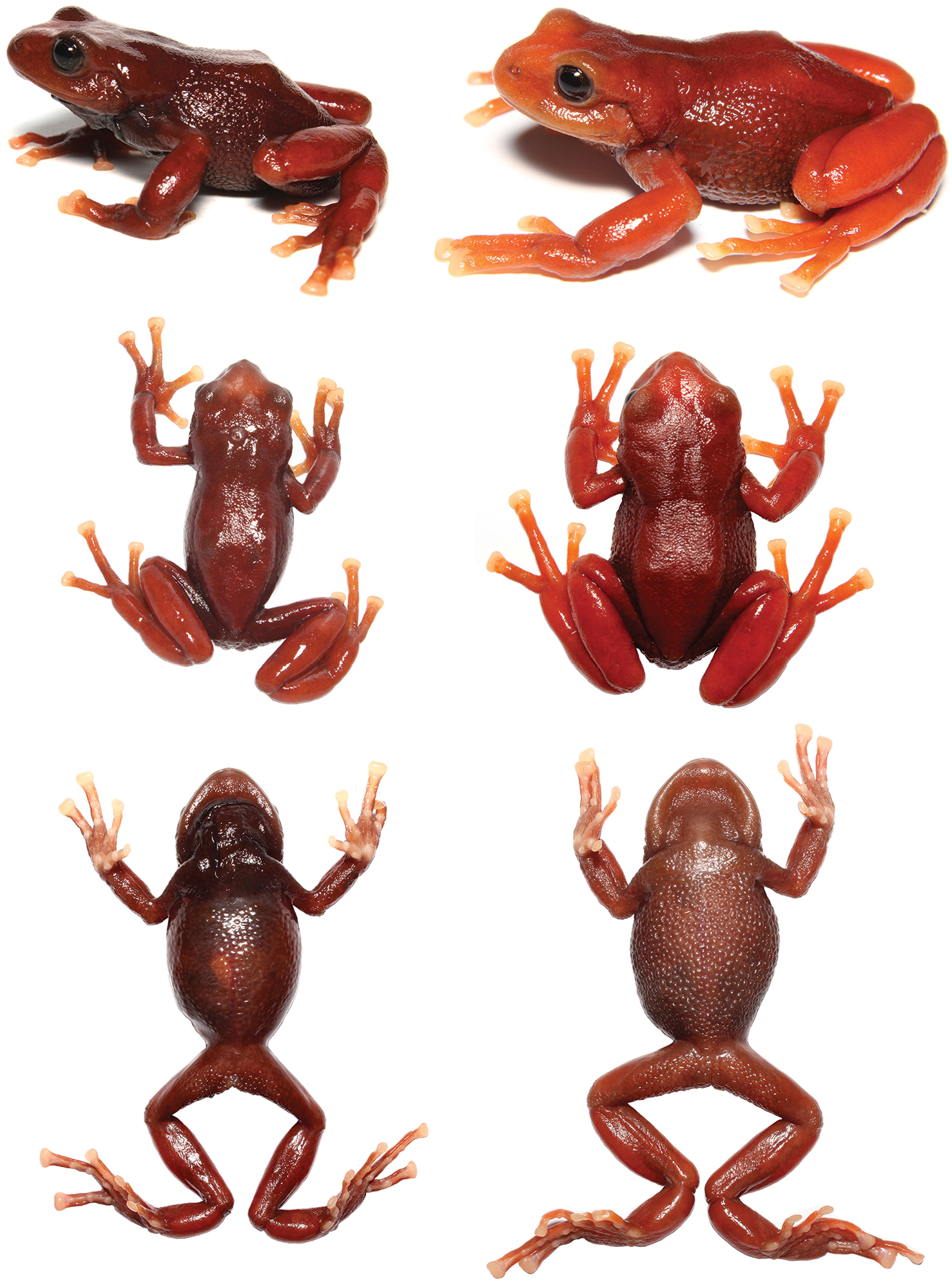
- Lateral, dorsal and ventral views of a male (left) and a female (right).

Scientific classification
- Kingdom: Animalia
- Phylum: Chordata
- Class: Amphibia
- Order: Anura
- Clade: Brachycephaloidea
- Family: Craugastoridae
- Genus: Pristimantis
- Species: P. erythros

Binomial name
- Pristimantis erythros Sánchez-Nivicela, Celi-Piedra, Posse-Sarmiento, Urgiles, Yánez-Muñoz & Cisneros-Heredia, 2018
- Place where the holotype was found in Ecuador

= Pristimantis erythros =

Species of amphibian

Pristimantis erythros is a species of amphibian in the family Craugastoridae, and can be found in Cajas National Park in Chiquintad parish, Ecuador.

Its striking characteristics are its scarlet red coloration, which differentiates it from all the species of the genus Pristimantis, and the presence of parotid glands on the trapezius and suprascapular muscles. It has an average length of 38 to 42 millimeters in females and 37 millimeters in males. It has direct development, as do all the species of its genus, and does not have an aquatic larval stage.

It was described on April 20, 2018, in the scientific journal ZooKeys by a group of six researchers. Its specific epithet derives from the Greek word ἐρυθρός (erythros), meaning red, an allusion to its unique coloration. It has not yet been catalogued by the International Union for Conservation of Nature, but because it is losing habitat and occupies an area smaller than one square kilometer, researchers classify it as a critically endangered species.

== Taxonomy ==
The species was described on April 20, 2018, in the scientific journal ZooKeys by researchers Juan C. Sánchez-Nivicela, Elvis Celi-Piedra, Valentina Posse-Sarmiento, Verónica L. Urgilés, Mario Yánez-Muñoz, and Diego F. Cisneros-Heredia. It was discovered as belonging to the genus Pristimantis, however, it was not possible to separate it into any specific clade, with P. orcesi as its phylogenetically closest species. It is differentiated from any other species of the genus by the scarlet red coloration and by the presence of cutaneous macro-glands in the suprascapular region. Its holotype was found in Chiquintad parish, Azuay province, Ecuador, at an altitude of 3 449 meters, in October 2014, being an adult female. The paratypes were also found at the same location, between October and November 2014, being males, females, and juveniles.

Its specific epithet derives from the Greek word ἐρυθρός (erythros), meaning red, an allusion to the color of its skin, which allows it to be distinguished from other species.

== Distribution and conservation ==
The only place where there are observation records of the species is in the Cajas National Park, more precisely in the parish of Chiquintad. The biome of the site is páramo, where grasses and shrubs are present. All individuals found so far have been seen in terrestrial bromeliads (Puya hamata) and grasses (Neurolepis villosa), near small streams.

The park where it is endemic seems to be well preserved, but due to human pressure, the change of vegetation cover, anthropological use of the land and the lack of protection in the surrounding regions, the species is suffering the loss of its habitat, which currently corresponds to an area smaller than one square kilometer. Because of this, its discoverers classify it as a critically endangered species (CR). Its conservation status has not yet been assessed by the International Union for Conservation of Nature (IUCN).

== Description and behavior ==
Its average length varies between 38,8 and 42,6 millimeters in females and 36,7 and 37 in males. Its head is as wide as its body, but corresponds to only 8% of its length, its snout is short and rounded when viewed from the side and back, its canthus rostralis is rounded, the loreal region is concave and its nostrils are protuberant, with a flat interorbital region. Its parotid glands cover 65% of the dorsal suprascapular muscle and more than a quarter of the trapezius. Its tympanic membrane is distinguishable from the adjacent tissues, being surrounded by about one third of the tympanic ring and corresponding to 52% of the eye diameter. Its choana is broad and rounded, with the tongue being wide and long, 25% of which is attached to the mouth. There are no protuberances on its back and its belly is areolate.

Its back and belly are dark red, with the legs and limbs having a lighter shade of red, and the toes having a rose color. Its iris is dark brown, with golden spots.

Like all species of its genus, it has direct development, with no aquatic larval stage, and with the eggs being laid on the forest floor, and can live without needing bodies of water. The individuals vocalize twice a day, from 8 to 11 am and from 5 to 7 pm local time. Its period of greatest activity is between dusk and 9 pm, and after that, the individuals tend to become less active.
