= Luis Galarza Orellana =

- Parish
- Interactive map of Luis Galarza Orellana
- Coordinates: 2°59′38″S 78°42′59″W
- Country: Ecuador
- Province: Azuay Province
- Canton: Chordeleg Canton

Area
  - Total: 12 sq mi (30 km^{2})

Population (2001)
  - Total: 1,572
- Time zone: UTC-5 (ECT)

Luis Galarza Orellana is a town and parish in Chordeleg Canton, Azuay Province, Ecuador. The parish covers an area of 30 km² and according to the 2001 Ecuadorian census it had a population total of 1,572.
