= Tarqui =

Tarqui may refer to:

- Tarqui, Huila, Colombia
- Tarqui, Cuenca Canton, Ecuador
- Tarqui, Guayaquil Canton, Ecuador
- Tarqui, Pastaza Canton, Ecuador
