= Quingeo =

- Parish
- Location within Ecuador
- Coordinates: 3°1′S 78°55′W
- Country: Ecuador
- Province: Azuay Province
- Canton: Cuenca Canton

Area
  - Total: 44.1 sq mi (114.2 km^{2})

Population (2001)
  - Total: 5,646
- Time zone: UTC-5 (ECT)
- Climate: Cfb

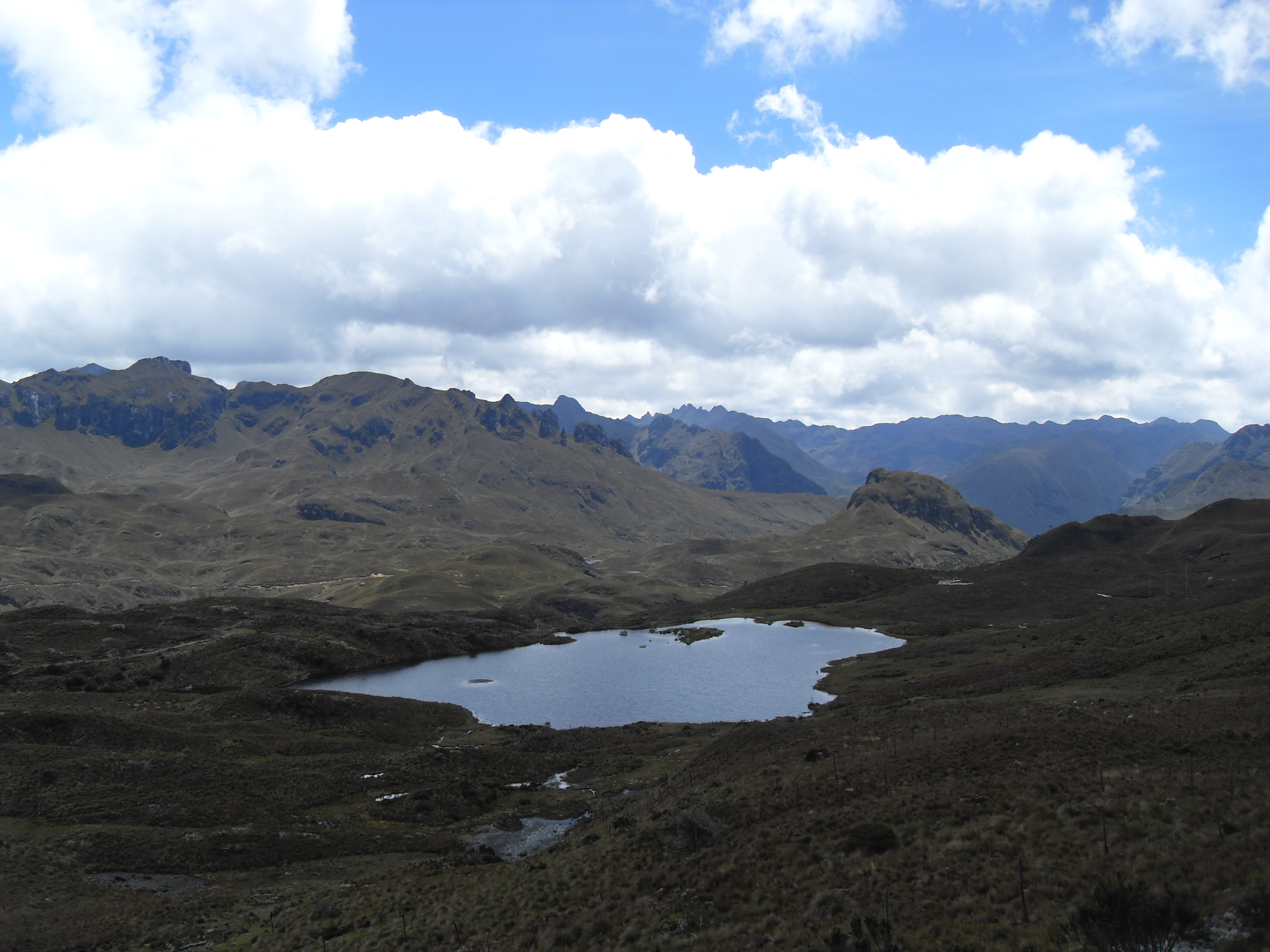
Cajas lagoon, in the same Canton as Quingeo

Quingeo is a town and parish in Cuenca Canton, Azuay Province, Ecuador. The parish covers an area of 114.2 km² and according to the 2001 Ecuadorian census it had a population total of 5,646.
