= Sidcay =

- Parish
- Location within Ecuador
- Coordinates: 2°50′S 78°57′W
- Country: Ecuador
- Province: Azuay Province
- Canton: Cuenca Canton

Area
  - Total: 6.6 sq mi (17 km^{2})

Population (2001)
  - Total: 3,439
- Time zone: UTC-5 (ECT)

Sidcay (Spanish pronunciation: [siðˈkaj]) is a town and parish in Cuenca Canton, Azuay Province, Ecuador. The parish covers an area of 17 km^{2} and according to the 2001 Ecuadorian census it had a population total of 3,439.
