= Molleturo =

- Parish
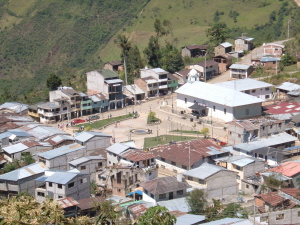

- Location within Ecuador
- Coordinates: 2°45′S 79°26′W
- Country: Ecuador
- Province: Azuay Province
- Canton: Cuenca Canton

Area
  - Total: 329.5 sq mi (853.4 km^{2})

Population (2001)
  - Total: 5,221
- Time zone: UTC-5 (ECT)
- Climate: Cwb

Molleturo is a town and parish in Cuenca Canton, Azuay Province, Ecuador. The parish covers an area of 853.4 km² and according to the 2001 Ecuadorian census it had a population total of 5,221.
