= Nulti =

- Parish
- Location within Ecuador
- Coordinates: 2°55′S 78°51′W
- Country: Ecuador
- Province: Azuay Province
- Canton: Cuenca Canton

Area
  - Total: 12.1 sq mi (31.3 km^{2})

Population (2001)
  - Total: 4,589
- Time zone: UTC-5 (ECT)
- Climate: Cfb

Nulti is a town and parish in Cuenca Canton, Azuay Province, Ecuador. The parish covers an area of 31.3 km^{2} and according to the 2001 Ecuadorian census it had a population total of 4,589.
