= Flight 173 =

Flight 173 may refer to:

Listed chronologically

- United Airlines Flight 173, crashed on 28 December 1978
- TAME Flight 173, crashed on 11 July 1983
