= Checa, Ecuador =

Checa
- Parish
- Location within Ecuador
- Coordinates: 2°47′S 79°0′W
- Country: Ecuador
- Province: Azuay Province
- Canton: Cuenca Canton

Area
  - Total: 24.9 sq mi (64.5 km^{2})

Population (2001)
  - Total: 2,698
- Time zone: UTC-5 (ECT)
- Climate: Cfb

Checa or Jidcay is a town and parish in Cuenca Canton, Azuay Province, Ecuador. The parish covers an area of 64.5 km^{2} and according to the 2001 Ecuadorian census it had a population total of 2,698.
