= Sinincay =

- Parish
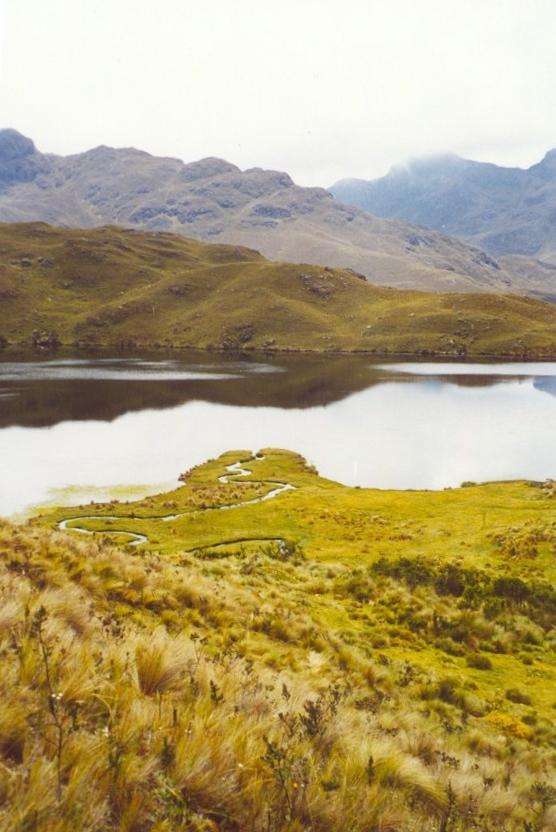

- Location within Ecuador
- Coordinates: 2°50′S 79°0′W
- Country: Ecuador
- Province: Azuay Province
- Canton: Cuenca Canton

Area
  - Total: 9.6 sq mi (24.9 km^{2})

Population (2001)
  - Total: 12,650
- Time zone: UTC-5 (ECT)
- Climate: Cfb

Sinincay is a town and parish in Cuenca Canton, Azuay Province, Ecuador. The parish covers an area of 24.9 km² and according to the 2001 Ecuadorian census it had a population total of 12,650.
