= Paccha =

Paccha San Francisco de Paccha (Saint Francis of Paccha) San Francisco de Asis de Paccha (Saint Francis of Paccha)
- Parish
- Location within Ecuador
- Coordinates: 2°54′S 78°56′W
- Country: Ecuador
- Province: Azuay Province
- Canton: Cuenca Canton
- Parish Saint Francis of Paccha: May 12, 1582

Government Teniente Parroquial (Parich Lieutenant & "Junta Parroquial" (Parish Assembly) .
  - Type: Democratic

Area
  - Total: 9.9 sq mi (25.6 km^{2})

Population (2001)
  - Total: 5,311
- Time zone: UTC-5 (ECT)

Paccha (Hispanicized spelling of the Kichwa word pakcha meaning "waterfall") is a town and parish in Cuenca Canton, Azuay Province, Ecuador. The parish covers an area of 25.6 km^{2} and according to the 2001 Ecuadorian census it had a population total of 5,311.

== Origins ==
Founded "Parish Saint Francis of Paccha", on May 12, 1582, it is one of the oldest parishes that make the City of Cuenca. Conformed by 20 villages (caserios), the parish is located 10 km from the center of the city of Cuenca. Some villages are relatively close to the center of the city, Little Monay Village being the closest about 4 km away from the center of the city.

The name and meaning of Paccha could be interpreted and sourced in two ways, both originating from the Pre-Colonial period or even before the invasion and conquering by the Inca Empire. One possible meaning lies in the fact that in the native language of the region, including the Inca Empire the Quechua meaning for Paccha (Pachamama) is our Mother Earth. Although for the Inca's, the Pachamama was also a Goddess similar to the goddess Demeter in the Greek Mythology. Another possible historical meaning lies in the fact that Paccha was also the name of the Princess Paccha, a princess from the northern lands, who married the Inca Emperor Huayna Capac in order to stop the conflict which, in this case, was the invasion of the Inca empire. Once the Incas had conquered the land that now makes Ecuador, they fostered the last Inca Emperor Atahualpa.

== Cultural History ==
There are no official records, nor any kind of research on the cultural value of Paccha. Actually, this Parish holds a lot of history and many historical sites including ancient ruins and vocal folklore in the form of legends that hardly survived the pass of time. Paccha is also one of the few Parishes of the City of Cuenca that traditionally make the Panama Hats known locally as "Sombrero de Paja Toquilla"(straw hats) plus many other traditional goods. The actual historical development of this Parish is unfortunately lost to the past of time, the little known history exists only as tales of the past told by the older generations. Yet the existence of certain objects, edification, places and local vocal folklore tells the abundant history of this Parish. Among the most prominent are the following.

=== Central Church ===
Named "Sanctuary of our lady of Sorrow" the Parish of Paccha by tradition is catholic like most of the City of Cuenca and Ecuador. Because of this factor, history, tradition, religion and development go hand in hand. The central church is one example of that; while the building itself is only 50 years old, its contents are more traditional: the altar is a wood carving, made using traditional methods found only in traditional Colonial styled churches. Originally the altar was a different color--green, purple, red, and few others but "Natural Aged Wood" color being the most prominent. Around 1998 the head priest at the time "Father Pedro Soto" noticed the deteriorated state of the Altar and started the work to repair the Altar. In the end the color was changed to a Gold Inca color and a section was added to the top of the altar. The decision to change the color to Gold was to match with the Altar of the Central Cathedral of Cuenca.

=== Village Chapel ===
Since the Parish of Paccha is made out of 20 small villages, each village have their own chapel each one featuring different architecture. Also each Village has its own patron saint.
