= Turi, Ecuador =

Turi
- Parish
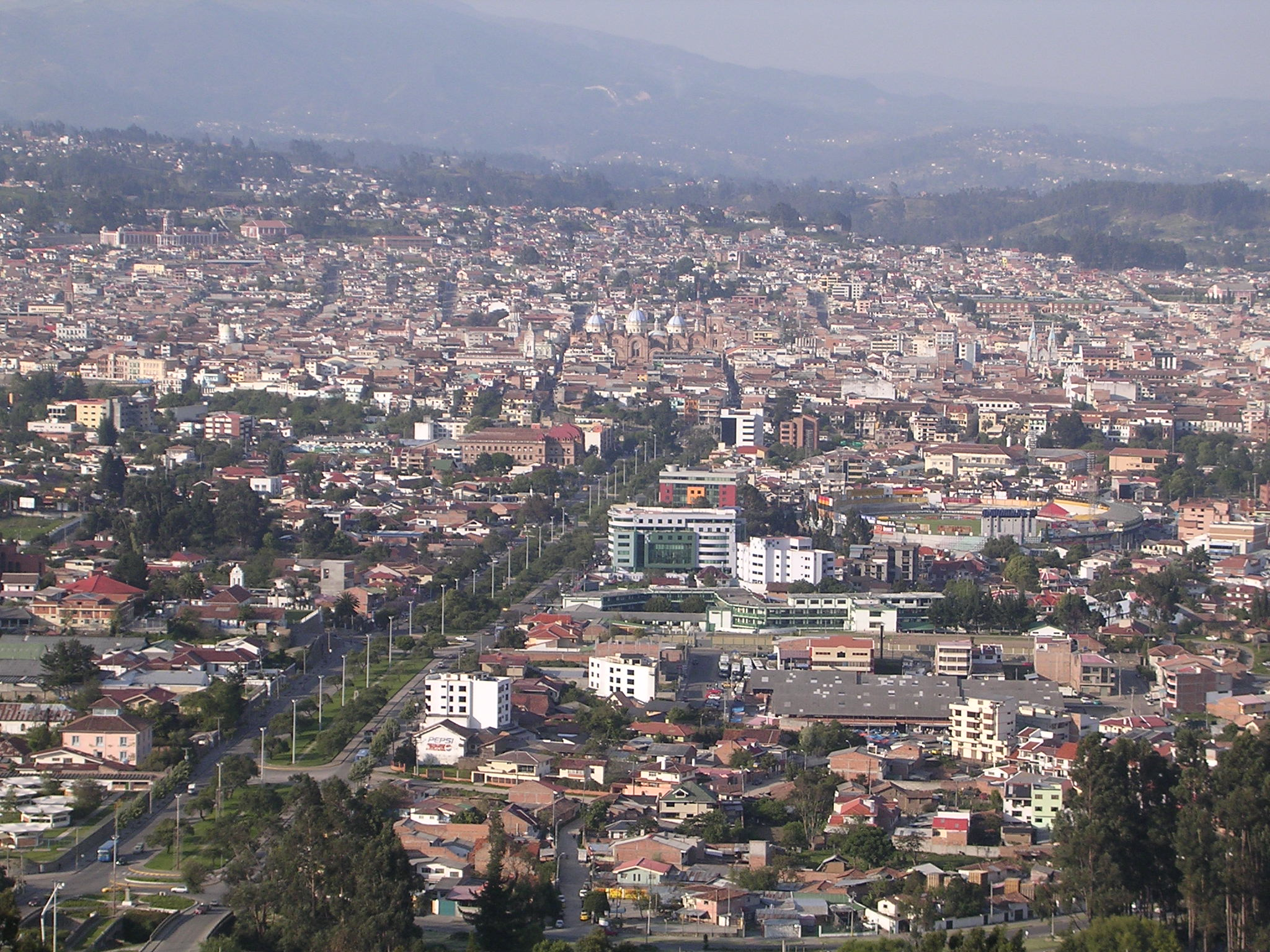
- View of Cuenca from Turi

- Location within Ecuador
- Coordinates: 2°57′S 78°59′W
- Country: Ecuador
- Province: Azuay Province
- Canton: Cuenca Canton

Area
  - Total: 10.1 sq mi (26.2 km^{2})

Population (2001)
  - Total: 6,692
- Time zone: UTC-5 (ECT)
- Climate: Cfb

Turi is a town and parish in Cuenca Canton, Azuay Province, Ecuador. The parish covers an area of 26.2 km² and according to the 2001 Ecuadorian census it had a population total of 6,692. It is perched on a hill with a public park that features an overlook of the city of Cuenca; perhaps and the only site where the entire city can be observed while still on the ground.

There are artisan shops outside of the church that sell boots and hats, while a number of souvenir stalls dot the roadway.

The Turi Church and observation point is a stop on the Cuenca bus tour.
