= Chordeleg =

- Town and parish
- Location within Ecuador
- Coordinates: 2°56′S 78°46′W
- Country: Ecuador
- Province: Azuay Province
- Canton: Chordeleg Canton

Area
  - Town: 2.95 km^{2} (1.14 sq mi)
  - Parish: 16.3 km^{2} (6.3 sq mi)

Population (2022 census)
  - Town: 4,445
  - Density: 1,510/km^{2} (3,900/sq mi)
  - Parish: 6,907
  - Parish density: 424/km^{2} (1,100/sq mi)
- Time zone: UTC-5 (ECT)
- Climate: Cfb

Chordeleg (Spanish pronunciation: [tʃoɾˈðeleɣ]) is a town and parish and seat of Chordeleg Canton, Azuay Province, Ecuador. The parish covers an area of 16.3 km^{2} (6.3 sq mi) and according to the 2022 Ecuadorian census it had a population of 6,907.

Chordeleg is well known for its jewelry industry, especially gold and silver filigree jewelry.
