= Octavio Cordero Palacios (writer) =

Ecuadorian writer

- Born: May 3, 1870; Azuay, Ecuador
- Died: December 17, 1930 (aged 60)
- Occupations: Writer, Playwright, Poet, Mathematician, Lawyer, Professor, Inventor

Octavio Cordero Palacios (Santa Rosa, Azuay, May 3, 1870 – December 17, 1930) was an Ecuadorian writer, playwright, poet, mathematician, lawyer, professor and inventor.

Today a town and parish in Cuenca is named after him.

== Biography ==
Octavio Cordero Palacios was born on May 3, 1870. His father was Vicente Cordero Crespo, a poet who authored the play in verse "Don Lucas", and who was a scribe in Cuenca in 1889, and a conservative journalist and editor of the journal "El Criterio" in 1895. His mother was Rosa Palacios Alvear. Both of his parents were from Cuenca.

In 1890 he premiered his play in three acts "Gazul", whose scenes take place in Persia at the end of the First Crusade. His second play was "Los Hijos de Atahualpa", and in 1892 he wrote the play "Los Borrachos". He was also a translator, he published "Rapsodias Clásicas" a Spanish translation of works by Virgil and Horace. He also translated works from French and English into Spanish, including a faithful rendition of Edgar Allan Poe's "The Raven".

Also in 1890 he earned a doctorate in jurisprudence from the University of Cuenca, and practiced as a lawyer at the Superior Court of Azuay. In 1900 he taught literature and philosophy at the Benigno Malo School.

In 1910 during the armed conflict with Peru, he joined the army reserves with the rank of sergeant major, and was named chief of engineers of the First South Division. He created a topographic military map of Ecuador's southern border, and taught courses at the University of Cuenca on planimetry, altimetry, and the layout of roads, and construction of bridges and causeways.

In 1916 he published the book "Vida de Abdón Calderón". That year he was also elected Senator of Azuay (a post he held til 1918). He was elected the Judge of the Superior Court of Justice, a post which he held for 10 years.

in 1922 he published "De Potencia a Potencia", a historical essay on the continued battle between the governor of Azuay Manuel Vega and President García Moreno. That year he also published the essay "El arte poético de Horacio".

In 1923 he published "El quichua y el Cañari" a philological study of Quechua and Cañari languages, with a Cañari Dictionary, which was awarded "La Palma de Oro" Prize.

In 1924 he published his incomplete work on the death of Juan Seniergues. He had already published the following essays: "Don José Antonio Vallejo, su primera gobernación entre 1.777 y 1.784", "El Azuay Histórico", "Pro Tomebamba", "Crónicas Documentadas para la Historia de Cuenca" and he promised to publish two new books, which he never did, perhaps due to his impoverished state. In 1929 he published "La Poesía de Ciencia".

== Inventions ==
In 1902 he created a mechanical computer he named "Clave Poligráfíca" or "Metaglota". The device translated words from one language to another language. After his death, his cousin Humberto Cordero reconstructed the machine and exhibited it in Quito in 1936. The exhibit was a success, and the computer was hailed as a "marvelous mechanical dictionary". He also invented a "numerical device that calculated perfectly the square root of numbers", as well as a "trigonometry text in verse".

== Death ==
In 1930 he was suffering from cirrhosis. He then told his children that he would die soon, and that they should inscribe the following verse on his tomb rather than his name:

Si hiere....hiere....y hiere de Dios la augusta mano
¿Qué hacer? ¡Caer por la tierra, hundir la frente en ella
y recibir silente– centella tras centella
el fuego todo y la ira del rayo soberano!

Translation:

If the majestic hand of God injures … injures … and injures
What to do? Fall on the ground, bury your forehead into it
and receive silently – spark after spark
all the fire and ire of the sovereign lightning!

He then announced to his children that he would die on December 17 of that year, 1930. As he had predicted, on exactly December 17, at 6:30 PM, he died while reciting the Ecuadorian National Anthem.

He is interred in the Illustrious Personages Mausoleum plot in the Patrimonial Municipal Cemetery of Cuenca.

== Personal life ==
He was married to Victoria Crespo Astudillo, with whom he had many children.
