= Llacao =

- Parish
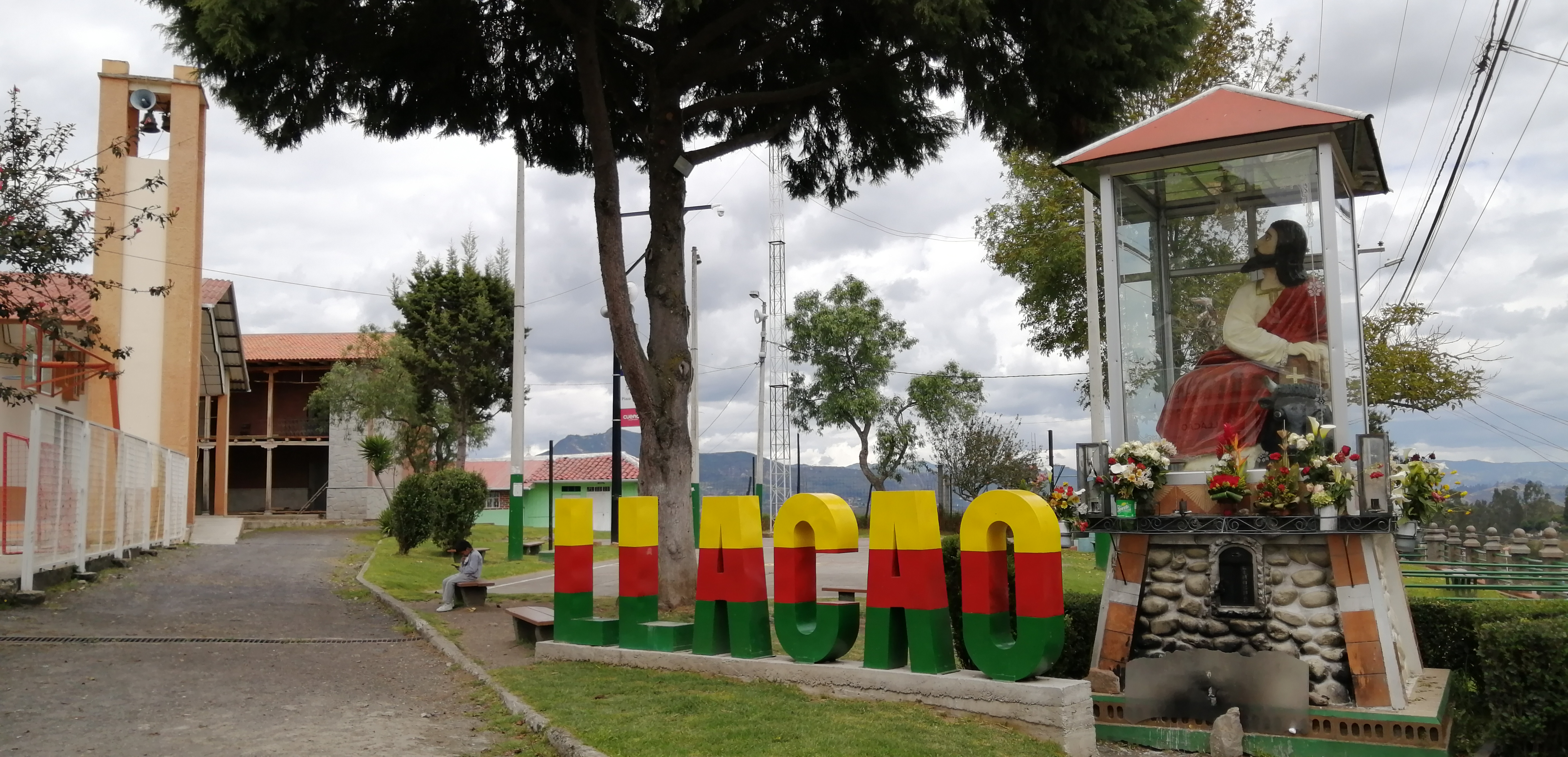

- Location within Ecuador
- Coordinates: 2°52′S 78°53′W
- Country: Ecuador
- Province: Azuay Province
- Canton: Cuenca Canton

Area
  - Total: 6.7 sq mi (17.4 km^{2})

Population (2001)
  - Total: 4,501
- Time zone: UTC-5 (ECT)

Llacao is a town and parish in Cuenca Canton, Azuay Province, Ecuador. The parish covers an area of 17.4 km^{2} and according to the 2001 Ecuadorian census it had a population total of 4501.
