= Cumbe, Ecuador =

Cumbe
- Parish
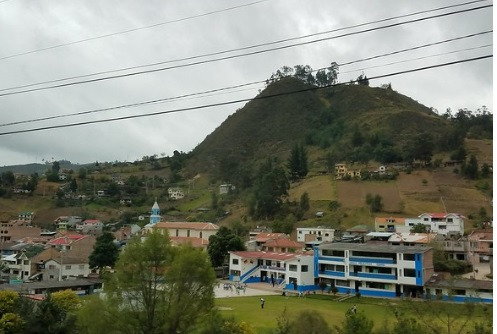

- Location within Ecuador
- Coordinates: 3°5′S 79°1′W
- Country: Ecuador
- Province: Azuay Province
- Canton: Cuenca Canton

Area
  - Total: 27.6 sq mi (71.4 km^{2})

Population (2001)
  - Total: 5,010
- Time zone: UTC-5 (ECT)

Cumbe is a parish in Cuenca Canton, Azuay Province, Ecuador. The parish covers an area of 71.4 km² and according to the 2001 Ecuadorian census it had a population total of 5,010.
