= Ricaurte, Ecuador =

Ricaurte
- Parish
- Location within Ecuador
- Coordinates: 2°52′S 78°56′W
- Country: Ecuador
- Province: Azuay Province
- Canton: Cuenca Canton

Area
  - Total: 44.1 sq mi (114.2 km^{2})

Population (2001)
  - Total: 14,006
- Time zone: UTC-5 (ECT)
- Climate: Cfb

Ricaurte is a town and parish in Cuenca Canton, Azuay Province, Ecuador. The parish covers an area of 14.3 km^{2} and according to the 2001 Ecuadorian census it had a population total of 14,006.

On July 11, 1983, a Transportes Aereos Militares Ecuatorianos (TAME) Boeing 737-200 passenger flight, which was serving the scheduled Quito-Cuenca route as TAME Flight 173, crashed into Ricaurte's Bashún Hill while on final approach to Cuenca's Mariscal Lamar International Airport. All 119 passengers were killed, making it the deadliest aviation accident in Ecuadorian history to date.

== Climate ==
Climate data for Cuenca (Ricaurte), elevation 2,562 m (8,406 ft), (1971–2000)
Month	Jan	Feb	Mar	Apr	May	Jun	Jul	Aug	Sep	Oct	Nov	Dec	Year
Mean daily maximum °C (°F)	21.2 (70.2)	21.4 (70.5)	21.1 (70.0)	21.0 (69.8)	20.3 (68.5)	19.3 (66.7)	18.9 (66.0)	19.1 (66.4)	20.3 (68.5)	21.5 (70.7)	22.3 (72.1)	21.7 (71.1)	20.7 (69.2)
Mean daily minimum °C (°F)	9.8 (49.6)	10.4 (50.7)	10.2 (50.4)	10.2 (50.4)	9.6 (49.3)	8.6 (47.5)	7.8 (46.0)	8.0 (46.4)	8.8 (47.8)	9.1 (48.4)	8.2 (46.8)	9.4 (48.9)	9.2 (48.5)
Average precipitation mm (inches)	68.0 (2.68)	82.0 (3.23)	98.0 (3.86)	114.0 (4.49)	67.0 (2.64)	51.0 (2.01)	35.0 (1.38)	34.0 (1.34)	58.0 (2.28)	85.0 (3.35)	97.0 (3.82)	80.0 (3.15)	869 (34.23)
Average relative humidity (%)	74	75	74	78	76	74	72	72	73	74	71	74	74
Source: FAO
