= Octavio Cordero Palacios =

Town and parish in Cuenca, Ecuador

Coordinates: 2°48′S 78°58′W

Octavio Cordero Palacios Santa Rosa (Catholic Name)
- Parish
- Interactive map of Octavio Cordero Palacios
- Country: Ecuador
- Province: Azuay Province
- Canton: Cuenca Canton

Area
  - Total: 20.4 km^{2} (7.9 sq mi)

Population (2010)
  - Total: 2,271
- Time zone: UTC-5 (ECT)

Octavio Cordero Palacios is a town and parish in Cuenca Canton, Azuay Province, Ecuador. The parish covers an area of 20.4 square kilometres (7.9 sq mi). In 2010, its total population was 2,271. The town is named after the Ecuadorian writer and inventor Octavio Cordero Palacios.
