= Santa Ana, Azuay =

Coordinates: 2.9361°S 78.9200°W

Santa Ana
- Parish
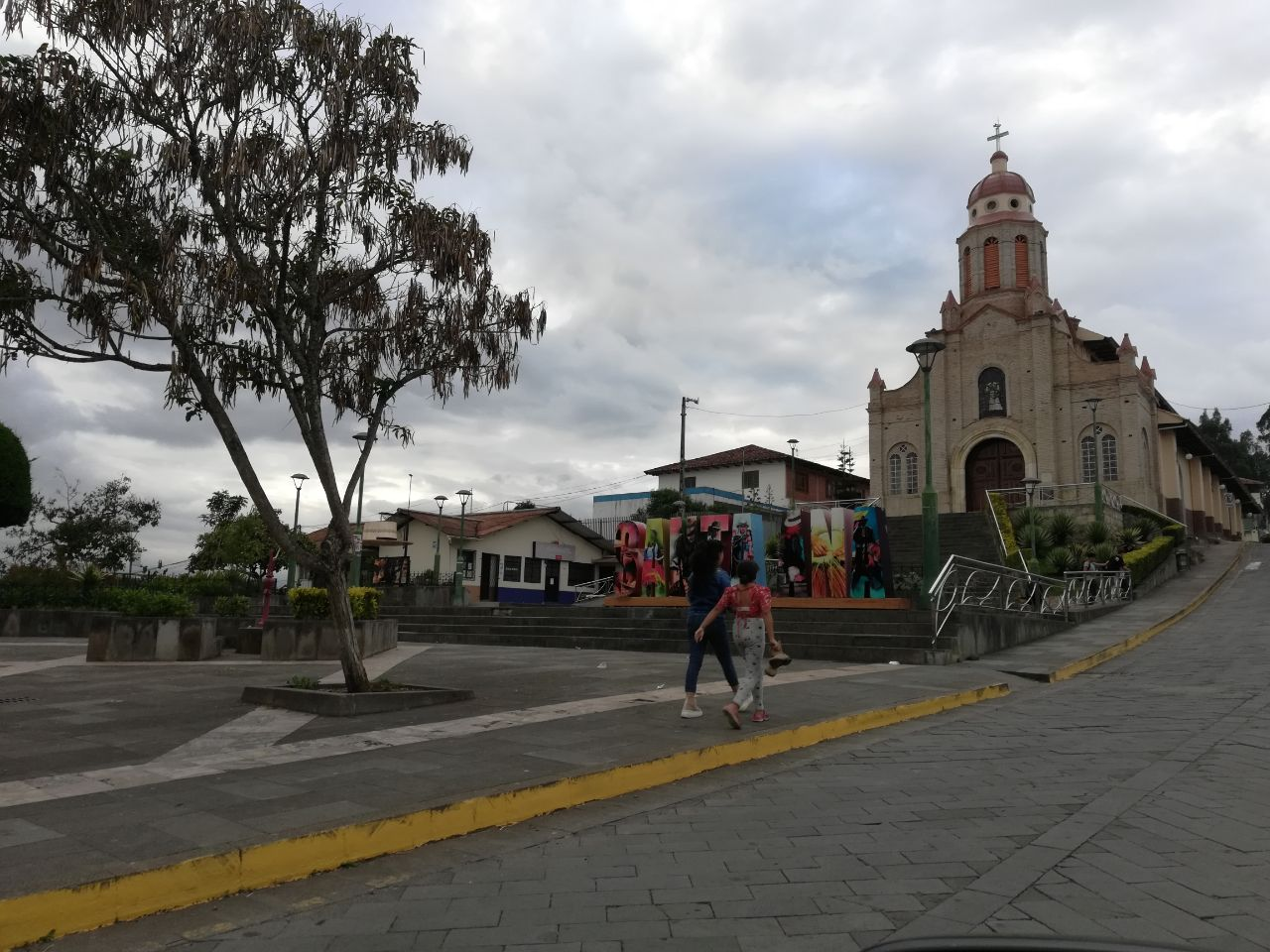
- Interactive map of Santa Ana
- Country: Ecuador
- Province: Azuay Province
- Canton: Cuenca Canton

Area
  - Total: 17.5 sq mi (45.4 km^{2})

Population (2001)
  - Total: 4,739
- Time zone: UTC-5 (ECT)

Santa Ana is a town and parish in Cuenca Canton, Azuay Province, Ecuador. The parish covers an area of 45.4 km^{2} and according to the 2001 Ecuadorian census it had a population total of 4,739.
