= Chaucha =

- Parish
- Location within Ecuador
- Coordinates: 2°54′S 79°24′W
- Country: Ecuador
- Province: Azuay Province
- Canton: Cuenca Canton

Area
  - Total: 130.2 sq mi (337.2 km^{2})

Population (2001)
  - Total: 1,633
- Time zone: UTC-5 (ECT)
- Climate: Cwb

Chaucha is a town and parish in Cuenca Canton, Azuay Province, Ecuador. The parish covers an area of 337.2 km² and according to the 2001 Ecuadorian census it had a population total of 1,633.
