= Cuenca Canton =

Cuenca
- Canton
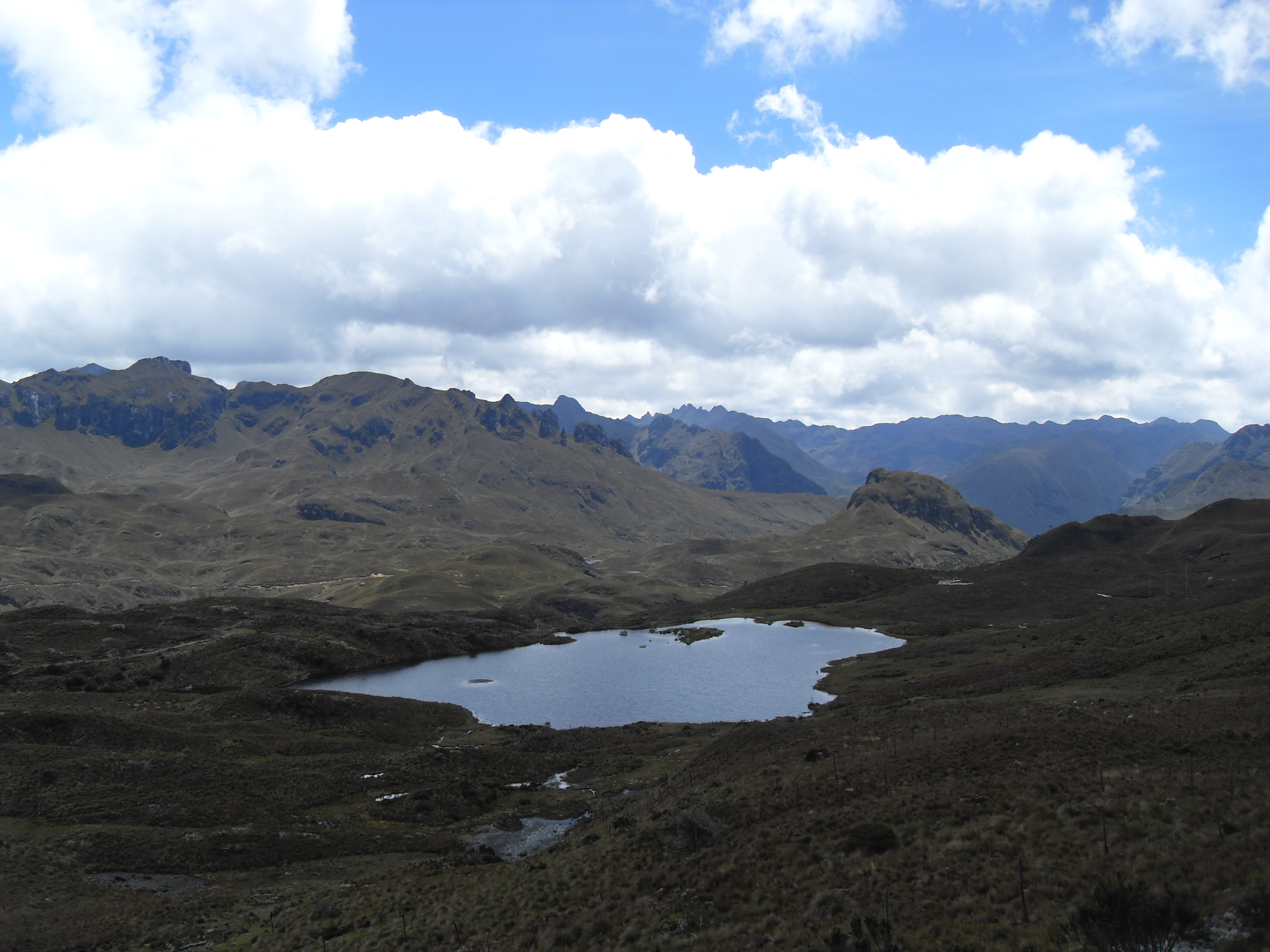
- Cajas National Park, Cuenca

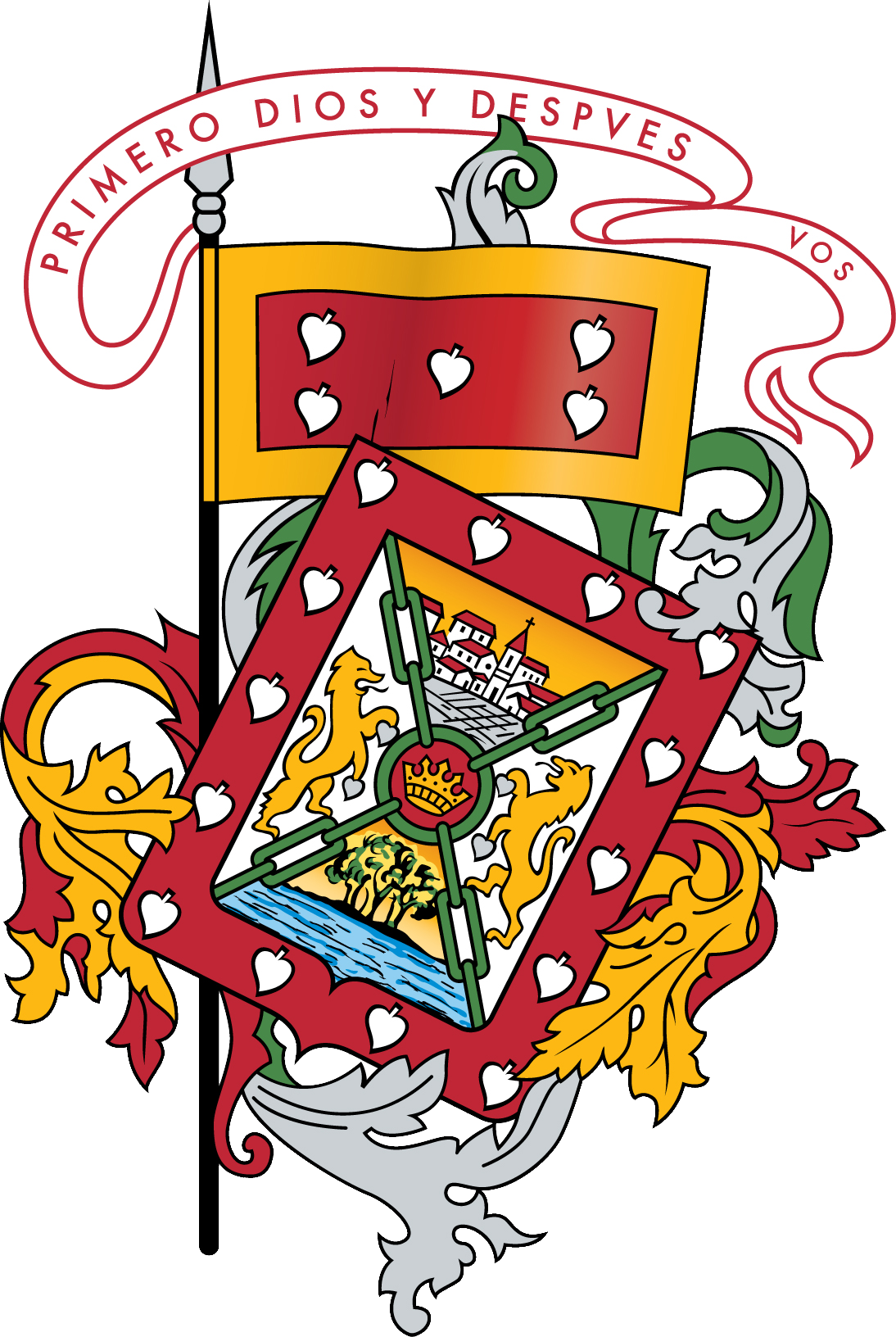
- Flag Seal

- Location of Azuay Province in Ecuador

- Cuenca Canton in Azuay Province
- Coordinates: 2°54′S 78°59′W
- Country: Ecuador
- Province: Azuay Province
- Capital: Cuenca

Area
  - Canton: 3,195 km^{2} (1,234 sq mi)

Population (2022 census)
  - Canton: 596,101
  - Density: 186.6/km^{2} (483.2/sq mi)
  - Urban: 361,524
- Time zone: UTC -5

Cuenca is a canton of Ecuador, located in the Azuay Province. Its capital is the town of Cuenca. During the census of 2001 the canton had 417,632 inhabitants and in 2010 it had 505,585 inhabitants.

== Toponymy ==
The city is named after Santa Ana of the 4 Rivers of Cuenca in honor of the city of Cuenca in Spain, the birthplace of the Spanish viceroy of Peru Andrés Hurtado de Mendoza, who was the one who sent Spanish Gil Ramírez Dávalos to fund the city, and the fact that, this place, in its geographical features are very similar to the Spanish city. In addition, the name includes the fact that four rivers cross it: Tomebamba, Tarqui, Yanuncay and Machángara. The rest of the name comes from the Spanish tradition of dedicating to the new cities a saint of the Catholic church, in this case Santa Ana.

== Demographics ==
Ethnic groups as of the Ecuadorian census of 2010:

- Mestizo 89.7%
- White 5.7%
- Afro-Ecuadorian 2.2%
- Indigenous 1.8%
- Montubio 0.4%
- Other 0.2%

== Division ==
The canton is divided into parishes. The urban sector of the city of Cuenca is formed by the following 15 parishes:

Urban parishes
1. San Sebastián	10. Huayna Capac
2. El Batán	11. Hermano Miguel
3. Yanuncay	12. El Vecino
4. Bellavista	13. Totoracocha
5. Gill Ramírez Dávalos	14. Monay
6. El Sagrario	15. Machángara
7. San Blas	
8. Cañaribamba
9. Sucre

The rural territory of the canton is divided into 21 parishes:

Rural parishes
1. Molleturo	12. Ricaurte
2. Chaucha	13. Urban parishes
3. Sayausí	14. Paccha
4. Chiquintad	15. Nulti
5. Checa (or Jidcay)	16. Turi
6. San Joaquín	17. El Valle
7. Baños	18. Santa Ana
8. Sinincay	19. Tarqui
9. Octavio Cordero Palacios (or Santa Rosa)	20. Victoria del Portete (or Irquis)
10. Sidcay	21. Cumbe
11. Llacao	22. Quingeo
