= Chiquintad =

- Parish
- Location within Ecuador
- Coordinates: 2°49′S 79°0′W
- Country: Ecuador
- Province: Azuay Province
- Canton: Cuenca Canton

Area
  - Total: 35.6 sq mi (92.1 km^{2})

Population (2001)
  - Total: 4,073
- Time zone: UTC-5 (ECT)
- Climate: Cfb

Chiquintad is a town and parish in Cuenca Canton, Azuay Province, Ecuador. The parish covers an area of 92.1 km² and according to the 2001 Ecuadorian census, it had a population total of 4,073 as at 2001.
