= Valle, Ecuador =

Valle
- Parish
- Location within Ecuador
- Coordinates: 2°57′S 78°59′W
- Country: Ecuador
- Province: Azuay Province
- Canton: Cuenca Canton

Area
  - Total: 16.5 sq mi (42.7 km^{2})

Population (2001)
  - Total: 18,692
- Time zone: UTC-5 (ECT)

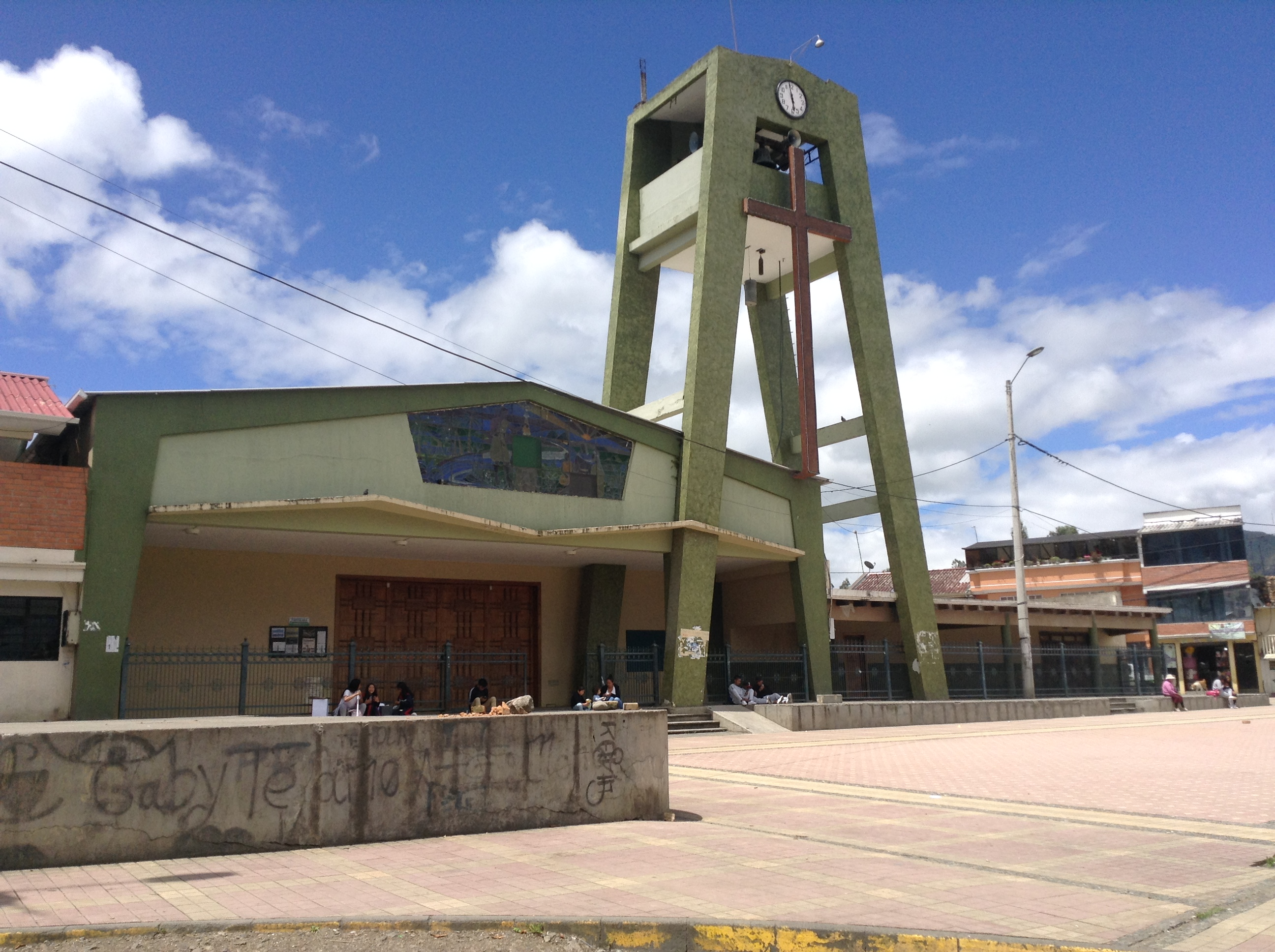
El Valle Parish Church, Cuenca, Ecuador

Valle is a town and parish in Cuenca Canton, Azuay Province, Ecuador. The parish covers an area of 42.7 km² and according to the 2001 Ecuadorian census it had a population total of 18,692.
