= Sayausi =

Coordinates: 2°52′S 79°04′W

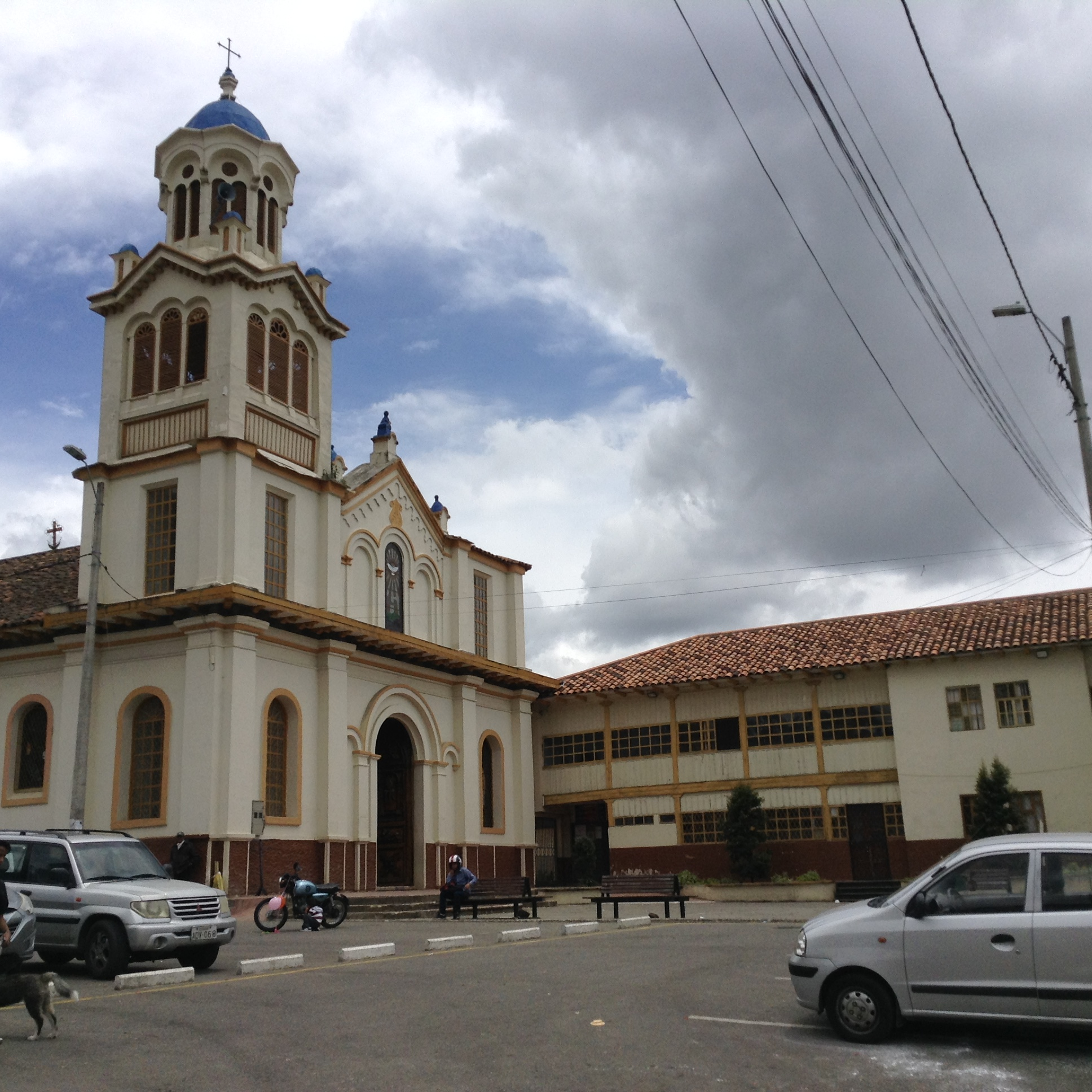
The Parish Church of Sayausí

Sayausi is a community located in the south of Ecuador, between Cuenca and El Cajas National Park. It belongs to Cuenca Canton.

== Crops ==
The traditional crops of Sayausi are corn, potatoes and some tropical fruits. The area is so close to the Colonial city of Cuenca that some of crops are sold on the many markets of the city. Farmers travel these distances to offer to the public a variety of vegetables and fruits.

== Tourism ==
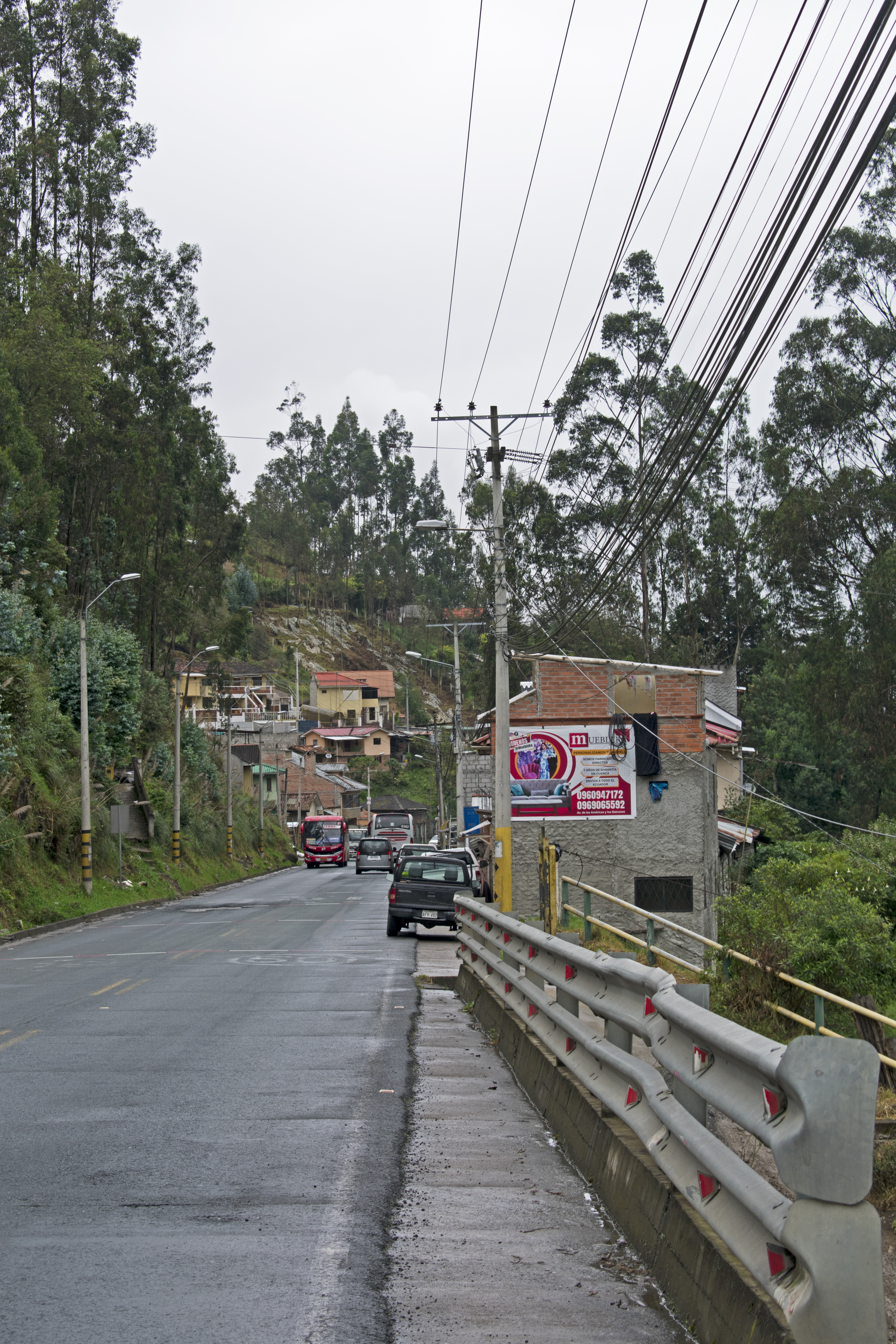
Road E582 in Gulag, the western quarter of Sayausi

In the 1990s this area was unknown, but new hotels and restaurants are opening and tourism has increased tremendously. Additionally, the strengthening tourism sector of neighboring Cuenca, Ecuador has increased tourism to Sayausí as well.

More recently, a number of local initiatives have been started in order to expand Sayausí's agritourism sector. These initiatives primarily focus on sharing the gastronomy and culture of this rural part of Ecuador.

== Traditions ==
Traditions include the preparing of the Incan chicha of Jora (a sour corn beverage) and preparing the national dish of cuy (roasted guinea pig). Many of the people continue the tradition of wearing the costume of the "Cholas Cuencanas" (Mestizos in Native clothes), a unique clothing costume in South America.
