= Tarqui, Pastaza Canton =

Coordinates: 1.523467°S 78.003450°W

Tarqui is an urban parish (parroquia) in Pastaza Canton, Pastaza, Ecuador.
