= San Joaquín, Ecuador =

San Joaquín
- Parish
- Interactive map of San Joaquín
- Country: Ecuador
- Province: Azuay Province
- Canton: Cuenca Canton

Area
  - Total: 71.5 sq mi (185.1 km^{2})
- Elevation: 8,635 ft (2,632 m)

Population (2001)
  - Total: 5,126
- Time zone: UTC-5 (ECT)
- Climate: Cfb

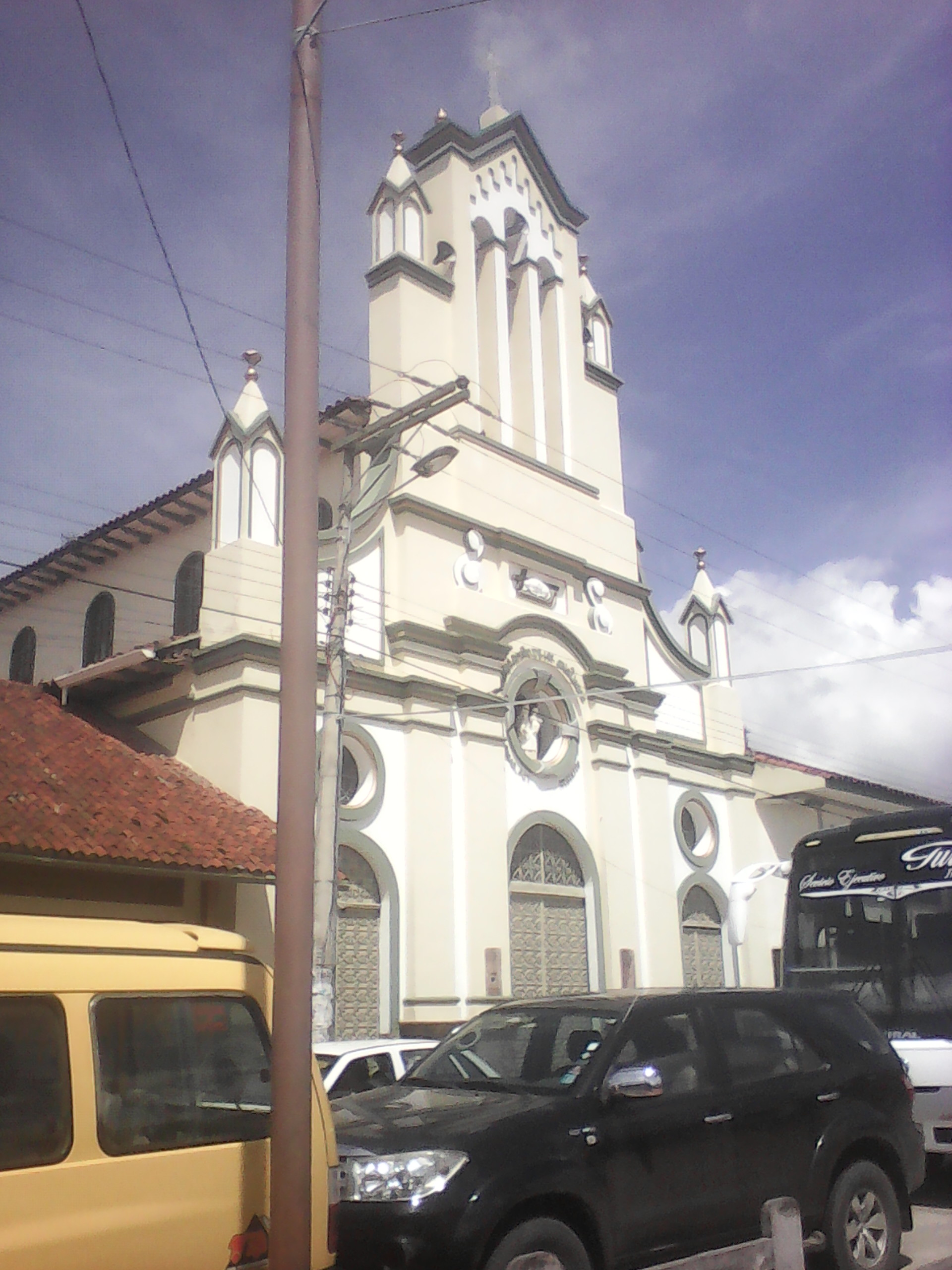
Church of San Joaquin

San Joaquín is a town and parish in Cuenca Canton, Azuay Province, Ecuador. The parish covers an area of 185.1 km² and according to the 2001 Ecuadorian census it had a population total of 5126.
