= TAME Flight 173 =

1983 passenger plane crash in Cuenca, Ecuador

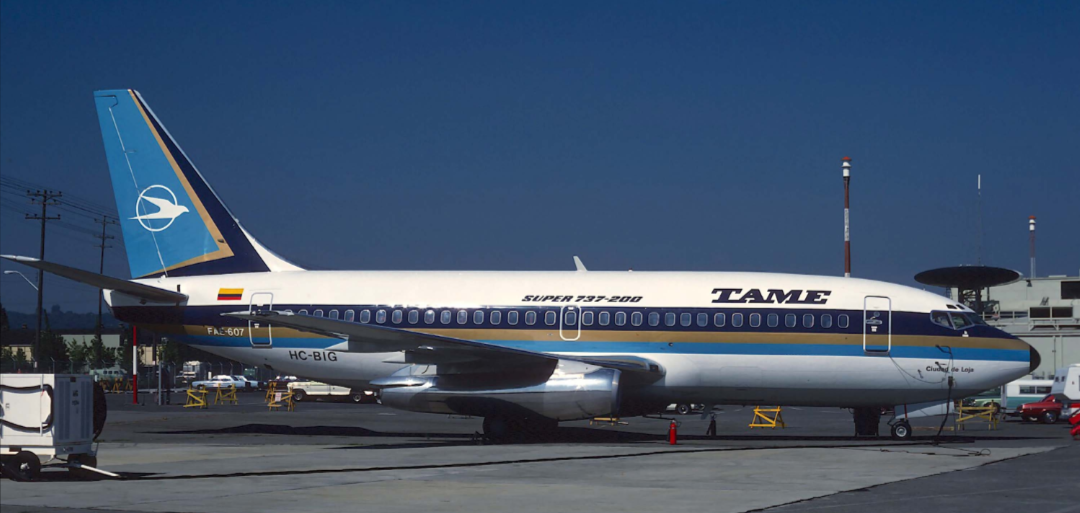
- HC-BIG, the aircraft involved in the accident, photographed in 1981

Accident
- Date: 11 July 1983
- Summary: Controlled flight into terrain (CFIT) due to pilot error
- Site: Bashún Hill, Ricaurte parish, near Mariscal Lamar International Airport, Cuenca, Ecuador; 2°51′55.3″S 78°56′59.5″W

Aircraft
- Aircraft type: Boeing 737-2V2 Advanced
- Aircraft name: Ciudad de Loja
- Operator: TAME
- IATA flight No.: EQ173
- ICAO flight No.: TAE173
- Call sign: TAME 173
- Registration: HC-BIG
- Flight origin: Mariscal Sucre International Airport, Quito, Ecuador
- Destination: Mariscal Lamar International Airport, Cuenca, Ecuador
- Occupants: 119
- Passengers: 111
- Crew: 8
- Fatalities: 119
- Survivors: 0

TAME Flight 173, a Boeing 737-200 operated by Ecuador's national airline TAME, flying on a domestic route from the now-closed Mariscal Sucre International Airport in Quito to Mariscal Lamar International Airport in Cuenca, crashed on 11 July 1983 into a hill during its final approach just 1 mile (1.6 km; 0.87 nmi) from its final destination, killing all 119 people on board.

The crash was the deadliest crash in the history of TAME, and it remains as the deadliest aircraft accident in the history of Ecuador. An investigation later determined that the flight crashed due to the flight crew's lack of experience on the aircraft type, which caused a controlled flight into terrain.

== Aircraft ==
The aircraft involved in the accident was a Boeing 737-2V2 Advanced, with Pratt & Whitney type JT8D-17 engines. It was manufactured in 1981 and made its first flight on 11 June of that year. It was given the test registration of N8283V and was re-registered as HC-BIG when it arrived in the TAME fleet in October of the same year. The aircraft was named "Ciudad de Loja" upon its delivery to TAME.

HC-BIG was the only Boeing 737 ever operated by the airline. As Vistazo magazine evoked, its acquisition was the product of an agreement between the previous government of Jaime Roldós Aguilera and the US to help modernize Ecuador's national aviation. Ironically and tragically, Roldós himself died in a plane accident in May 1981.

The plane was piloted by Captain Jorge Leonardo Peña Terán, a retired general who had previously served as the Commander of the Ecuadorian Air Force during the Roldós government earlier in the decade. He notably led the service in combat during the brief 1981 Paquisha War with neighboring Peru. After his discharge, he was entitled to a job at the military-run airline, which always had a job for retired generals. Terán thus joined the airline ten months before the accident, initially flying TAME's Lockheed Electra turboprops before transitioning to the Boeing 737.

Of the passengers, 103 people (95 passengers and all eight crew) came from Ecuador, 11 came from Colombia, and five from the United States. It was later revealed that before the trip, several passengers gave up their seats to others, including the then-Governor of Azuay province (of which Cuenca is the capital), Juan Cordero Íñiguez, who reportedly missed the flight after oversleeping in a Quito hotel.

== Flight history ==
On the morning of 11 July 1983, the aircraft took off from Mariscal Sucre International Airport in Quito for a domestic flight to Mariscal Lamar Airport in Cuenca with 111 passengers and eight crew members. The aircraft encountered foggy conditions during the final approach to Mariscal Lamar Airport, but the weather conditions of that day were reported as clear. The crew contacted the Cuenca control tower for permission to land the plane, which was granted.

During the final few minutes of the flight, the pilots were distracted during a conversation (reportedly discussing labor problems in TAME) and didn't know that the plane was flying dangerously low towards a mountain. Also, at the same time, they were experimenting with some of the aircraft's controls and systems.

Seconds before the plane hit the mountain and 1 mile (1.6 km; 0.87 nmi) from the airport, the ground proximity warning system (GPWS) activated, announcing an imminent terrain collision and sounding an alarm. The captain and first officer attempted to climb clear of the mountain by applying full power on the engines and making a steep climb, but it was too late. The jetliner scraped the peak of Bashún Hill (which overlooks the runway of Marsical Lamar Airport), exploded, and slid down into a ravine; there were no survivors.

Two minutes after the plane's signal was lost from the radar screen, Cuenca air traffic control (ATC) declared an emergency. The following day, search aircraft and rescue teams arrived at the plane's last known position. Because of the remoteness and the difficulty of access to the crash site, it took rescue personnel several hours to reach the site itself.

== Investigation ==
Initial fears of a possible sabotage were advanced by the civil aviation authorities after a radio station reported witnesses to a mid-air explosion. During the investigation, this was discarded due to lack of evidence. The civil authorities of aviation initiated an investigation, with cooperation from Boeing, Pratt & Whitney, and the United States National Transportation Safety Board (NTSB).

The investigation results concluded that pilot error was a direct cause of the crash. Several factors were identified: training of the pilots was not properly delivered by TAME for the Boeing 737-2V2 Advanced, the crew was not fully familiar with the controls of the aircraft, and the crew was distracted while trying to locate the runway in heavy fog. As a consequence, the plane went below the minimum safe altitude in a mountainous region, with the flight crew ignoring the voice commands of the ground proximity warning system until seconds before impact.

The training problem emerged due to a lack of compliance with the purchase conditions of the 737, as Boeing reportedly committed to training the pilots for six weeks in Seattle. In addition, the agreements stipulated that after the course, the pilots would begin flying accompanied for one month by an instructor appointed by Boeing. The following month, a foreign safety co-pilot approved by Boeing would join. Finally, only after completing 100 hours of flight would an Ecuadorian pilot be qualified to become commander of the 737. However, for unknown or undeclared reasons, this process was not followed through, and in March 1983 Captain Terán was sent to Brazil to learn to fly jet airplanes in a simulator for only three weeks. In the end, by the time of the accident, Terán had barely 30 flight hours on a Boeing 737.

The above-mentioned distraction factor was compounded by labor problems at the company, as the CVR is reported to have recorded the following quote from the conversation between Captain Terán and First Officer Sommerfeld.

Oh, Juanito! I tell you we're going from bad to worse, damn it. I am very disappointed, very disappointed. I want to promote a meeting [at the company] to finally tell them [the management] the truth, damn it. One can't continue putting up with so much bullshit. (Spanish: ¡Ay, Juanito! Le digo que vamos de mal en peor, carajo. Yo ando bien despechado, bien despechado. Quiero promover una reunión para de una vez decirles las verdades, carajo. Ya no se puede seguir soportando tanta pendejada.)

Finally, the airline's military nature, with its corresponding hierarchy, also influenced why Captain Terán, despite being grossly underqualified to fly the 737, had been flying the aircraft. After Terán came back from Brazil in March 1983, he sat on the left in the cockpit seat because, back then, a general could not be "demoted" to co-pilot.

== See also ==
- SAM Colombia Flight 501
- American Airlines Flight 965
- Air China Flight 129
- Mount Erebus disaster
- Smolensk air disaster
- TWA Flight 3
- Bhoja Air Flight 213
- Prinair Flight 277
- Avianca Flight 410
- TAME Flight 120
- Faucett Perú Flight 251
