= Tarqui, Cuenca Canton =

Rural parish (parroquia) in Cuenca Canton, Azuay, Ecuador

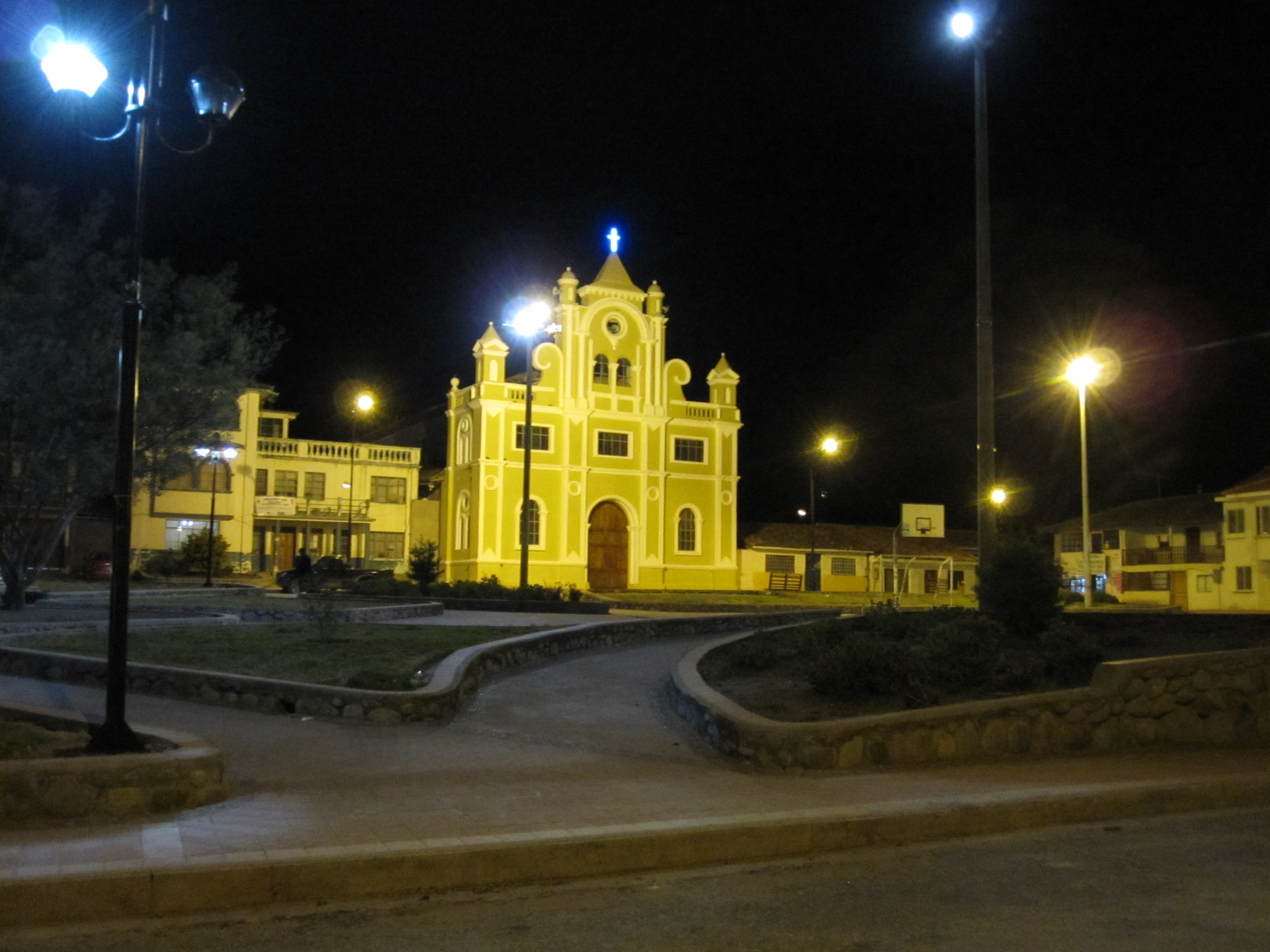
Main church on the plaza in Tarqui

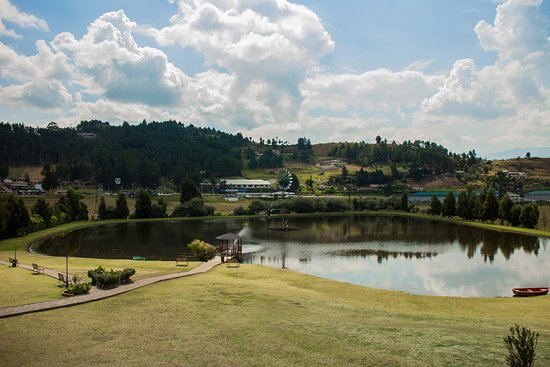
Event and show room overlooking the lake located in the rural parish of Tarqui in the city of Cuenca

Tarqui is a rural parish (parroquia) in Cuenca Canton, Azuay, Ecuador. Cuenca, officially known as Santa Ana de los Cuatro Ríos de Cuenca, is the capital of the Azuay province located in southern Ecuador. It is made up of 15 urban parishes and 22 rural parishes, including Tarqui. The parish is divided into 26 communities as follows.

It encompasses the communities of Atucloma, Santa Lucrecia, Tañiloma, Acchayacu, Bellavista, Las Américas - Estación, Gullanzhapa, Morascalle, Tutupali Chico, Tutupali Grande, Manzanapamba, El Verde, Chaullayacu, Santa Rosa, Chilcatotora, Parcoloma, San Pedro de Yunga, Chilcachapar, Cotapamba, Francesurco, San Francisco de Totorillas, Rosa de Oro, Santa Teresa, and Gulagpugro.

COMMUNITIES OF THE TARQUI PARISH
| Acchayacu | Cumbe Station | San Pedro de Yunga |
| Atucloma | Frances Urco | Saint Lucretia |
| Bellavista | Gulagpugro | Santa Rosa |
| Parish Center | Gullanzhapa | Saint Therese |
| Chaullayacu | Manzanapamba | Tañiloma |
| Chilca Totora | Morascalle | Tutupali Chico |
| Chilcachapar | Parcoloma | Large Tutupali |
| Cotapamba | Rose Gold | Zhucay |
| The Green | San Francisco de Totorillas | |

== Data ==
Coordinates: 3°00′49″S 79°02′04″W; Official Language: Spanish; Entity: Parish of Ecuador; Province: Azuay; Canton: Cuenca; President of the Parish Government: Galo Zhagüi; Subdivisions: 26 communities; Foundation and Parishization: October 18, 1915 (108 years old); Area: 135 km²; Average Altitude: 2628 m above. n. m.; Climate: Average annual temperatures of 12 °C to 20 °C; Watercourse: Tarqui River; Population (2010): 12,490 inhabitants, Density: 92.52 inhabitants/km²; Time Zone: ECT (UTC-5); Postal Code EC010168.

== History ==
The parish of Tarqui has a long history, dating back to the time of integration with the Cañari culture until the Republic, and later becoming a civil and ecclesiastical parish. Regarding ancient settlements, the Tarqui areas were occupied by the Great Cañarí Confederation, since there are ceramic remains that prove it. Later, its history also highlights the fact of the invasion of the Incas, who made their settlements in this sector, resulting in an important step to the Inca Trail. Furthermore, during the colonial era, the Spaniards and indigenous people who populated the city of Cuenca dedicated themselves to agriculture and livestock, so they chose to settle in more open places, but close to the city, so little by little They briefly occupied the territory known as Tarqui, previously under the name of Tarqui Valley.

The word Tarqui comes from a pre-Columbian word which has several meanings. According to Oswaldo Encalada's linguistic study, it is of Kichwa origin which means "step." It also states that its population belonged to the great Cañari confederation, which could be confirmed by the archaeological remains within the territory.

Likewise, according to historical archives that rest in the parish, the name of this town has its origin in a wind musical instrument called Tarquies in Cañari voice. According to documents by the Cuenca writer Octavio Cordero Palacios, the instrument was played by the Inca Atahualpa in a confrontation with the Spanish, at the time of the Conquest. On the other hand, Tarqui has contributed two significant events to the history of Ecuador, one of which was the work of the French Geodetic Mission, which arrived to verify the roundness of the earth, taking the Tarqui area as an important point for the work. Another important event was the Battle of Tarqui, where the place served as a means to stop the Peruvian military forces and their attempt to invade the city.

However, it was not until 1915 with the Agrarian Reform that the indigenous people requested the recognition of Tarqui as a parish, an act that was accepted by the Municipal Council of Cuenca based on the Territorial Division Law and the Municipal Regime Law of that time. Thus, on August 6, 1915, the inhabitants asked the council to civilly consider this place as a parish, and on October 18, in the session of the Cuencano Cabildo governed by Dr. Octavio Cordero Palacios, by decree No. 887 creates the new Parish of Tarqui. Thus leaving for granted the birth of the same with a territorial extension of 135 km^{2}, divided into 26 communities.

Currently, the parish of Tarqui is a place that has been modernized over time, it has basic services, works and infrastructure, in addition to having great natural beauty which makes peace and tranquility characteristic of this area.

== Geography ==
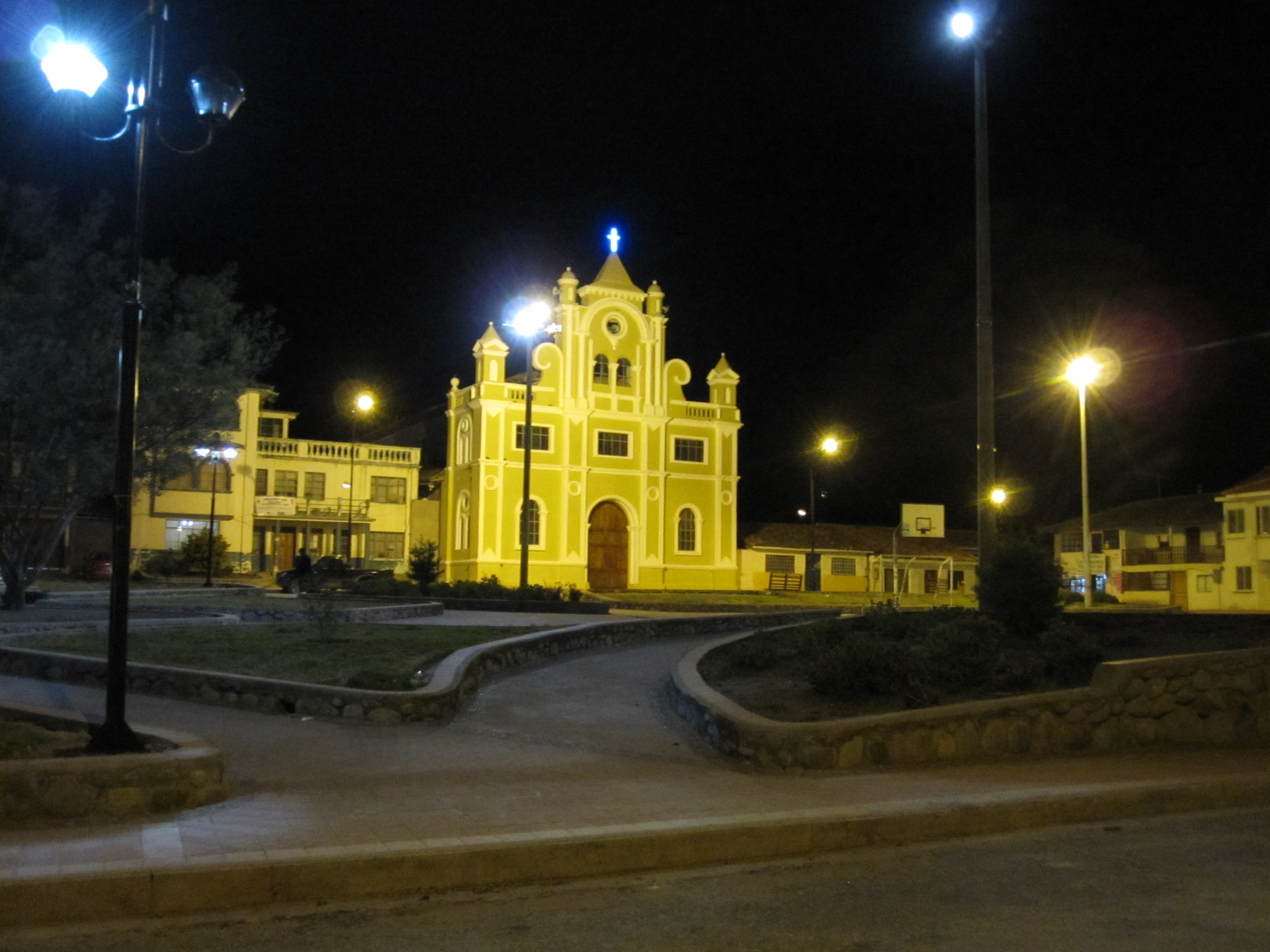
Tarqui central church (Iglesia central de Tarqui)

Tarqui is a rural parish located southwest of the Cuenca canton and has 26 communities; It is crossed by a main road called Cuenca-Girón-Pasaje, which serves as an interconnection with the city of Cuenca, the communities and from there to its parish seat and also with the rest of the southern cantons. At the same time, it has an area of 135 km^{2} or 15,098.61 hectares. The Parish of Tarqui is limited with other parishes in the Cuenca Canton in the following way.

- To the north: Baños, Turi and El Valle Parishes.
- To the south: Victoria del Portete and Cumbe parishes.
- To the east: Quingeo and Santa Ana parishes.
- To the west: Baños and Victoria del Portete parishes.

== Demography ==
The Tarqui parish has a total population of 10,490 inhabitants according to the last census carried out in 2010, of which are distributed among the 26 communities that reside there. Tarqui has a population of 10,490 inhabitants, of which 4,833 (44%) are men and 5,657 (46%) women. Thus, the majority of the population is made up of women, this phenomenon is due to the fact that the male population has migrated abroad; Proof of this are the large buildings that are presented in the parish center, many of these were built with remittances sent from abroad.

In addition to this, the population of Tarqui is made up mostly of a young population with a base age between 15 and 35 years of age, they constitute the economically active population of the parish of age to produce and contribute to its development. Thus, the economically active population that migrates are mostly men between 15 and 35 years old; they constitute an important source of income at both the parish, cantonal and national levels. Female migration is also strong in this parish, they are also sources of income for it.

On the other hand, the inhabitants of the Tarqui Parish are distributed in the 26 communities as follows.

| Community | Men | Women | Total | % Population |
|---|---|---|---|---|
| Acchayacu | 141 | 167 | 308 | 3.07% |
| Atucloma | 94 | 119 | 213 | 2.12% |
| Bellavista | 135 | 178 | 313 | 3.12% |
| Parish Center | 339 | 388 | 727 | 7.24% |
| Chaullayacu | 183 | 217 | 400 | 3.98% |
| Chilca Totora | 112 | 126 | 238 | 2.37% |
| Chilcachapar | 92 | 106 | 198 | 1.97% |
| Cotapamba | 189 | 205 | 394 | 3.92% |
| The Green | 111 | 140 | 251 | 2.50% |
| Frances Urco | 71 | 84 | 155 | 1.54% |
| Gulagpugro | 39 | 51 | 90 | 0.90% |
| Gullanzhapa | 466 | 578 | 1044 | 10.40% |
| The Americas | 130 | 147 | 277 | 2.76% |
| Manzanapamba | 46 | 57 | 103 | 1.03% |
| Morascalle | 127 | 149 | 276 | 2.75% |
| Parcoloma | 132 | 139 | 271 | 2.70% |
| Rose Gold | 67 | 88 | 155 | 1.54% |
| San Francisco deTotorillas | 67 | 75 | 142 | 1.41% |
| San Pedro de Yunga | 71 | 84 | 155 | 1.54% |
| Saint Lucretia | 99 | 107 | 206 | 2.05% |
| Santa Rosa | 104 | 116 | 220 | 2.19% |
| Saint Therese | 141 | 182 | 323 | 3.22% |
| Tañiloma | 155 | 185 | 340 | 3.39% |
| Tutupali Chico | 544 | 686 | 1230 | 12.25% |
| Large Tutupali | 539 | 574 | 1113 | 11.09% |
| Zhucay | 404 | 493 | 897 | 8.94% |

== Economy ==
Due to its geographical location, the economy of the Tarqui Parish is based on agricultural activities. Being an area with abundant resources in productive lands, grasslands, and large plains. Its main activity is agriculture, followed by livestock, mining, industry and manufacturing.

=== Agriculture ===
In Tarqui, 5 predominant crops have been identified. In first place is corn because it is a traditional crop and food, with an annual production cycle. Followed by beans, which are generally planted in association with corn and broad beans. In fourth and fifth place are peas, potatoes and cabbages. In some communities, products such as vegetables, barley, apples and geese are among the third, fourth and fifth places. The small surpluses are destined for sale, which represent 5% and 95% are used for self-consumption and seeds for future planting.

=== Livestock ===
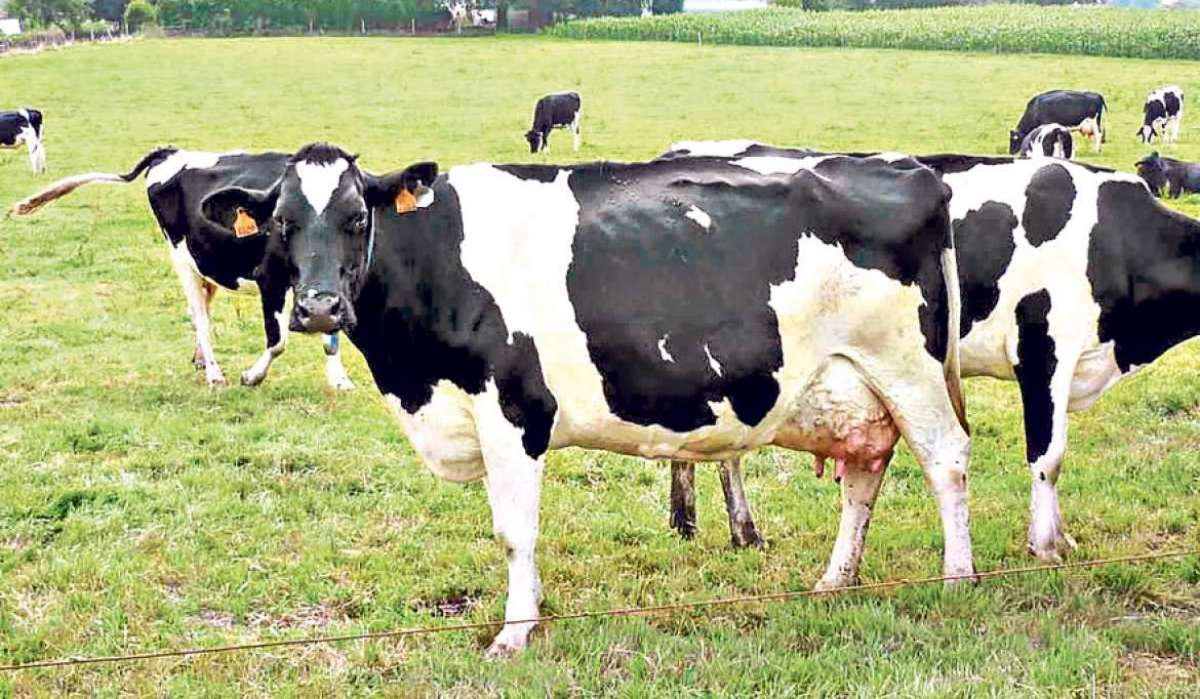
Livestock in Tarqui

The main species that are raised in the parish of Tarqui are cattle, pigs, sheep, guinea pigs, birds and others, among which cattle breeding stands out, as it is an alternative that generates income from the sale of both its derived as from the same animal. The main livestock is cattle for the production of meat and milk, followed by pigs, their meat is used in the preparation of typical dishes. In third place in preference are guinea pigs, in fourth place are sheep and finally birds raised in small quantities, either in sheds or outdoors.

The livestock of small producers is developed with a low level of technology in the production processes. The situation is different with the owners of large farms who have implemented new technology in the cultivation of pastures and in the maintenance of herds. Consequently, milk production is the main item within Tarqui's livestock production. The average production per cow among small producers is between 4 and 6 liters, while in medium and large farms, with some modernization, production averages between 8 and 12 liters. On large farms with the improvement of pastures, sanitary management and the implementation of machinery, you can reach up to 15 and 20 liters of milk per day.

=== Mining ===
According to the ARCOM Mining Regulation and Control Agency, in Tarqui there are 9 current concessions that are dedicated to mining in the area, which are: San Pablo II, Condor Loma de Tarqui, GPA Atucloma 18, GPA Tañiloma 27, San Pedro de Yunga, La Florida, Loma Blanca, Tarqui 1 and San Rafael.

=== Industry and Manufacturing ===
Tarqui has various small industries and artisanal establishments, activities such as wood extraction, manufacturing of concrete articles, manufacturing of footwear, manufacturing of curtains, production of balanced food, manufacturing of dairy products, among others. Despite not having a tax registry, it is known that in the parish there are 14 pants and textile clothing factories, some craft stores and until 2015 an embroidery workshop in the community of Tañiloma.

Additionally, with the support of the Parish GAD, associative groups have been formed that are producing personal hygiene items (shampoo and soap based on medicinal plants), environmental items, pickles, grape wines, blackberry wines, horchatas and candles. The current production is on a small scale, however, the population of the parish hopes to be able to improve in aspects such as the quality of the raw materials, the incorporation of technology in the production processes and the improvement of the presentation of the final product.

== Climate ==
Tarqui has a climate determined by the relief and other natural factors. It houses average annual temperatures of 12 °C to 20 °C. and a precipitation of 500 to 2000 millimeters, of which are distributed in the months of October to November and from February to May. Resulting in cold climates, being between 2600 and 380 m above sea level.

== Flora and fauna ==
=== Flora ===
In the Tarqui parish there are three life zones: Montane, high montane and paramo. The vegetation in each of these zones is varied. There is natural vegetation such as lichens, straw, mosses, chilcas, white elderberry, black elderberry, walnut trees, pencos, among others. others; There is a wide variety of ornamental species such as roses, carnations and large expanses of grasslands. Of the species recorded for the Tarqui parish, 12 are considered endemic to Ecuador. The species Monactis holwayae according to the IUCN is considered in danger of extinction, however in this parish it has been possible to observe several populations that are found on the edges of mature forest, intervened sites and river banks.

Tarqui, for the most part in surface area (51.65%), has a macro-vegetation corresponding to the Montano, which is located in the central area of the parish, followed in importance by the Montano Alto macro-vegetation (41.95%), which is located mainly in the eastern area and in part of the communities of Tutupali Grande and Tutupali Chico. Finally, there are the moors, which are located in the western area of the parish.

==== Forests ====
The total area of protected forests represents 26.32% of the entire parish of Tarqui, which means that those communities that are in this territory must make sustainable use of the resources.

=== Fauna ===
The parish is characterized by a diversity of animals, both wild and domestic. Among the wild animals you can find mammals such as rabbits, deer, and foxes. Regarding domestic animals, there are cattle, sheep, pigs, dogs, cats, horses, chickens, guinea pigs, among others.

== Education ==
Education is a human right of all people, which is not limited to age and diversity; It is a right in which the state is the main guarantor, but the family and society must also assume it as a right and as a duty, to participate in the educational process. It is also defined that education must respond to the public interest and establishes that “universal access, permanence, mobility and graduation will be guaranteed without any discrimination and mandatory at the initial, basic and high school level or its equivalent.” (Art. 26, 28 Constitution 2008).

In the Tarqui parish, 8,264 people, representing 87.81% of the population, know how to read and write; while 12.19% do not know how to read and write, being the most representative percentage in the population of women. Likewise, 3.85% have achieved higher university studies, represented by 181 professional men and 181 women, who reside within the Parish.

== Tourism ==
=== Frances Urco Hill ===
Frances Urco Hill (Cerro Frances Urco) It is a pyramid-shaped hill that served the French in measuring the quadrant and, in honor of them, it bears this name “French-Urco”. In this place there are ruins of a shrine to the Cañari goddess “the moon”. The Frances Urco mountain, named after the French Geodetic Mission, which carried out research on triangulations, to demonstrate through measurements the theory that the Earth is flattened between the poles and not equinoctial.

The Frances Urco hill is located in the Tarqui Parish Km 12 Panamericana Sur, from there you can see the beauty of the Tarqui valleys, to get to the site you must walk 640 wooden and cement steps, the hill is at 2,800 meters above sea level, in the surroundings there are delicate native flowers and large pine trees.

=== Kushi Wayra Tourism Center ===
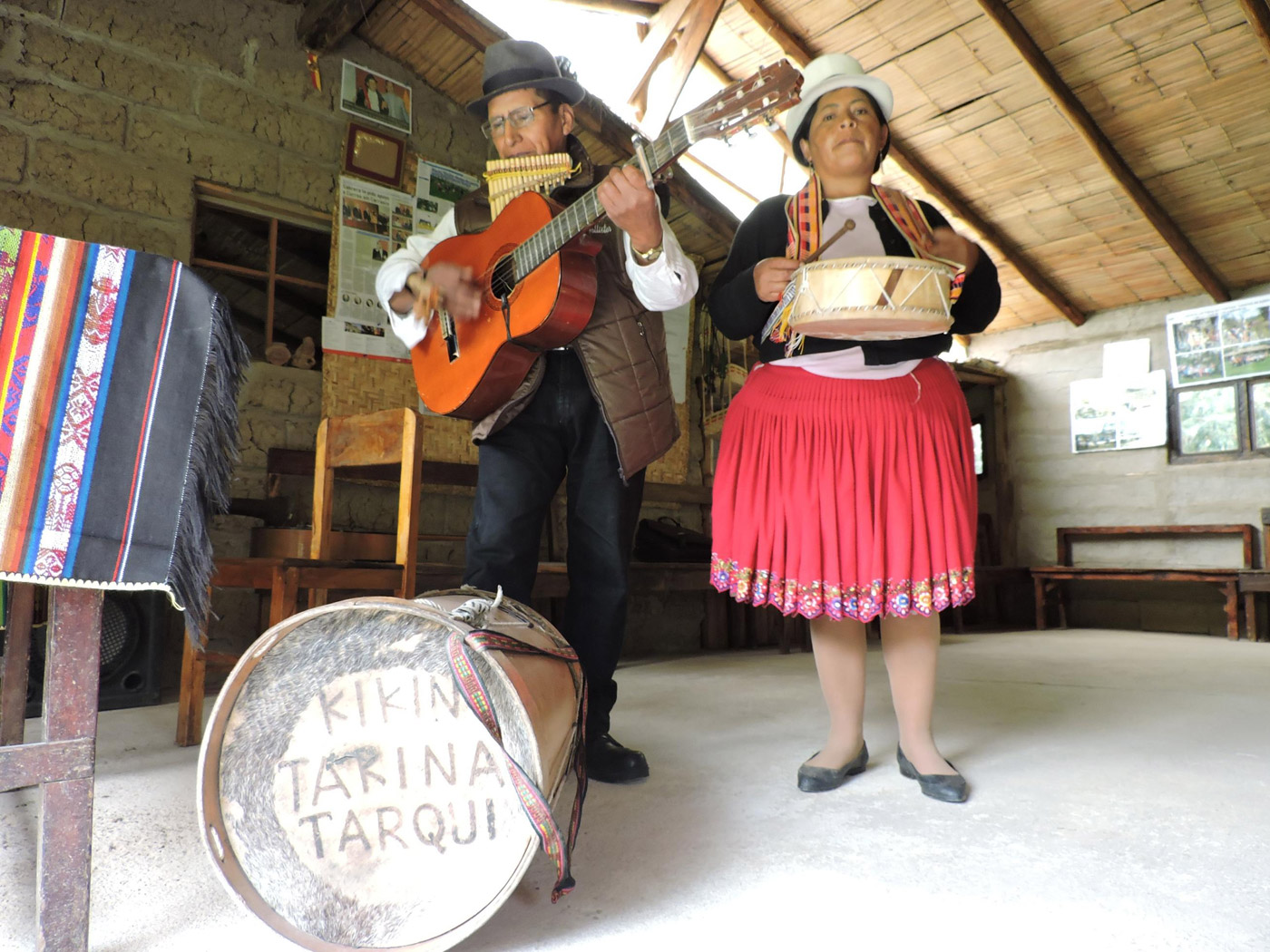
Kushi Waira Community

The Kushi Wayra Community Tourism Association (Asociación de Turismo Comunitario Kushi Wayra) belongs to the Jambi Runa Health Foundation (Fundación de Salud Jambi Runa). The Kushi Wayra Tourism Center (Centro de Turismo Kushi Wayra) belongs to the communities of Parcoloma and Chilca Totora, and its purpose is to provide a meeting space with the Andean Culture. This rural tourism association offers a tour to observe the Andean landscapes and explore what lies here as medicinal plants, gazebos, etc. In this place, the Kichwa-Kañari identity stands out with the exhibition of agricultural techniques, food preparation, cheese making, use of medicinal plants, making clothing with sheep wool, music and dances.

Visitors have the option of participating in the daily activities of the community's families: agricultural work, sheep shearing, wool spinning, preparation of typical foods and drinks. They also have the option of visiting the “Nukanchik Kawsay” cheese factory to learn about its production techniques and participate in a traditional lunch known as “pampamesa”.

=== Taita Carnival ===
In the Andean worldview, the mythological figure of Taita Carnival (Taita Carnaval) represents abundance and wealth. And the way to receive it among the families of their communities is with offerings of abundant food and the traditional chicha de jora. According to the belief of the indigenous peoples of Azuay and Cañar, a week before Carnival this character emerges from the interior of the mountains to joyfully experience this time of fertility, reciprocity and gratitude for the harvests.

In the Tarqui parish, the carnival festivities are celebrated with the rescue of traditional games, contests and gastronomy. Where the Taita Carnaval travels through different communities to bless agricultural products. It usually begins with a parade where all the communities and neighborhoods of this parish participate, then various activities are carried out such as masses, comparsas, the Mote Pata y Dulces Festival, the carnival guinea pig and breeding guinea pig contest, the pitima rooster game in where the bird is buried with its head exposed so that a ring can be strung on it, whoever achieves the goal gets the rooster and finally the celebration closes with several artistic presentations.

=== Yurak Allpa Zoo ===
The Yurak Allpa Zoo (Zoológico Yurak Allpa) is located 14 km from the city of Cuenca. This place was created as a refuge for wild animals, rescuing different animals abandoned or removed from their habitat for various reasons. In addition, it is home to approximately 40 species and 200 animals, such as tapir, ocelots, deer and a wide variety of birds such as eagles and parrots, as well as woolly monkeys, capuchins, squirrels, turkeys, toucans, among others. On the other hand, Yurak Allpa is open every day.
