= Victoria del Portete =

- Parish
- Nickname: La Vicky
- Location within Ecuador
- Coordinates: 3°3′S 79°3′W
- Country: Ecuador
- Province: Azuay Province
- Canton: Cuenca Canton

Area
  - Total: 80 sq mi (206 km^{2})

Population (2001)
  - Total: 4,617
- Time zone: UTC-5 (ECT)
- Climate: Cfb

Victoria del Portete is a town and parish in Cuenca Canton, Azuay Province, Ecuador. The parish covers an area of 206 km^{2} and according to the 2001 Ecuadorian census it had a population total of 4,617.
