= Chordeleg Canton =

Chordeleg Canton Choro De Oro
- Canton
- Flag
- Nickname: Chirigallos
- Location of Azuay Province in Ecuador.

- Chordeleg Canton in Azuay Province
- Coordinates: 2°56′S 78°46′W
- Country: Ecuador
- Province: Azuay Province
- Canton Established: April 15, 1992

Area
  - Total: 104.3 km^{2} (40.3 sq mi)

Population (2022 census)
  - Total: 12,197
  - Density: 116.9/km^{2} (302.9/sq mi)
- Time zone: UTC-5 (ECT)

Chordeleg Canton (Spanish pronunciation: [tʃoɾðeˈleɣ]) is a canton of Ecuador, located in the Azuay Province. Its capital is the town of Chordeleg. Its population at the 2001 census was 10,859.

== Demographics ==
Ethnic groups as of the Ecuadorian census of 2010:

- Mestizo 93.8%
- White 4.4%
- Afro-Ecuadorian 1.5%
- Montubio 0.2%
- Indigenous 0.2%
- Other 0.1%
