= Parishes of Ecuador =

Territorial subdivisions in Ecuador

The Parishes of Ecuador (Spanish: Parroquias) are the third-level administrative units of Ecuador. The Cantons of Ecuador are divided into parishes which are similar to municipalities or communes in many countries. There are over 1,500 parishes in Ecuador.
