= Fernando Daquilema =

Ecuadorian indigenous leader

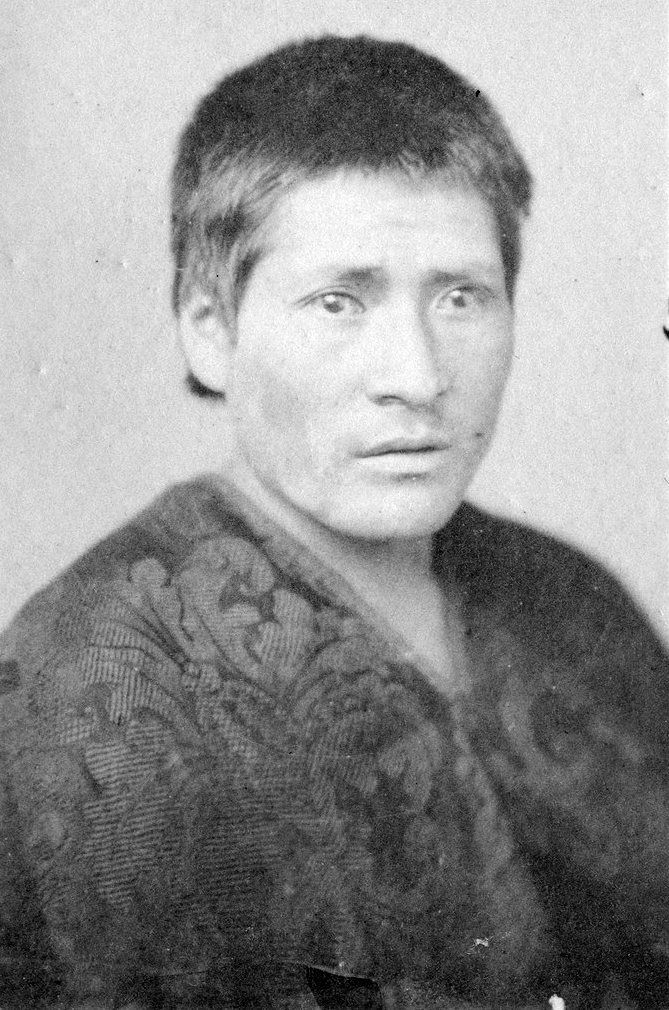
Fernando Daquilema

Fernando Daquilema Ruiz (June 5, 1848 in Kera Ayllu - April 8, 1872 in Yaruquíes) was an Ecuadorian indigenous leader, considered a hero for the struggle for the rights of his people. In 1871, he led an unsuccessful indigenous rebellion in Riobamba against the Ecuador government.

== Biography ==
Fernando Daquilema was born in 1849; his father was Ignacio Daquilema, who worked at the Tungurahuilla farm, and his mother was María Ruiz, both descendants of the Puruhá ethnic group. Daquilema married Martina Lozano; it is unknown if they had any children. During the 1860s, there was an overexploitation of the indigenous labor force in the jurisdiction of the Riobamba Canton. The parish of Yaruquíes, where the uprising of Daquilema took place, was one of those that suffered the most. Although there was a drastic reduction in its population between 1870 and 1873 but it had one of the largest proportional increases in the payment of tithes. He was sentenced to death and executed by shooting.

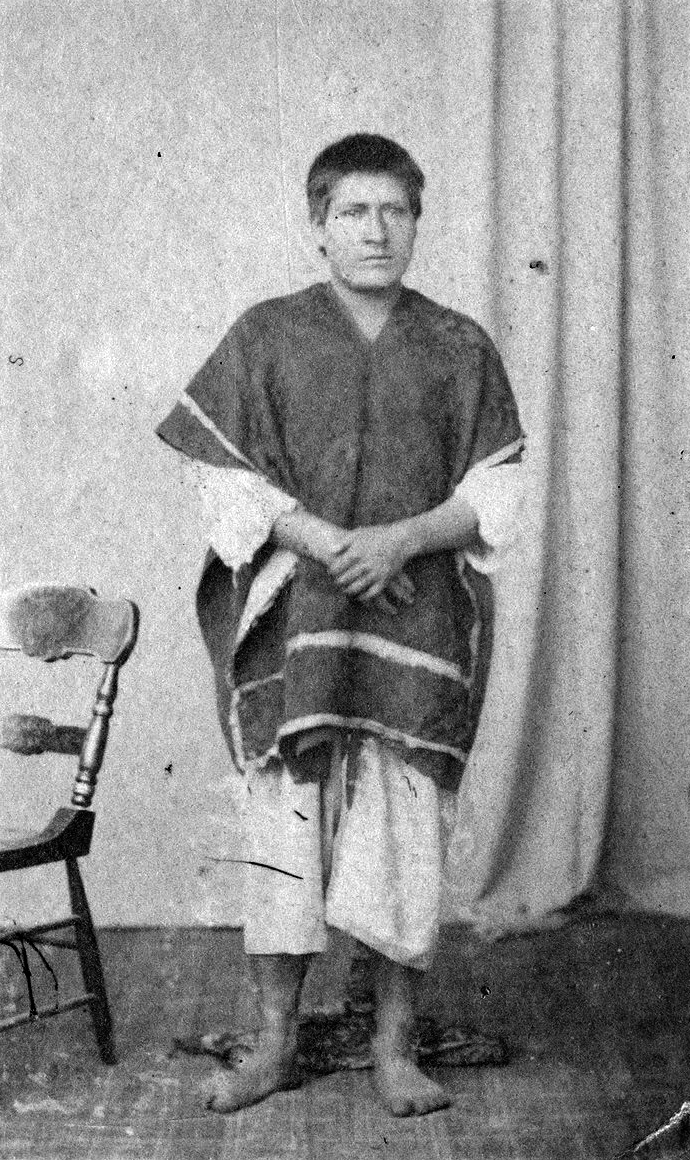
Portrait of Fernando Daquilema, taken by Leonce Labaure in 1872, Leibniz-Institut für Länderkunde Archive.

== Indigenous struggle ==
Payment of taxes and over-exploitation, made the inhabitants of the Cacha communities take revenge against a tithe man they considered arrogant and abusive. The tithe man was killed.

Fernando Daquilema gathered his people from the region and began to take some populated centers such as Yaruquiés and Cajabamba; but all of a sudden some indigenous people disbanded and then Daquilema orders to take Punín, which was under the control of the rebels led by Captain Manuela León, a native of the community of San Francisco de Macshi, today known as San Francisco de Asís. The governor of the province requested reinforcements that later arrived from Ambato and Quito. With the help of these forces he succeeded in taking back the town of Punín after it was abandoned by the indigenous. This was followed by a ruthless repression.

In December 1871, indigenous peoples’ outrage of the oppression they were going through, was high as the still existing collection of tithes reached its maximum. Fernando Daquilema, a descendant of the Duchicelas, led the uprising in Cacha (today the first indigenous parish in Ecuador). Rejecting the rule of the government, that served the interests of the white exploiters, they aspired to form a new government that considered indigenous people equal to the whites. Close to the Kápak-kucha lagoon (king's lagoon), in the small square of the chapel of El Rosario, which currently remains in the Community of Cachatón San Francisco (Hatun cacha), the indigenous people were summoned to a great assembly to choose a chief for their desired goals.

They attacked Cajabamba with 10,000 indigenous people armed with what they had. The women with stones, sticks, pins, huaraca or slingshot, poles. A fight to the death was established, they did not have good results, hundreds of indigenous people were taken prisoner. Later they reorganized and appointed Manuela León to lead the attack on Punín; Manuela with an army of hundreds of men and women faced the militias sent by the governor.

== Respect and Honors ==
On November 5, 2010, the plenary session of the National Assembly of Ecuador, by resolution taken unanimously, declared Fernando Daquilema and Manuela León to be the hero and heroine of Ecuador.
