= Manuela León =

Ecuadorian rebel leader

Manuela Leon
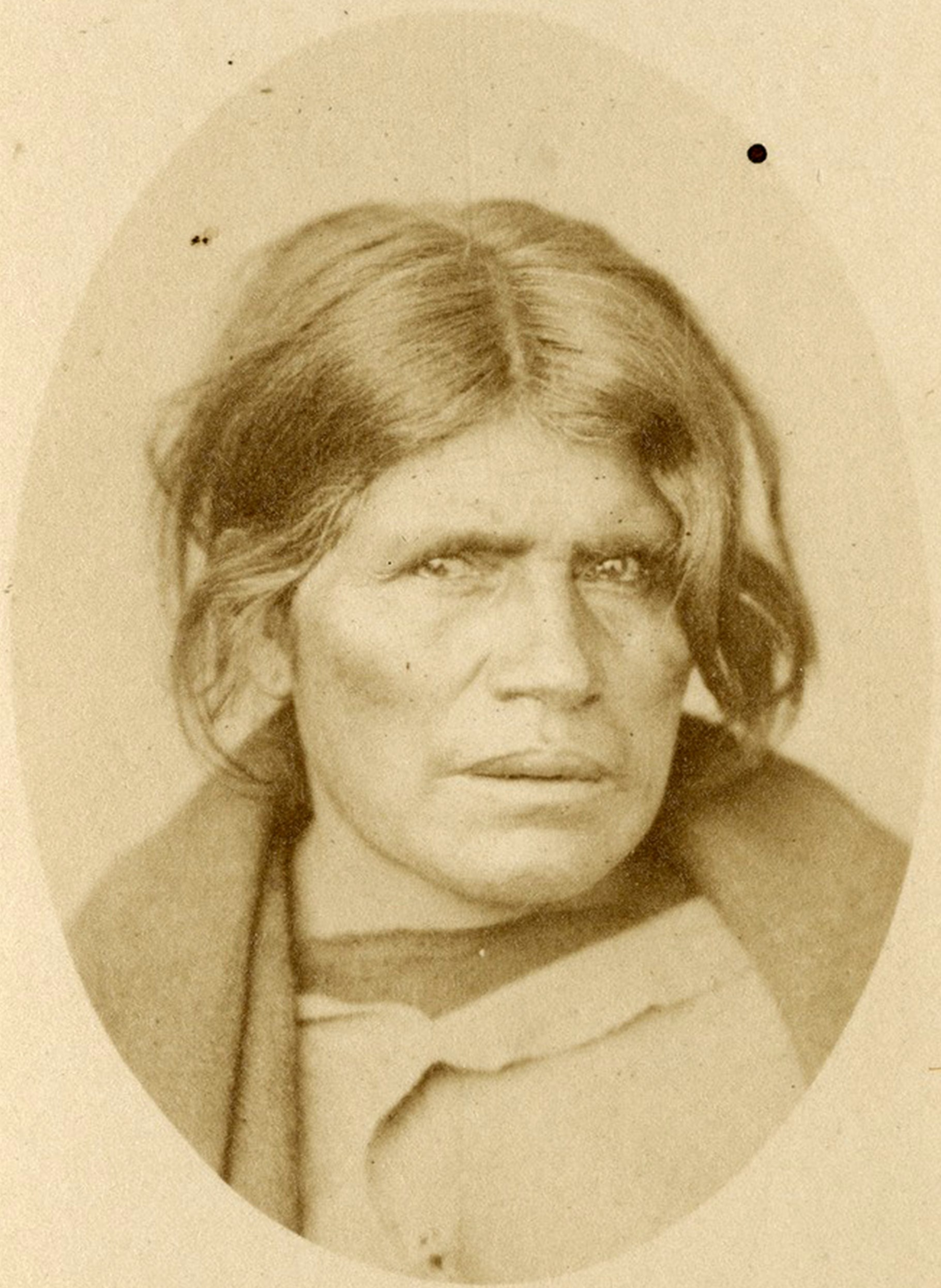
- Alleged picture on Manuela Leon in 1872

Personal details
- Born: c. 1844 San Francisco de Asís, Lauricocha, Peru
- Died: 8 January 1872 Riobamba, Chimborazo, Ecuador
- Occupation: Leader
- Profession: Revolutionary indigenous woman

Manuela León Guamán (c. 1844 – 8 January 1872) was an Ecuadorian woman who participated as a leader in the uprising of the indigenous people. She was proclaimed in 2010 a heroine by the National Assembly of the Republic of Ecuador.

== Life ==
She was born in the community of San Francisco de Macshi, today known as Cachatón San Francisco (Hatun Kacha), daughter of Hermenegildo León and María Guamán, her birth was registered in Punín, Riobamba parish, in 1844.

It was the year 1871 when of a large group of indigenous people tried to recover what they used to call the Inca Empire, Led by Manuela León (the rebel) and Fernando Daquilema (the newly proclaimed king).

Manuela León's ideals led her to lead actions in defense of equal rights for her people and to stop the abuse and oppression that came from the government of Gabriel García Moreno and to come face to face against the commanders of the enemy side.

She was shot for her actions on 8 January 1872 and died in Riobamba. It is said that when the firing squad asked if she had anything to say, she replied "Manapi", that is, "nothing" in her language.
