= Colta Canton =

- Canton
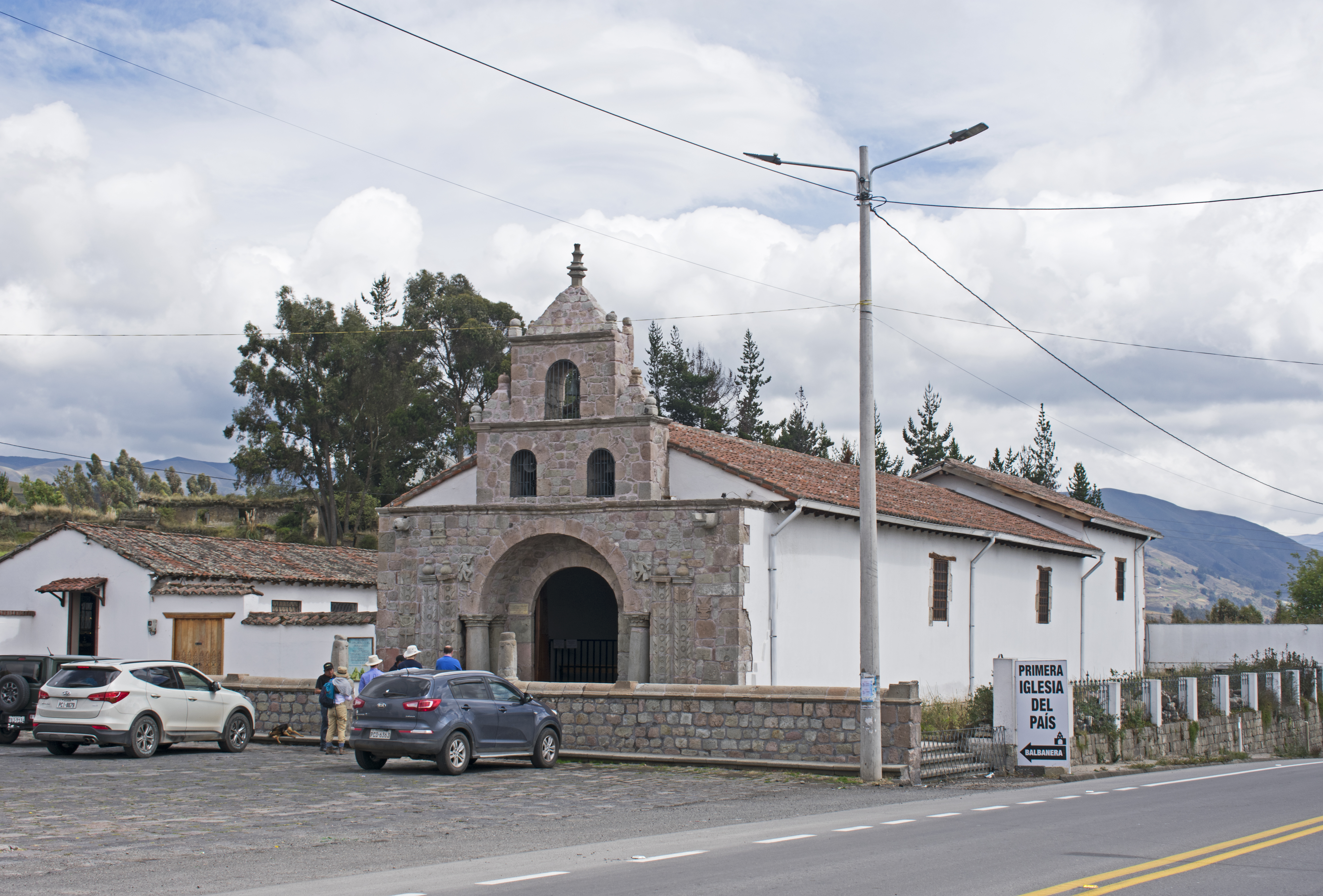
- Balbanera Church

- Location of Chimborazo Province in Ecuador.

- Colta Canton in Chimborazo Province
- Coordinates: 01°42′0″S 78°45′0″W
- Country: Ecuador
- Province: Chimborazo Province

Area
  - Total: 819.1 km^{2} (316.3 sq mi)

Population (2022 census)
  - Total: 30,468
  - Density: 37.20/km^{2} (96.34/sq mi)
- Time zone: UTC-5 (ECT)

Colta Canton is a canton of Ecuador, located in Chimborazo Province. Its capital is the town of Cajabamba. Its population at the 2001 census was 44,701.

== Cities ==
Besides the capital, Cacha is most likely included in the canton as well.
