= Oswaldo Moncayo =

Ecuadorian painter (1923–1984)

- Born: Oswaldo Moncayo; 10 September 1923; Riobamba, Ecuador
- Died: 4 April 1984 (aged 60); Quito, Ecuador
- Known for: Painter
- Movement: Realism

Oswaldo Moncayo (September 10, 1923 – April 4, 1984) was an Ecuadorian painter.

Moncayo (O. Moncayo) was born in Riobamba, Ecuador. As a child he moved to Quito, the capital of Ecuador, where he learned the art of oil painting. He started to paint as a child, and became a master when he was an adolescent.

Moncayo's artwork is realistic and it is distinguished by the harmony of elements and colors, and by the perfection of its minuscule details. Ecuadorian landscapes and seascapes were the paintings’ main themes. In minor scale, the artist also painted other themes such as horses, still lifes, and colonial scenes. His paintings capture customs, flora, fauna, and scenery that have been changing through time and modernity. In addition to their beauty and artistic value, O. Moncayo's paintings constitute a legacy to the Ecuadorian's culture and history. Moncayo's artwork has been acclaimed and demanded internationally. His paintings mainly belong to museums, galleries, and private collections in Ecuador, Venezuela, and the United States.

Oswaldo Moncayo died in Quito, Ecuador at the age of 60.

== Sources ==
- Moncayo's Web Page
- Moncayo Art Gallery
