= Oswaldo Muñoz Mariño =

Ecuadorian architect and painter

Oswaldo Muñoz Mariño (Riobamba, December 24, 1923 – February 20, 2016) was an Ecuadorian architect and painter.

== Biography ==
At fourteen years old, Muñoz Mariño lost his father, and moved with his family to Quito where they faced a tough economic situation. In that city he attended to the Instituto Nacional Mejía. In the 1930s, after the resignation of President Isidro Ayora in 1931, Ecuador went through seventeen governments in a decade. Artists and intellectuals belonged to two camps: one with Marxist socialist tendencies, and a conservative group.

At the Mejia School, one of the most notable learning institutions in Quito, Professor José Enrique Guerrero had great influence on Muñoz Mariño with his style. Muñoz Mariño's passion was also architecture. He painted buildings, evaluating their proportions, which helped in his becoming one of the most talented architects of Ecuador in recent decades.

He co-wrote a study titled Ecuador en gráficos (Ecuador in graphs), which he traveled to Guayaquil to present with the help of Benjamín Carrión. He was fascinated with the city, and having just graduated from high school, he got a job at Tucker Mc Klure, which was in charge of building the roads between Guayaquil-Salinas, and between Quito-Esmeraldas. This experience eventually defined his vocation as an architect. He yearned to move to Mexico to study architecture, and with the support of Benjamin Carrion and the Minister of War, he was able to do it.

In 1974, he worked on the project Huayra Huanca (El origen del tiempo), which was commissioned by the Mexican government in accordance with a proposal by Oswaldo Guayasamín. In 1962, he participated in a contest for the New City Hall building of Quito, for which he was awarded a prize. Unfortunately his design was never built. In 1962 and 1964, he exhibited his work in Mexico City and in its College of Architects. But in 1965, he won the first prize in the Annual Watercolor Exhibition in the College of Architects of Mexico, which opened the door to fame.

He has traveled almost 100 cities around the world, of which he has painted 74.

In 1999, he was awarded Ecuador's highest national art prize Premio Eugenio Espejo by the President of Ecuador.
