= Bolívar Echeverría =

Ecuadorian academic

Bolívar Echeverría Andrade
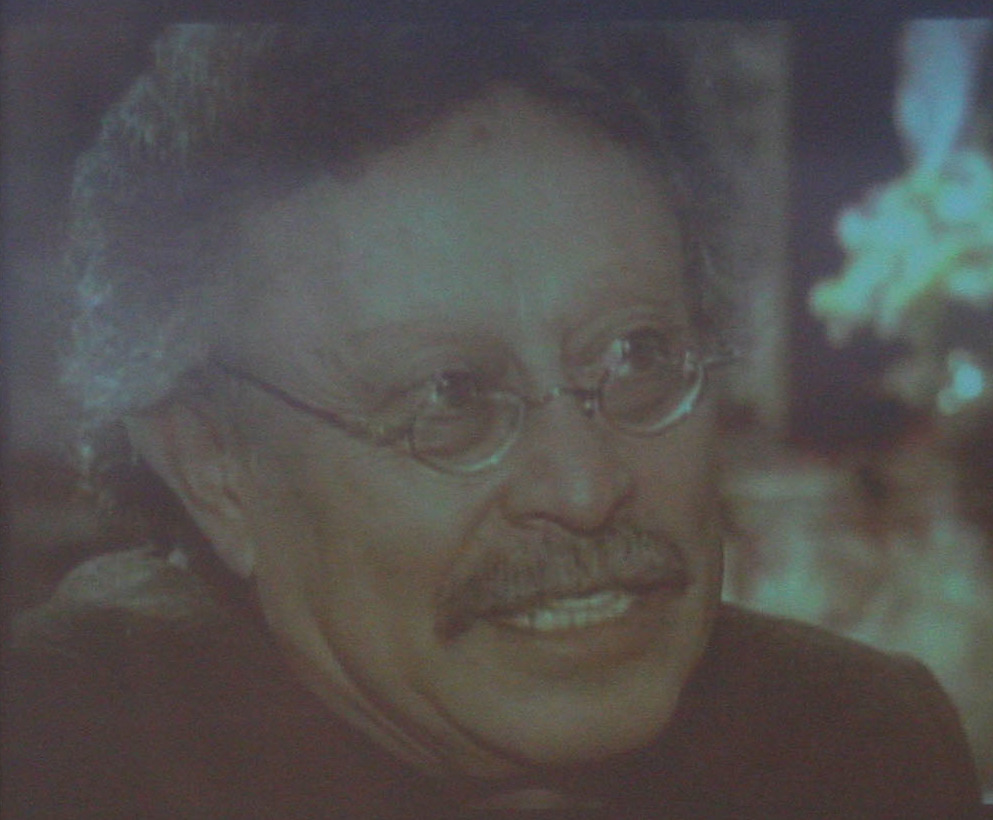
- Born: 31 January 1941; Riobamba, Ecuador
- Died: 5 June 2010 (aged 69) (heart failure); Mexico City, Mexico

Philosophical work
- Era: Contemporary philosophy
- Region: Latin America
- School: Marxism · Frankfurt School
- Main interests: Political economy, literary theory, cultural history, political philosophy, Marxism, history of art
- Notable ideas: Historical ethos; capitalist circulation; four ethoses of modernity: baroque ethos, realist ethos, romantic ethos, classical ethos; crisis of civilization

Bolívar Echeverría (31 January 1941 – 5 June 2010) was a philosopher, economist and cultural critic, born in Ecuador and later nationalized Mexican. He was professor emeritus on the Faculty of Philosophy and Literature of the National Autonomous University of Mexico (UNAM).

== Life and work ==
At a young age, his family moved to Quito. In this city, he studied first at Lasalle School and in 1955 his father transferred him to the Instituto Nacional Mejía, where his intellectual and political activity began. Afterwards, Echeverría moved to Germany to study at Free University of Berlin and then to Mexico to continue with his studies at the National Autonomous University of Mexico. He participated on the German student movement in the late 1960s, establishing friendship and long-lasting collaboration with its leaders, including Rudi Dutschke. In 1970, he started permanent residence in Mexico, where he lived as a translator, also continuing his studies on philosophy and economics. Later on, he developed a seminar on Marx's Das Kapital, which lasted six years and included intensive systematic readings of the book. Since then he became an academic of the Faculties of Philosophy and Economics on the UNAM, where he founded several magazines on culture and politics, such as Cuadernos Políticos (Political Notebooks) (1974–1989); Palos de la Crítica (roughly translated as Sticks of the Critique) (1980–1981); Economía Política (Political Economy) (1976–1985) and Ensayos (Essays) (1980–1988). He was also part of the Editorial Board of magazines like Theoria (Theory) (since 1991); and Contrahistorias. La otra mirada de Clío (since 2003).

His investigations where mainly (and broadly) concerned on: the ontological problems of existentialism, especially in Sartre and Heidegger; Marxian critique of political economy, focusing on the contradiction between Use value and Exchange value; and a contemporary development of critical theory and the Frankfurt School, including cultural and historical phenomena of Latin America. From this standpoint, Echeverría formulated a rigorous critique of postmodernity, with which he developed his theory of capitalist modernity and the baroque ethos, a form of cultural resistance in Latin America. He also wrote extensively on the fundamental contradictions of modernity as a civilizatory process and explored the possibilities of what he called an alternative modernity, in other words, a non-capitalist modernity.

Echeverría received several awards for his work, including: Premio Universidad Nacional a la Docencia (México, 1997), Premio Pio Jaramillo Alvarado (FLACSO-Quito, 2004) and Premio Libertador Simón Bolívar al Pensamiento Crítico (Caracas, 2006).

He died in Mexico City on June 5, 2010, of a heart attack, as a result of several blood pressure complications.

== Major works ==
- El discurso crítico de Marx, México: Era, 1986.
- Conversaciones sobre lo barroco, México: UNAM, 1993.
- Circulación capitalista y reproducción de la riqueza social. Apunte crítico sobre los esquemas de K. Marx, México: UNAM / Quito: Nariz del diablo, 1994.
- (comp.), Modernidad, mestizaje cultural y ethos barroco, México: UNAM / El Equilibrista, 1994.
- Las ilusiones de la modernidad, México: UNAM / El equilibrista, 1995.
- Valor de uso y utopía, México: Siglo XXI, 1998.
- La modernidad de lo barroco, México: Era, 1998.
- Definición de la cultura, México: Itaca, 2001.
- (comp.), La mirada del ángel. Sobre el concepto de la historia de Walter Benjamin, México: Era, 2005.
- Vuelta de siglo, México: Era, 2006.
- Modernidad y blanquitud, México: Era, 2010.
- Modernity and Whiteness, Cambridge: Polity Press, 2019.

== Works on Bolívar Echeverría ==
- Stefan Gandler, Critical Marxism in Mexico: Adolfo Sánchez Vázquez and Bolívar Echeverría, Leiden/Boston, Brill Academic Press, 2015. 467 pages. ISBN 978-90-04-22428-5.(Historical Materialism Book Series, ISSN 1570-1522; vol. 87.)
  - Paperback edition: Chicago, Haymarket Books, 2016. 467 pages. ISBN 978-1-60846-633-7.
- Stefan Gandler, Marxismo crítico en México: Adolfo Sánchez Vázquez y Bolívar Echeverría, México, FCE/UNAM/UAQ, 2007.
- Stefan Gandler: Peripherer Marxismus. Kritische Theorie in Mexiko. Hamburg, Berlin: Argument-Verlag, 1999. 459 pages, ISBN 3-88619-270-9.
