= Isabel Robalino =

Ecuadorian lawyer and politician (1917–2022)

Senate of Ecuador
- In office 1968–1970

Constituent Representative of Ecuador
- In office 1966–1967

Metropolitan Council of Quito
- In office 1946–1946

Personal details
- Born: Isabel María Josefina Robalino Bolle; 14 October 1917 Barcelona, Spain
- Died: 31 January 2022 (aged 104) Quito, Ecuador
- Occupation: Lawyer, trade unionist, and politician

Isabel María Josefina Robalino Bolle (14 October 1917 – 31 January 2022) was a Spanish-born Ecuadorian lawyer and politician.

== Biography ==
Isabel Robalino was born in Barcelona, Spain, where her family was residing while her father worked as a consul in Geneva. She completed her secondary education at the Instituto Nacional Mejía and higher education at the Central University of Ecuador, where former president Camilo Ponce Enríquez worked as an educator. In 1944, she graduated from the Central University as a lawyer, becoming the first woman to graduate the University with a degree in Law.

Following her graduation, Robalino was appointed a member of the Criminal Court of Ecuador. In 1946, she briefly held the position of Metropolitan Council of Quito, becoming the first woman to hold that office. Between 1959 and 1961, she was President of the National Court for Minors.

As a trade unionist, she was led to participate in the Revolution of 28 May, called "La Gloriosa." In September 1947, she personally directed the seizure of the Carondelet Palace from the military dictatorship of Carlos Mancheno Cajas. She also took several businessmen to trial, including future Ecuadorian president León Febres Cordero, to secure workers' rights. Because of her work, Robalino was selected by workers' organizations to represent them in the Constituent Assembly of 1966 and as a senator in 1968, becoming the first female senator in Ecuador. She would as a lawmaker introduce new legislation in favor of workers' rights.

Among the organizations Robalino founded are the Confederation of Catholic Workers, the Ecuadorian Institute for Social Development, the University Women's Youth, and the Mariana de Jesus Social Work School, among others. She turned 100 in October 2017, and died on 31 January 2022, at the age of 104.
