= Balbanera Church =

Church building in Colta Canton, Ecuador

Coordinates: 1°43′25″S 78°45′45″W

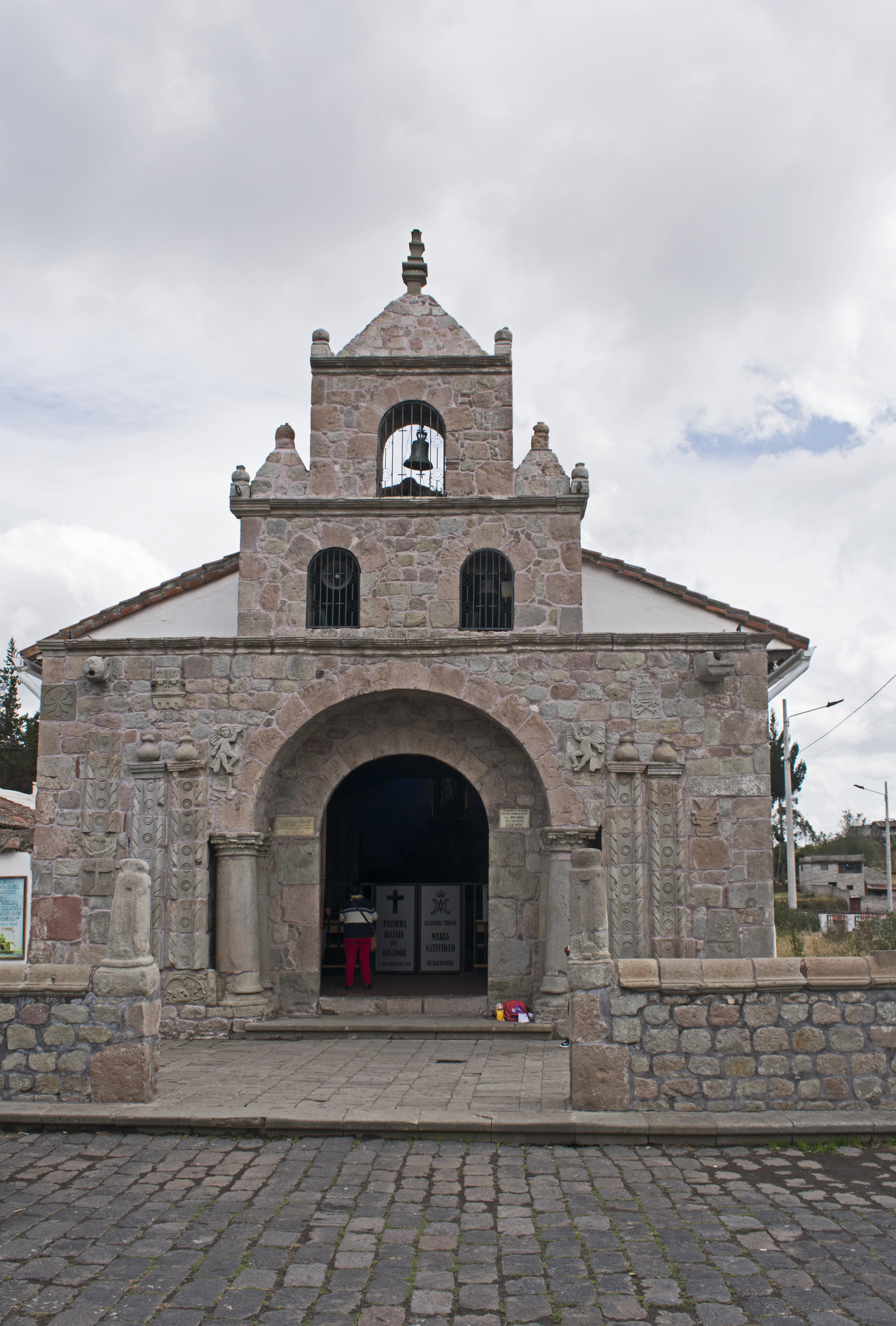
The main facade

La Balbanera is a church building in Colta Canton, Chimborazo Province. It was built in 1534 and is the oldest church in Ecuador.

The church was founded by a Spaniard Diego de Almagro. The location was hosen close to the Lake of Colta, which was a sacred place for the local inhabitants, and thus de Almagro thought this would be a good place to start the evangelization of the area.

The building is constructed of limestone blocks and clay. The original main portal in the style of American colonial architecture has been preserved. The area of the church is 360 square metres (3,900 sq ft).

The name originates from Our Lady of Valvanera, a devotion common in La Rioja. In particular, Our Lady of Valvanera is a patron saint of Sierra de la Demanda.
