= María Murgueytio =

Ecuadorian politician

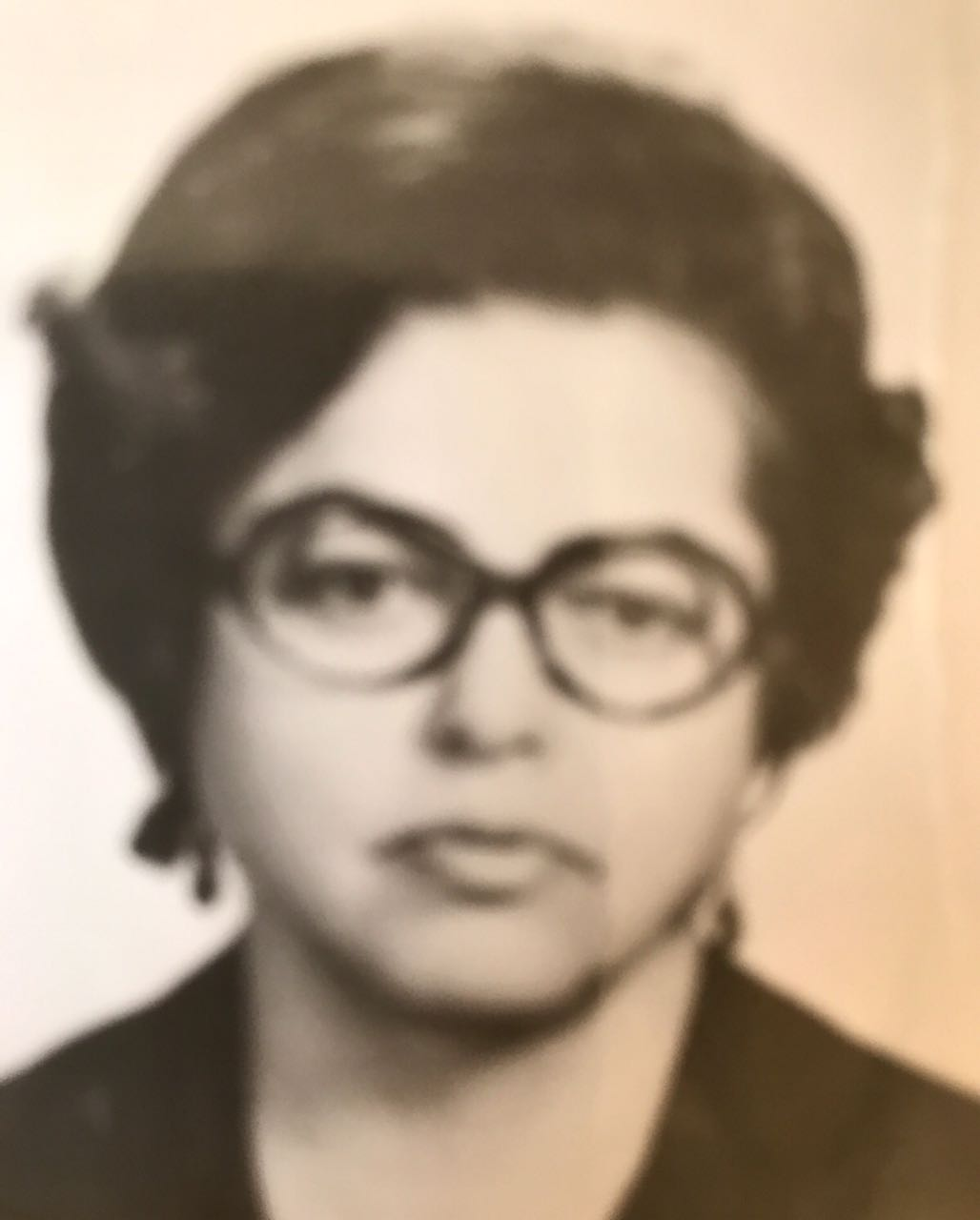

Mayor of Riobamba
- In office 1983–1984
- Preceded by: Edelberto Bonilla

Deputy Mayor of Riobamba
- In office 1978–1983

Personal details
- Born: María Murgueytio Velasco; 1927 Riobamba
- Died: 3 February 2016 (aged 88–89) Quito
- Occupation: Politician

María Murgueytio Velasco (1927 – 3 February 2016) was an Ecuadorian politician. She was the first woman in Ecuador to hold a mayoral office. She is also remembered for her work in women's rights in her term as mayor of the city of Riobamba.

== Biography ==
María Murgueytio was the first female graduate from Riobamba's Pedro Vicente Maldonado School and also the first woman to teach history there. She led the feminist movement of Chimborazo Province for women's rights during the era of the military dictatorship of Ecuador.

Murgueytio was elected during the 1978 Ecuadorian provincial elections to the Municipal Council of the City of Riobamba and thus designated deputy mayor. As a result of the resignation of Edelberto Bonilla, who left so as to be able to run in the 1984 legislative election, as Mayor of Riobamba, Murgueytio took his place as mayor in 1983. Her term was characterized by the construction and opening of the Yaruquíes parish, commemoration of Ecuadorian history and nationality via celebration of indigenous peoples, opening of new infrastructure, construction of plumbing to connect rural parishes to sewage facilities and clean water, and the guaranteeing of basic utilities to the people of Riobamba.
