= Cajabamba, Ecuador =

Villa la Union Kashapampa
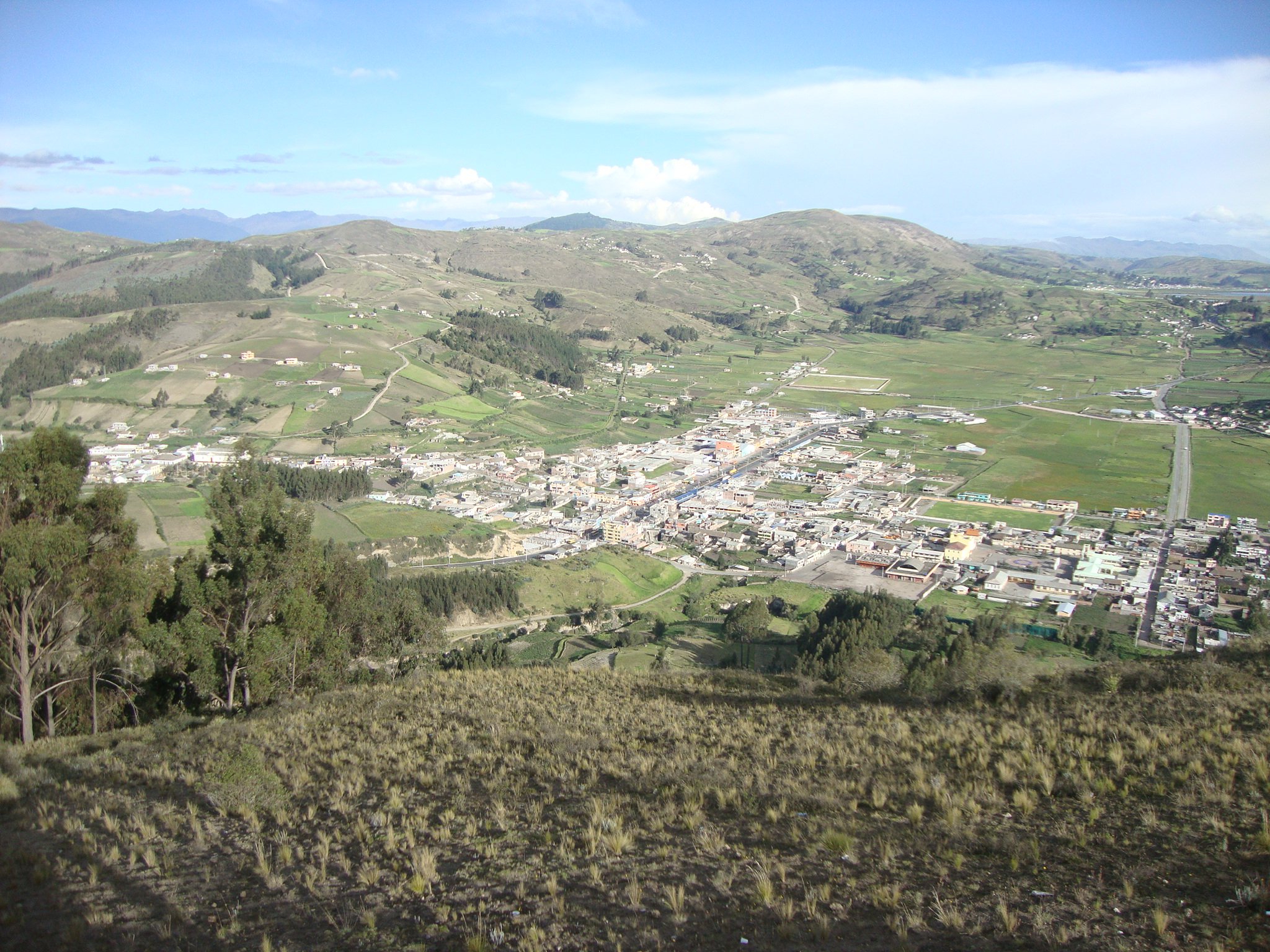

- Location within Ecuador
- Coordinates: 01°42′0″S 78°45′0″W
- Country: Ecuador
- Province: Chimborazo Province
- Canton: Colta Canton

Government
  - Mayor: Pedro Curichumbi Yupangui

Area
  - Total: 1.95 km^{2} (0.75 sq mi)
- Elevation: 3,212 m (10,538 ft)

Population (2022 census)
  - Total: 2,785
  - Density: 1,430/km^{2} (3,700/sq mi)
- Time zone: ECT

Cajabamba (Villa la Unión) is a location in the Chimborazo Province, Ecuador. It is the seat of the Colta Canton.

The village of Cajabamba (Kichwa: Kashapampa, "thorn plain") is situated in a fertile arable valley in Colta Canton, Chimborazo Province (Chimborazo = "snows on the other side"). It is unknown when the valley was first inhabited but it is known to have been settled in pre-Incan times as the city of Liribamba, the capital of the ancient Puruhá people. As the Incan empire expanded, the region became an area of conquest and was fully under the control of the Inca by the time of Wayna Qhapaq. After the capture and subsequent murder of his son and successor Atahualpa in Cajamarca, resistance to the conquista centered on the Incan general Rumiñawi, who withdrew his troops to the region. After a drawn-out series of engagements with the conquistadors, who allied with the Cañari (recently conquered Incan subjects), Rumiñawi, faced with the prospect of near-certain defeat, ordered the city of Liribamba burned and the treasures of the Incas hidden or destroyed.

Within the month (August 1534), Spanish conquistador Diego de Almagro founded a new city on the ashes of Liribamba which he named Santiago de Quito, the first city founded by the Spanish. By the end of the year, Incan resistance had collapsed, culminating in a battle at the volcanic mountain Chimborazo, and Rumiñahui was captured. Soon after, the city of Quito was moved to its current location. The city in the valley was renamed by its founders Villa de Riobamba, which means "plain on the journey" (possibly referring to its centrality).

The village was destroyed in a massive 8.3 magnitude earthquake in 1797 and moved to its current location 20 km away. (An important cavalry battle known as the Combate de Tapi was fought here in 1822 during the Independence War). The small populations remaining at the sites lived in the parishes known as Cajabamba and Sicalpa (also Cicalpa). In 1884, the parishes broke from the metropolitan umbrella of Riobamba and joined together to form Villa La Unión, which is the formal name of the village today known as Cajabamba.
