= Cacha =

Town and district in Chimborazo Province, Ecuador

Coordinates: 1°43′S 78°42′W

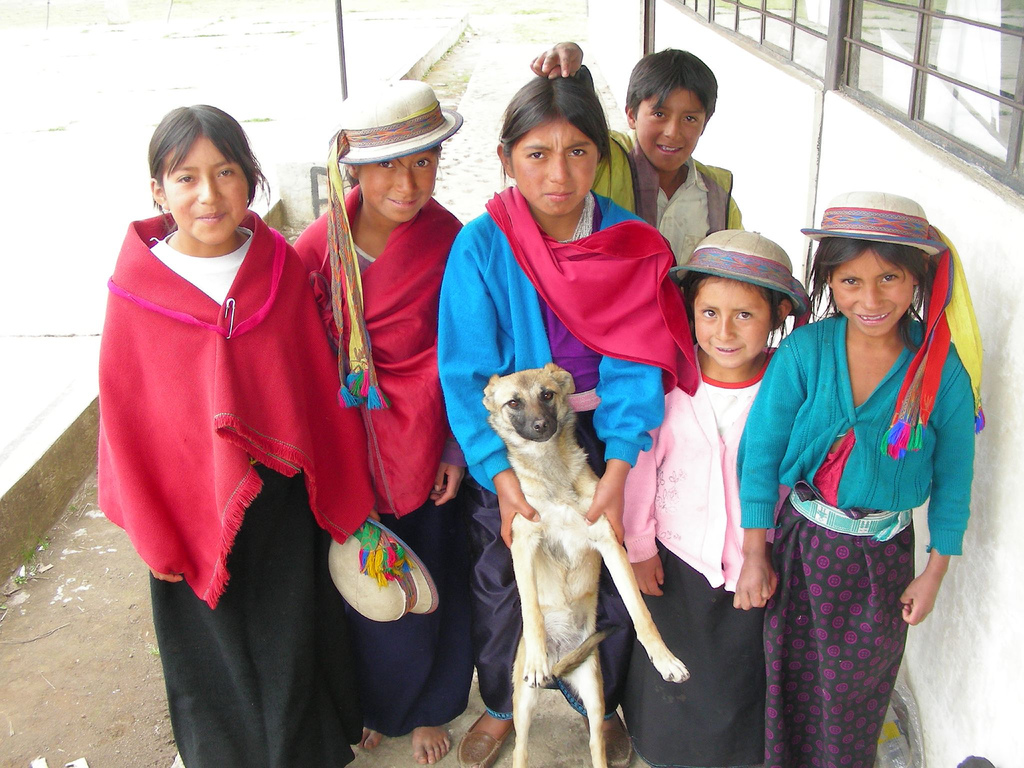
Children and a dog in Cacha

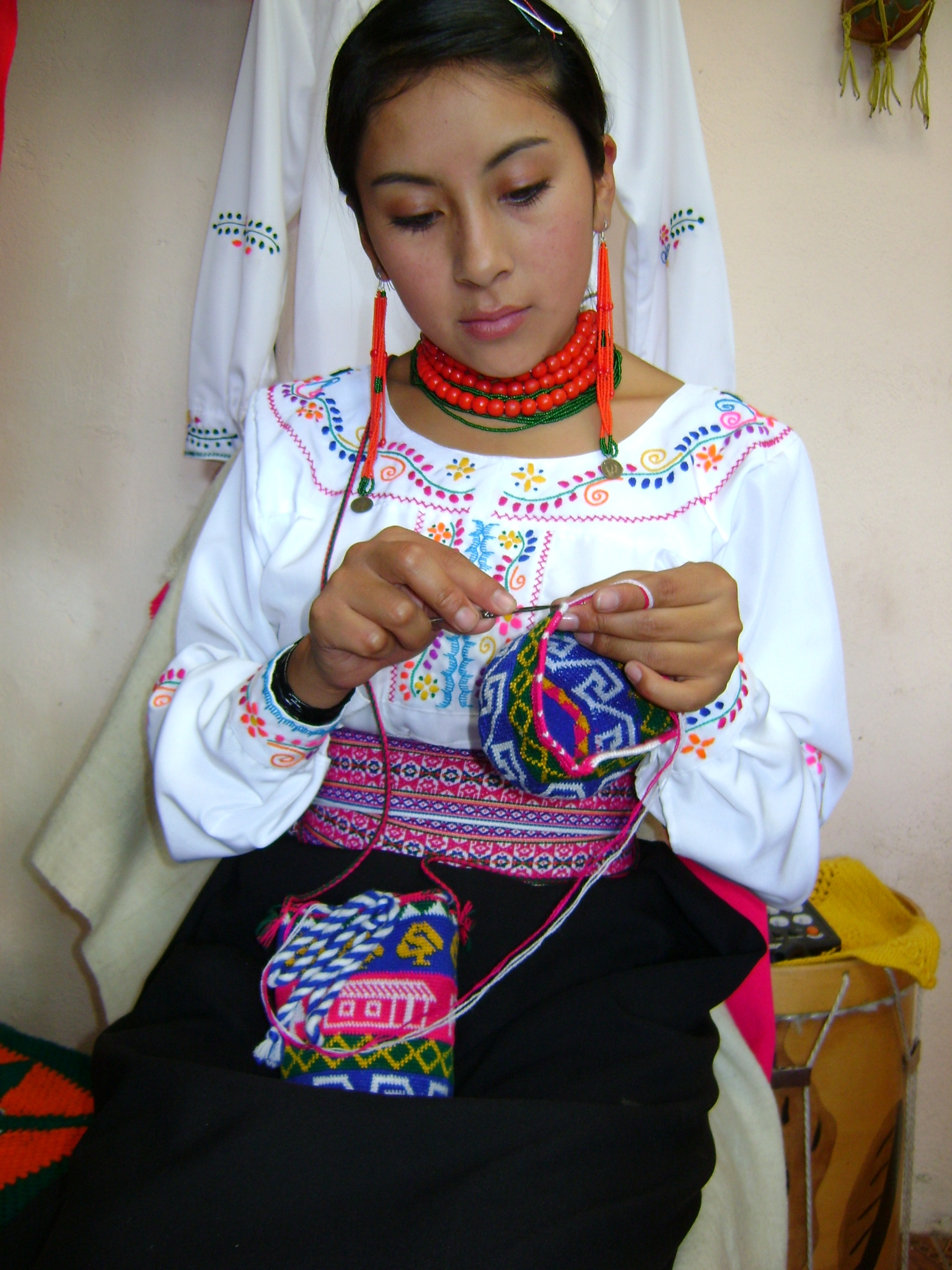
Woman from Cacha

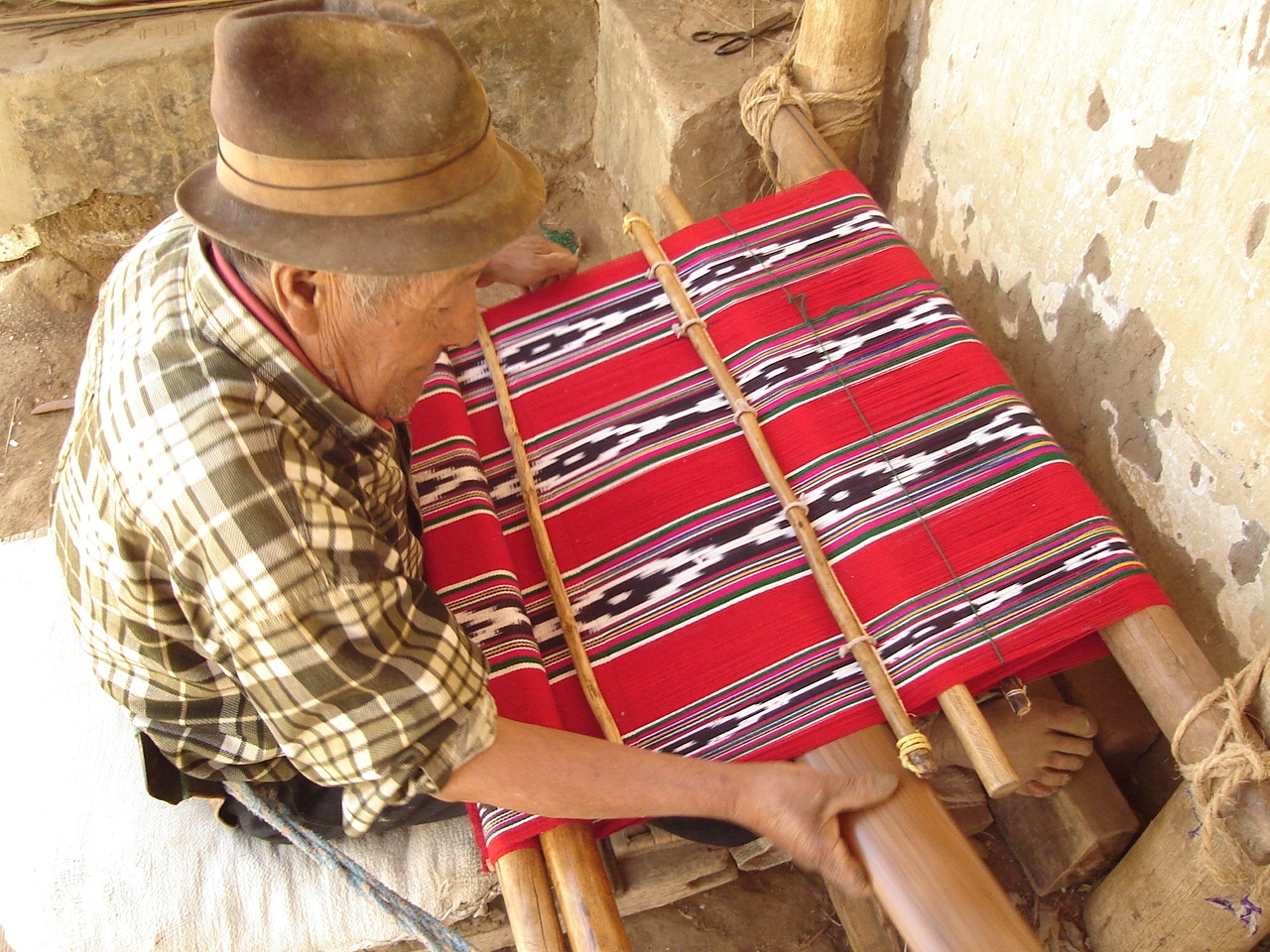
Weaver in Cacha

Cacha is a town and also a district in Chimborazo Province, Ecuador. It is home to people of the Puruhá ethnicity. The rural area is agricultural and is known for its indigenous people and artisanal crafts. Cacha is located at latitude -1.7 / -1° 42' 0.0" and longitude -78.6666667 / -78° 40' 0.0012". A local group, Duchicelas, is active in maintaining the area's musical traditions. Cacha was home to Fernando Daquilema (1845 - 1872), an indigenous rebel leader.
