= Riobamba Canton =

- Canton
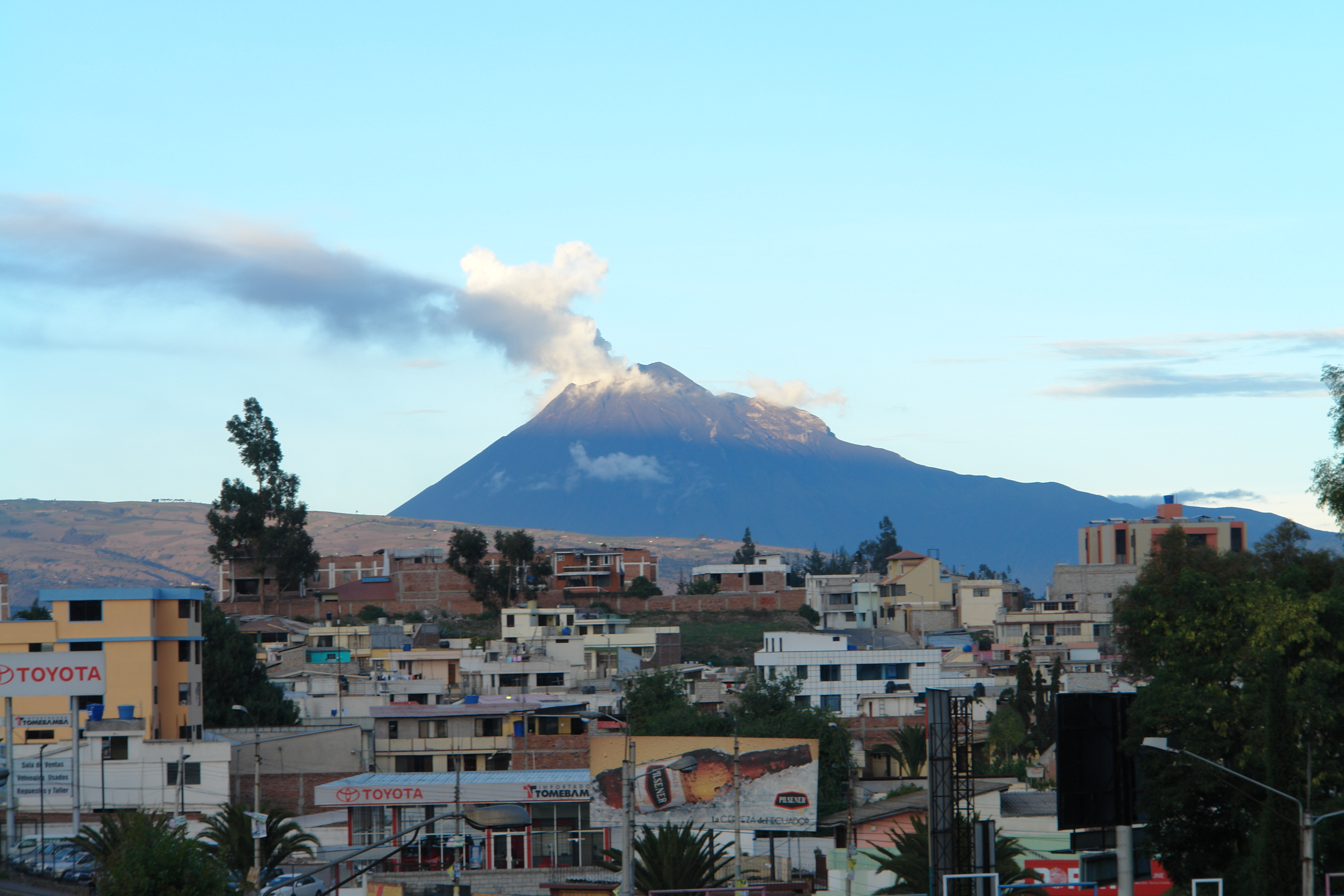
- Tungurahua volcano as seen from Riobamba

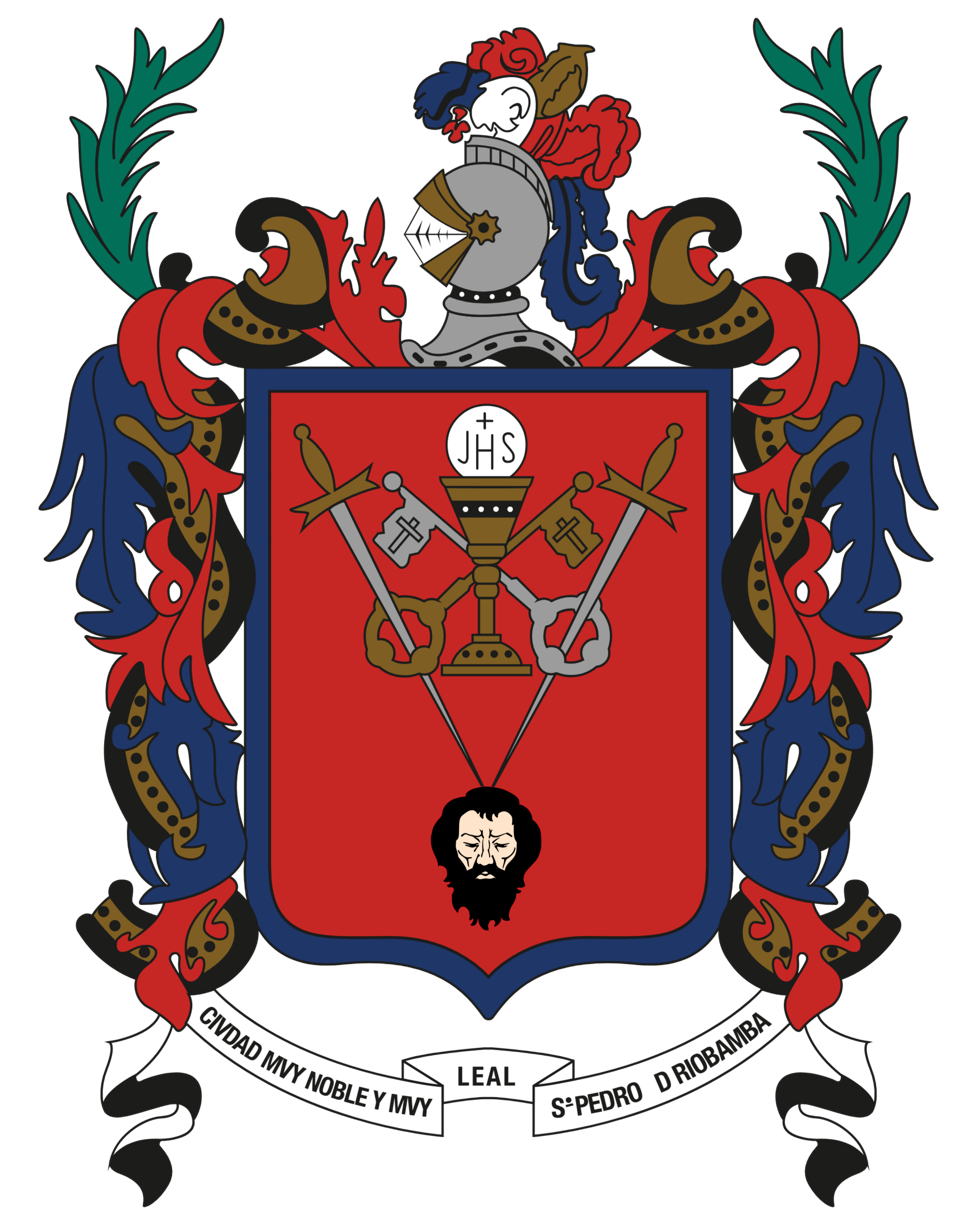
- Flag Seal

- Riobamba Canton in Chimborazo Province

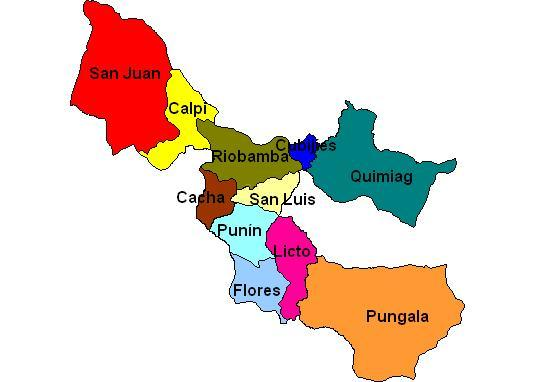
- Parishes of Riobamba Canton
- Coordinates: 1°40′27.65″S 78°38′53.86″W
- Country: Ecuador
- Province: Chimborazo Province
- Capital: Riobamba

Area
  - Total: 997.9 km^{2} (385.3 sq mi)

Population (2022 census)
  - Total: 260,882
  - Density: 261.4/km^{2} (677.1/sq mi)
- Time zone: UTC-5 (ECT)

Riobamba Canton is one of ten cantons of the Chimborazo Province in Ecuador. Its population at the 2010 census was 225,741. Its capital is the town of Riobamba.

== Subdivision ==
The canton is divided into 16 parishes, five urban parishes, Lizarzaburu, Maldonado, Velasco, Veloz and Yaruquíes, and eleven rural parishes: Cacha, Calpi, Cubijíes, Flores, Licán, Licto, Pungalá, Punín, Químiag, San Juan and San Luís.

Parish	Inhabitants (2010)
Total	225,741
Riobamba (urban)	156,723
Rural area	69,018
Cacha	3,160
Calpi Parish	6,469
Cubijíes Parish	2,514
Flores Parish	4,546
Licán Parish	7,963
Licto Parish	7,807
Pungalá Parish	5,954
Punín Parish	5,976
Químiag Parish	5,257
San Juan Parish	7,370
San Luís Parish	12,002
