= Riobamba =

- City
- San Pedro de Riobamba
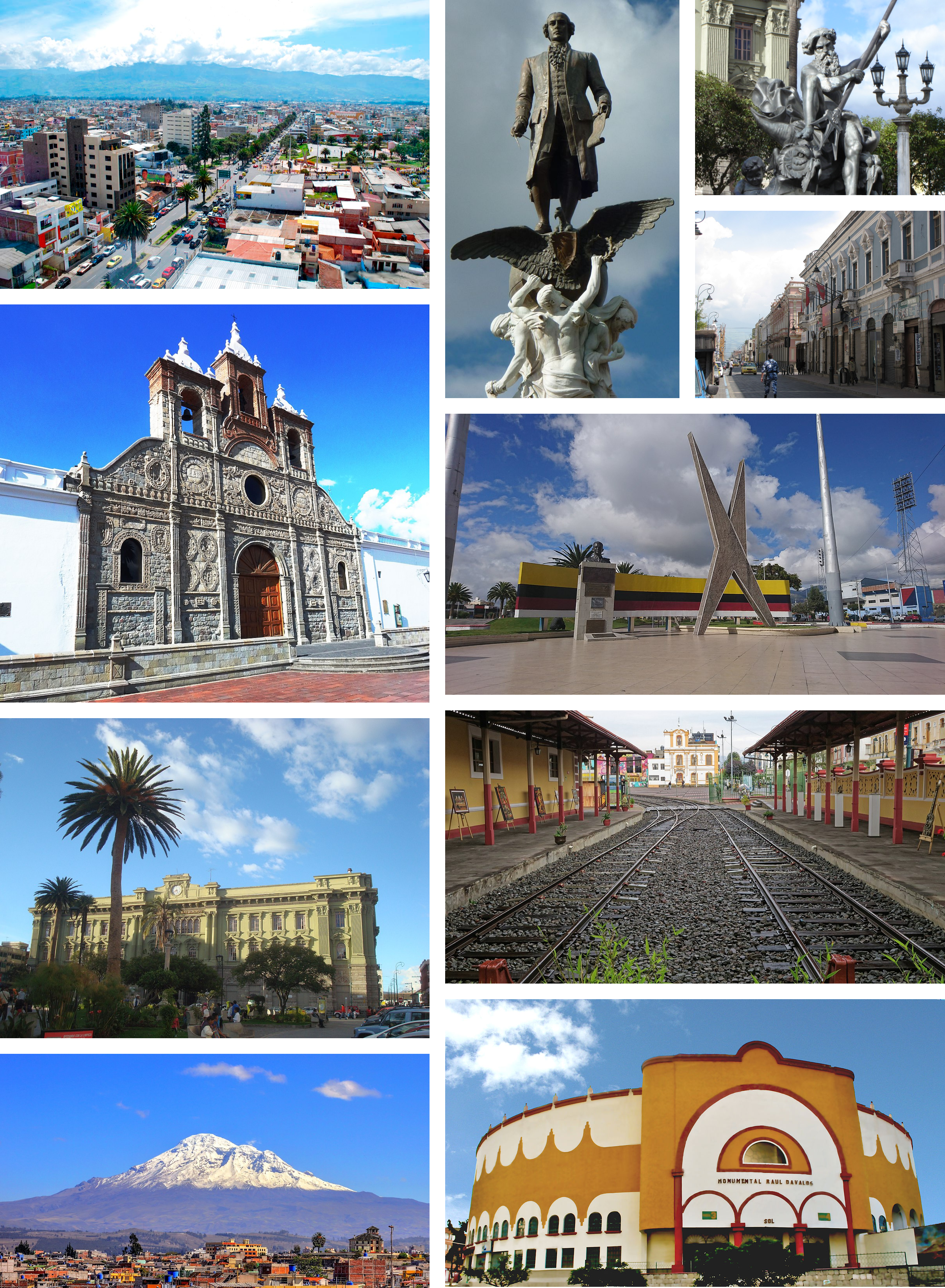
- From top, left to right: Panoramic view of the city, monument to Pedro Vicente Maldonado, sculpture of Neptune, Primera Constituyente Street, Catedral de San Pedro, monument to Edmundo Chiriboga, Maldonado High School, Riobamba railway station, Chimborazo volcano and Monumental Raúl Dávalos bullring.

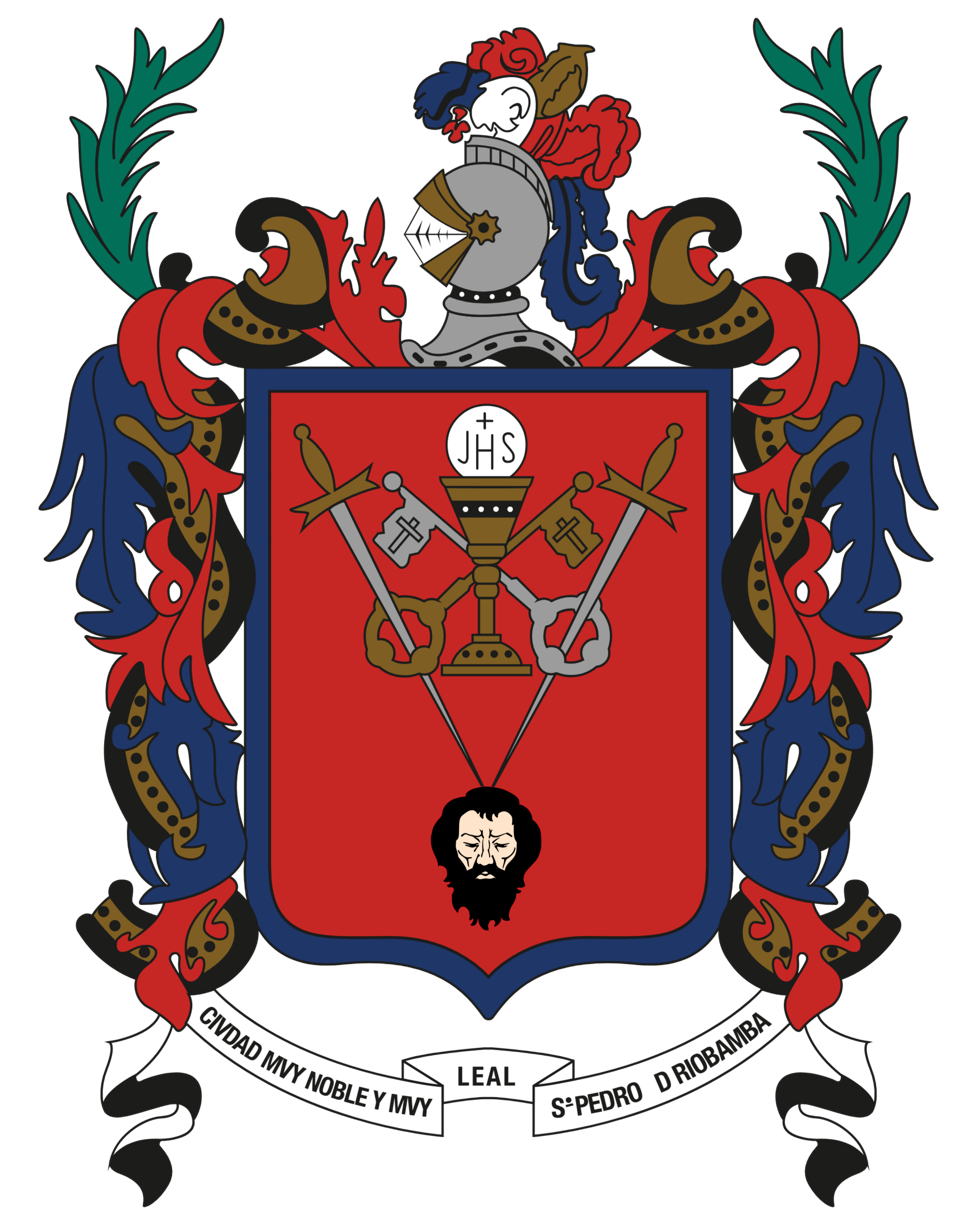
- Flag Coat of arms

- Location within Ecuador
- Coordinates: 01°40′23″S 78°38′54″W
- Country: Ecuador
- Province: Chimborazo
- Canton: Riobamba
- Founded: August 15, 1534
- Relocation: 1799
- Founder: Diego de Almagro
- Parishes: Urban Parishes: Lizarzaburu; Maldonado; Velasco; Veloz; Yaruquíes

Government
  - Mayor: John Vinueza

Area
  - City: 32.93 km^{2} (12.71 sq mi)
- Elevation: 2,754 m (9,035 ft)

Population (2022 census)
  - City: 177,213
  - Density: 5,382/km^{2} (13,940/sq mi)
- Time zone: UTC-5 (ECT)
- Website: www.gadmriobamba.gob.ec (in Spanish)

Riobamba (Spanish pronunciation: [rjoˈβamba], full name San Pedro de Riobamba; Quechua: Rispampa) is the capital of Chimborazo Province in central Ecuador, and is located in the Chambo River Valley of the Andes. It is located 200 km (120 mi) south of Ecuador's capital Quito and situated at an elevation of 2,754 m.

The city is an important regional transport center and a stop on the Pan-American Highway, which runs through Ecuador. Riobamba is one of the largest cities in the central portion of Ecuador's Sierra region.

== Name ==
Riobamba takes its name from a combination of rio, the Spanish word for "river", and rispampa, the Quechua word for "plain."

== History ==
The region surrounding Riobamba was inhabited by the Puruhá nation before the advance of the Inca Empire during the late 15th century. The Puruha fiercely resisted the Inca efforts to conquer the north of today's Ecuador. The Inca Huayna Capac had to make an alliance in order to pacify the tribes who sided with Condorazo, the general of the Puruha nation.

He allied with the Schyris confederation, also known as the Caran-Quitu people, believed to have developed the Kingdom of Quito in the northern Andes. The 18th-century Jesuit historian Juan de Velasco described this confederation as a group of tribes ruled by the Duchicela dynasty. Huayna Capac took the princess Paccha as his wife and gave special treatment and social status privileges to the higher castes of these new subjects. The son of this alliance was Atahualpa, who served as the last king of the Inca.

Following the Spanish invasion and conquest of the Inca and their allies, Riobamba was founded on 15 August 1534 in the San Miguel plains by Diego de Almagro. It is considered the first city to be established in what is modern-day Ecuador. In 1563, the city became part of the Spanish Empire's newly formed Royal Audience of Quito.

Although the city was completely destroyed by an earthquake in 1797, it was rebuilt a few years later 14 km (8.7 mi) from its original location. The second site was near a village named Cajabamba on the plains of San Antonio de Aguíscate. The city still retains much architecture from the Spanish colonial period. During the Ecuadorian War of Independence, Riobamba first declared independence on November 11, 1820, but was soon retaken by Crown forces. In 1822 the city became part of Gran Colombia, which gained independence from Spain that year. In 1830 the Republic of Ecuador established its own independence as a nation.

=== 20th century to present ===
The Monumental Raúl Dávalos, a 13,000-person capacity bullring, opened here in 1952. In 2011 the nation voted by referendum to prohibit matadors killing the bulls in such corridas, a policy also followed by Portugal. This has resulted in a dramatic decline in related tourism, with a substantial loss in revenues, especially in Quito.

On 20 November 2002, seven people were killed and hundreds wounded from a series of explosions at the munitions depot at the Galapagos Brigade arsenal in Riobamba. Such was the force of the explosion that many residents said they first thought there had been an earthquake or volcanic eruption. Windows were blown out more than 1.5 kilometres from the arsenal, and many of the injured suffered lacerations from flying shards of glass.

According to Colonel Arturo Cadena, a military spokesman in Quito, the initial explosion occurred during maintenance work inside the dump. In April 2003, the army published its final investigatory report of the explosion. It concluded that the Santa Barbara munitions factory was directly responsible for the explosion, which the army classified as an accident.

== Geography ==
Riobamba is located in the center of the country in the sierra region, in close proximity to the Chimborazo volcano. Like many cities in Ecuador, Riobamba has a near constant temperature year-round, with a wet and dry season. Its altitude (2754 m) and closeness to Chimborazo give the city a cool climate year-round, with temperatures averaging between 23 °C and 14 °C.

=== Climate ===
Climate data for Riobamba (Chimborazo Airport), elevation 2,796 m (9,173 ft), (2016–2025 normals)
Month	Jan	Feb	Mar	Apr	May	Jun	Jul	Aug	Sep	Oct	Nov	Dec	Year
Mean daily maximum °C (°F)	21.2 (70.2)	21.1 (70.0)	20.9 (69.6)	20.6 (69.1)	20.2 (68.4)	19.6 (67.3)	19.4 (66.9)	19.8 (67.6)	20.5 (68.9)	21.6 (70.9)	21.9 (71.4)	21.2 (70.2)	20.7 (69.2)
Daily mean °C (°F)	16.4 (61.5)	16.5 (61.7)	16.4 (61.5)	16.2 (61.2)	16.0 (60.8)	15.5 (59.9)	15.1 (59.2)	15.0 (59.0)	15.9 (60.6)	16.9 (62.4)	17.2 (63.0)	16.7 (62.1)	16.2 (61.1)
Mean daily minimum °C (°F)	11.6 (52.9)	11.9 (53.4)	11.9 (53.4)	11.9 (53.4)	11.9 (53.4)	11.4 (52.5)	10.7 (51.3)	10.3 (50.5)	11.2 (52.2)	12.2 (54.0)	12.4 (54.3)	12.1 (53.8)	11.6 (52.9)
Average precipitation mm (inches)	25 (1.0)	45 (1.8)	52 (2.0)	51 (2.0)	30 (1.2)	38 (1.5)	16 (0.6)	16 (0.6)	29 (1.1)	48 (1.9)	46 (1.8)	28 (1.1)	424 (16.6)
Average relative humidity (%)	76.5	78.9	79.3	79.5	81.0	79.9	77.9	75.5	73.7	73.5	73.7	75.7	77.1
Source 1: IEM
Source 2: FAO (precipitation 1971–2000)

== Economy ==
The economy of the city is based on the agricultural production of the surrounding local populations. Riobamba is also an important trade center of cattle-ranching. The city has an open-air market where indigenous artisans display and sell their wares. They make products such as handwoven textiles, handicrafts, leather goods, beer, and dairy products.

== Education ==
Universities include Universidad Nacional de Chimborazo, Escuela Superior Politecnica de Chimborazo, Universidad Politécnica Salesiana, Universidad San Francisco de Quito, and Instituto Tecnologico superior Isabel de Godin.

== Cityscape ==
Riobamba is a mid-level city in Ecuador, and the tenth largest in terms of population. It is the urban center of the Riobamba canton. Its historic center that has a number of well-preserved churches.

=== Festivals ===
The main celebration in Riobamba is Fiesta del Niño Rey de Reyes, which starts in December and ends on January 6, Epiphany. Another celebration is Riobamba's Independence Day on 21 April.

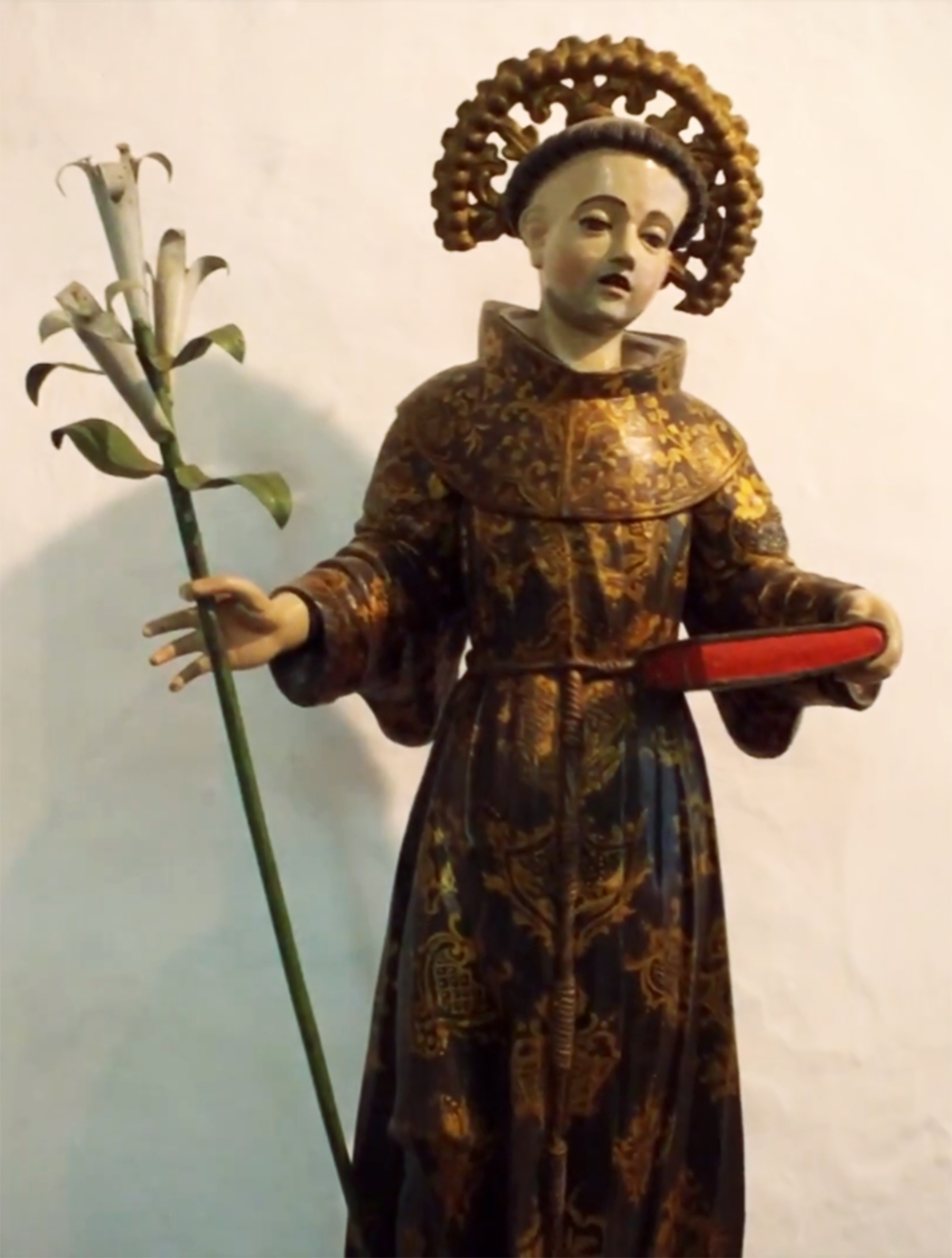
Sculpture (wood) of Saint Anthony of Padua (17th century), Museum of the Concepción.

=== Museums ===
- Arte Religioso de la Concepción

This museum has a gem-encrusted gold monstrance. The art included in this religious collection is from the 18th century.

- Museum Córdoba Román

The Cordoba Roman family established a private collection consisting of ancient art, archaeological pieces, documents, and other possessions. They donated it to Riobamba municipality as the basis of a city museum.

- Armas

It exhibits a wide selection of arms and uniforms. It also has religious materials from various epochs of Ecuador's history. It is located on Ave. Héroes de Tapi.

- Casa de Bolívar
- Antropológico del Banco Central
- Museum y Centro Cultural Riobamba del Banco Central
- Museum "Paquita Jaramillo"
- Museum "Cultural Fernando Daquilema"
- Museum Didáctico de Ciencias Naturales, at Pedro Vicente Maldonado high school

=== Sports ===
Riobamba is the home city of one top-level football club, Centro Deportivo Olmedo.

Cockfights are usually seen during Riobamba's festivities and on weekends at the Gallera San Francisco.

Riobamba is the trekking and mountain climbing capital of Ecuador. It is the base city for climbs of Carihuairazo, Chimborazo, Sangay, El Altar, and the Lost Pyramid of Puñay. Mountain biking is another common sport.

=== Sightseeing ===
A scenic train ride (Nariz Del Diablo) leaves Riobamba three times a week, passing the Devil's Nose and Alausí round trip, with zig-zags. Before 2009 passengers were permitted to sit on the roof, but this practice has been prohibited for safety reasons.

== Notable people ==
- Pedro Vicente Maldonado (1704–1748) – scientist, astronomer, mathematician, topographer, geographer
- Magdalena Dávalos y Maldonado (1725–1806) – scholar and literary figure, painter, musician
- Juan de Velasco (1727–1792) – Jesuit priest, historian, professor, poet, writer
- Luz Elisa Borja Martínez (1903–1927) – poet, pianist, painter, and sculptor
- Luis A Costales (1926–2006) – poet, philosopher, speaker, historian, and politician
- María Murgueytio (1927–2016) – first woman in Ecuador to hold a mayoral office
- Pacifico Chiriboga (1810–1886) – early Ecuadorean politician
- Bolívar Echeverría (1941–2010) – philosopher, economist, cultural critic
- Euler Granda (1935–2018) – poet, writer, psychiatrist
- Oswaldo Moncayo (1923–1984) – painter
- Oswaldo Muñoz Mariño (1923–2016) – architect, painter

== Gallery ==
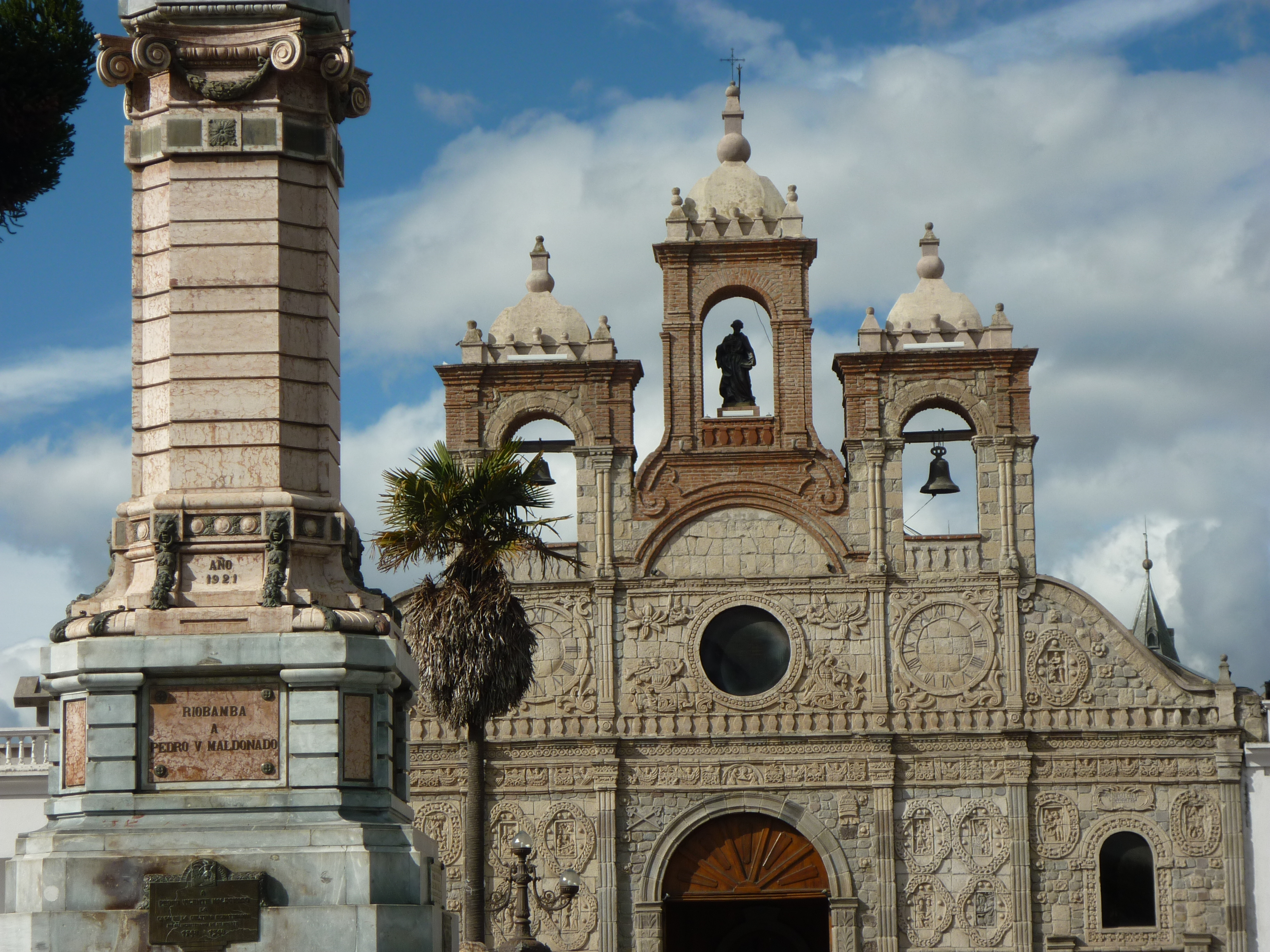
Cathedral

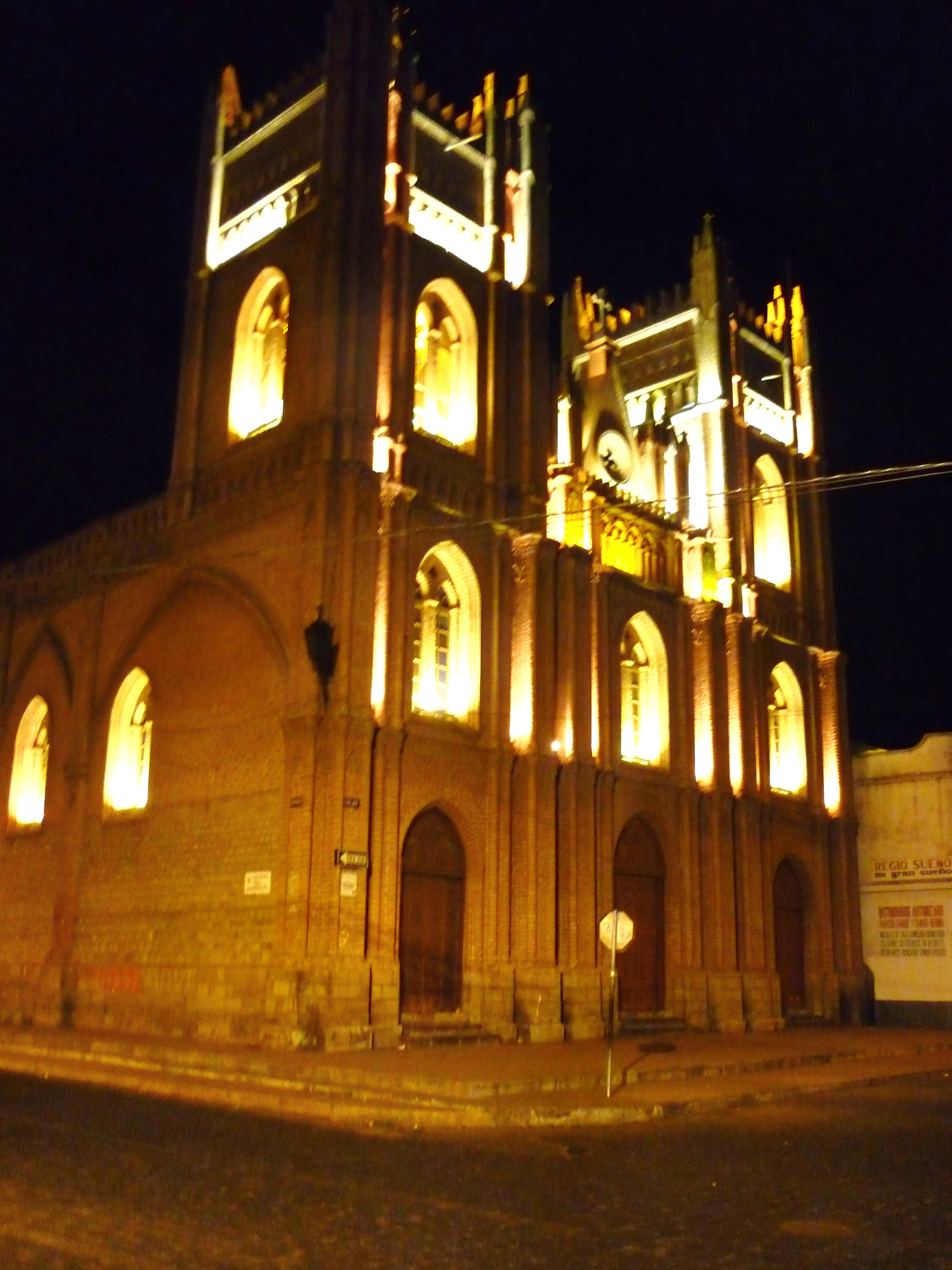
Iglesia de la Concepción

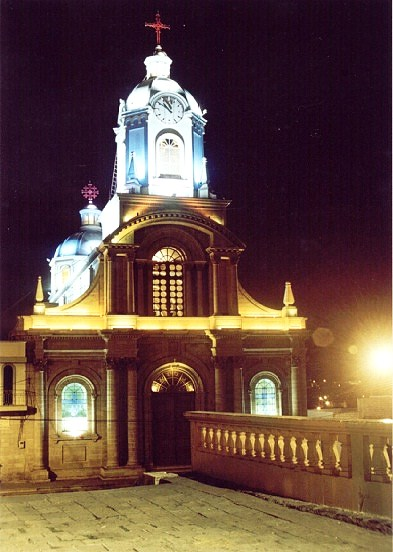
Loma de Quito's Church

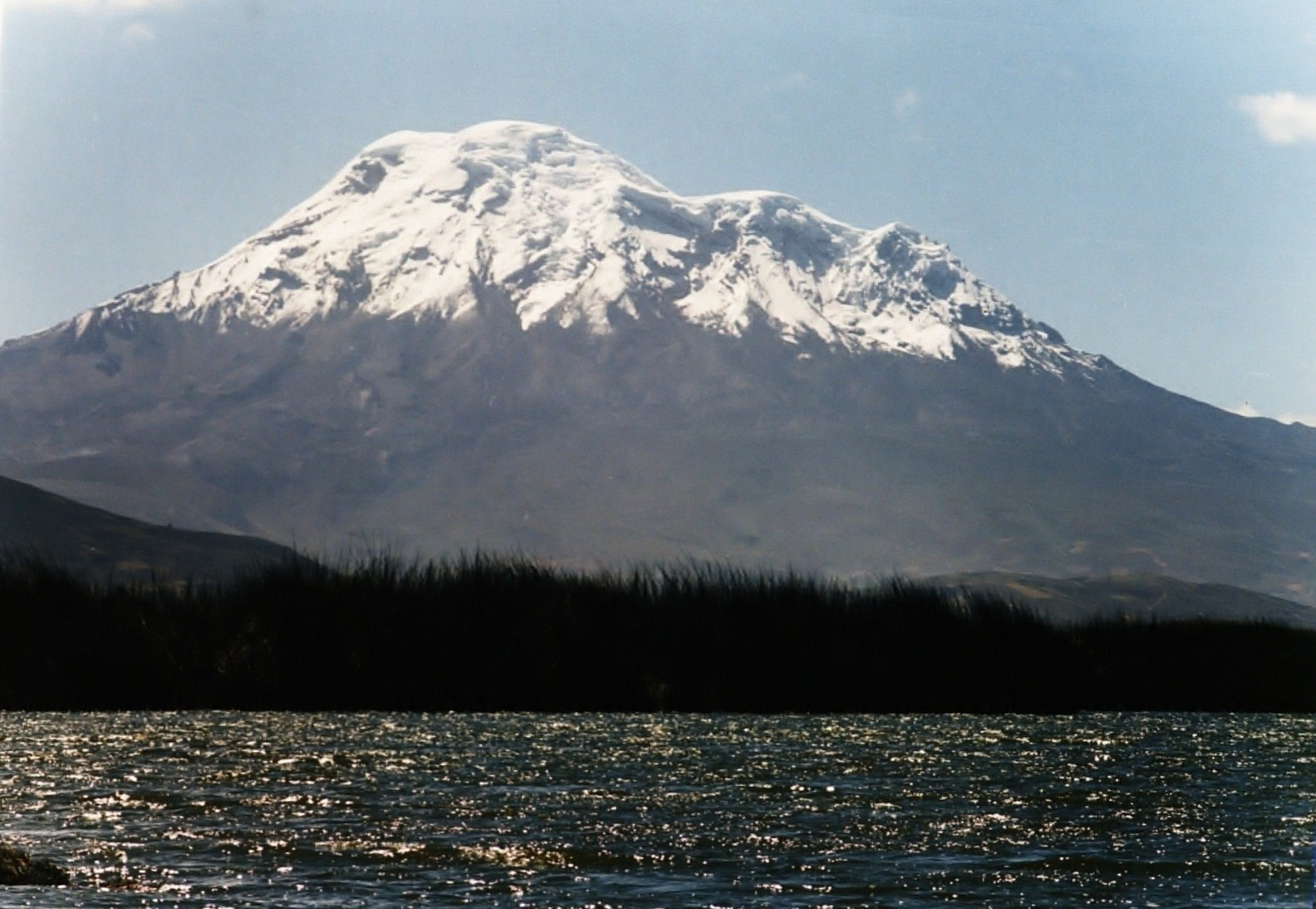
The Chimborazo volcano

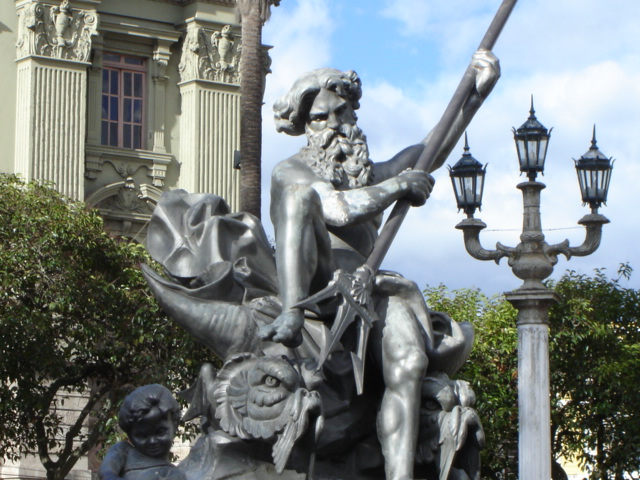
Neptuno

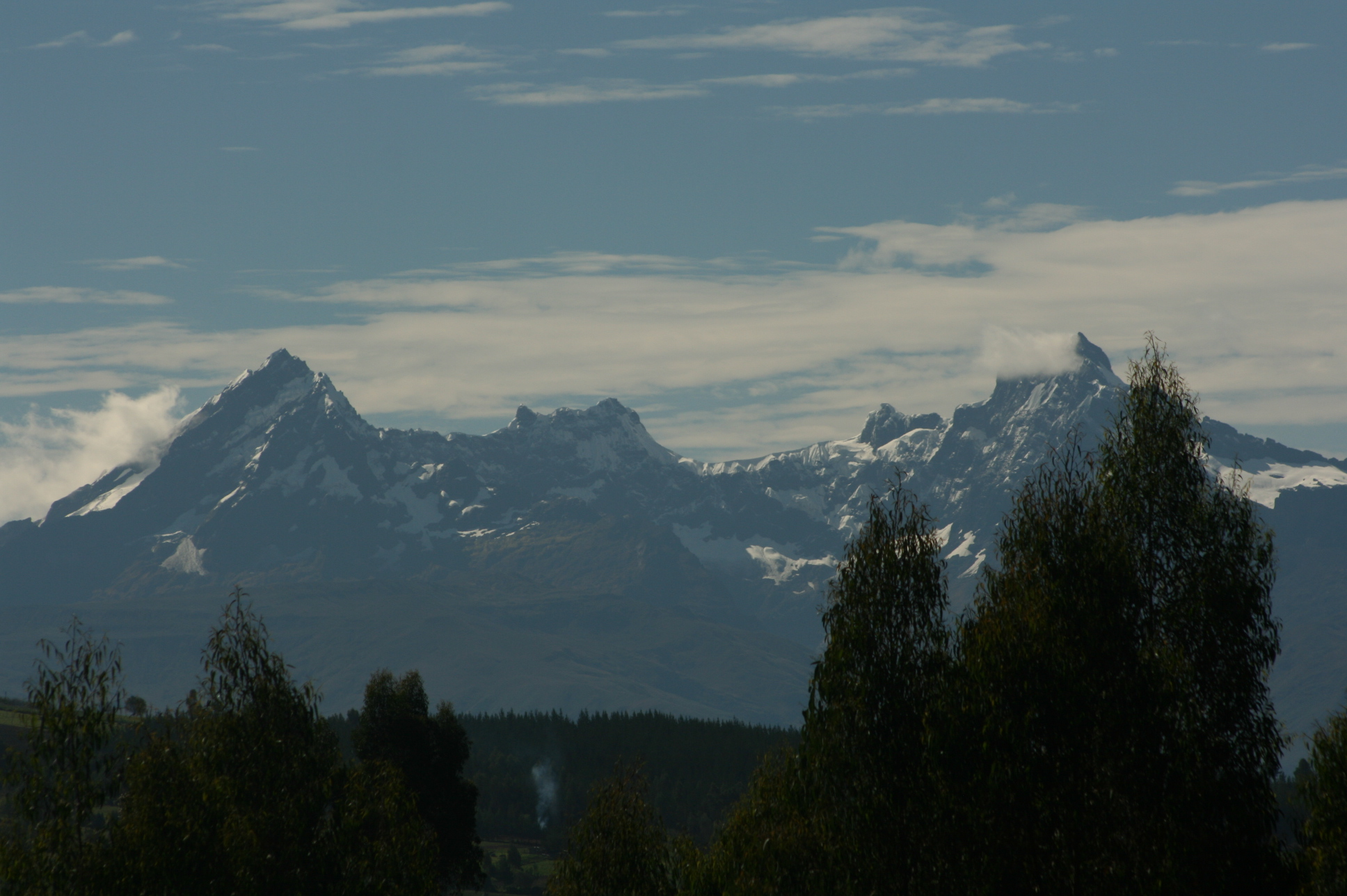
Los Altares

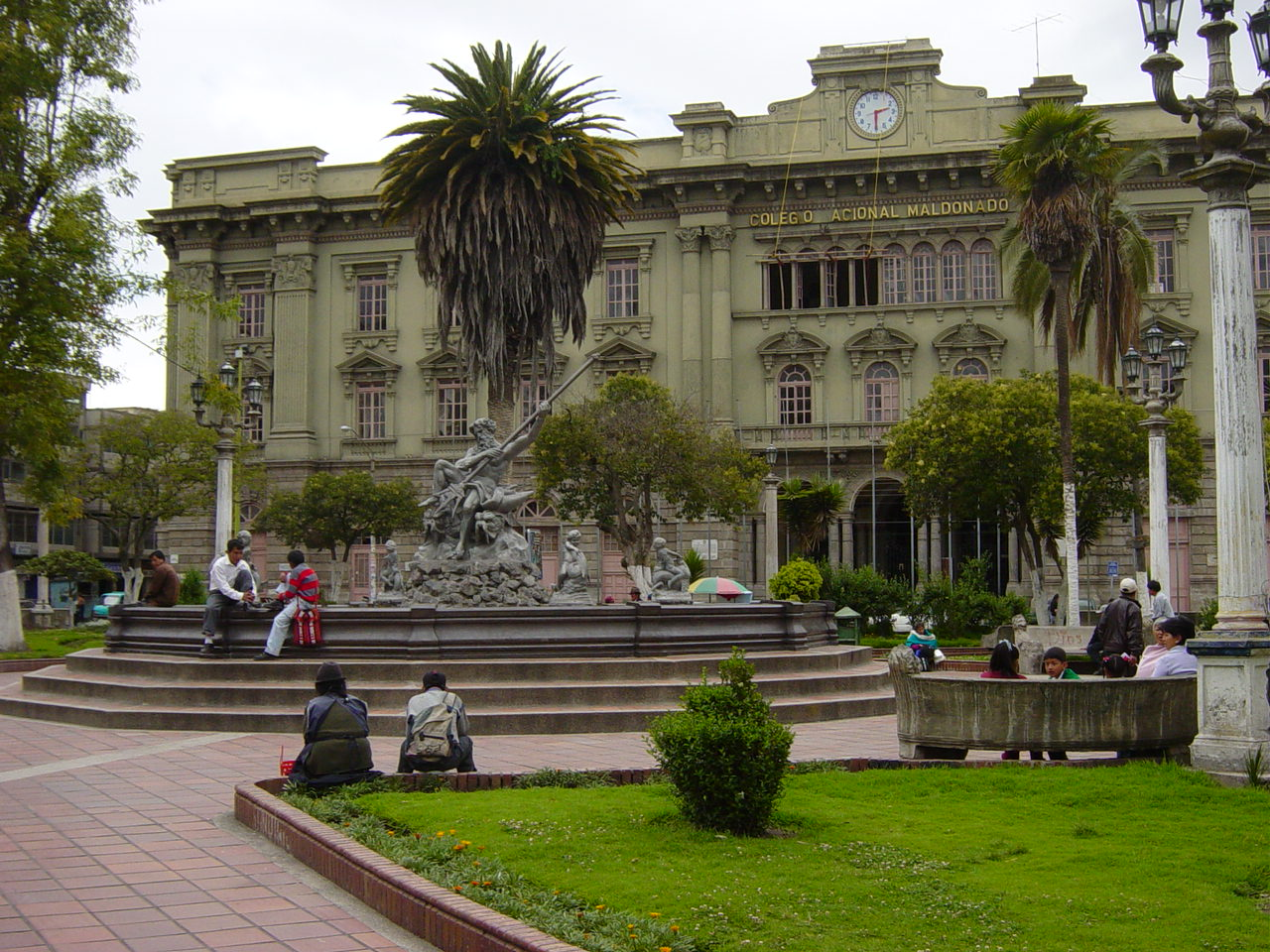
Maldonado's Park

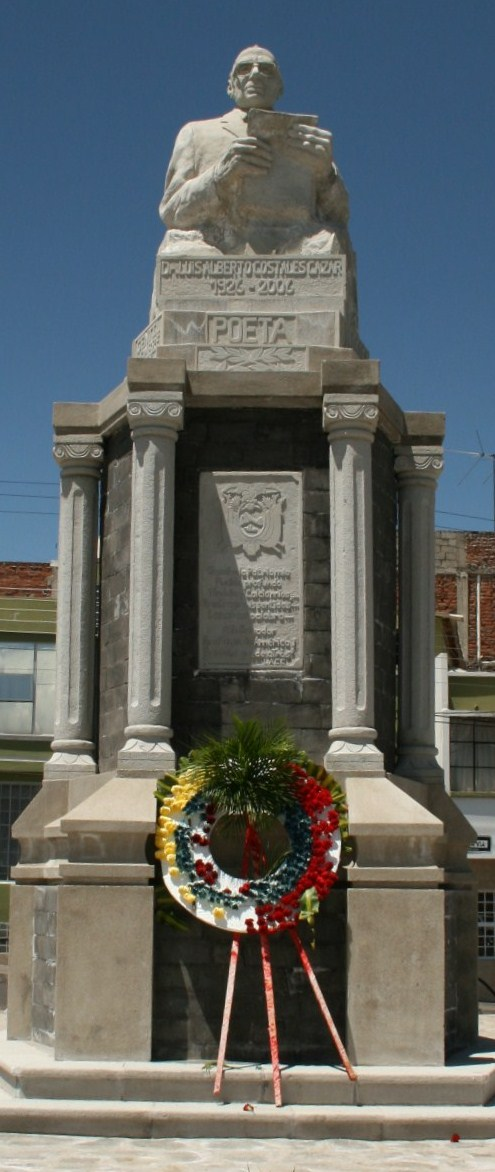
Luis Costales monument

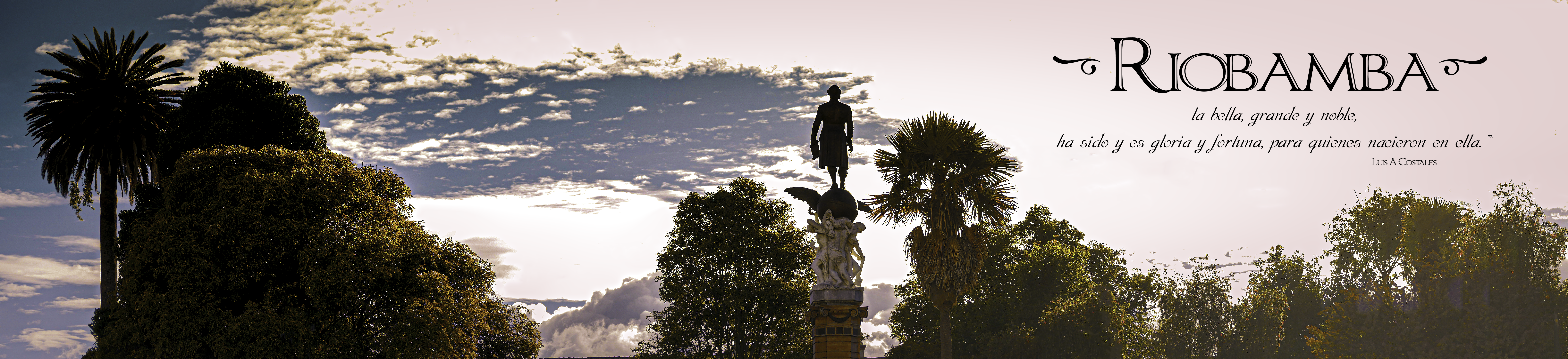
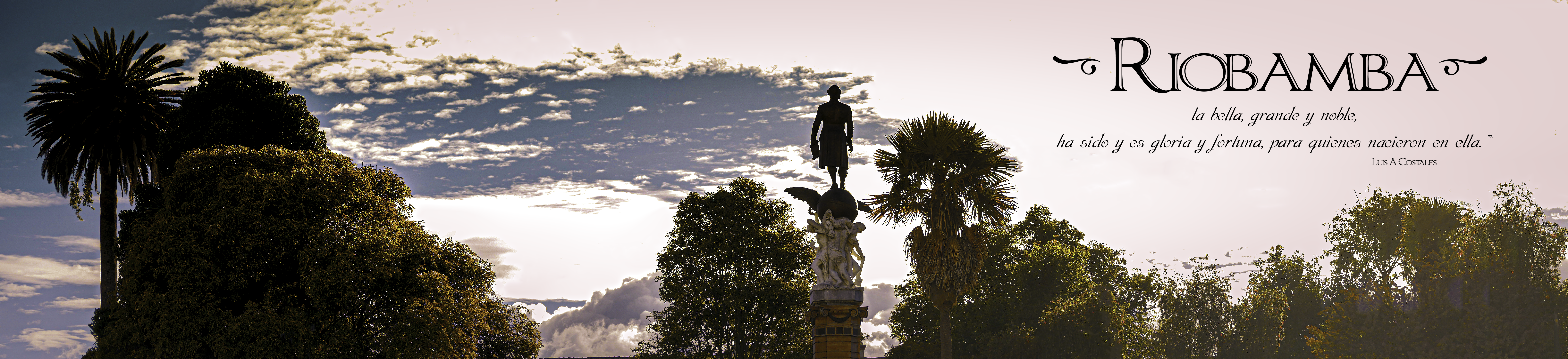
“ Riobamba, la bella, grande y noble, ha sido y es gloria y fortuna, para quienes nacieron en ella. “ - Luis A Costales
