= Puruhá =

Ecuadorian indigenous people

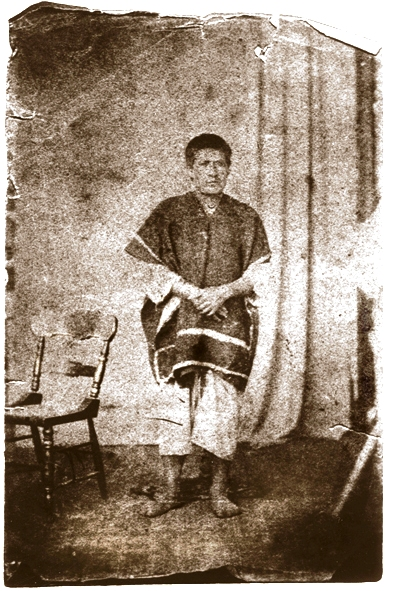
Picture of Fernando Daquilema (Puruhá), a rebel in the 1871 uprising

The Puruhá are an indigenous people of Ecuador. Their traditional area in the highlands of the Andes Mountains includes much of Chimborazo Province and parts of Bolívar Province.

== History ==
In the early period they grew subsistence crops, raised guinea pigs, and were part of trade with the Inca before the latter took over the Andean region in the 15th century. In the sixteenth century, at the time of the Spanish invasion and conquest, the population may have been as high as 155,000. The numbers of Puruha and Quechua peoples declined dramatically after that because of high mortality from new infectious diseases carried by Spanish colonists. This led to widespread social disruption and more deaths. By the eighteenth century, few speakers of the Puruhá language remained. The indigenous peoples had largely shifted to speaking Quechua languages, introduced by the Inca with their takeover in the 15th century.

Leaders of the local Catholic Church had preferred that the indigenous people speak Quechua, as high-ranking Spaniards had intermarried with the Inca peoples. The change in language adversely affected the ability of the Puruhá to maintain the distinctiveness of their culture from Quechua peoples.

After the eighteenth century, the Puruhá arose in unrest against rulers from time to time. In 1871 there was a rebellion of indigenous people against the ruling class of Chimborazo Province over issues of taxation and labor drafts. It included many Puruhá and was led by Fernando Daquilema. The Riobamba Canton was the main area of fighting in the region.

During the rebellion, whites and mestizos were expelled from Punín. Despite some initial successes, the movement ultimately failed. Many of the Puruhá received amnesty from the Gabriel García Moreno government. A few leaders, including Daquilema, were executed. The rebellion has had legendary status in the province's history among the indigenous peoples.

== Religion ==
The traditional religion was led by jambiri (medicine people or shamans). The people believed that the gods were linked to the mountains, which were sacred and dominated the skyline of the region. The people offered the gods tobacco and rum, as were typical offerings also in other Andean traditional religions.

Catholic Christianity is a syncretic faith, and many of the Puruhá gradually combined their traditional ideas with their understanding and practice of Catholicism. The economic and political power of the upper class, composed largely of European and mestizo Ecuadorians, has continued to be resented by many indigenous peasants, who feel unfairly discriminated against, especially economically.

In the 1960s, Protestant Evangelicalism became increasingly popular as an alternative to Catholicism, considered to support the upper over the lower classes. In addition, many Puruhá were attracted to the teetotalism of the missionaries. Commercial alcohol liquor was increasingly expensive, and the Puruha also recognized the damage done to their people by alcohol abuse. By absolutely rejecting alcohol, the Puruhá believed they were improving their condition as a people. Evangelical missionaries were considered to have a general emphasis on healthy living.
