= San Francisco de Asís District =

Coordinates: 9°58′24″S 76°40′28″W

San Francisco de Asís Warin
- District
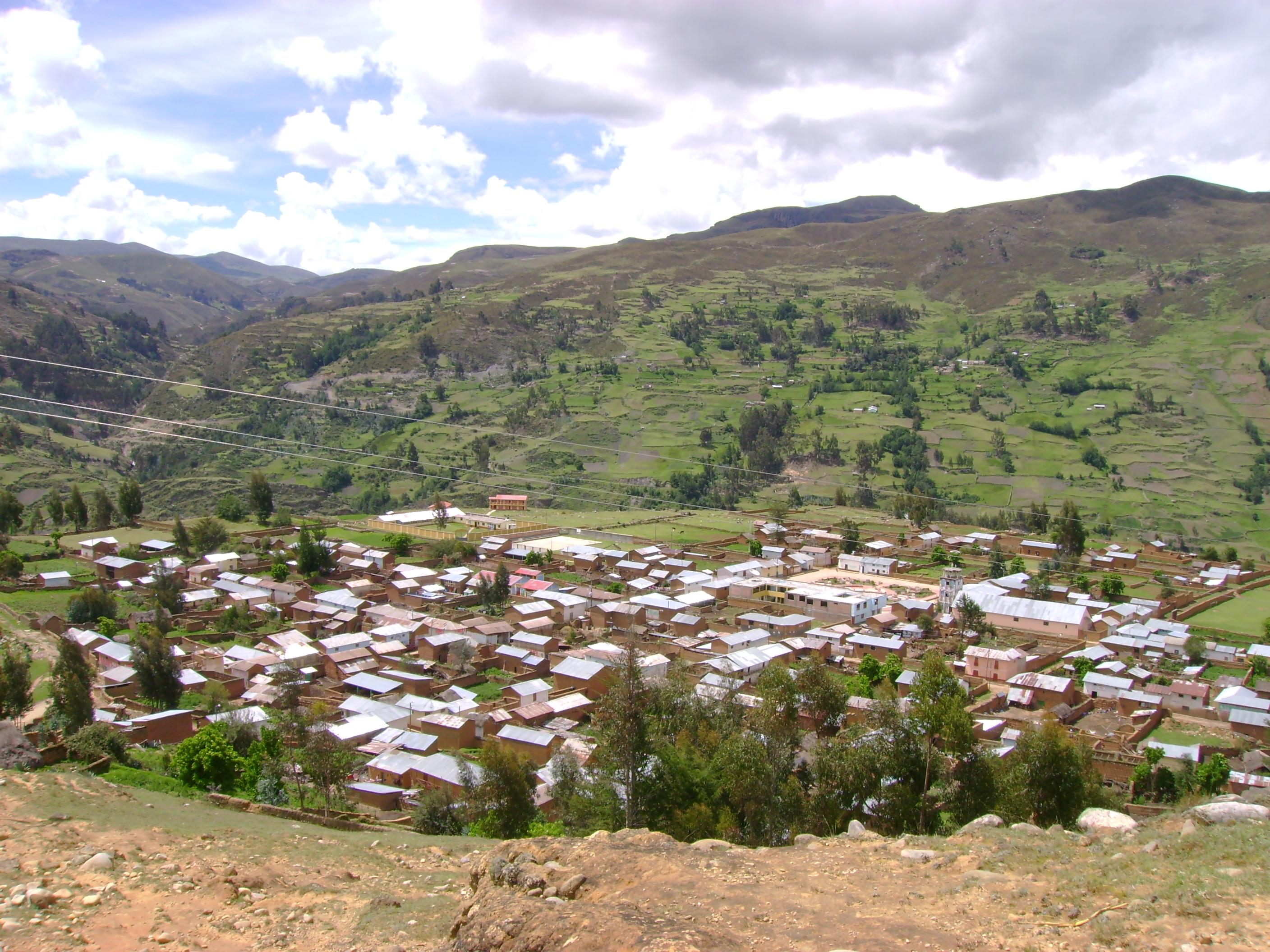
- Warin
- Interactive map of San Francisco de Asís
- Country: Peru
- Region: Huánuco
- Province: Lauricocha
- Founded: April 20, 1960
- Capital: Huarin

Government
  - Mayor: Aranibar Serafico Valdivia

Area
  - Total: 84.3 km^{2} (32.5 sq mi)
- Elevation: 3,437 m (11,276 ft)

Population (2005 census)
  - Total: 2,281
  - Density: 27.1/km^{2} (70.1/sq mi)
- Time zone: UTC-5 (PET)
- UBIGEO: 101006

San Francisco de Asís is one of seven districts of the province Lauricocha in Peru.
