= Geography of Ecuador =

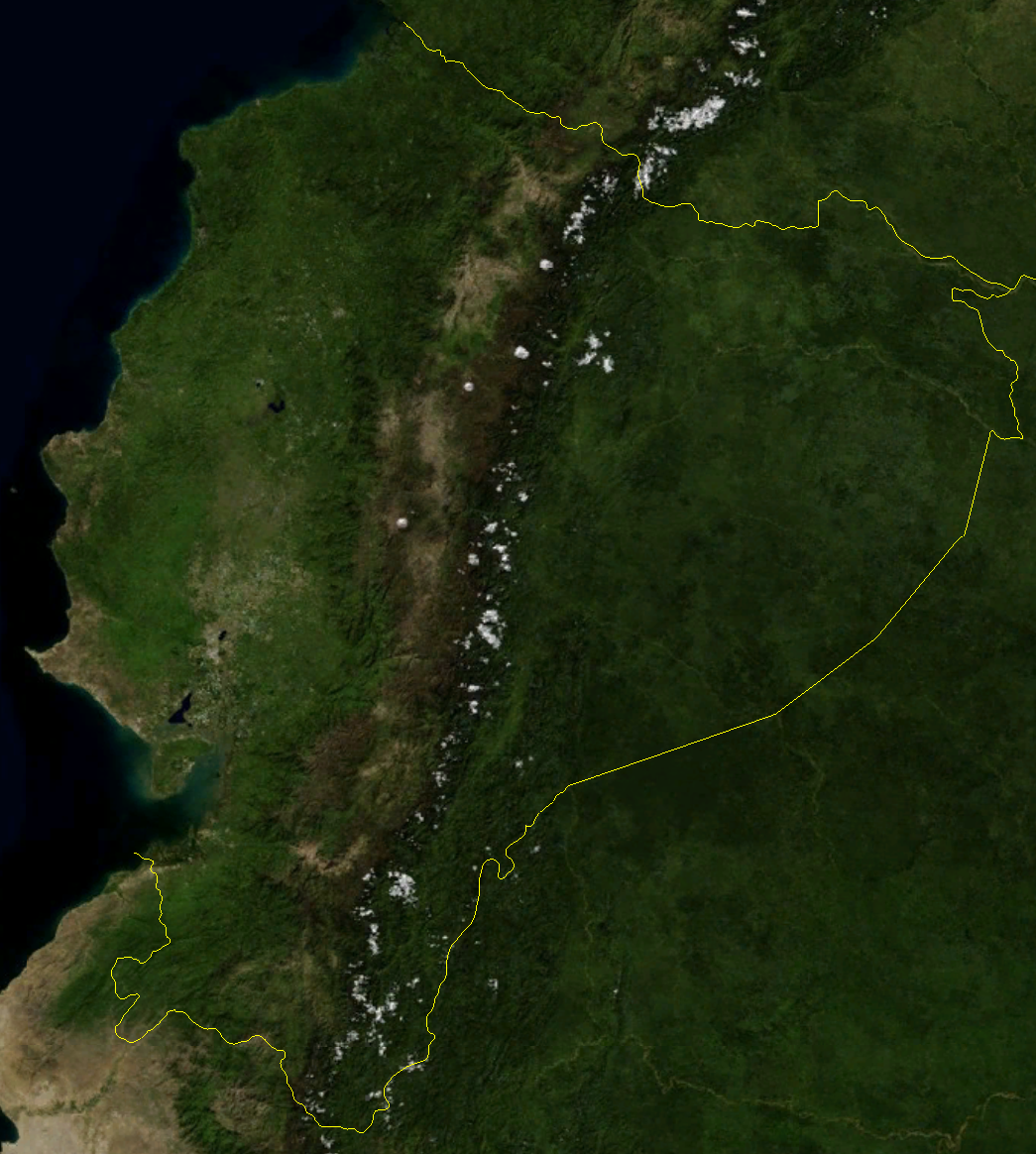
- Continent: South America
- Region: Americas
- Coordinates: 2°00′S 77°30′W
- Area: Ranked 73rd
  - Total: 283,561 km^{2} (109,484 sq mi)
  - Land: 97.63%
  - Water: 2.37%
- Coastline: 2,237 km (1,390 mi)
- Borders: Total land borders: 2,237 km (1,390 mi); Colombia: 708 km (440 mi); Peru: 1,529 km (950 mi)
- Highest point: Chimborazo 6,267 m (20,561 ft)
- Lowest point: Pacific Ocean (0 m)
- Longest river: Río Napo 855 km (531 mi)
- Largest lake: Cuicocha 3 km^{2} (1.2 mi^{2})
- Exclusive economic zone: 1,077,231 km^{2} (415,921 mi^{2})

Ecuador is a country in western South America, bordering the Pacific Ocean at the Equator, for which the country is named. Ecuador encompasses a wide range of natural formations and climates, from the desert-like southern coast to the snowcapped peaks of the Andes mountain range to the plains of the Amazon Basin. Cotopaxi in Ecuador is one of the world's highest active volcanos. It also has a large series of rivers that follow the southern border and spill into the northwest area of Peru.

== Area and borders ==
Ecuador is located on the west by the Pacific Ocean, and has 2,237 km of coastline. It has 2237 km of land boundaries, with Colombia in the north (708 km border) and Peru in the east and south (1,529 km border). 283,561 km^{2} (109,484 sq mi) is land and 6,720 km^{2} (2,595 sq mi) water. Ecuador is one of the smallest countries in South America, but bigger than Uruguay, Guyana, Suriname and French Guiana. It has the 29th largest exclusive economic zone of 1,077,231 km^{2} (415,921 mi^{2}) which includes the Galápagos Islands.

== Cities ==
The five largest cities in the country are Quito (2.78 million inhabitants), Guayaquil (2.72 million inhabitants), Cuenca (636,996 inhabitants), Santo Domingo (458,580 inhabitants), and Ambato (387,309 inhabitants). The most populated metropolitan areas of the country are those of Guayaquil, Quito, Cuenca, Manabí Centro (Portoviejo-Manta) and Ambato.

Largest cities or towns in Ecuador According to the 2020 population projections
Rank	Name	Province	Pop.	Rank	Name	Province	Pop.
1	Quito	Pichincha	2,781,641	11	Riobamba	Chimborazo	264,048
2	Guayaquil	Guayas	2,723,665	12	Ibarra	Imbabura	221,149
3	Cuenca	Azuay	636,996	13	Esmeraldas	Esmeraldas	218,727
4	Santo Domingo	Santo Domingo	458,580	14	Quevedo	Los Ríos	213,842
5	Ambato	Tungurahua	387,309	15	Latacunga	Cotopaxi	205,624
6	Portoviejo	Manabí	321,800	16	Milagro	Guayas	199,835
7	Durán	Guayas	315,724	17	Santa Elena	Santa Elena	188,821
8	Machala	El Oro	289,141	18	Babahoyo	Los Ríos	175,281
9	Loja	Loja	274,112	19	Daule	Guayas	173,684
10	Manta	Manabí	264,281	20	Quinindé	Esmeraldas	145,879

== Geographical regions ==
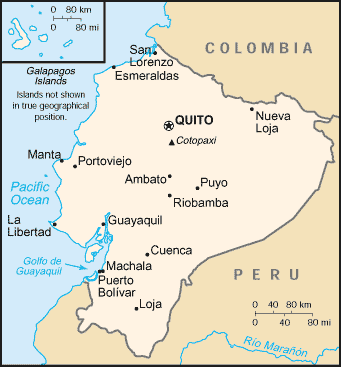
Map of Ecuador

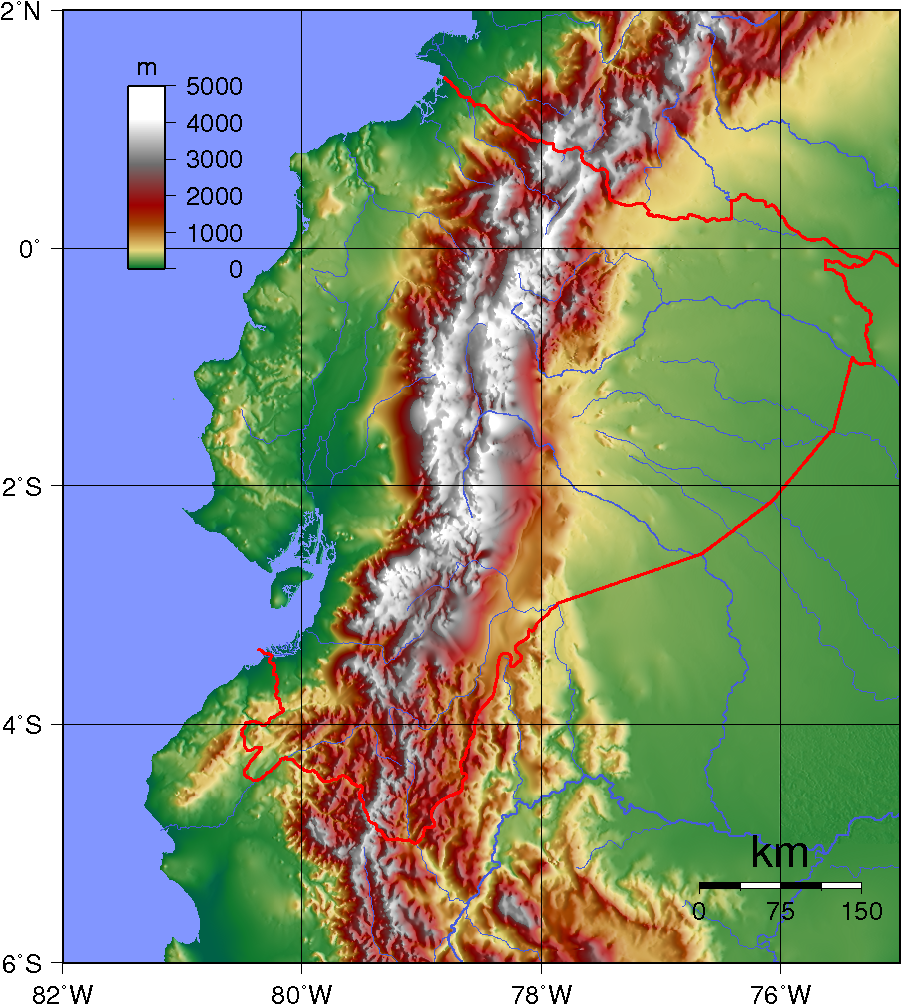
Topographic map of Ecuador

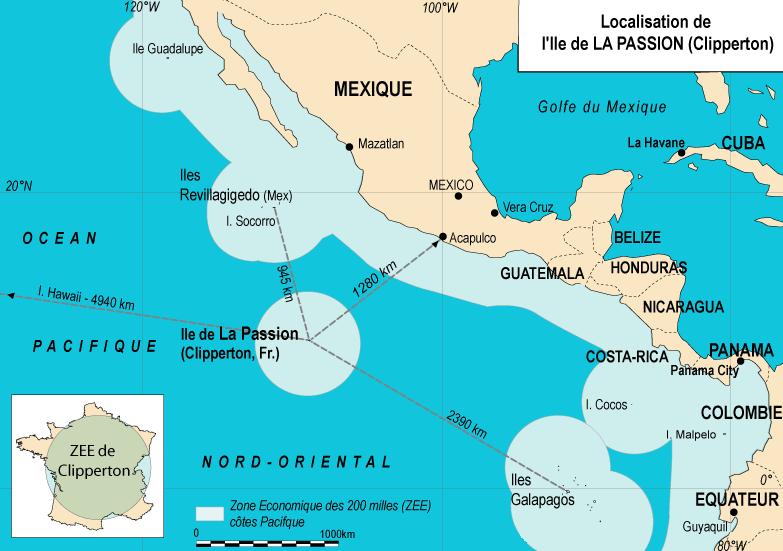
Extent of Ecuador's western EEZ in the Pacific

Ecuador is divided into three continental regions—the Costa (coast), Sierra (mountains), and Oriente (east)—and one insular region, the Galápagos Islands (officially Archipiélago de Colón). The continental regions extend the length of the country from north to south and are separated by the Andes Mountains.

=== Galápagos Islands ===
The Galápagos are located 1,000 kilometres (621 mi) west of the Ecuadorian coast. They are noted for their association with Charles Darwin, whose observation of animals here during the voyage of the Beagle led to his formation of the theory of natural selection as a means of evolution. The islands have witnessed a large number of tourists and travelers over recent years. Special species that could be found here include blue footed boobies, iguanas and many more. Internal flight services from Ecuador to Galápagos are also available for tourists making it more convenient for guests from outside.

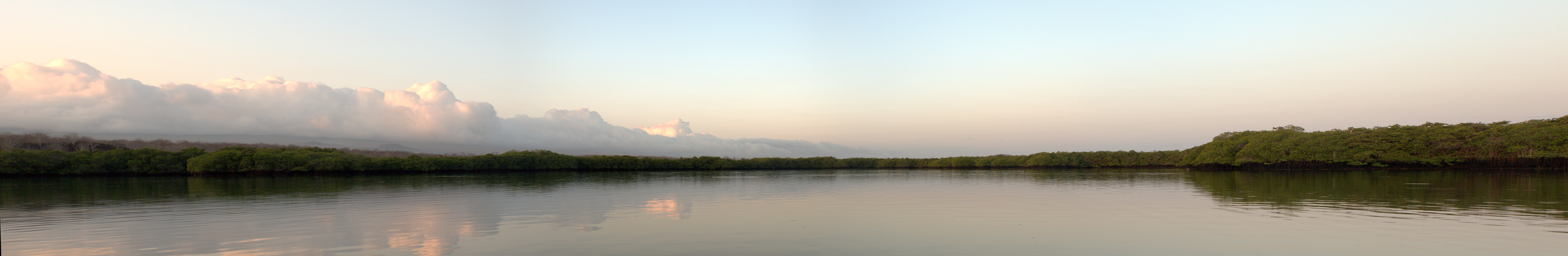
Panoramic of Black Turtle Cove, Island of Santa Cruz, Galapagos.

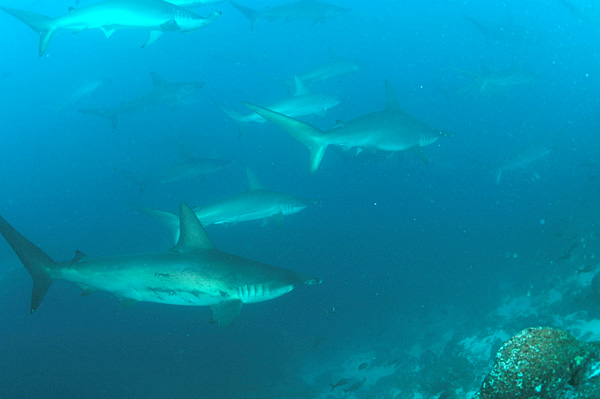
School of scalloped hammerheads, Wolf Island, Galápagos Islands

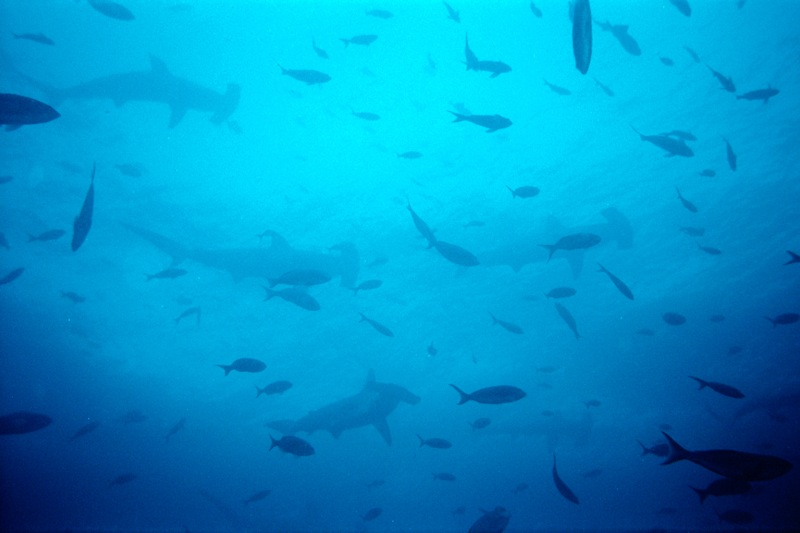
Another school of scalloped hammerheads at Wolf Island, Galapagos

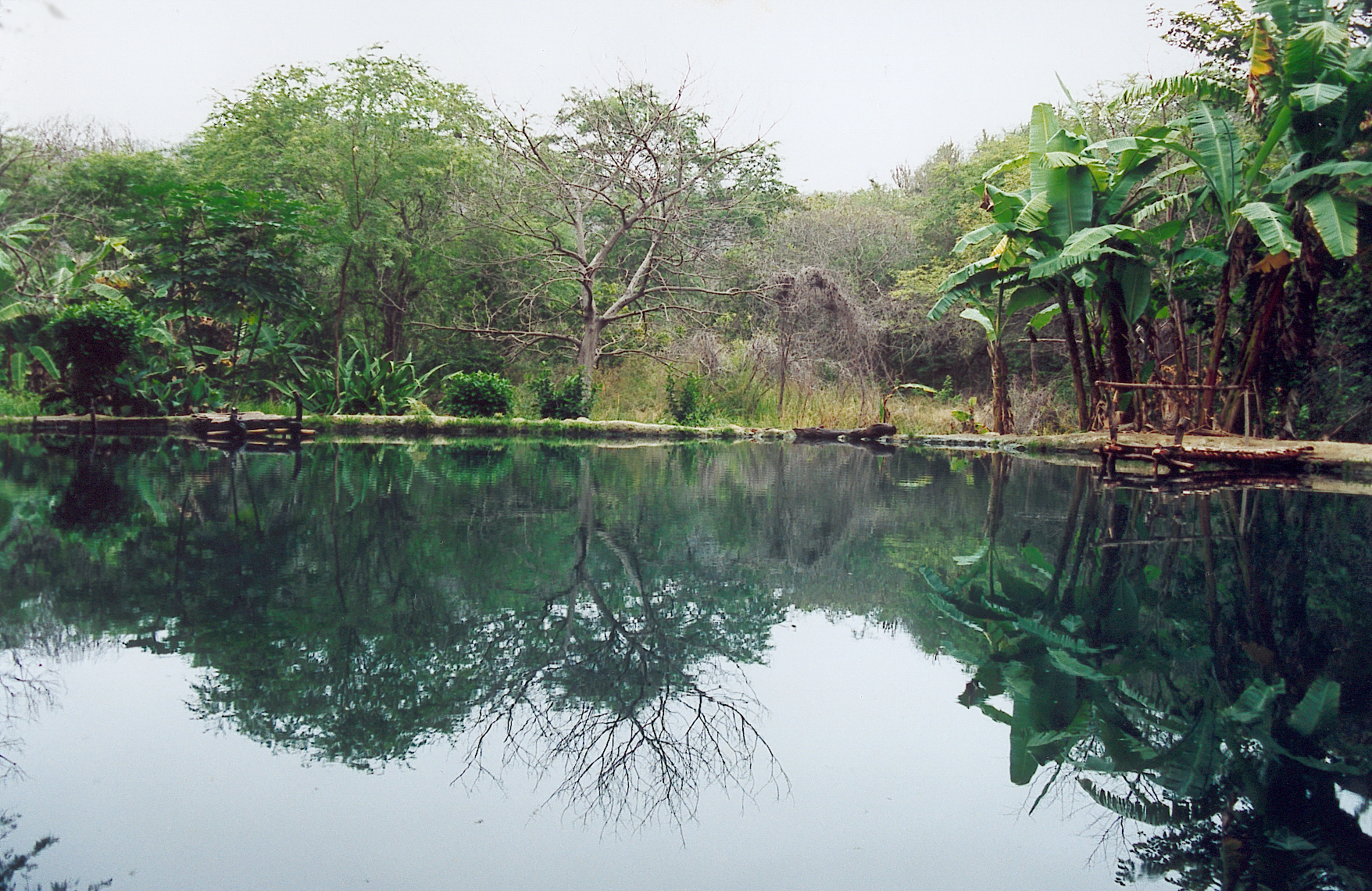
Sulfur laguna on the site of AguaBlanca, Machalilla National Park, Ecuador

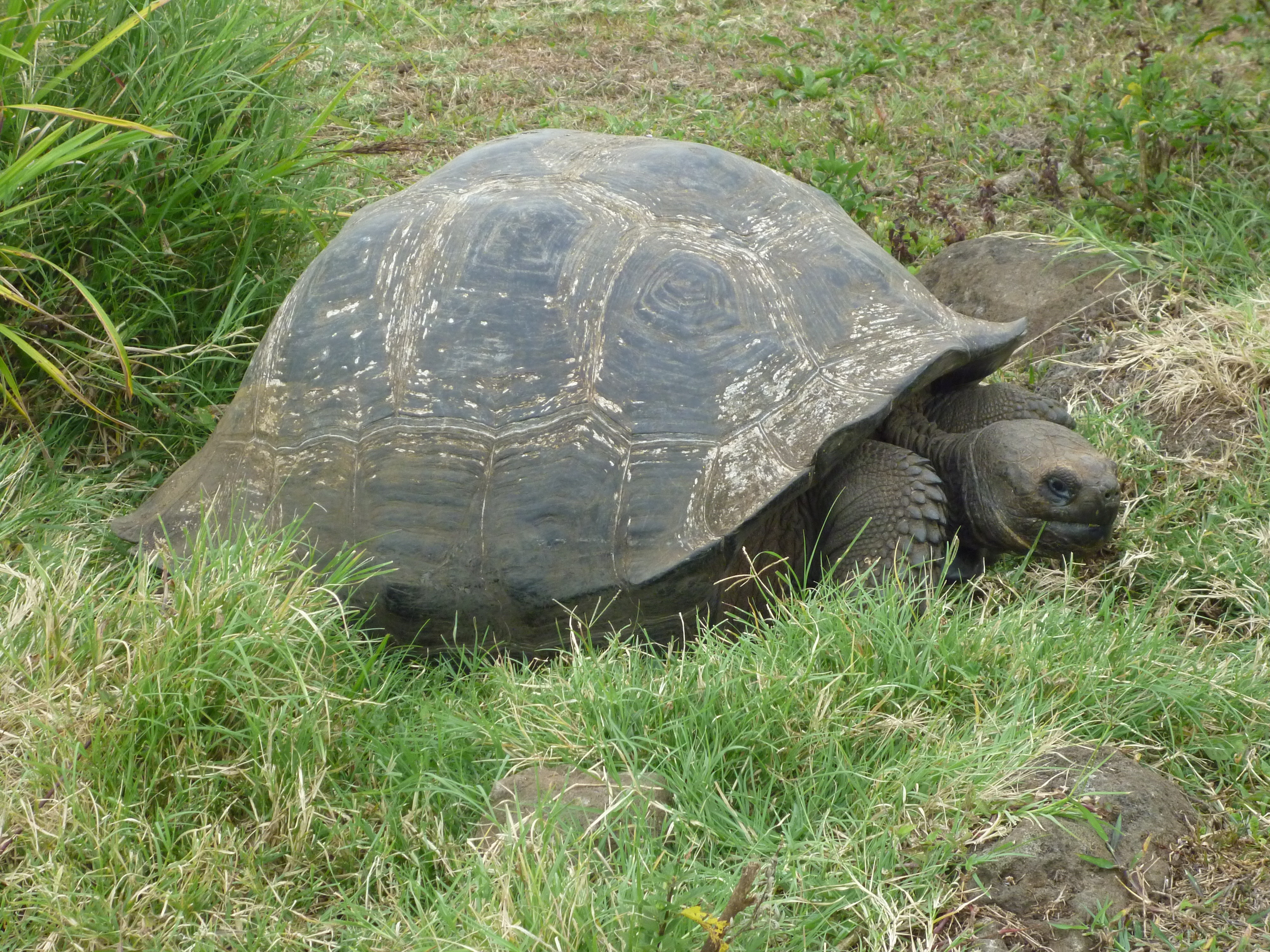
Galápagos tortoise on Santa Cruz Island (Galápagos)

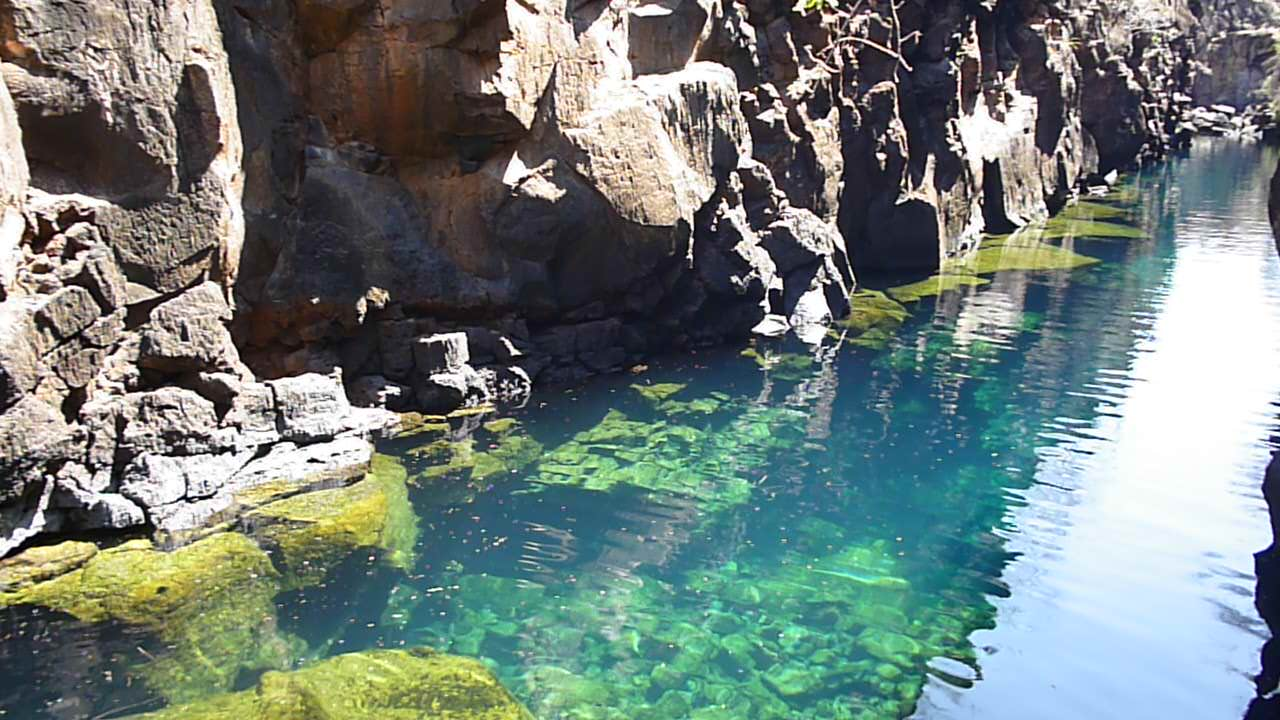
Fresh water swimming in Puerto Ayora, Galapagos on the Island of Santa Cruz.

=== La Costa ===
The western coastal area of Ecuador borders the Pacific Ocean to the west, encompasses a broad coastal plain, and then rises to the foothills of the Andes Mountains to the east. It is estimated that 98% of the native forest of coastal Ecuador has been eliminated in favor of cattle ranching and other agricultural production, including banana, cacao and coffee plantations. The forest fragments that still survive are primarily found along the coastal mountain ranges of Mache-Chindul, Jama-Coaque, and Chongon-Colonche, and include tropical dry forest, tropical wet forest, tropical moist evergreen forest, premontane cloud forest, and mangrove forest. Collectively known as the Pacific Equatorial Forest, these forest remnants are considered the most endangered tropical forest in the world, and are part of the Tumbes-Choco-Magdalena biodiversity hotspot. Guayaquil, located on the southern part of the coast is the biggest city in the country. On the north coast of Ecuador the port of Balao in Esmeraldas is used for oil export and the port of Manta was formerly used by the United States Air Force as a control point for narcotics traffic control until 2009.

A recent remote sensing analysis suggested that there were 635 km^{2} of tidal flats in Ecuador, making it the 41st ranked country in terms of tidal flat area.

=== La Sierra ===
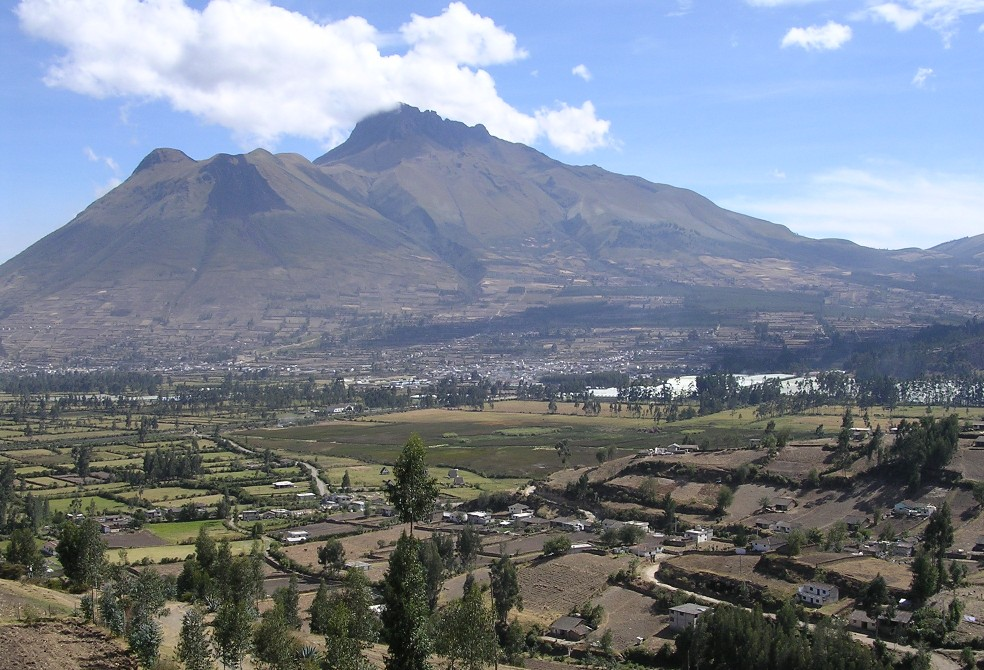
Mount Imbabura (Ecuador) from south-east

The central belt of Ecuador that includes the Andes Mountains, with volcanoes and mountain peaks that sport year-round snow on the equator. Many areas of the Sierra are deforested to make way for agriculture and a number of cut-flower growing operations. At a certain altitude, cloud forests may be found.

The northern Ecuadorian Andes are divided into three parallel cordilleras which run in what is similar to an S-shape from north to south: the western, central (Cordillerra Real) and eastern (Cordillera Occidental) cordilleras. The cordilleras were formed earlier in the Cenozoic era (the current geological era), as the Nazca Plate has subducted underneath the South American Plate and has raised the mountain range. In the south, the cordilleras are not well defined.

Quito, the capital city, is located in a high mountain valley on the foothills of the Pichincha (volcano). The town of Baños de Agua Santa features hot springs swimming pools on the foothills of the Tungurahua in the Central Cordillera. The road from Baños to Puyo has long been known for its narrowness, curves and sheer drops (only one lane in some places, on one area, actually cut into the side of a cliff so that the cliff roofs over it). The most important east–west road across the Andes is the road from Quito to Lago Agrio, which is paved for most of its length yet is heavily by tractor-trailers—and the Trans-Ecuadorian Oil Pipeline serves as the guardrail for long stretches of this road.

==== Notable mountains and Volcanoes ====
Major volcanoes in Ecuador

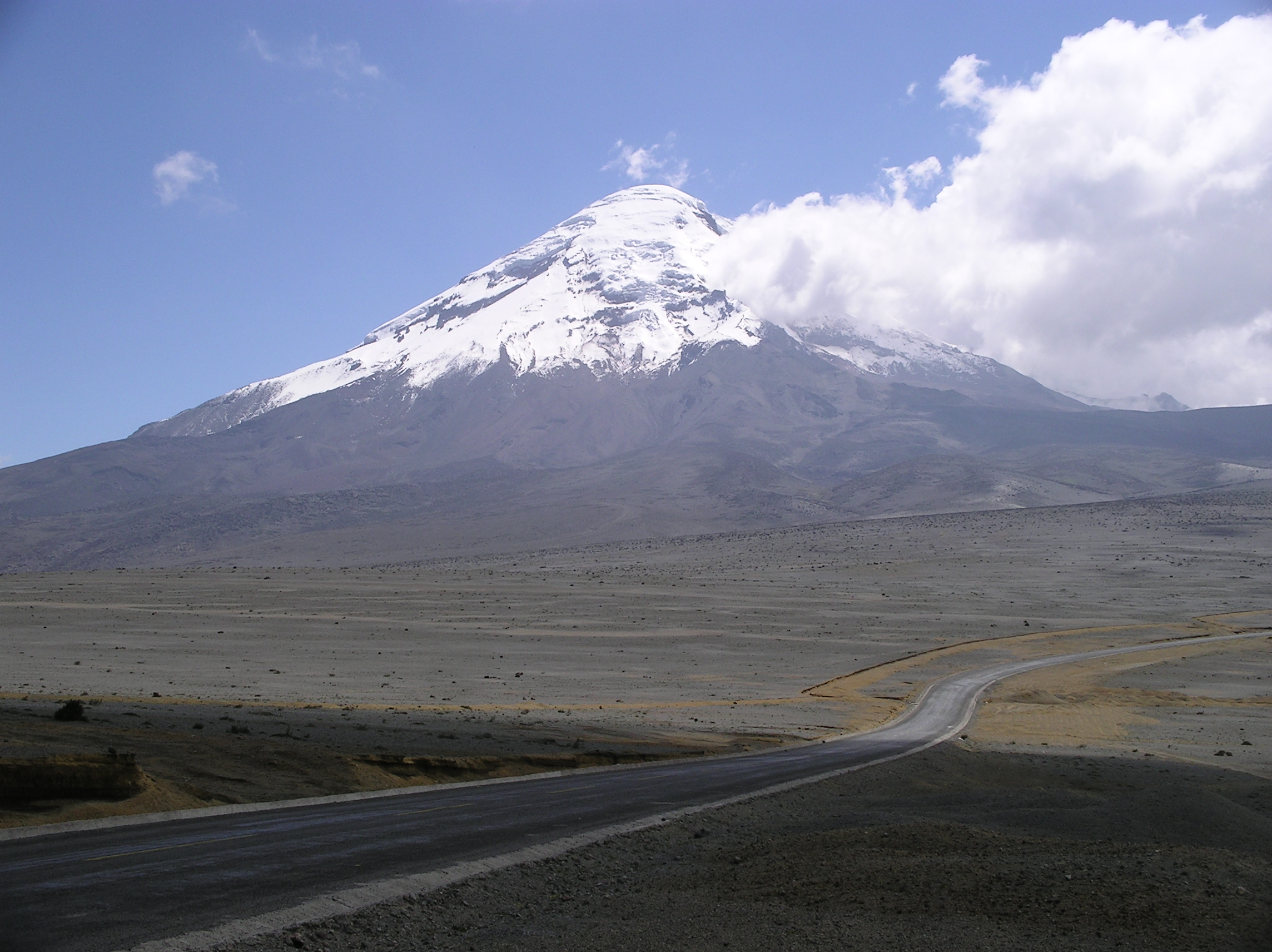
The volcano Chimborazo from the Northwest

- Chimborazo (6,267 metres (20,561 ft)) inactive volcano, the furthest point from the Earth's center.
- Cotopaxi (5,897 metres (19,347 ft)) is the tallest active volcano in the world.
- Illiniza (5,248 metres (17,218 ft))
- Tungurahua (5,023 metres (16,480 ft)) It is an active volcano in eruption since 1998 near Baños-Tunguragua
- Pichincha (4,784 metres (15,696 ft)) volcano overlooking Quito

Partial, incomplete table of volcanoes in the north of the Ecuadorian Andes, from north to south:

West	Interandean	Center	East
Chiles; Yanaurcu; Pichincha; Atacazo; Corazón; Carihuairazo; Chimborazo	Imbabura; Mojanda; Ilaló; Pasochoa; Rumiñahui	Cayambe; Saraurcu; Pambamarca; Filocorrales; Antisana; Sincholahua; Cotopaxi; Tungurahua; Altar	Soche; Sumaco; Reventador; Sangay

=== El Oriente (the East) Amazon Basin ===
Much of the Oriente is tropical moist broadleaf forest (Spanish: la selva), on the east slopes of the Andes Mountains and descending into the Amazon Basin, with strikingly different upland rainforest with steep, rugged ridges and cascading streams (can be seen around Puyo) and lowland rainforest. The oil fields are located in the Amazon basin, headquartered at Lago Agrio; some of the rainforest has been seriously damaged in this region and environmental degradation is severe, with catastrophic oil pollution in some areas. Some 38% of Ecuador's land is forested, and despite a 1.5% annual deforestation rate remains one of the most biodiverse locations on the planet. The Oriente is also home to a large number of Ecuador's indigenous groups, notably the lowland Quechua, Siona, Secoya, Huaorani, and Cofán.

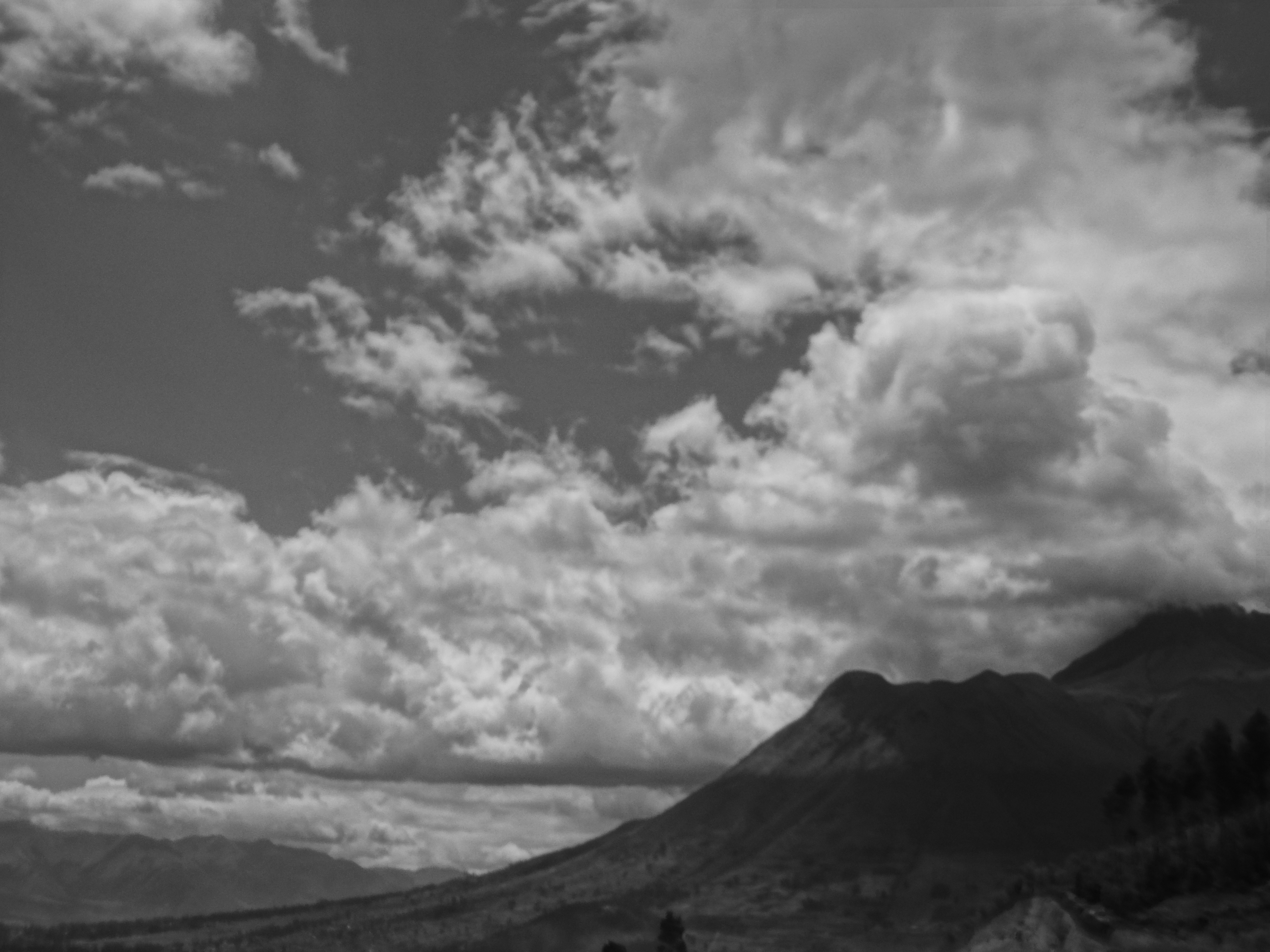
Imbabura Volcano photographed in black and white.

== Drainage ==
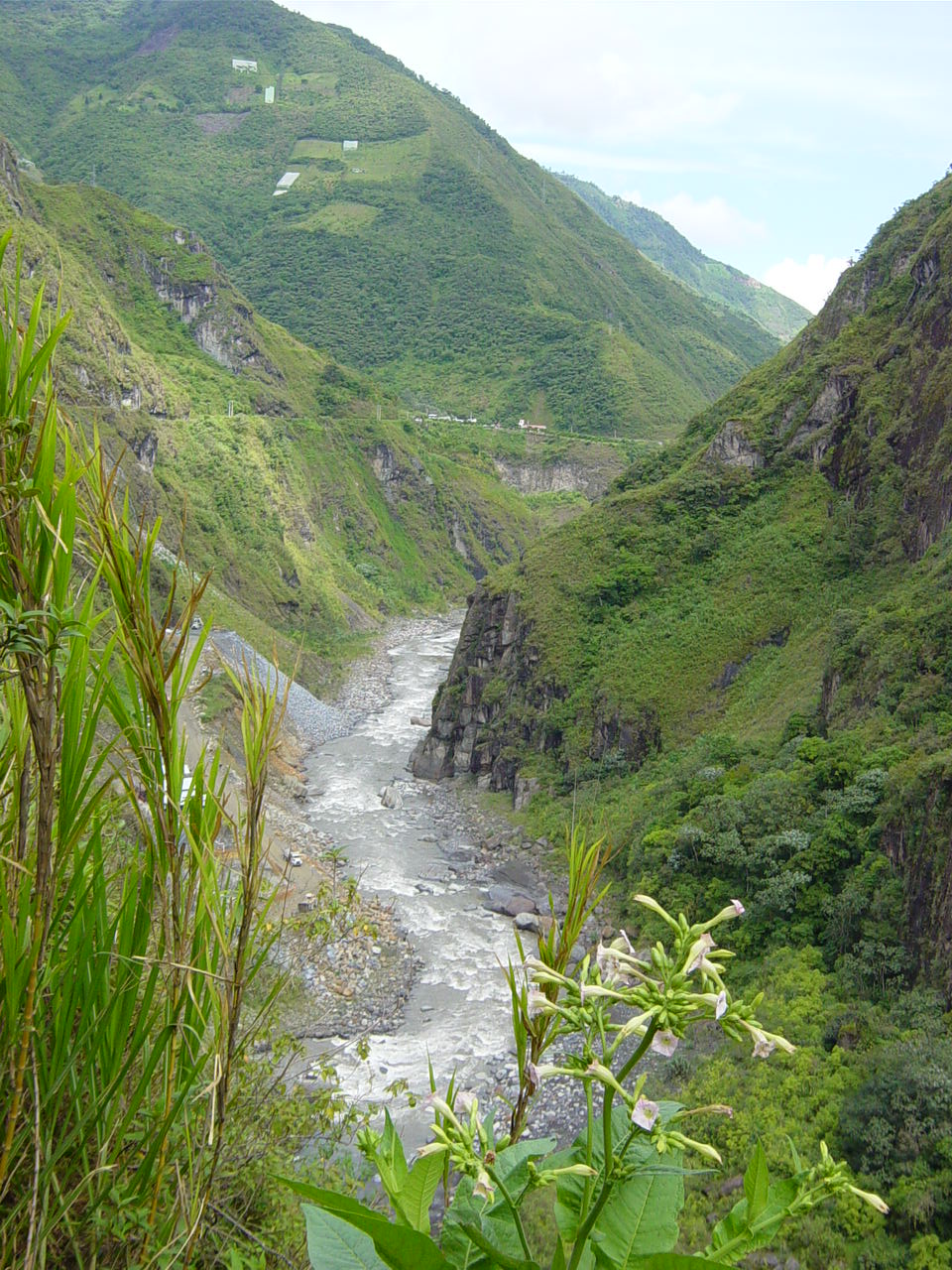
Pastaza River near Baños, Ecuador

Almost all of the rivers in Ecuador rise in the Sierra region and flow east toward the Amazon River or west toward the Pacific Ocean. The rivers rise from snowmelt at the edges of the snowcapped peaks or from the abundant precipitation that falls at higher elevations. In the Sierra region, the streams and rivers are narrow and flow rapidly over precipitous slopes. Rivers may slow and widen as they cross the hoyas yet become rapid again as they flow from the heights of the Andes to the lower elevations of the other regions. The highland rivers broaden as they enter the more level areas of the Costa and the Oriente.

In the Costa region, the Costa Externa has mostly intermittent rivers that are fed by constant rains from December through May and become empty riverbeds during the dry season. The few exceptions are the longer, perennial rivers that flow throughout the Costa Externa from the Costa Internal and the Sierra on their way to the Pacific Ocean. The Costa Internal, by contrast, is crossed by perennial rivers that may flood during the rainy season, sometimes forming swamps.

The Guayas River system, which flows southward to the Gulf of Guayaquil, constitutes the most important of the drainage systems in the Costa Internal. The Guayas River Basin, including land drained by its tributaries, is 40,000 square kilometers in area. The sixty-kilometer-long Guayas River forms just north of Guayaquil out of the confluence of the Babahoyo and Daule rivers. Briefly constricted at Guayaquil by hills, the Guayas widens south of the city and flows through a deltaic network of small islands and channels. At its mouth, the river forms a broad estuary with two channels around Puná Island, the deeper of which is used for navigation.

The second major Costa river system, the Esmeraldas, rises in the Hoya de Quito in the Sierra as the Guayllabamba River and flows westward to empty into the Pacific Ocean near the city of Esmeraldas. The Esmeraldas River is 320 kilometers long and has a 20,000-square-kilometer drainage basin.

Major rivers in the Oriente include the Pastaza, Napo, and Putumayo. The Pastaza is formed by the confluence of the Chambo and the Patate rivers, both of which rise in the Sierra. The Pastaza includes the Agoyan waterfall, which at sixty-one meters (200 feet) is the highest waterfall in Ecuador. The Napo rises near Mount Cotopaxi and is the major river used for transport in the eastern lowlands. The Napo ranges in width from 500 to 1,800 m (1,640 to 5,906 ft). In its upper reaches, the Napo flows rapidly until the confluence with one of its major tributaries, the Coca River, where it slows and levels off. The Putumayo forms part of the border with Colombia. All of these rivers flow into the Amazon River. The Galápagos Islands have no significant rivers. Several of the larger islands, however, have freshwater springs, although they are surrounded by the Pacific Ocean.

== Climate ==
Ecuador map of Köppen climate classification zones

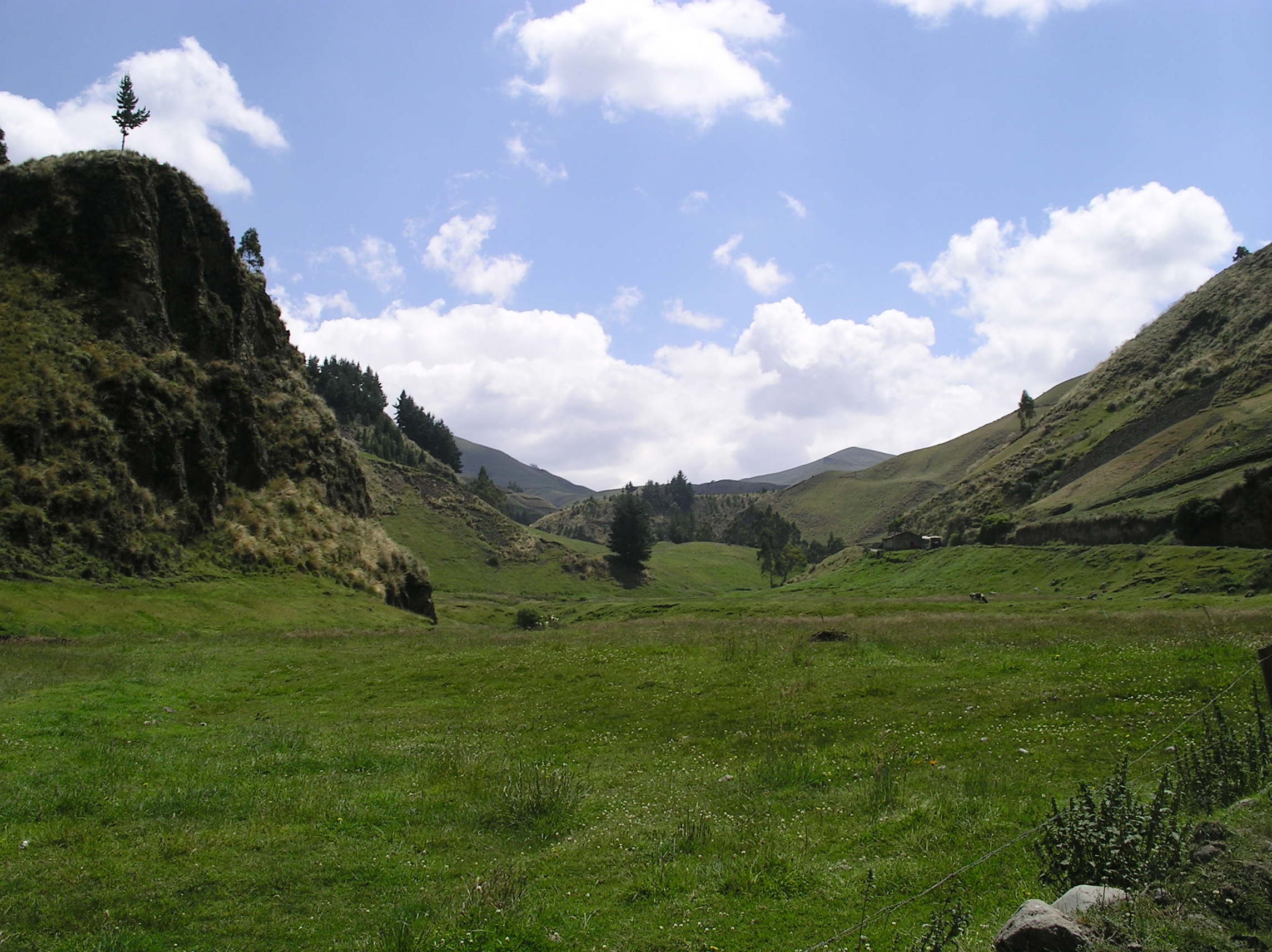
Paramo meadows near Ambato, Ecuador

Each region has different factors that affect its climate. The Costa is influenced primarily by proximity to warm or cool ocean currents. By contrast, climate in the Sierra varies more as a function of altitude. The Oriente has a fairly uniform climate that varies only slightly between the two subregions. Climate in the Galápagos Islands is both moderated by the ocean currents and affected by altitude. Throughout Ecuador variation in rainfall primarily determines seasons. Temperature is determined by altitude. With each ascent of 200 meters (656 ft) in altitude, temperature drops 1 °C (1.8 °F). This phenomenon is particularly significant in the Sierra.

=== The Sierra ===
Temperatures in the Sierra do not vary greatly on a seasonal basis; the hottest month averages 16 °C (60.8 °F) and the coolest month, 13 °C (55.4 °F) in the upper elevations. Diurnal temperatures, however, vary dramatically, from cold mornings to hot afternoons. The almost vertical sun and the rarefied air in the higher Sierra region allow the land to warm quickly during the day and lose heat quickly at night. Mornings typically are bright and sunny, whereas afternoons often are cloudy and rainy. In general, rainfall amounts are highest on exposed locations at lower altitudes. Rain can also vary on a local basis. Sheltered valleys normally receive 500 millimeters (19.7 in) per year, whereas annual rainfall is 1,500 millimeters (59.1 in) in Quito and can reach 2,500 millimeters (98.4 in) on exposed slopes that catch rain-bearing winds. On a seasonal basis, the driest months are June through September.

The climate in the Sierra is divided into levels based on altitude. The tropical level (400 to 1,800 meters [1,312 to 5,906 ft]) has temperatures ranging from 20 to 25 °C (68.0 to 77.0 °F) and heavy precipitation. The subtropical level (1,800 to 2,500 meters [5,906 to 8,202 ft]) has temperatures from 15 to 20 °C (59 to 68 °F) and moderate precipitation. The temperate level (2,500 to 3,200 meters [8,202 to 10,499 ft]) has a year-round temperature in the range of 10 to 15 °C (50 to 59 °F) and an annual rainfall of 1,000 millimeters (39.4 in). The temperate level experiences rainstorms, hailstorms, and fog. Winter, or the rainy season, lasts from January through June, and the dry season or summer from July through December. Most rain falls in April. There also is a short rainy period in early October caused by moisture penetrating the Sierra from the Oriente. Quito and most other populated areas in the Sierra are located at this temperate level. The cold level extends from the temperate zone to 4,650 meters (15,256 ft). Here, average temperatures are 3 to 9 °C (37.4 to 48.2 °F), and the precipitation often appears in the form of rain, hail, and thick fog. Above 4,650 meters (15,256 ft) is the frozen level, where peaks are constantly capped with snow and ice, and temperatures range from below 0 to 3 °C (32.0 to 37.4 °F). Precipitation frequently is in the form of snow, fog, and rain.

=== The Oriente/Amazon ===
The eastern lowlands in the Oriente experience abundant rainfall, especially in the Andean Piedmont, sometimes exceeding 5,000 millimeters (196.9 in) per year. Temperatures average 25 °C (77 °F) in the western parts of this region. The jungle-covered plains of the Eastern lowlands register high levels of rainfall and temperatures surpassing 28 °C (82.4 °F).

Being located on the equator, the Galápagos Islands would have an equatorial climate were it not for the modifying effects of the Peruvian Current. Instead, climate on the islands follows a pattern more like that of the Sierra than the Costa. At sea level, the land is desertlike with temperatures of 21 °C (69.8 °F). The eight summer months experience no precipitation, whereas the winter months of January through April have some fog and drizzle. Above sea level to an altitude of 450 meters (1,476 ft), the islands have a mixture of tropical, subtropical, and temperate climates. In general, temperatures are around 17 °C (62.6 °F). There is constant fog and drizzle in the summer and rain in the winter. The cold level above 450 meters (1,476 ft) has temperatures below 14 °C (57.2 °F). It is cool along the tropical coast.

== Elevation extremes ==
- lowest point: Pacific Ocean 0 m
- highest point: Chimborazo 6,267 m

== Natural resources ==
Ecuador has land which is rich in petroleum. Main fishing products include herring and mackerel. Other natural resources include timber and hydropower.

== Land use ==
- arable land: 4.62%
- permanent crops: 5.57%
- other: 89.81% (2012 est.)

=== Irrigated land ===
8,534 km^{2} (2003)

=== Total renewable water resources ===
424.4 km^{3} (2011)

=== Freshwater withdrawal (domestic/industrial/agricultural) ===
- total: 9.92 km^{3}/yr (13%/6%/81%)
- per capita: 716.1 m^{3}/yr (2005)

== Natural hazards ==
Natural hazards in Ecuador include frequent earthquakes, landslides, volcanic activity; periodic droughts and floods.

== Extreme points ==
- Northernmost point – Darwin Island, Galápagos Islands
- Northernmost point (mainland) –

mouth of Mataje River, Esmeraldas Province

- Southernmost point – Border with Peru, Chinchipe Canton
- Westernmost point – Fernandina Island, Galápagos Islands
- Westernmost point (mainland) – Santa Elena Peninsula, Salinas Canton
- Easternmost point – border with Peru, Orellana Province
- Highest point – Chimborazo: 6,267 m
- Lowest point – Pacific Coast: 0 m
