= List of mountains in Ecuador =

Mountains in Ecuador
Name	Elevation m	Range	Notes
Chimborazo	6,310	Cordillera Occidental	Ecuador's highest mountain
Cotopaxi	5,897	Cordillera Oriental	Active Volcano
Cayambe	5,790	Cordillera Oriental	Active Volcano
Antisana	5,758	Cordillera Oriental	Active Volcano
El Altar/Capac-Urcu	5,319	Cordillera Oriental	
Iliniza Sur	5,248	Cordillera Occidental	
Sangay	5,230	Cordillera Oriental	Active Volcano
Iliniza Norte	5,126	Cordillera Occidental	
Tungurahua	5,023	Cordillera Oriental	Active Volcano
Carihuairazo	5,018	Cordillera Occidental	
Cotacachi	4,944	Cordillera Occidental	Active Volcano
Quilindaña	4,912	Cordillera Oriental	
Sincholagua	4,873	Cordillera Central	
Corazón	4,790	Cordillera Occidental	
Pichincha	4,776	Cordillera Occidental	Active Volcano
Chiles	4,723	Cordillera Occidental	Active Volcano
Rumiñahui	4,722	Interandino	
Imbabura	4,621	Interandino	
Cerro Hermoso	4,571	Cordillera Oriental	
Atacazo	4,455	Cordillera Occidental	
Pasochoa	4,199	Interandino	
Sumaco	3,780	Amazonía	
Reventador	3,562	Amazonía	Active Volcano
