= Mejía Canton =

Coordinates: 0°13′S 78°31′W

Cantón Mejía Mejia Canton
- Canton
- Location of Pichincha Province in Ecuador.

- Mejía Canton in Pichincha Province
- Country: Ecuador
- Province: Pichincha Province
- Capital: Machachi

Area
  - Total: 1,410 km^{2} (540 sq mi)

Population (2022 census)
  - Total: 101,894
  - Density: 72.3/km^{2} (187/sq mi)
- Time zone: UTC-5 (ECT)

Mejía is a canton in the province of Pichincha in northern Ecuador. It is named after Ecuadorian political figure José Mejía Lequerica. The canton includes a volcano in the Central Cordillera of the Ecuadorian Andes called Rumiñahui. The seat of the canton is called Machachi.

Machachi is located to the south of the capital of Ecuador, Quito. It is a beautiful city surrounded by the volcanos Atacazo, Corazon, Rumiñahui, Illinizas peaks, Viudita hill, Pasochoa, Sincholagua and the Cotopaxi volcano, an active volcano which measures 5,897 m (19,347 ft) in altitude. The valley contains 8 volcanoes, the reason why Alexander von Humboldt named the region Avenue of Volcanoes.

In the Panzaleo language, Machachi means "Great active land." Machachi is the cradle of many slopes, and the same ground is a perennial thermal and mineral water outcrop. In the fertile valleys of San Pedro there are approximately 22 sources of chemicals which have invaluable theurapeutical properties.

Machachi has a similar temperature to Quito, fluctuating from 19°C (66°F) average high to 10°C (50°F) average low. These averages are for the whole year with the dry months being June, July and August.

== See also ==
- Cotopaxi National Park
- Illinizas Ecological Reserve
- Pasochoa Wildlife Refuge
