= Machachi =

- City
- Location within Ecuador
- Coordinates: 0°30′36″S 78°34′12″W
- Country: Ecuador
- Province: Pichincha
- Canton: Mejía

Area
  - City: 6.09 km^{2} (2.35 sq mi)
- Elevation: 2,886 m (9,469 ft)

Population (2022 census)
  - City: 24,188
  - Density: 3,970/km^{2} (10,300/sq mi)
- Climate: Cfb

Machachi is the canton seat of Mejía Canton in the Pichincha province of Ecuador.

Machachi is located to the south of the capital of Ecuador, Quito. It is a city surrounded by the volcanos Atacazo, Corazon, Rumiñahui, Illinizas Peaks, Viudita Hill, Pasochoa, and Sincholagua, and owns part of the Cotopaxi volcano, a great active volcano which measures 5,897 m (19,347 ft) in altitude. In fact, the valley owns eight volcanoes inside, one the reasons Alexander von Humboldt named the region "Avenue of Volcanoes".

In the Panzaleo language, it means great active land. Machachi is the cradle of many slopes and the same ground is a perennial thermal and mineral water outcrop. In the fertile valleys of San Pedro are about 22 sources of chemicals which have theurapeutical properties.

Machachi has a similar temperature to Quito, fluctuating from 19 °C (66 °F) average high to 10 °C (50 °F) average low; these averages are for the whole year, with the dry months being June, July, and August.

== Climate ==
Climate data for Machachi, elevation 2,950 m (9,680 ft), (1961–1990)
Month	Jan	Feb	Mar	Apr	May	Jun	Jul	Aug	Sep	Oct	Nov	Dec	Year
Mean daily maximum °C (°F)	18.6 (65.5)	18.2 (64.8)	18.0 (64.4)	18.1 (64.6)	18.6 (65.5)	18.1 (64.6)	18.7 (65.7)	19.0 (66.2)	18.8 (65.8)	18.5 (65.3)	18.2 (64.8)	18.6 (65.5)	18.5 (65.2)
Daily mean °C (°F)	12.8 (55.0)	12.6 (54.7)	12.6 (54.7)	12.6 (54.7)	12.8 (55.0)	12.6 (54.7)	12.6 (54.7)	13.0 (55.4)	12.8 (55.0)	12.5 (54.5)	12.5 (54.5)	12.8 (55.0)	12.7 (54.8)
Mean daily minimum °C (°F)	5.1 (41.2)	5.5 (41.9)	5.4 (41.7)	5.5 (41.9)	6.0 (42.8)	5.3 (41.5)	5.3 (41.5)	5.1 (41.2)	5.1 (41.2)	4.9 (40.8)	4.6 (40.3)	5.1 (41.2)	5.2 (41.4)
Average precipitation mm (inches)	85.0 (3.35)	105.0 (4.13)	120.0 (4.72)	108.0 (4.25)	75.0 (2.95)	58.0 (2.28)	30.0 (1.18)	40.0 (1.57)	70.0 (2.76)	84.0 (3.31)	86.0 (3.39)	81.0 (3.19)	942 (37.08)
Source: FAO

== See also ==
- Cotopaxi National Park
- Illinizas Ecological Reserve
- Pasochoa Wildlife Refuge
