= Chimborazo =

Volcano and highest mountain in Ecuador

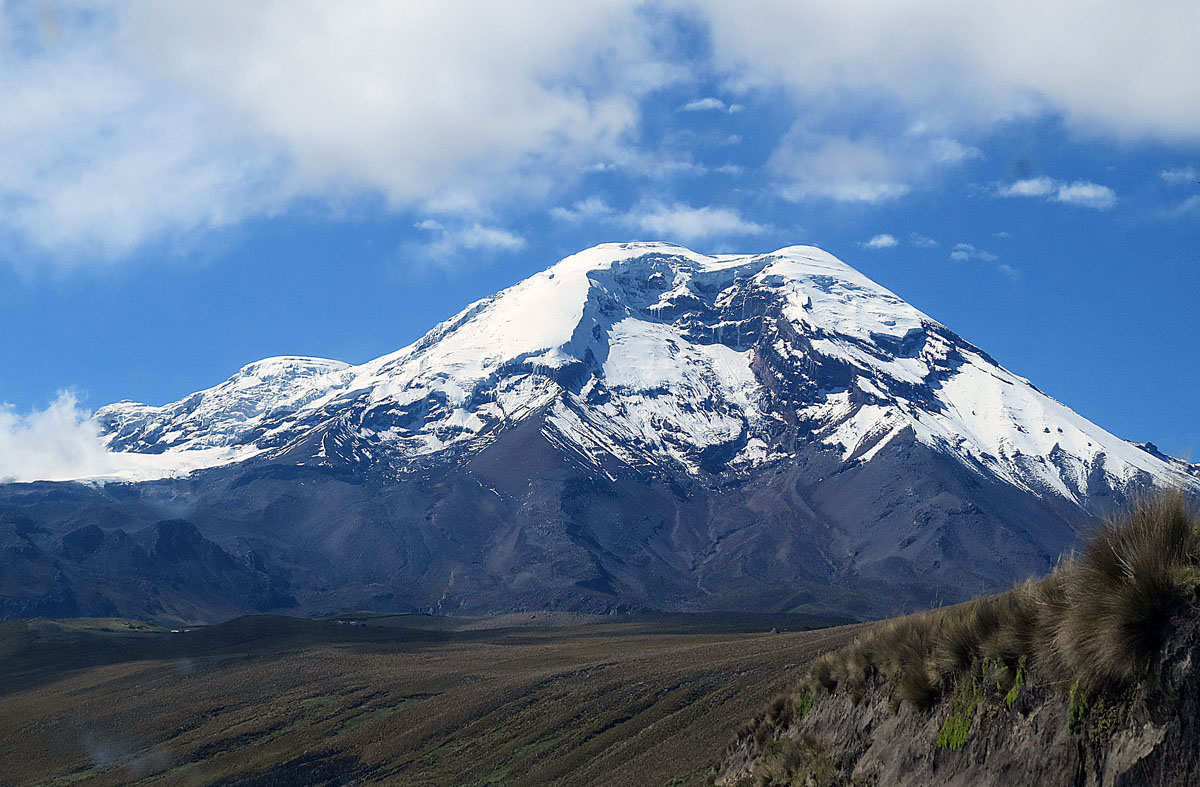
- The summit of Chimborazo, the point on the Earth's surface that is farthest from the Earth's center

Highest point
- Elevation: 6,263.47 m (20,549.4 ft) (Note: The elevation given here was established by a GPS survey in February 2016. The survey was carried out by a team from the French Research Institute for Development, working in cooperation with the Ecuadorian Military Geographic Institute.)
- Prominence: 4,118 m (13,510 ft); Ranked 18th
- Listing: Country high point Ultra
- Coordinates: 1°28′09″S 78°49′03″W

Geography
- Location within Ecuador
- Country: Ecuador
- Province: Chimborazo
- Parent range: Andes, Cordillera Occidental
- Topo map(s): IGM, CT-ÑIV-C1

Geology
- Rock age: Paleogene
- Mountain type: Stratovolcano
- Last eruption: 550 AD ± 150 years

Climbing
- Easiest route: Glacier/snow climb PD

Chimborazo (Spanish: [tʃimboˈɾaso]) is a stratovolcano in Ecuador and the Cordillera Occidental range of the Andes. Its last known eruption is believed to have occurred around AD 550.

Chimborazo is the highest mountain in Ecuador and the 39th-highest peak in the entire Andes. Although not the tallest mountain on Earth relative to sea level—it reaches a height of 6,263 m (20,548 ft), well below that of Mount Everest at 8,849 m (29,032 ft)—its summit is the farthest point on Earth's surface from its center due to its location along the equatorial bulge.

== Etymology ==
Several theories regarding the origin of the name Chimborazo exist. In many dialects of Quechua, "chimba" means "on the other side" as in "on the other side of the river" or "on the opposite bank". Other dialects pronounce this word "chimpa". Also, "razu" means "ice" or "snow". Local Quichua speakers say that Chimborazo is a Hispanicized pronunciation of "chimbarazu", meaning "the snow on the other side". Another theory suggests it is a combination of the Cayapa Schingbu for Women and the Colorado/Quichua Razo for Ice/Snow resulting in Women of Ice. According to another, Chimbo is Shuar for Throne of Master/God resulting in Icethrone of God. The locals also used to call the mountain Urcurazu, with the Quichua Urcu for Mountain resulting in Mountain of Ice. In local indigenous mysticism, Chimborazo represents Taita (Father) whereas neighbouring Tungurahua is seen as Mama, and Guagua (Child) for Pichincha hence Taita Chimborazo, Mama Tungurahua and Guagua Pichincha.

== Geography ==
=== Location ===
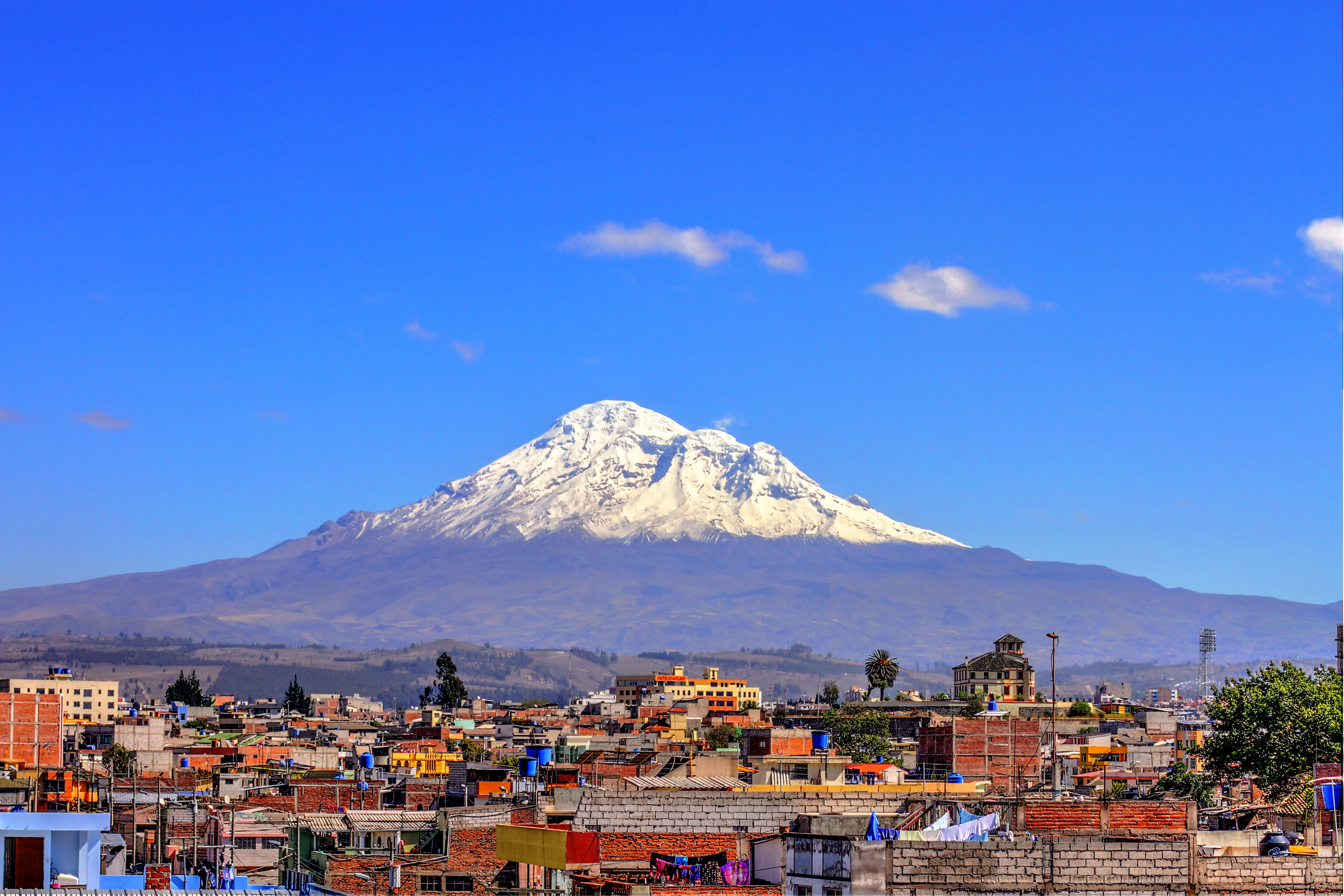
Chimborazo seen from Riobamba in Ecuador

Chimborazo is in the Chimborazo Province of Ecuador, 150 km (93 mi) south-southwest of the city of Quito, Ecuador. It is a neighbor to 5,018 m (16,463 ft) high Carihuairazo, another inactive stratovolcano. Chimborazo's summit rises 2,500 m (8,202 ft) above the surrounding highlands (~3,500 to 4,000 m (11,483 to 13,123 ft)) with a ≈20 km (12 mi) wide base.

Under clear conditions, the summit of Chimborazo can be seen from the coastal city Guayaquil, nearly 140 km (87 mi) away. The nearest cities are Riobamba (~30 km to the southeast), Ambato (~30 km to the northeast) and Guaranda (~25 km to the southwest). Chimborazo is surrounded by the Reserva de Producción Faunistica Chimborazo, which forms a protected ecosystem to preserve the habitat for the Andes native camelids of vicuña, llama and alpaca.

Chimborazo is at the main end of the Ecuadorian Volcanic Arc, northwest of the town of Riobamba. Chimborazo is in la Avenida de los Volcanes (the Avenue of Volcanoes) west of the Sanancajas mountain chain. Carihuairazo, Tungurahua, Tulabug, and El Altar are all mountains that neighbor Chimborazo. The closest mountain peak, Carihuairazo, is 5.8 mi (9.3 km) from Chimborazo. There are many microclimates near Chimborazo, varying from desert in the Arenal to the humid mountains in the Abraspungo valley.

=== Glaciers ===
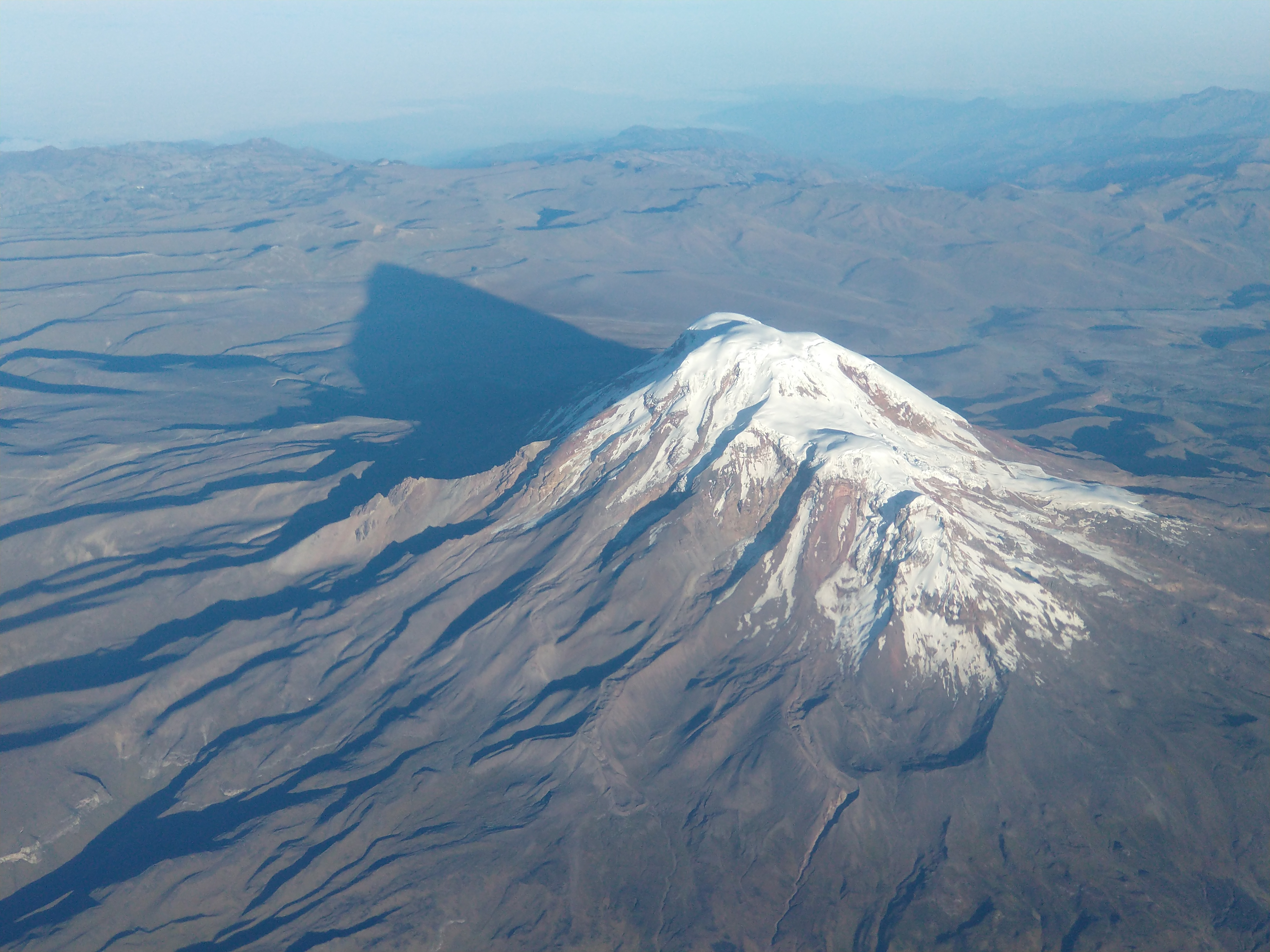
Aerial view of Chimborazo's glacier-covered summits casting a shadow over the Gran Arenal, the alpine desert to Chimborazo's west.

The top of Chimborazo is covered by glaciers, with some northeastern glacier arms flowing down to 4,600 m. Its glacier is the source of water for the population of the Bolivar and Chimborazo provinces of Ecuador. Chimborazo glacier's ice mass has decreased over the past decades, which is thought to be due in part to ash cover from recent volcanic activity (Note: Tungurahua's recent activity period started in 1999 with the most significant eruptions between October and December 1999 and May and July 2006.) at Tungurahua.

Recent geographical research has used Chimborazo as a case study for understanding tropical glacier retreat and local water-resource vulnerability in the central Ecuadorian Andes. A 2017 study by Jeff La Frenierre and Bryan G. Mark combined meteorological records, glacier-change analysis, and local observations. The authors found evidence of warming between 1986 and 2011, while residents interviewed in the region reported reduced rainfall and lower surface-water availability. This makes Chimborazo important not only as a volcanic and geodetic landmark, but also as a place where changes in high-mountain ice can affect nearby communities that depend on Andean water systems.

Chimborazo's glacial ice is mined by locals (the so-called Hieleros from Spanish Hielo for Ice) to be sold in the markets of Guaranda and Riobamba. In earlier days, the people transported ice for cooling uses down to coastal towns such as Babahoyo or Vinces.

=== Elevation ===
With an elevation of 6,263 m (20,548 ft), Chimborazo is the highest mountain in Ecuador and the Andes north of Peru; it is higher than any more northerly summit in the Americas.

=== Farthest point from Earth's center ===
While Everest is Earth's highest elevation (green) and Mauna Kea is tallest from its base (orange), Cayambe is farthest from Earth's axis (pink) and Chimborazo is farthest from Earth's centre (blue). Not to scale

The summit of Mount Everest is higher above sea level, but the summit of Chimborazo is widely reported to be the farthest point on the surface from Earth's center, (Note: A diagram that compares the height of Chimborazo and Mount Everest could be found in "What is the highest point on Earth as measured from Earth's center?". U.S. National Oceanic and Atmospheric Administration. Archived from the original on 2016-05-28.) with Huascarán in Peru a very close second.

As a result of the oblate spheroid shape of the planet Earth, which is thicker at the Equator than it is from pole to pole, the summit of Chimborazo is the fixed point on Earth that has the utmost distance from the center. (Note: Resolving this issue definitively has been problematic due to error margins in both summit elevations and geoid data. Application of the formula at Earth radius#Radius at a given geodetic latitude shows that the Earth's radius is 520 metres (1,710 ft) greater at Chimborazo than at Huascaran, with most recent data showing another 5 metres (16 ft) due to local variations in gravity, for a total of 525 metres (1,722 ft). Two heights are given for Huascarán - 6,746 m (22,133 ft) from the Peruvian National Geographic Institute (IGN) map, and 6,768 m (22,205 ft) from the Austrian Alpine Club (OeAV) survey map. Chimbaro is now 6,263 m (20,548 ft). Thus Chimborazo's summit is roughly either 20 metres (66 ft) or 40 metres (130 ft) further from the Earth's center than that of Huascaran.) Chimborazo is one degree south of the Equator and the Earth's diameter at the Equator is greater than at the latitude of Everest (8,848 m (29,029 ft) above sea level), nearly 28° north, with sea level also elevated. Despite being 2,585 m (8,481 ft) lower in elevation above sea level, it is 6,384.4 km (3,967.1 mi) from the Earth's center, 2.1 km (1.3 mi) farther than the summit of Everest (6,382.3 km (3,965.8 mi) from the Earth's center). (Note: In this ranking, several other Andean peaks as well as Africa's highest mountain, Kilimanjaro, exceed Everest.) However, by height above sea level, Chimborazo is not the highest peak of the Andes.

Centrifugal force from the Earth's rotation, and distance from the center of the Earth, cause the force of gravity to be slightly reduced near the equator. The summit of Chimborazo has about one percent less gravity than the point with the highest gravitational force. Yet, due to its height above the surrounding terrain and local gravity anomalies, the summit of Huascarán is the place on Earth with the smallest gravitational force.

== Geology ==
Chimborazo is an ice-capped inactive volcano. It is a double volcano composed of one volcanic edifice on top of another. Chimborazo shows four summits; Whymper, Veintimilla, Politecnica, and Nicolas Martínez. The Whymper peak is the highest point on the mountain at 6,263 meters. The Veintimilla peak is about 6,234 m (20,453 ft) high. The Politecnica peak is 5,820 m (19,094 ft) high. The last peak, Nicolas Martínez, is 5,570 m (18,274 ft) high and was named after the father of Ecuadorian mountaineering. The volcano is categorized as a stratovolcano. This type of volcano is characterized as having low slopes at the bottom that gradually get steeper the higher up the mountain. Chimborazo has a circumference of 78 miles (126 km) and a diameter of 30 miles (48 km). Chimborazo's upper elevations are covered in glaciers that are decreasing in size due to climate change and falling ash from the nearby volcano, Tungurahua. In addition to the glaciers, the volcano is covered with craters. The volcano is dominantly andesitic to dacitic. This means that the lava is blocky, or flowing down the sides of the volcano, or somewhere in between.

Chimborazo is 73.5 meters higher than the highest mountain in North America. Chimborazo is often associated with the nearby volcano Cotopaxi, although the two volcanoes have completely different structures.

== Volcanism ==
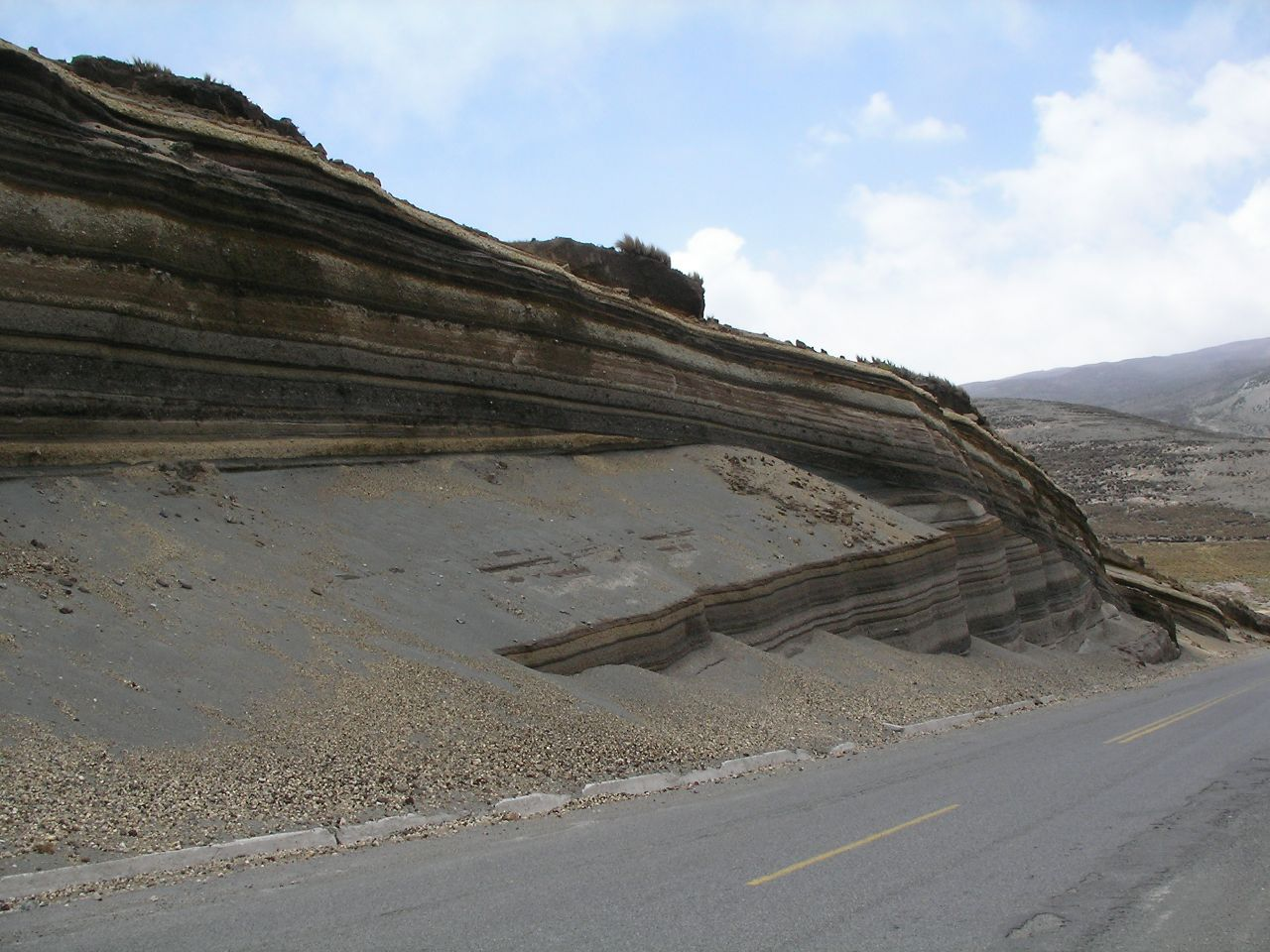
Layers of pyroclastic rock deposited during eruptions of Chimborazo

Chimborazo is a dominantly andesitic-dacitic stratovolcano. About 35,000 years ago a collapse of Chimborazo produced a debris avalanche with an average thickness of forty meters, which underlies the city of Riobamba. It temporarily dammed the Río Chambo, causing an ephemeral lake.

Chimborazo then erupted several times during the Holocene, the last time around 550 AD ± 150 years. The eruptions after the collapse were primarily andesitic, or blocky, coagulated lava flow. These eruptions produced pyroclastic surges that went down as far as 3800 meters altitude.

== Surveys and expeditions ==
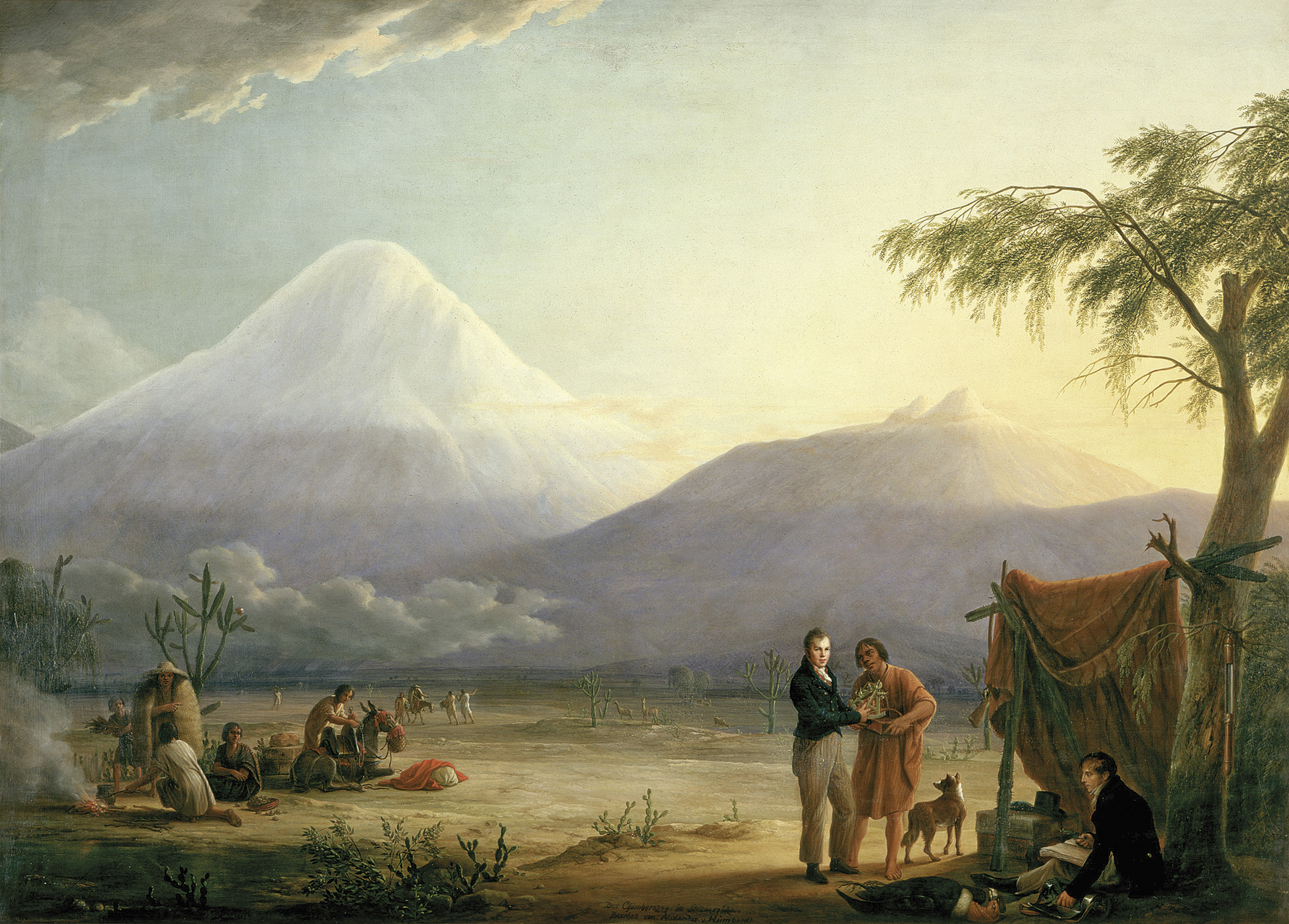
Alexander von Humboldt and his fellow scientist Aimé Bonpland at the foot of the Chimborazo volcano, painting by Friedrich Georg Weitsch (1810)

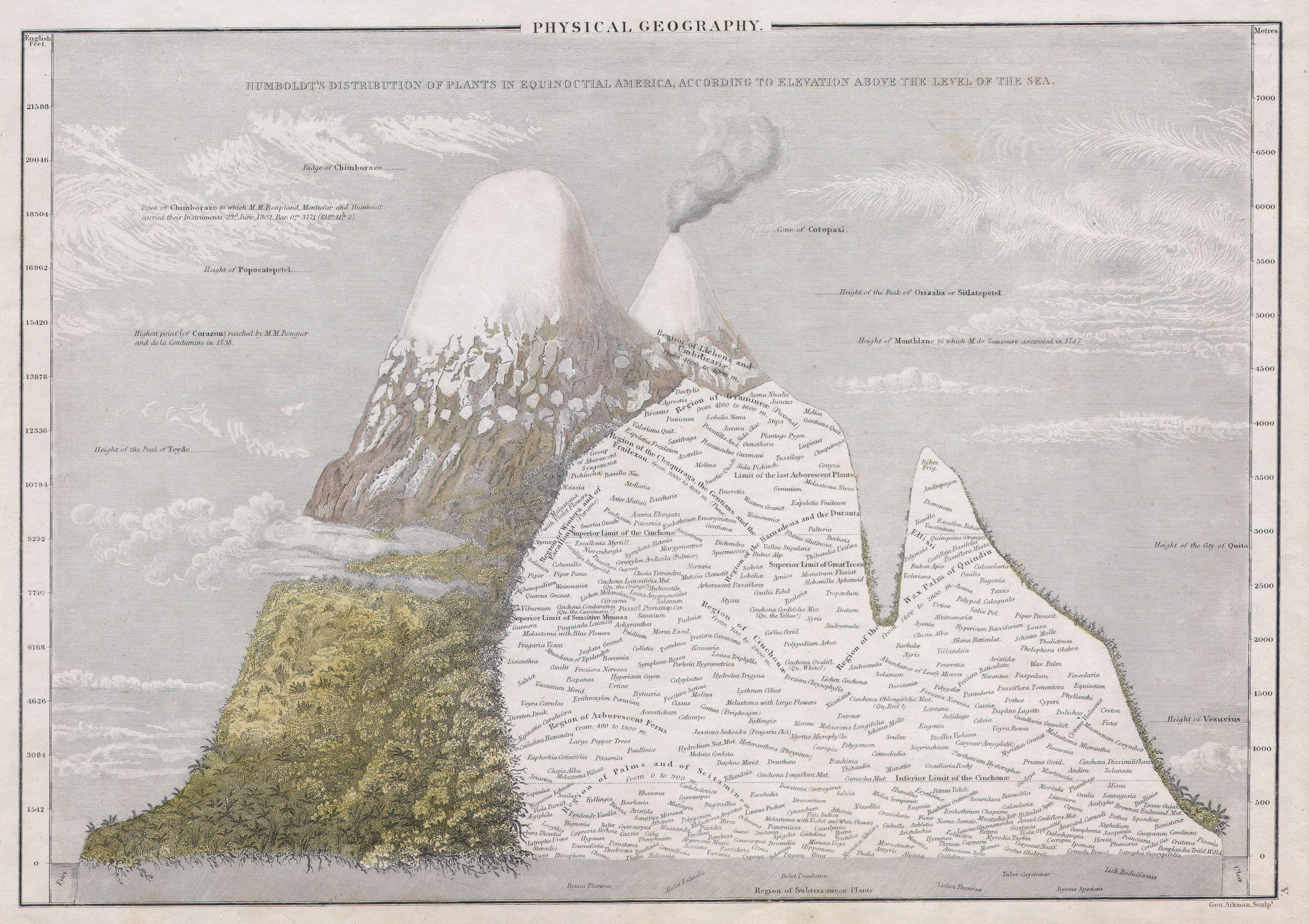
Map from 1839 of the distribution of plants according to elevation in the Americas

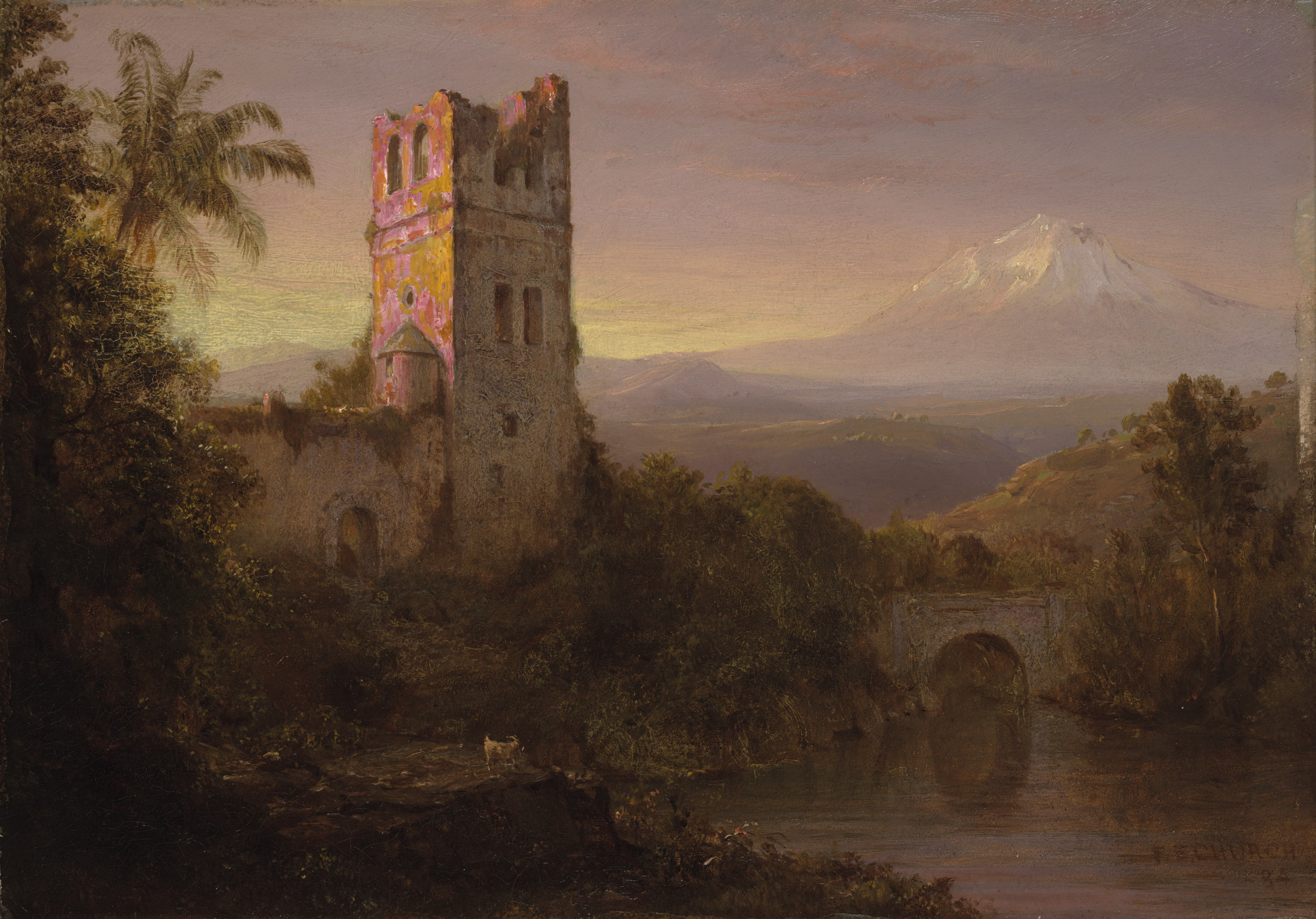
Chimborazo volcano in 1884 by Frederic Edwin Church

Until the beginning of the 19th century, it was thought that Chimborazo was the highest mountain on Earth (measured from sea level), and such reputation led to many attempts on its summit during the 17th and 18th centuries.

In 1746, the volcano was explored by French academicians from the French Geodesic Mission. Their mission was to determine the sphericity of the Earth. Their work along with another team in Lapland established that the Earth was an oblate spheroid rather than a true sphere. They did not reach the summit of Chimborazo.

In June 1802, during his expedition to South America, the Prussian-born traveler Alexander von Humboldt, accompanied by the French botanist Aimé Bonpland and the Ecuadorian Carlos Montúfar, tried to reach the summit. From his description of the mountain, it seems that before he and his companions had to return suffering from altitude sickness they reached a point at 5,875 m, higher than previously attained by any European in recorded history (Incans had reached much higher altitudes previously; see Llullaillaco). In 1831, Jean-Baptiste Boussingault and Colonel Hall reached a new "highest point", estimated to be 6,006 m. Other failed attempts to reach the summit followed.

On 4 January 1880, the English climber Edward Whymper reached the summit of Chimborazo. The route that Whymper took up the mountain is now known as the Whymper route. As there were many critics who doubted that Whymper had reached the summit, later in the same year he climbed to the summit again, choosing a different route (Pogyos) with the Ecuadorians David Beltrán and Francisco Campaña.

=== SAETA Flight 232 ===
In August 1976, SAETA Flight 232 carrying 55 passengers and four crew members aboard a Vickers Viscount from Quito to Cuenca disappeared en route. In February 2003, after almost 27 years, the aircraft was found with the bodies of its 59 occupants at an elevation of 5,310 meters (17,420 ft) on Chimborazo by Ecuadorian climbers, on the rarely used eastern route Integral.

== Mountaineering ==
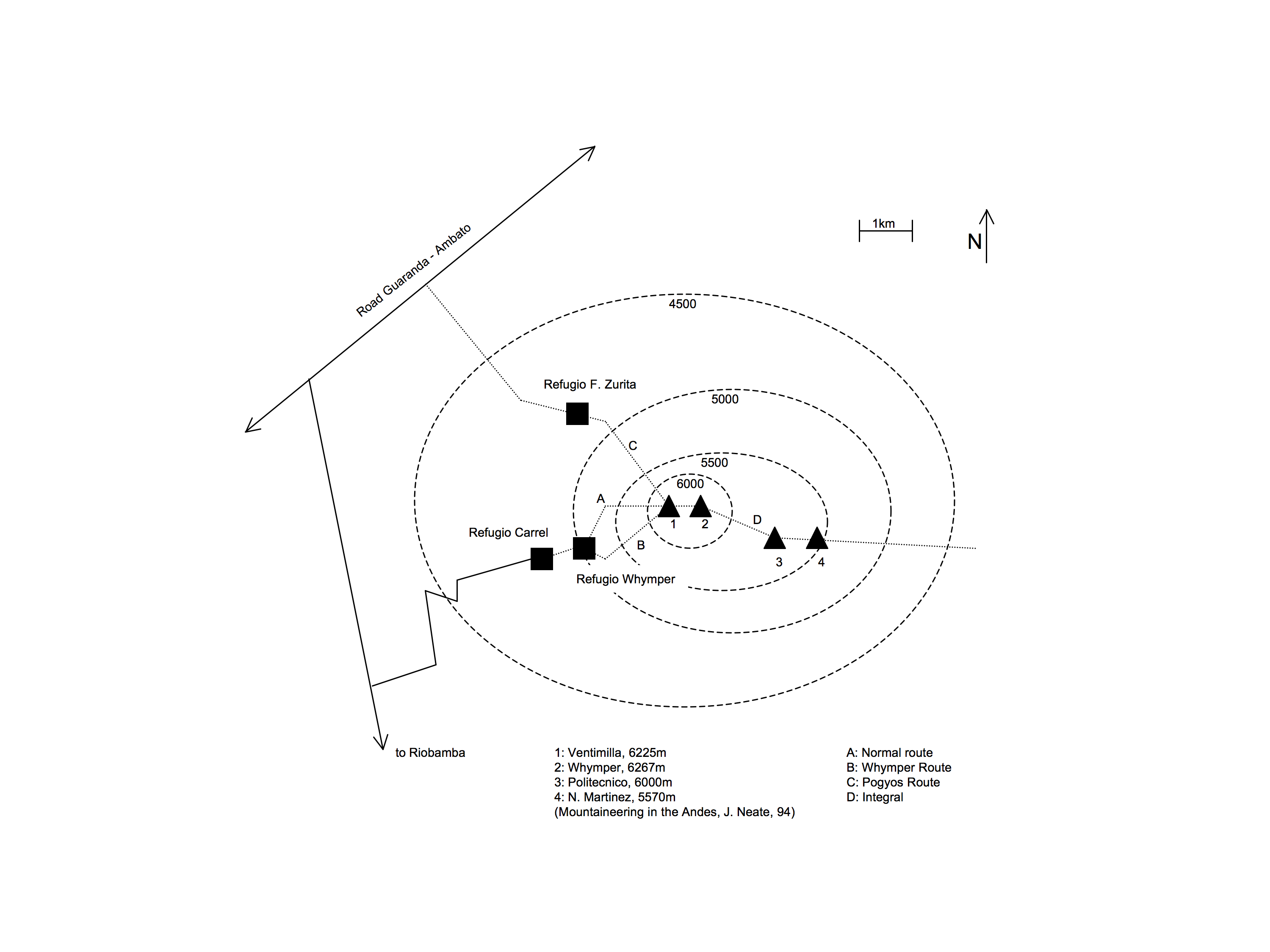
Sketch of Chimborazo huts, main summits, and routes

As Ecuador's highest mountain, Chimborazo is a popular climb and can be climbed year-round with the best seasons being December–January and June-July.

=== Routes ===
The easiest (IFAS Grade: PD) and most climbed routes are the Normal and the Whymper routes. Both are western ridge routes starting at the Whymper hut and leading via the Ventemilla summit to the main (Whymper) summit. There are several other less used and more challenging routes on the mountain's other faces and ridges leading to one of Chimborazo's summits: Main (Whymper, Ecuador), Politecnico (Central), N. Martinez (Eastern). The mountain is contained on the IGM (Instituto Geografico Militar) 1:50000 Map Chimborazo (CT-ÑIV-C1).

=== Huts ===
There are two functioning huts, the Carrel Hut (4,850 m) and the nearby Whymper Hut (5,000 m). The Carrel Hut can be reached by car from Riobamba, Ambato or Guaranda. On the northwest side there is the now defunct Zurita hut (4,900 m), which served as base for the Pogyos route.

=== Climbing ===
El Castillo is the most popular route up the volcano. This route is usually climbed from December to February and June to September. This route involves climbing the west side of the volcano. The route starts at Whymper hut to a saddle above El Castillo. From the saddle, there is a glacier ridge. Then climbers go to the Veintemilla summit. Veintemilla summit is often the turnaround point for climbers. There is a 30-minute snow-filled basin between Veintemilla summit and Whymper summit. Whymper summit is the highest point of the mountain. The El Castillo route takes around eight to twelve hours to ascend and about three to five hours to descend. Climbing Chimborazo is dangerous due to the risk of avalanches, the severe weather conditions, and the fact that it is covered in glaciers. Climbing begins at night in order to reach the summit before sunrise when the snow melts, which increases the chance of avalanche and rockfall. Crampons and other technical climbing equipment are required.

On November 10, 1993 three parties of climbers, one ascending and two descending, were caught in an avalanche on the steep slopes below the Veintimilla summit. This avalanche buried ten climbers in a crevasse at 18,700 feet (5,700 m). These climbers comprised six French, two Ecuadorians, one Swiss, and one Chilean. After the ten climbers were buried in snow, it took twenty people and ten days to find their bodies. This was considered the worst climbing accident in Ecuador. Nearly thirty years later, a similar accident occurred on October 24, 2021. An avalanche swept 16 climbers at 6,100 m (20,000ft), killing six.

== Cultural references ==
- Chimborazo is featured on the Ecuadorian coat of arms, to represent the beauty and richness of the Ecuadorian Sierra (Highlands).
- Simón Bolívar's poem, "Mi delirio sobre el Chimborazo", was inspired by the mountain.
- In his central essay "The Poet", Ralph Waldo Emerson uses the Chimborazo as metaphor for the poet (and the creative genius in general), who "must stand out of our low limitations".
- Walter J. Turner's poem "Romance" contains the couplet "Chimborazo, Cotopaxi/They had stolen my soul away!"
- The American landscape painter Frederick Edwin Church features the Chimborazo in the background of his famous work The Heart of the Andes (1859) as well as in his painting Chimborazo (1864).
- Miguel Ángel León wrote a poem entitled "Canto al Chimborazo" (Song to Chimborazo).
- David Weber's novel The Armageddon Inheritance mentions Mount Chimborazo as the site for a massive planetary defense installation.
- American Dad! season 21, episode four is centered around the family's trip to Ecuador to climb Mount Chimborazo after Stan cannot afford to take them to Mount Everest. Chimborazo's summit height due to the equatorial bulge is mentioned frequently throughout the episode.
- Rafael Salas “Vista del Chimborazo” 1870-1880. Oil paintings.

== See also ==
- Lists of volcanoes
  - List of volcanoes in Ecuador
- List of mountains in the Andes
- List of Ultras of South America
- List of mountains in Ecuador
