= Cotopaxi National Park =

Protected area in Ecuador

- IUCN category II (national park)
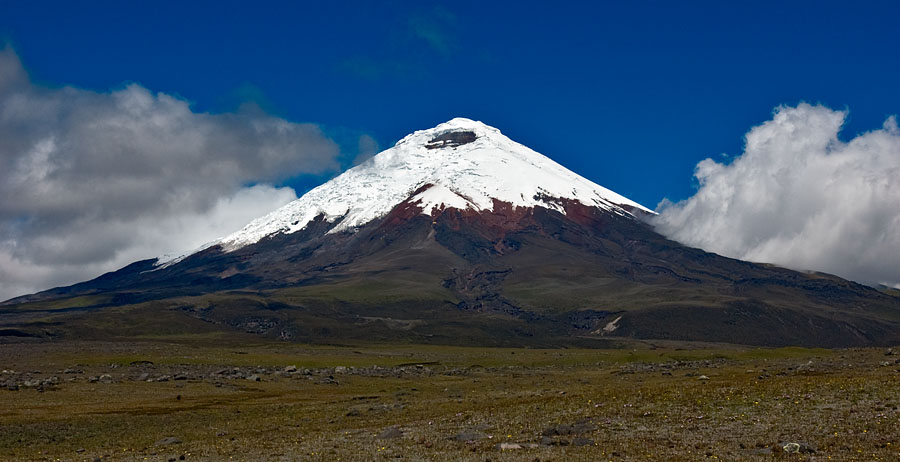
- Cotopaxi volcano

- Location within Ecuador
- Location: Ecuador; Cotopaxi Province, Napo Province and Pichincha Province
- Coordinates: 0°41′3″S 78°26′14″W
- Area: 33,393 ha (82,520 acres)
- Established: 11 August 1975
- Governing body: Ministerio del Ambiente

Cotopaxi National Park (Spanish: Parque Nacional Cotopaxi) is a protected area in Ecuador situated in the Cotopaxi, Napo and Pichincha provinces, roughly 50 km (31 mi) south of Quito. The Cotopaxi volcano (meaning 'smooth neck of the moon' in Quechua; Quechua q'oto 'throat' + Aymara phakhsi 'moon') that lends its name to the park is located within its boundaries, together with two others: the dormant Rumiñawi volcano to its north-west and the historical Sincholagua volcano (last major eruption: 1877) to the south-east. Cotopaxi is among the highest active volcanoes in the world. Its most recent eruption began on 14 August 2015, and ended on 24 January 2016.
