= Carihuairazo =

Inactive stratovolcano in the Ecuadorian Andes

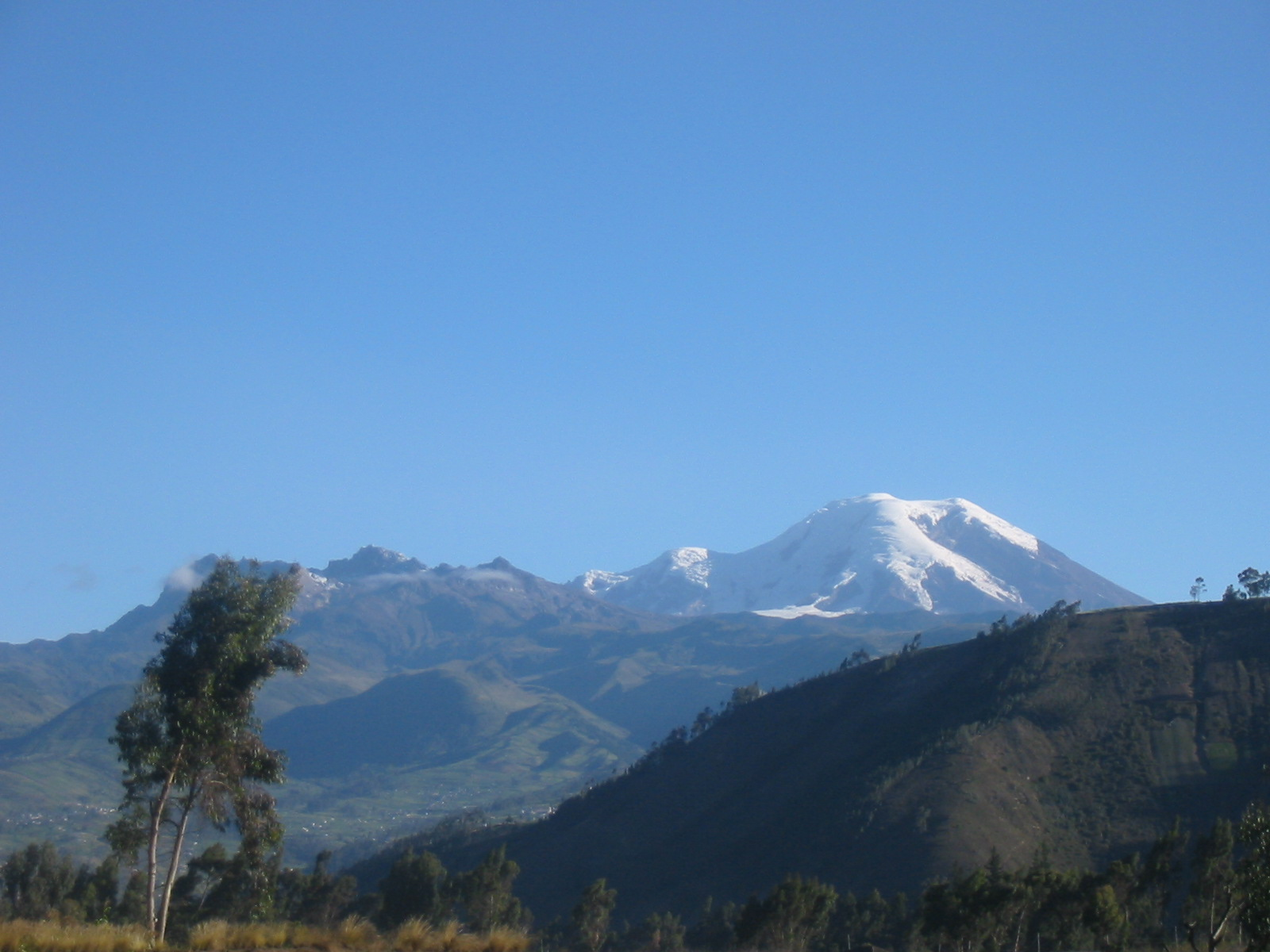
- Carihuayrazo left of bigger Chimborazo as seen from the north

Highest point
- Elevation: 5,018 m (16,463 ft)
- Prominence: 638 m (2,093 ft)
- Coordinates: 01°24′25″S 78°45′00″W

Geography
- Location within Ecuador
- Location: Ecuador
- Parent range: Andes, Cordillera Occidental
- Topo map(s): IGM, CT-ÑIV-C1

Geology
- Rock age: Paleogene (Gomez 1994)
- Mountain type: Stratovolcano
- Last eruption: Unknown

Climbing
- First ascent: 1951 A. Eichler, H.L. Uribe, J. Morawiecki
- Easiest route: glacier/snow/rock climb AD

Mount Carihuairazo (also Carihuayrazo) is an eroded stratovolcano neighboured by Ecuador's highest mountain Chimborazo.

== Geography ==
=== Location ===
Carihuairazo is located in the Cordillera Occidental of the Andes of central Ecuador, 150 km (93 mi) south-southwest of the capital Quito. Its neighboured by 6,263 m high Chimborazo. The nearest cities are Riobamba (~30 km to the southeast), Ambato (~30 km to the northeast) and Guaranda (~30 km to the southwest). Carihuairazo's 1.5 km wide heavy eroded caldera opens to the east.

The Carihuairazo forms part of the "Reserva de Produccion Faunistica Chimborazo" which forms a protected ecosystem to preserve the habitat for the andens native camelids Vicuña, Llama and Alpaca.

=== Glacier ===
Carihuairazo's Glacier lost almost all of its mass during the last decade as a result of global warming and ash covers caused by the recent volcanic activity of its eastern neighbour Tungurahua. At current rate Carihuairazo's Glacier is expected to completely disappear between 2020 and 2030.

=== Volcanism ===
Carihuairazo must have been a Volcano of similar dimensions to its neighbour Chimborazo before explosions during the last period of activity destroyed the mass of the peak, leaving today's caldera. There is no evidence of historic activity and Carihuayrazo is considered inactive.

== History ==
=== Etymology ===
An interpretation of its name is that it's a combination of the Quichua words Cari (man), huay (wind) and razu (Ice/Snow) (Schmudlach 2001). Local Indian mythology narrates that Carihuairazo and El Altar which are both volcanic calderas have been destroyed by Taita (Father) Chimborazo fighting for the grace of Mama Tungurahua.

=== First Ascent ===
Carihuairazo was climbed by Edward Whymper, the cousins Louis and Jean-Antoine Carrel, and Ecuadorians David Beltran and Francisco Campaña, during their 1880 Ecuador expedition. It is not entirely clear from Whymper's description, but some people believe that they climbed the Mocha (4,960m) and not the Maxim summit (5,018m). The first ascent of the Maxim summit is therefore attributed to Arturo Eichler, Horacio Lopez Uribe and Jean Morawiecki in 1951. Whymper and his companions ascended in cloudy conditions, believing the east peak (Mocha) to be the higher one. When the clouds cleared on their descent, Whymper said they could see they had climbed the west peak. It is likely that he meant the central summit, which is just west of Mocha.

== Climbing ==
Due to the glacier retreat and its consequences climbing Carihuairazo has shifted from a PD glacier route with some rock scrambling to an AD route with a technical climb to the summit tower (Maxima, 5,018m).

- Carihuairazo can be climbed year round with best seasons being December–January and July–August.
- A good height acclimatization is highly recommended for this climb.
- The mountain is contained on the IGM (Instituto Geografico Militar) 1:50000 Map Chimborazo (CT-ÑIV-C1) (IGM 1991).

=== Routes ===
The normal route to Carihuairazo Maxima (5,018m) starts from a camping spot at ~4,600m, reaching the main ridge either via the SW-ridge or from West via the glacier, followed by a difficult technical climb to reach the summit tower.

== See also ==
- Lists of volcanoes
  - List of volcanoes in Ecuador
