= El Altar =

Volcano in Ecuador

- Capak Urcu
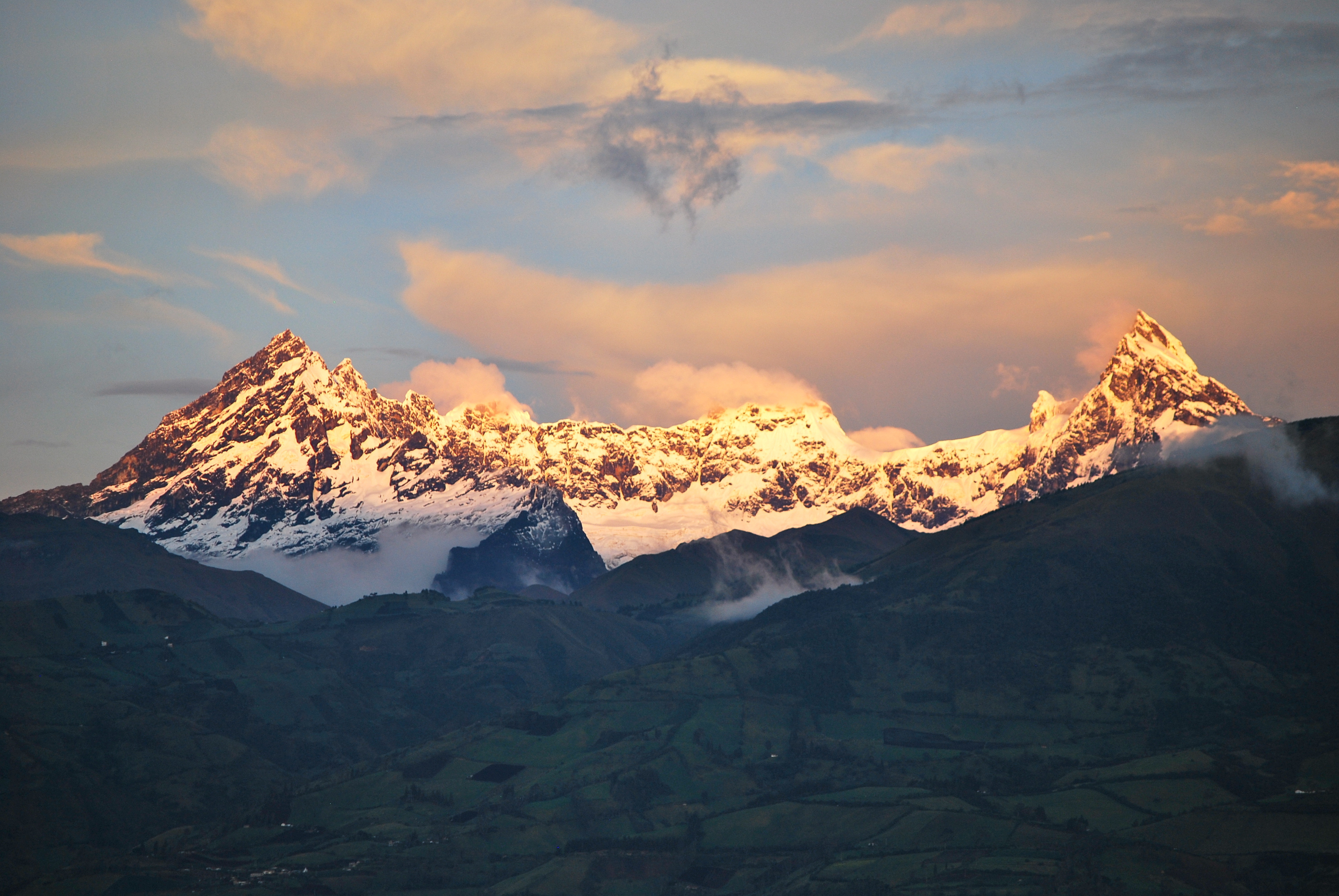
- El Altar in 2006

Highest point
- Elevation: 5,319 m (17,451 ft)
- Prominence: 2,072 m (6,798 ft)
- Listing: Ultra; List of volcanoes in Ecuador
- Coordinates: 01°39′48″S 78°24′33″W

Geography
- Location within Ecuador
- Location: Ecuador
- Parent range: Andes

Geology
- Rock age: Pliocene-Pleistocene
- Mountain type: Stratovolcano (extinct)
- Last eruption: Unknown

Climbing
- First ascent: 7 July 1963 by Marino Tremonti, Ferdinando Gaspard and Claudio Zardini
- Easiest route: rock/ice climb

El Altar or Capac Urcu (possibly from Kichwa kapak principal, great, important / magnificence, urku mountain) is an extinct volcano on the western side of Sangay National Park in Ecuador, 170 km (110 mi) south of Quito, with a highest point of 5,319 m (17,451 ft). Spaniards named it so because it resembled two nuns and four friars listening to a bishop around a church altar. In older English sources it is also called The Altar.

== Geology ==
El Altar consists of a large stratovolcano of Pliocene-Pleistocene age with a caldera breached to the west. Inca legends report that the top of El Altar collapsed after seven years of activity in about 1460, but the caldera is considered to be much older than this by geologists. Nine major peaks over 5,000 metres (16,400 ft) form a horseshoe-shaped ridge about 3 kilometres (1.9 mi) across, surrounding a central basin that contains a crater lake at about 4,200 m (13,800 ft), known as Laguna Collanes or Laguna Amarilla.

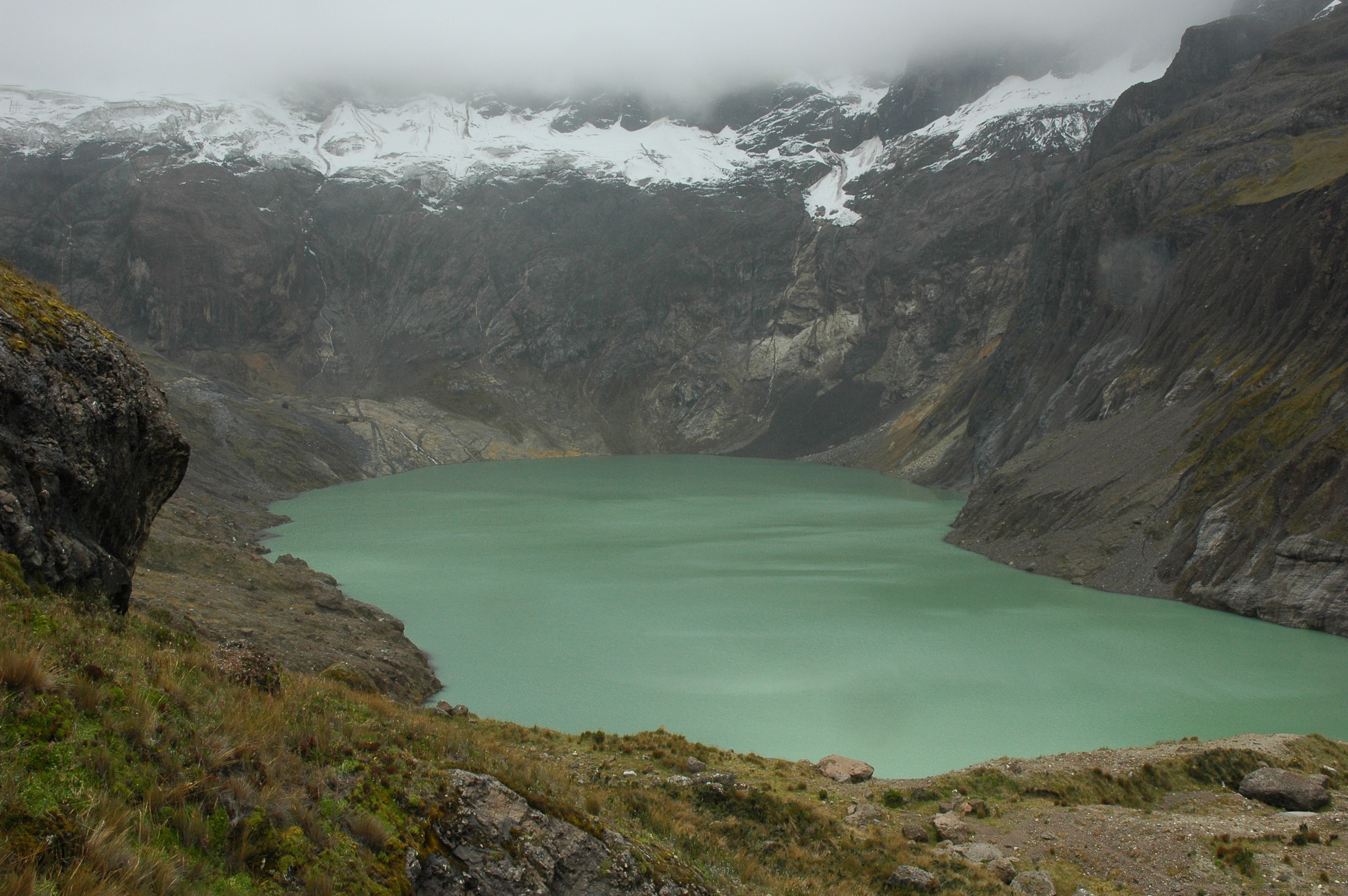
Laguna Collanes or Laguna Amarilla

== Access and recreation ==
El Altar is perhaps the most technically demanding climb in Ecuador. The route to the El Obispo summit is graded D+. December through February are the best months to attempt an ascent. Much more accessible is the hike to the lake within the caldera of the mountain. From Riobamba, one takes a bus for about an hour to Candelaria and then checks in at the ranger station to enter the Sangay park. About 4–7 hours of an extremely muddy trail (knee-high rubber boots are recommended) leaves one at the refuge belonging to Hacienda Releche, which can be rented. The refuge has many beds, and a kitchen. The hike to the lake is another 1.5h - 2 hours from the refuge across a valley and up a steep hill.

== List of peaks ==
The nine peaks of El Altar, starting with the highest summit on the south side and proceeding counterclockwise:

Peak name	Translation	Elevation	Direction from lake	First ascent
Obispo	Bishop	5,319 m (17,451 ft)	South	July 7, 1963, Ferdinando Gaspard, Marino Tremonti, Claudio Zardini
Monja Grande	Great Nun	5,160 m (16,929 ft)	Southeast	August 17, 1968, Bill Ross and Margaret Young
Monja Chica	Small Nun	5,080 m (16,667 ft)	East-Southeast	January 16, 1971, Peter Bednar and party
Tabernáculo	Tabernacle	5,180 m (16,995 ft)	East	
Fraile Oriental	Eastern Friar	5,060 m (16,601 ft)	East-Northeast	September 28, 1979, Fernando Jaramillo, Danny Moreno, Luis Naranjo, Hernán Reinoso, Mauricio Reinoso and Marcos Serrano
Fraile Beato	Devout Friar	5,050 m (16,568 ft)	East-Northeast	
Fraile Central	Central Friar	5,070 m (16,634 ft)	Northeast	
Fraile Grande	Great Friar	5,180 m (16,995 ft)	North-Northeast	December 1, 1972, Lorenzo Lorenzi, Armando Perron, Marino Tremonti
Canónigo	Canon	5,260 m (17,257 ft)	North	March 7, 1965, Ferdinando Gaspard, Lorenzo Lorenzi, Marino Tremonti, Claudio Zardini

== See also ==
- Geography of Ecuador
- List of mountains in Ecuador
- List of Ultras of South America
- Lists of volcanoes
  - List of volcanoes in Ecuador

== Sources ==
- Brain, Yossi (2000). Ecuador: A Climbing Guide. Mountaineers Books. p. 192 pp. ISBN 0-89886-729-0.
- Hall, Minard L. (1977). El Volcanismo en el Ecuador. Sección Nacional del Ecuador. p. 120 pp. (in Spanish)
- Biggar, John (2005). The Andes: A Guide for Climbers (3rd ed.). Andes Publishing (Scotland). p. 304 pp. ISBN 0-9536087-2-7.
- "Altar". Global Volcanism Program. Smithsonian Institution.
