= Corazón (volcano) =

Volcano in Ecuador

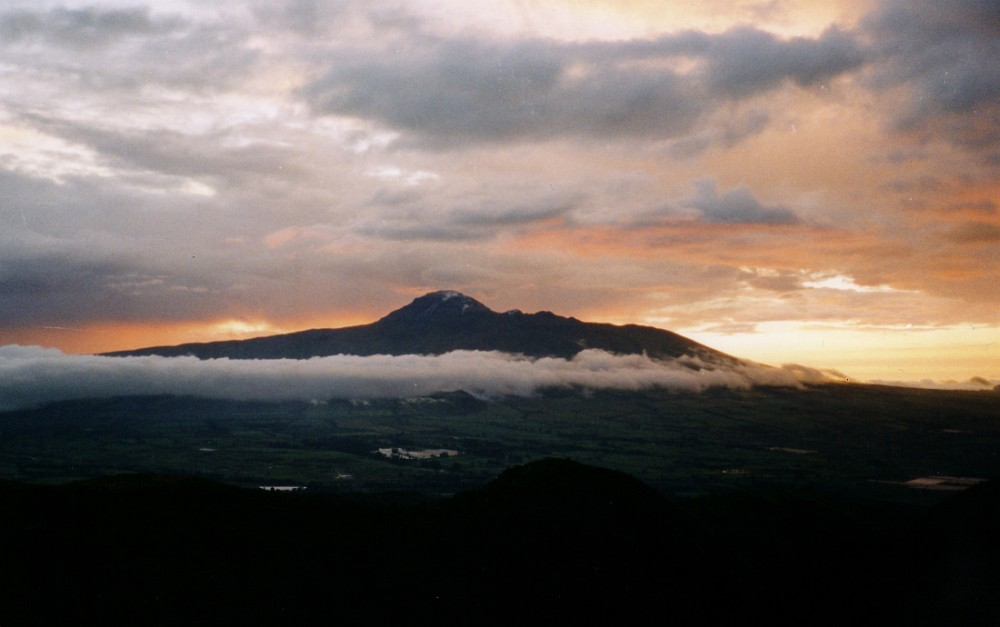
- Corazón as seen from Rumiñahui

Highest point
- Elevation: 4,790 m (15,720 ft)
- Prominence: 906 m (2,972 ft)
- Coordinates: 00°32′17″S 78°41′15″W

Geography
- Location within Ecuador
- Location: Ecuador
- Parent range: Andes

Geology
- Mountain type: Stratovolcano
- Last eruption: Pleistocene ages

Climbing
- First ascent: July 20, 1738 by Pierre Bouguer and Charles-Marie de La Condamine

Corazón (Spanish: "heart") is an inactive, eroded stratovolcano of Ecuador, situated about 30 km southwest of Quito in the western slopes of the Andes.

== See also ==
- Lists of volcanoes
  - List of volcanoes in Ecuador
