= Pasochoa =

Extinct volcano in Ecuador

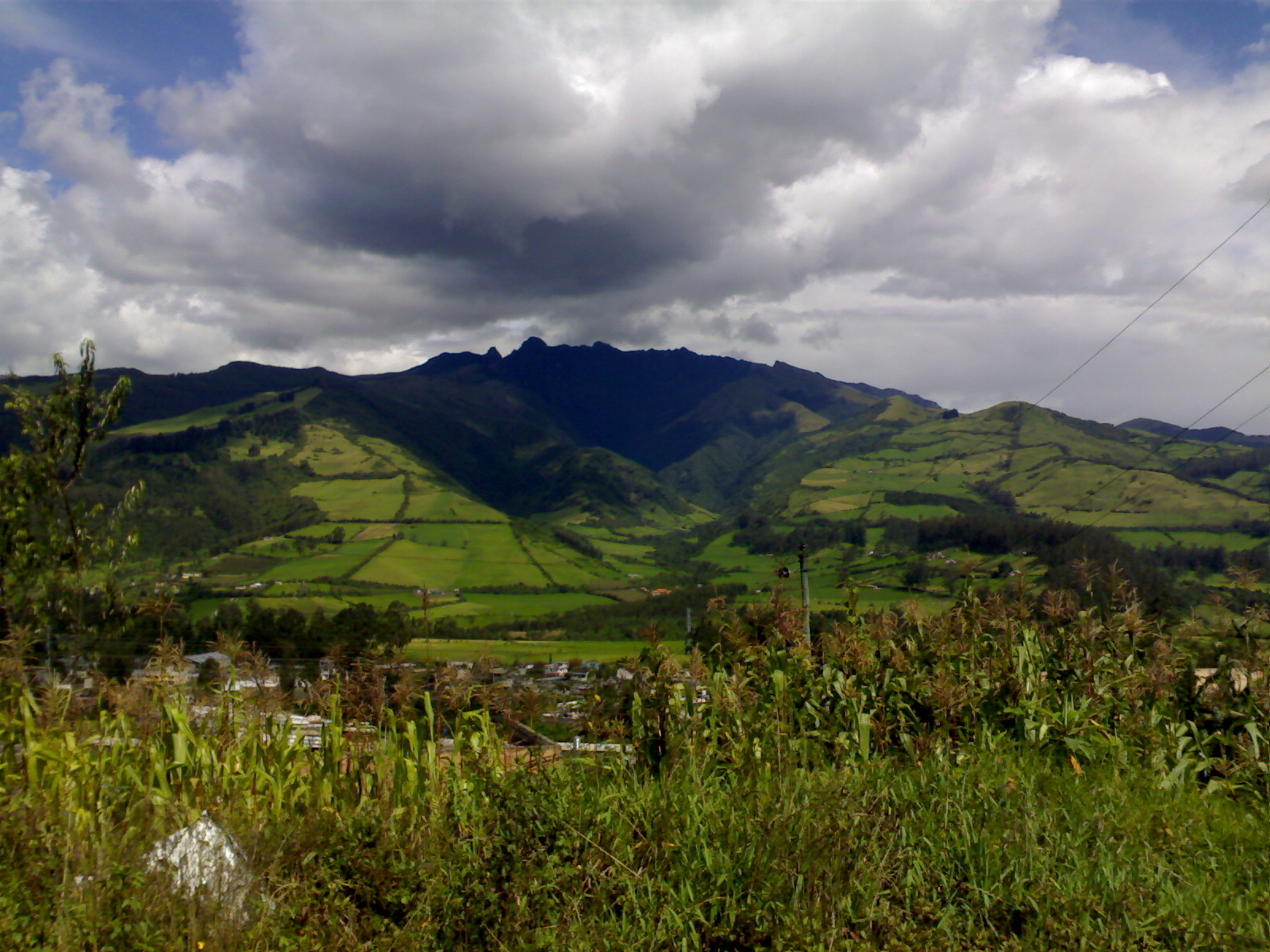
- Pasochoa as seen from Machachi

Highest point
- Elevation: 4,200 m (13,800 ft)
- Coordinates: 0°26′S 78°29′W

Geography
- Location within Ecuador
- Location: Ecuador
- Parent range: Andes

Pasochoa (4,200 metres) is an extinct volcano located in the Guayllabamba river basin in the Ecuadorian Andes. The current mountain form is a collapsed crater with a semicircular shape. This structure emerged approximately 100 thousand years ago due to an eruption which destroyed the crater and occidental slope of the previous volcanic cone.

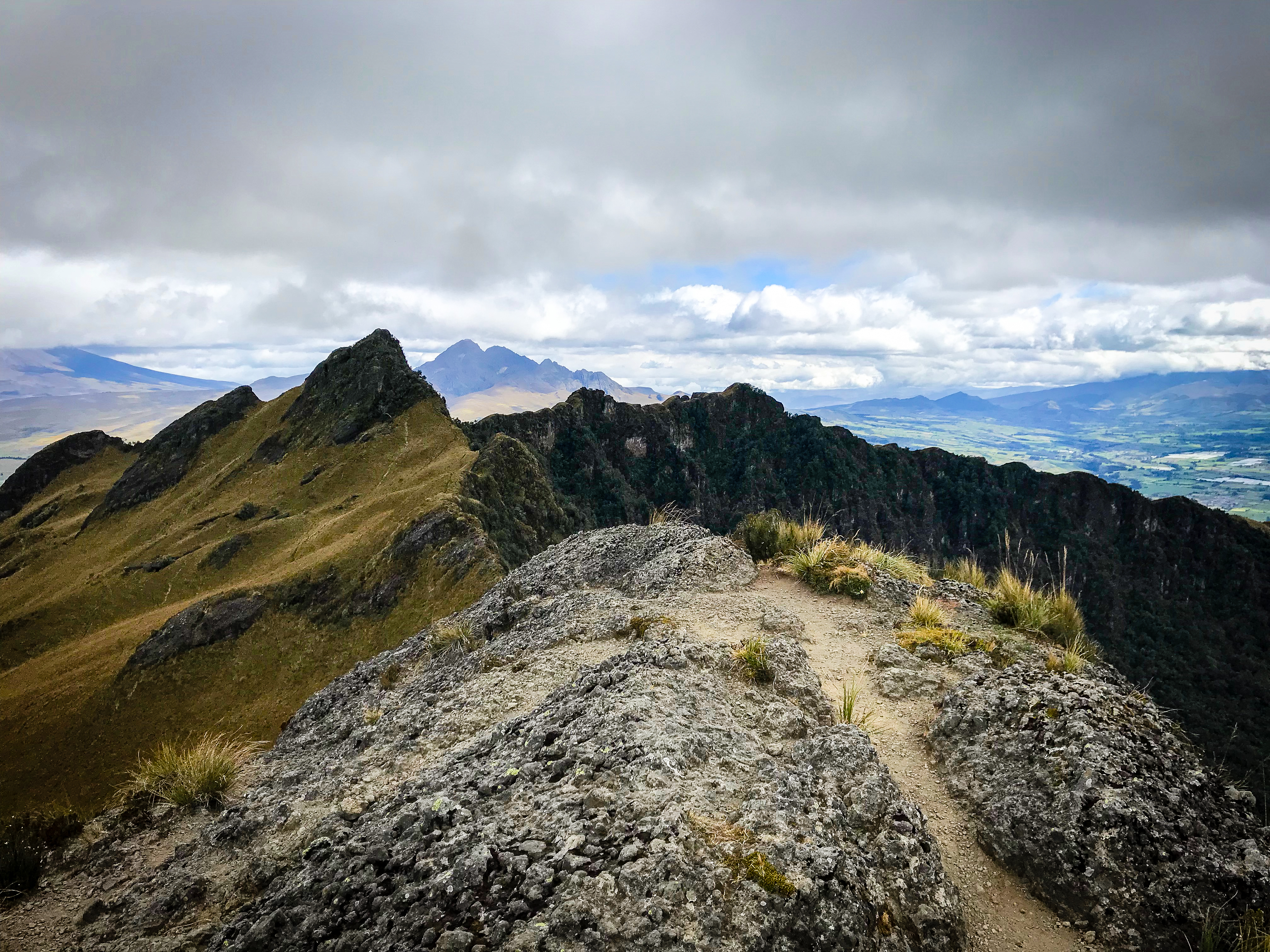
This is a shot from the Pasochoa's summit in 2018

Lava and ash increased the fertility of the ground in the Pasochoa region, encouraging the growth of a vibrant forest ecosystem. Despite the fertile soil, difficult accessibility and an uneven surface made the area inappropriate for extensive agriculture. The Pasochoa Wildlife Refuge, established in 1996, contains one of the few remaining original Andean forests. Fundacion Natura used to manage the Pasochoa and offer programs on the natural resource conservation and environmental education and sponsors scientific research. Recently, the mountain's management has passed to the hands of the Ministerio del Ambiente. The mountain has a variety of wildlife, including pumas, foxes, skunks, over 100 species of birds, and over 200 species of plants.

Today the volcano is well known as a travel destination.

== See also ==
- List of volcanoes in Ecuador
