= Atacazo =

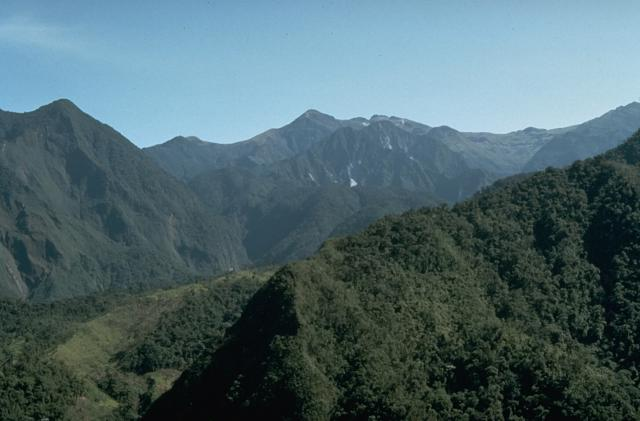
- Atacazo viewed from the other side

Highest point
- Elevation: 4,463 m (14,642 ft)
- Prominence: 1,180 m (3,870 ft)
- Coordinates: 0°21′10″S 78°37′01″W

Geography
- Location within Ecuador
- Location: Ecuador
- Parent range: Andes

Geology
- Mountain type: Stratovolcano
- Last eruption: 320 BCE ± 16 years

Atacazo is a volcano of the Western Cordillera located 25 kilometers southwest of Quito, Ecuador. Atacazo is a stratovolcano formed by the action of a Late-Pleistocene to Holocene caldera. The last eruption of the Atacazo was nearly 2300 years ago.

== Aerial tragedy ==
On November 7, 1960 a Fairchild F-27 turboprop passenger plane, operated by the now-defunct national airline AREA Ecuador, struck the Atacazo in bad weather during its approach to the newly-inaugurated Mariscal Sucre International Airport after a flight from Simón Bolívar International Airport, in Guayaquil. The crash, 16 kilometres (9.9 mi) south of Quito and 150 meters to the summit of the Atacazo, killed all the 37 occupants of the plane. At the time, it was the worst aerial crash in the history of Ecuador, the first and worst fatal loss of an F-27 passenger plane, and the first accident involving the then-recently-opened Quito airport.

== See also ==
- Lists of volcanoes
  - List of volcanoes in Ecuador
