= Sincholagua Volcano =

Inactive volcano in Ecuador

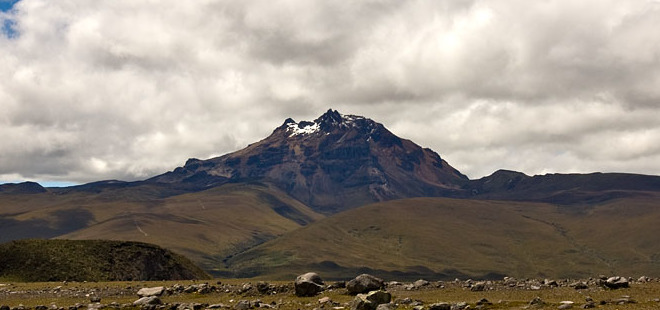
- Sincholagua Volcano

Highest point
- Elevation: 4,899 m (16,073 ft)
- Coordinates: 0°32′17″S 78°22′19″W

Geography
- Location within Ecuador
- Location: Ecuador
- Parent range: Andes

Geology
- Mountain type(s): Stratovolcano, Historical
- Last eruption: 1877

Climbing
- First ascent: 23 February 1880 by Edward Whymper, Jean-Antoine Carrel and Louis Carrel
- Easiest route: Scramble

Sincholagua is an inactive volcano located in Ecuador 17 km (11 mi) northeast of Cotopaxi Volcano and 45 km (28 mi) southeast of Quito. It is the 12th highest peak in the country at 4,899 m (16,073 ft) but also one of the lesser known ones. The name of the mountain comes from the indigenous language Quichua and means "strong above". Due to its close proximity to Cotopaxi, the second highest peak in Ecuador and the most popular volcano, it is far less frequently visited compared to other mountains in the country. It has a sharp peak and at one point had glacial cover year round, but all of the glaciers melted a few decades ago. However, snow can still be seen on the peak since there is sometimes heavy snowfall at the summit.

== Climbing Sincholagua ==
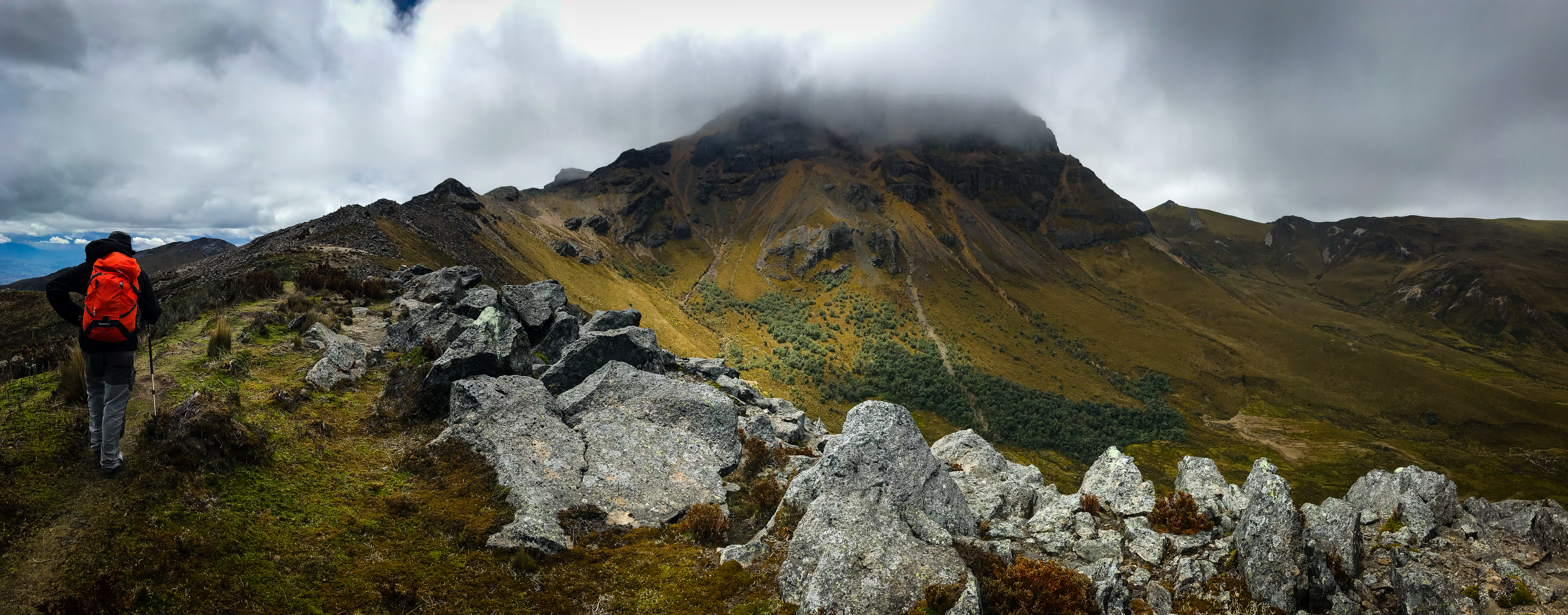
Path leading to the summit of the Sincholagua Volcano (2018)

Sincholagua is one of the least frequently climbed mountains in Ecuador because it is difficult to access and less well known compared to other mountains and volcanoes in the country. There is also a long hike to access it compared to other volcanoes like Pichincha and Cotopaxi, making it more difficult to get to. Sincholagua is best known for views of the surrounding mountains such as Cotopaxi and Antisana as well as the Western Cordillera and the Amazon rainforest. The climb is of moderate difficulty and takes an estimated three hours and thirty minutes to reach the summit from base camp with ideal weather conditions. The Northwest ridge is the normal route up the mountain and was used by the first climbers. People who want to climb it usually come in from the south through Cotopaxi National Park to reach the volcano. It can also be accessed from Quito.

== History ==
The first ascent of Sincholagua was made by Edward Whymper, Jean-Antoine Carrel and Louis Carrel on 23 February 1880. Whymper is best known for being the first to ascend Matterhorn mountain in Switzerland. Sincholagua lost all permanent glaciers on its peak decades ago, but before that had a glacier cover about 1.5 kilometers long. A river that runs around and on the mountain, the Río Pita, widened due to the last major eruption in 1877. When Whymper climbed Sincholagua, the Río Pita was 200 feet wide and 3 feet deep, and in 1892, after the eruption it was 1,100 feet wide and 50 feet deep at its widest and deepest. Currently it is considered a stream.

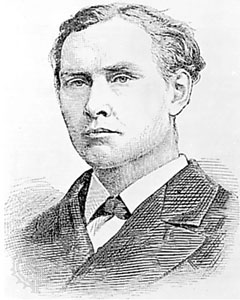
Edward Whymper, an English illustrator, was the first person to ascend Sincholagua.

=== Air crash ===
On 3 May 1995 a private Gulfstream II aircraft operated by American Jet, inbound from Buenos Aires via La Paz, selected the wrong VOR frequency during a nighttime approach to Quito's Mariscal Sucre Airport; the jet flew 12 miles (19 km) further south than it should have, striking Sincholagua at 16,000 feet (4,900 m). All seven occupants were killed. The flight was carrying a number of oil executives from Argentina and Chile to a meeting in Quito.

Among those killed was Argentine YPF's CEO and president José Estenssoro, who had led privatization efforts under Carlos Menem; Juan Pedrals Gili, the Spanish-born general manager of Chilean ENAP as well as Manfred Hecht Mittersteiner, chief of production at ENAP's international subsidiary Sipetrol.

Accompanying Estensoro was the controversial economist Ricardo Zinn, who worked as viceminister of economy and finances in the government of Isabel Perón in 1975, and was the author of the radical adjustment program known as the Rodrigazo. This phenomenon contributed to erode the political and social stability of Argentina in the lead-up to the 1976 coup d'état that installed the military dictatorship known as the National Reorganization Process, to which Zinn also contributed.
