= Rumiñahui (volcano) =

Volcano in Ecuador

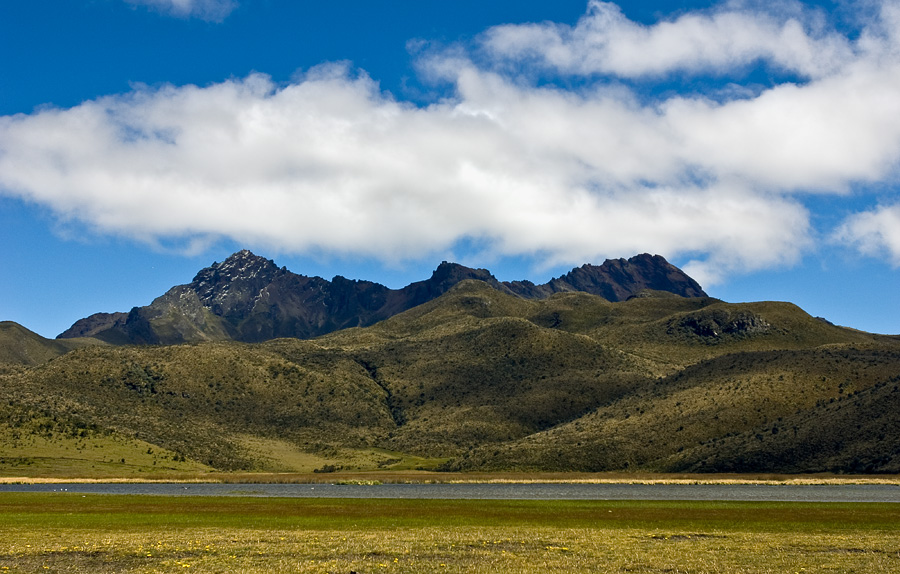
- Rumiñawi as seen from the lake Limpiopunku

Highest point
- Elevation: 4,721 m (15,489 ft)
- Coordinates: 00°38′S 78°32′W

Naming
- English translation: stone eye
- Language of name: Quechua

Geography
- Location within Ecuador
- Location: Ecuador
- Parent range: Andes

Geology
- Mountain type: Stratovolcano

Rumiñahui (/ruːmiˈnjɑːwiː/ roo-mee-NYAH-wee, Kichwa rumi stone, rock, ñawi eye, face, "stone eye", "stone face", "rock eye" or "rock face", Hispanicized spelling Rumiñahui, Spanish pronunciation: [rumiˈɲawi]) is a dormant, heavily eroded stratovolcano 4,721 metres (15,489 ft) above sea level. Situated in the Andes mountains 40 km south of Quito, Ecuador, it is overshadowed by its famous neighbour Cotopaxi.

== See also ==
- Rumiñahui
- Lists of volcanoes
  - List of volcanoes in Ecuador
  - List of stratovolcanoes

Latagunga
