= Chunchi =

Chunchi may refer to:

- Chunchi Canton, Chimborazo Province, Ecuador
  - Chunchi, Ecuador, town in and seat of Chunchi Canton
- Chunchi, Zhouning County (纯池镇), town in Zhouning County, Fujian, China
