= Guano (disambiguation) =

Guano is the accumulated excrement of seabirds or bats, often mined as a source of phosphorus.

Guano may also refer to:

== Plants ==
- Guano or Guano palm, any one of several species of palm trees in the genera Coccothrinax, Copernicia and Sabal, or the leaves of such palms used as thatch

== Comics ==
- Guano (Kappa Mikey), a fictional Pikachu-like character in the animated series Kappa Mikey

== Film, TV and stage ==
- Colonel 'Bat' Guano, a fictional character in the film Dr. Strangelove or: How I Learned to Stop Worrying and Love the Bomb (1964)

== Places ==
- Guano Canton, a subdivision of Chimborazo Province, Ecuador
- Guano, Ecuador, a town which is the administrative center of Guano Canton, in Chimborazo Province, Ecuador

== See also ==
- Guana (disambiguation)
- Iguana
- Goanna
