= Chambo River =

River of Ecuador

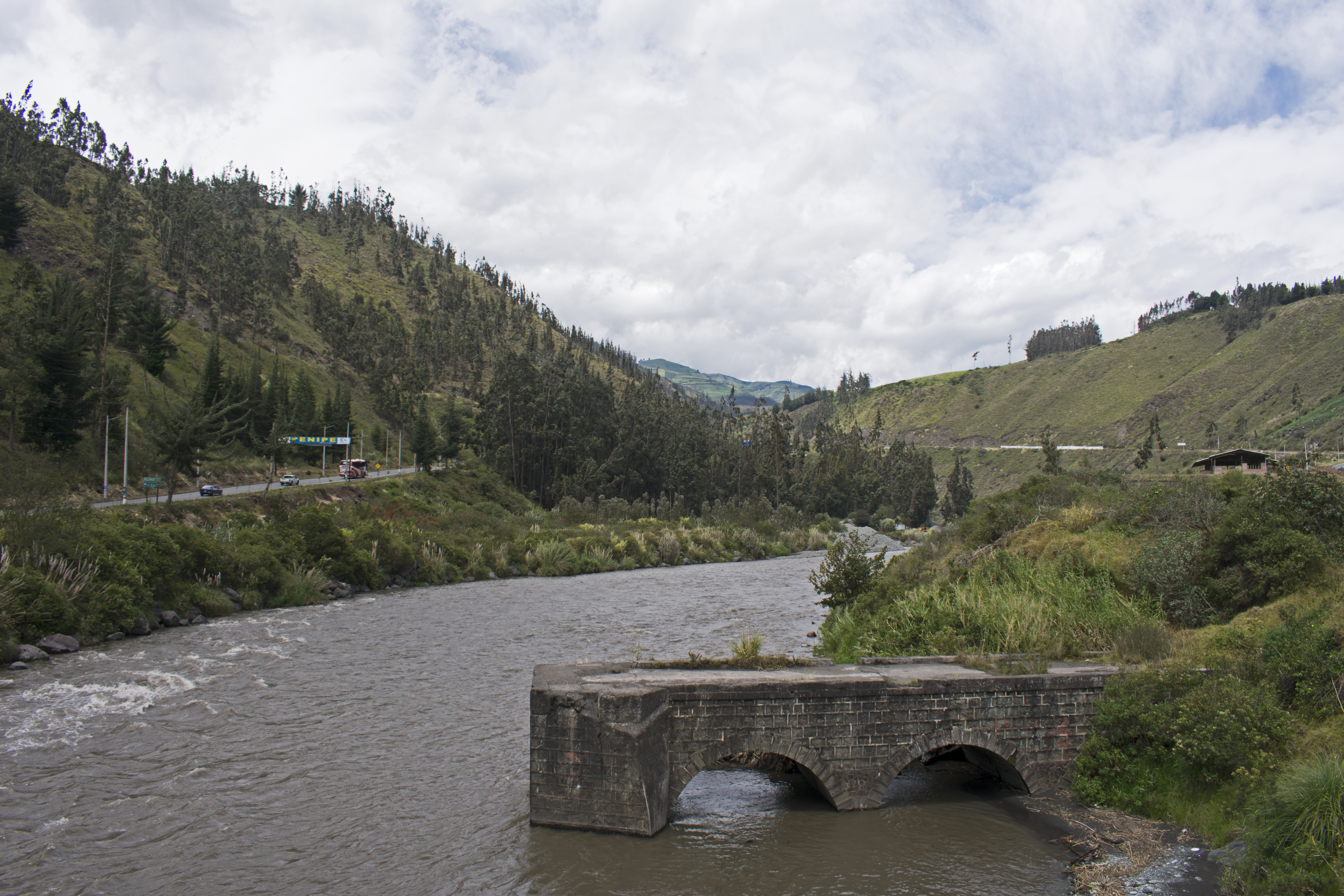
Old bridge over the Chambo in Penipe

The Chambo River (Spanish: Río Chambo) is a tributary of the Pastaza River in the Amazon basin in Ecuador. The Chambo rises on the Central Cordillera. The Chambo runs across Chimborazo Province, and eventually joins with the Patate River in Tungurahua Province, near Tungurahua, just upstream from the town of Baños de Agua Santa north of the volcano Mount Tungurahua. Chambo, a town along its path, was named after the river.
