= Sangolquí =

- City
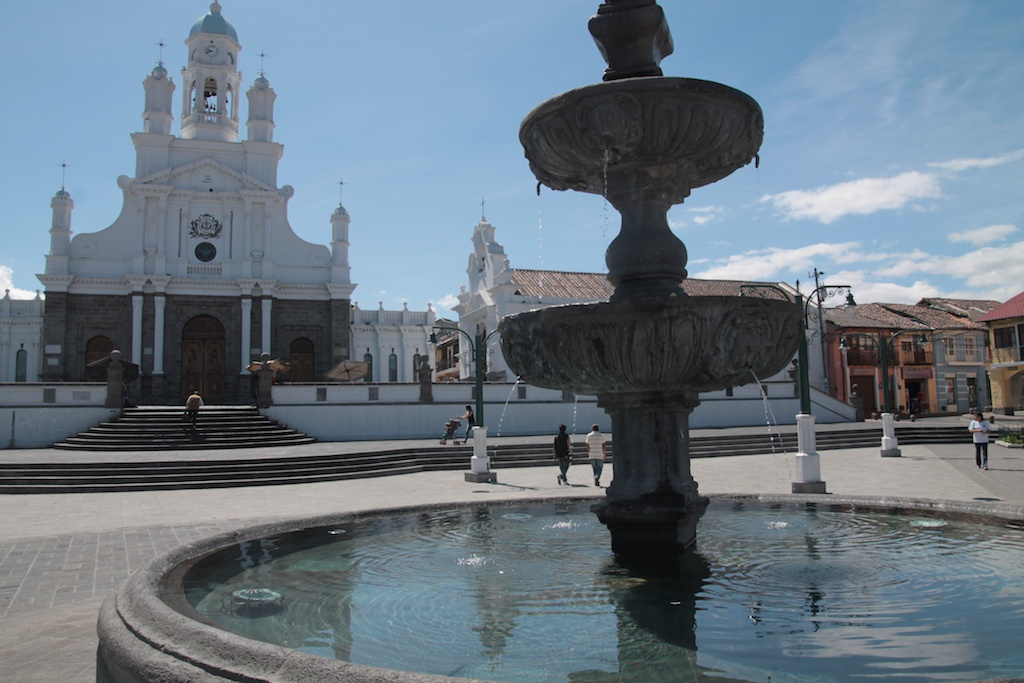

- Flag

- Location within Ecuador
- Coordinates: 0°19′59″S 78°26′39″W
- Country: Ecuador
- Province: Pichincha
- Canton: Rumiñahui Canton

Area
  - Total: 27.17 km^{2} (10.49 sq mi)

Population (2022 census)
  - Total: 96,647
  - Density: 3,557/km^{2} (9,213/sq mi)
- Website: http://www.ruminahui.gob.ec/rumi3/

Sangolquí is a suburb of Quito and the seat of Rumiñahui canton in the province of Pichincha, in northern Ecuador. It is connected to Quito by the Autopista General Rumiñahui (General Rumiñahui Highway).

The Armed Forces University – ESPE is located in the suburb. Other educational institutions here include Colegio Liceo del Valle, Colegio Antares, Liceo Naval Quito and Émile Jaques-Dalcroze High School.

The suburb is also home to the Headquarters of the Professional Football Club Independiente del Valle that reached the final of the 2016 Copa Libertadores, won the 2019 and the 2022 Copa Sudamericana.

Sangolquí, along with the rest of Rumiñahui canton, was designated as a Pueblo Mágico by the Ecuadorian Ministry of Tourism (MINTUR) in 2020.

== Climate ==
Climate data for Conocoto, elevation 2,550 m (8,370 ft), (1961–1990)
Month	Jan	Feb	Mar	Apr	May	Jun	Jul	Aug	Sep	Oct	Nov	Dec	Year
Mean daily maximum °C (°F)	22.5 (72.5)	22.6 (72.7)	22.2 (72.0)	22.1 (71.8)	22.7 (72.9)	22.2 (72.0)	22.7 (72.9)	22.7 (72.9)	23.6 (74.5)	22.7 (72.9)	22.2 (72.0)	22.7 (72.9)	22.6 (72.7)
Daily mean °C (°F)	15.6 (60.1)	15.1 (59.2)	15.3 (59.5)	15.3 (59.5)	15.5 (59.9)	15.1 (59.2)	15.3 (59.5)	15.5 (59.9)	15.5 (59.9)	15.3 (59.5)	15.3 (59.5)	15.6 (60.1)	15.4 (59.7)
Mean daily minimum °C (°F)	8.0 (46.4)	7.8 (46.0)	8.0 (46.4)	8.3 (46.9)	8.1 (46.6)	6.9 (44.4)	6.8 (44.2)	6.4 (43.5)	7.3 (45.1)	8.0 (46.4)	8.1 (46.6)	7.5 (45.5)	7.6 (45.7)
Average precipitation mm (inches)	72.0 (2.83)	173.0 (6.81)	174.0 (6.85)	210.0 (8.27)	138.0 (5.43)	57.0 (2.24)	20.0 (0.79)	50.0 (1.97)	139.0 (5.47)	183.0 (7.20)	148.0 (5.83)	128.0 (5.04)	1,492 (58.73)
Source: FAO
