= Pueblos Mágicos (Ecuador) =

The Programa Pueblos Mágicos (Spanish: [pweβloˈmaxiko]; "Magical Towns Programme") is an initiative led by Ecuador's Ministry of Tourism (MINTUR). The program seeks to promote tourism in a network of small and mid-sized towns that represent aspects of Ecuador's cultural heritage, and to encourage sustainable economic development in these communities. It is based on the Mexican government's program of the same name.

The network was first established in 2019, with an inaugural class of 5 municipalities. As of 16 March 2021, there were 21 designated Pueblos Mágicos, distributed among 14 of Ecuador's 24 provinces.

== List of Current Pueblos Mágicos in Ecuador ==
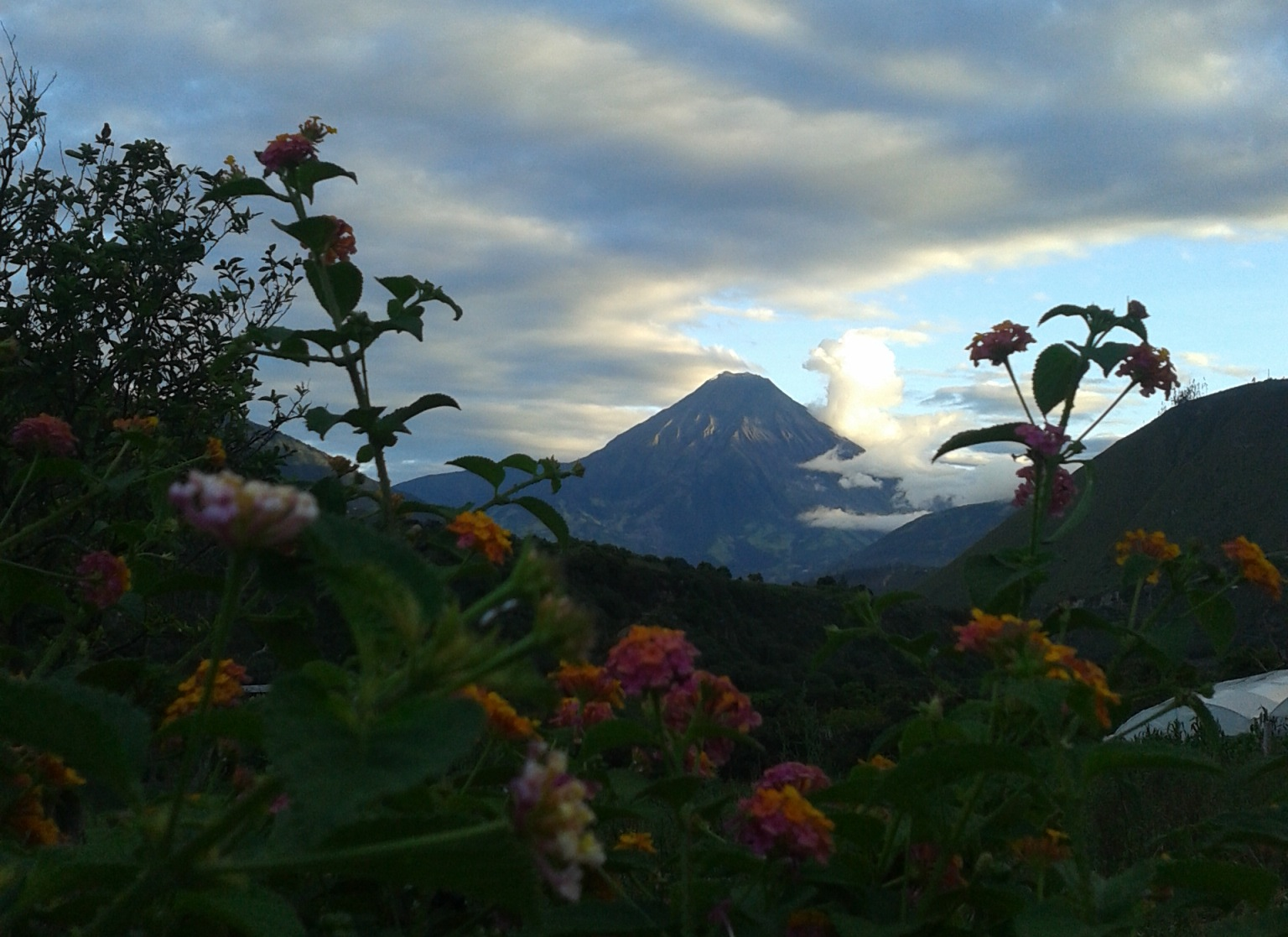
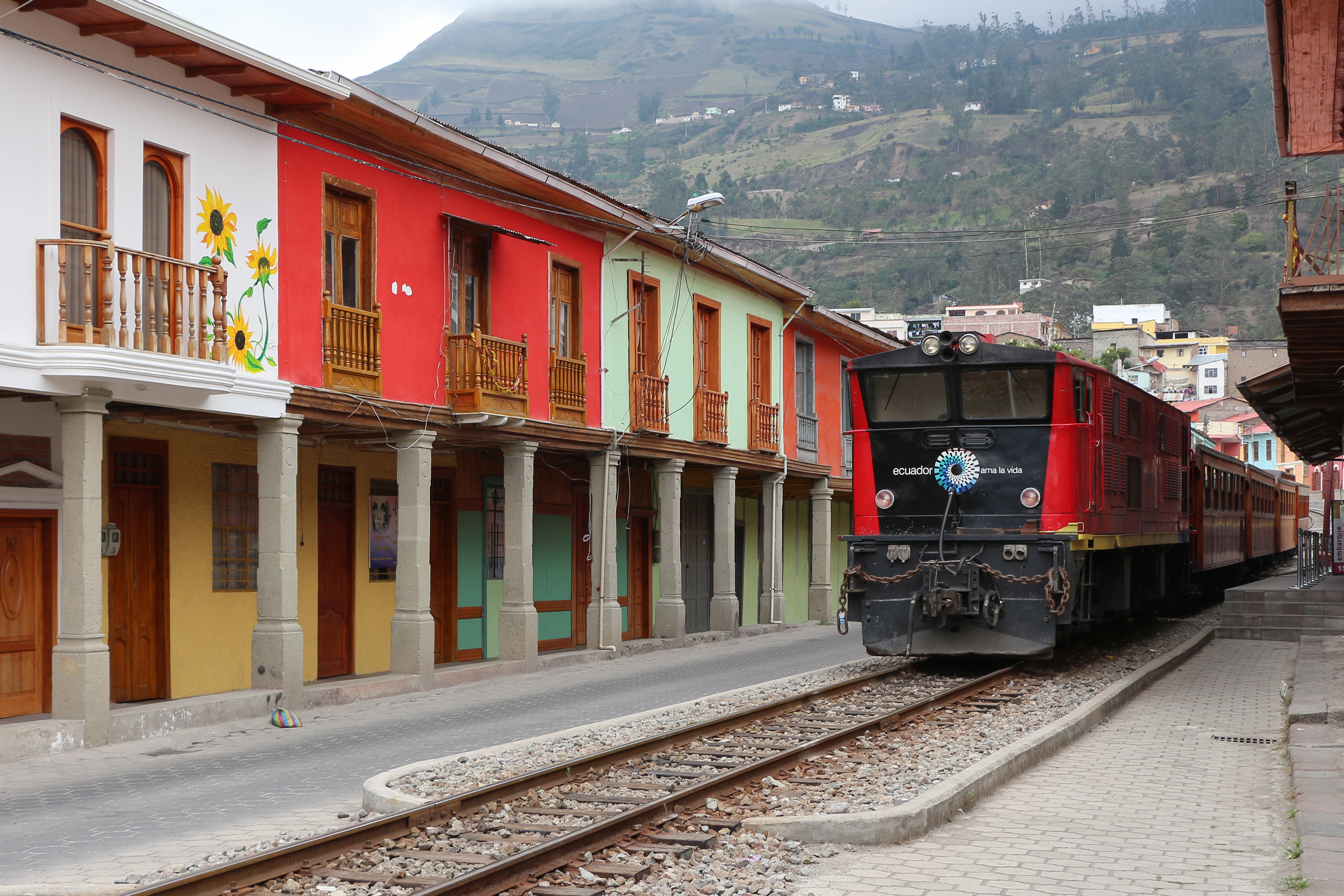
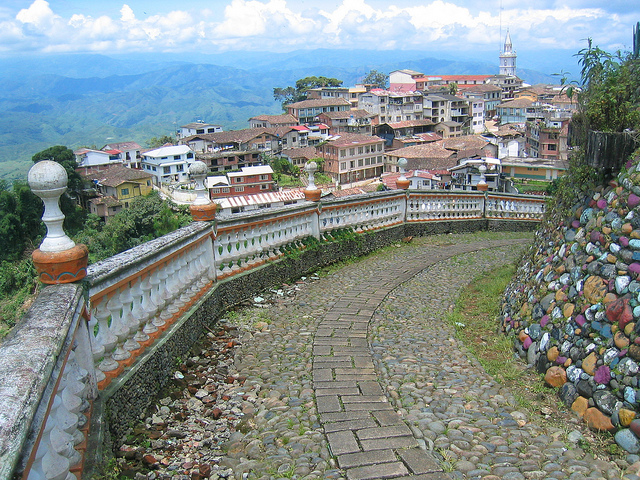
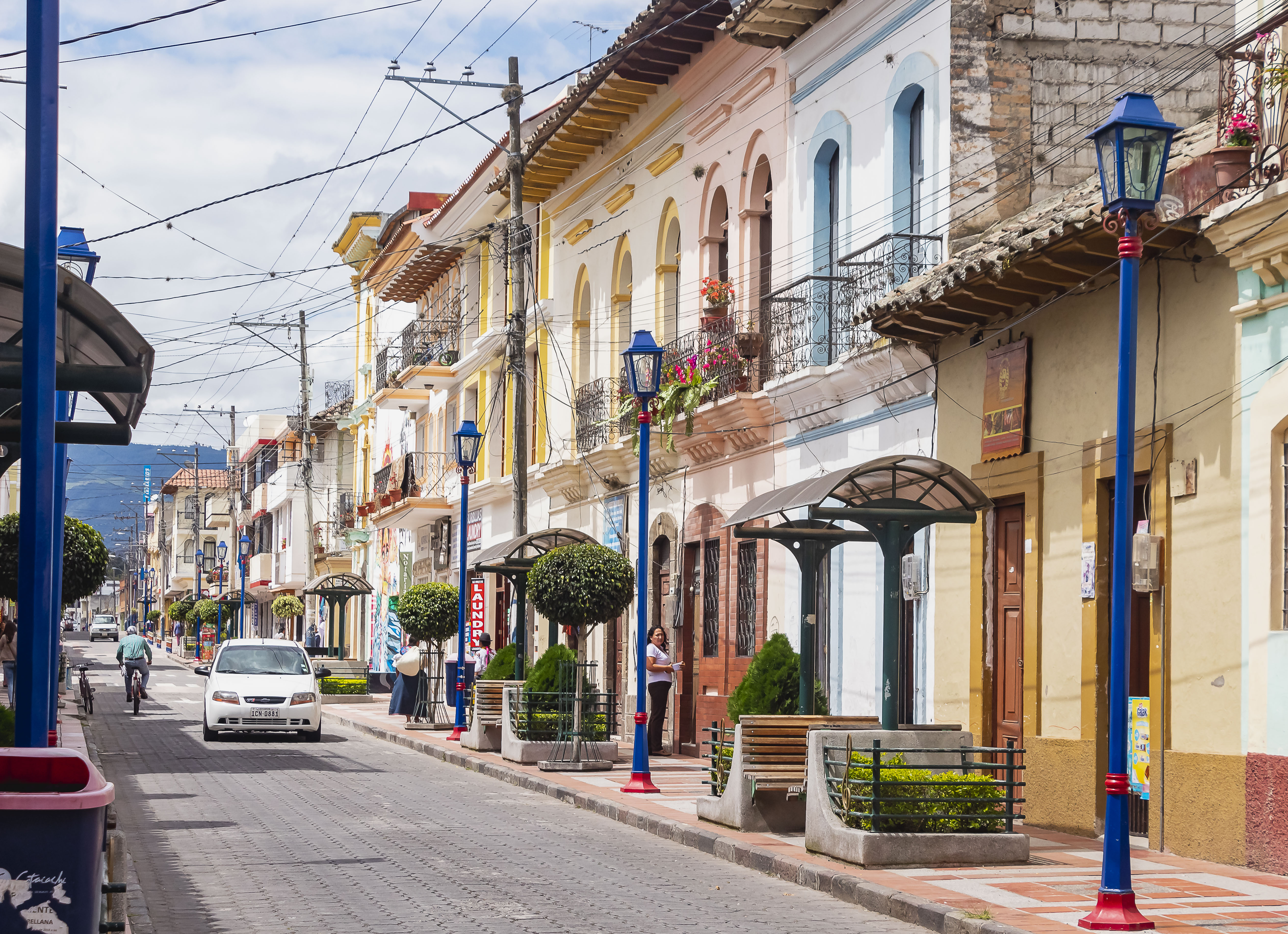
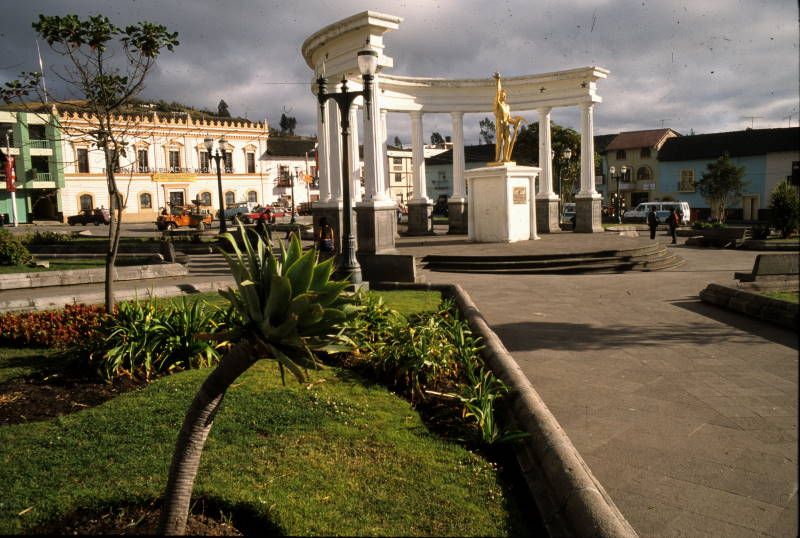
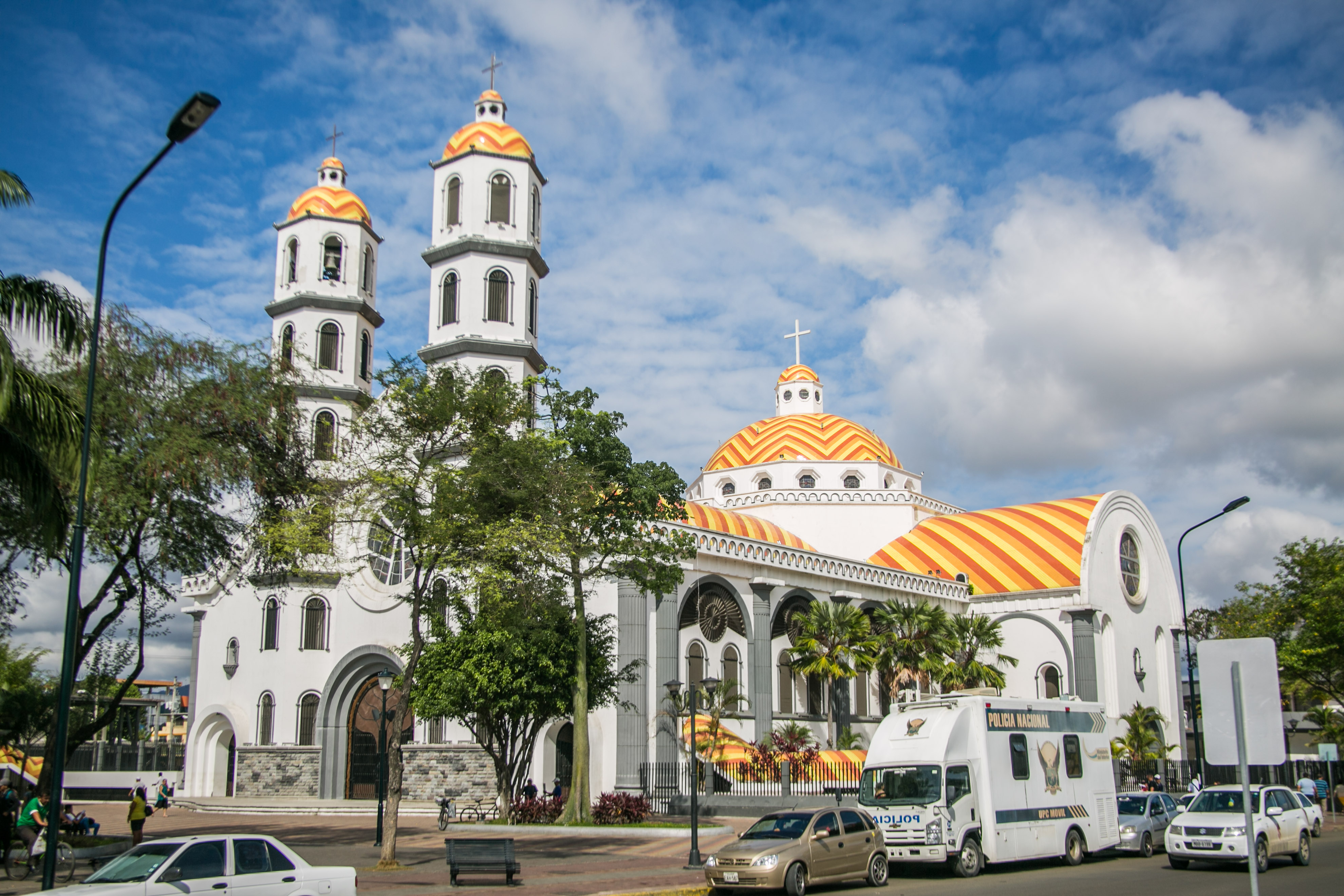
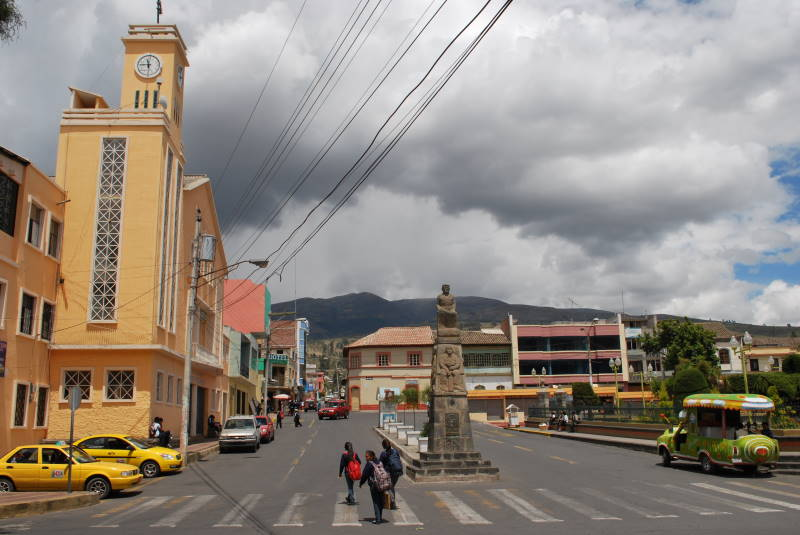
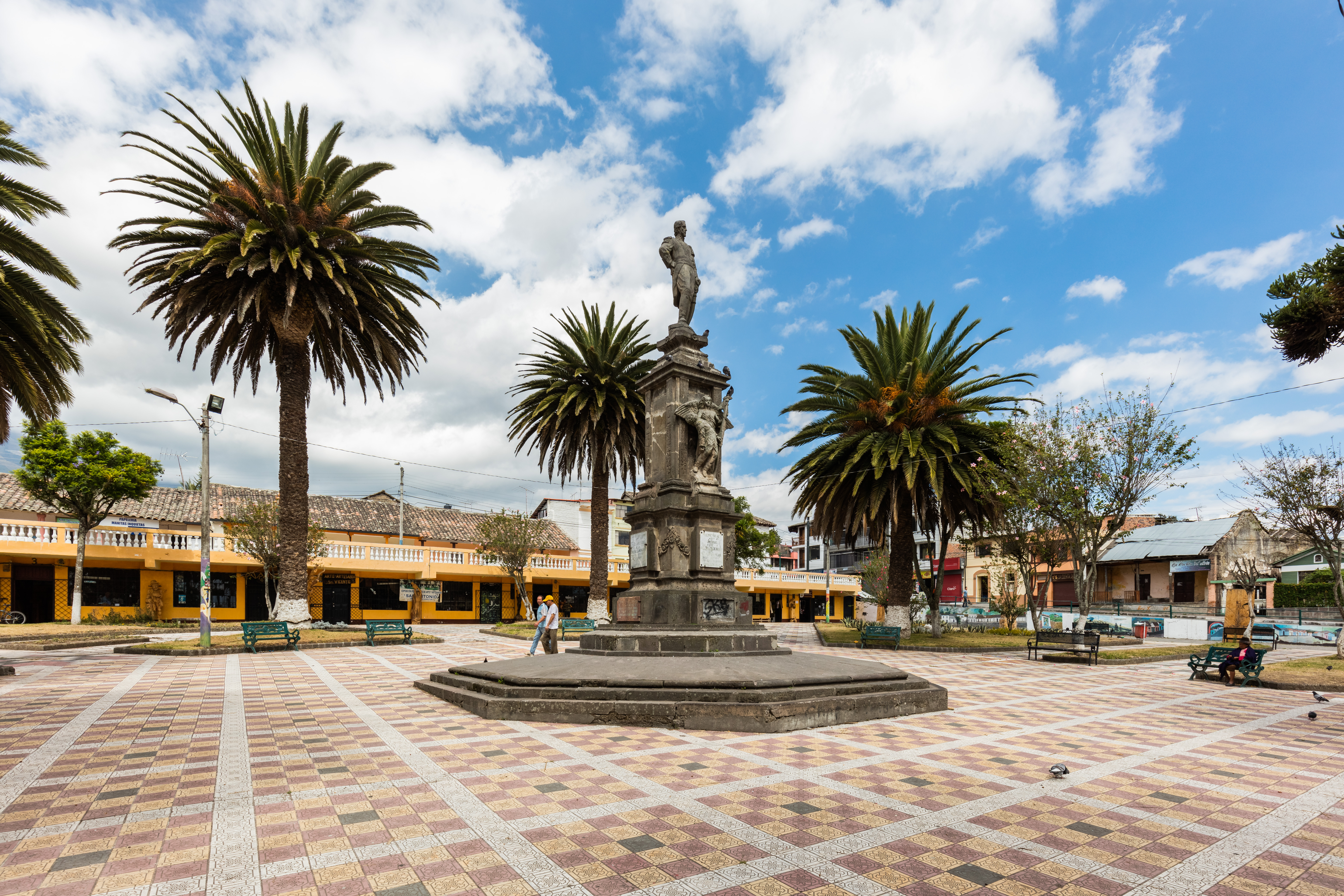
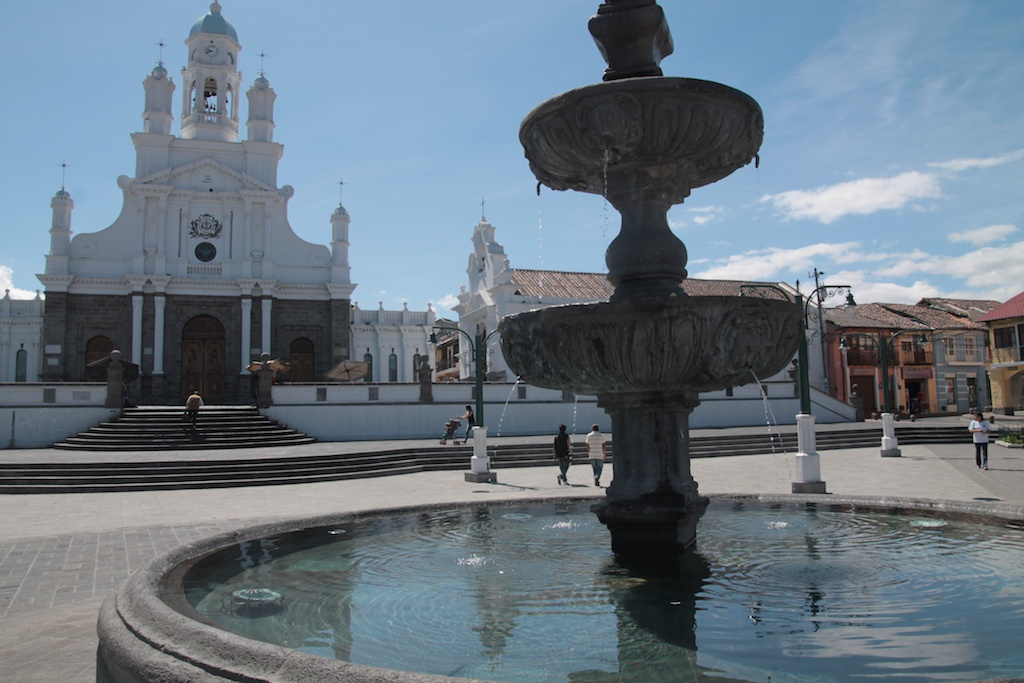
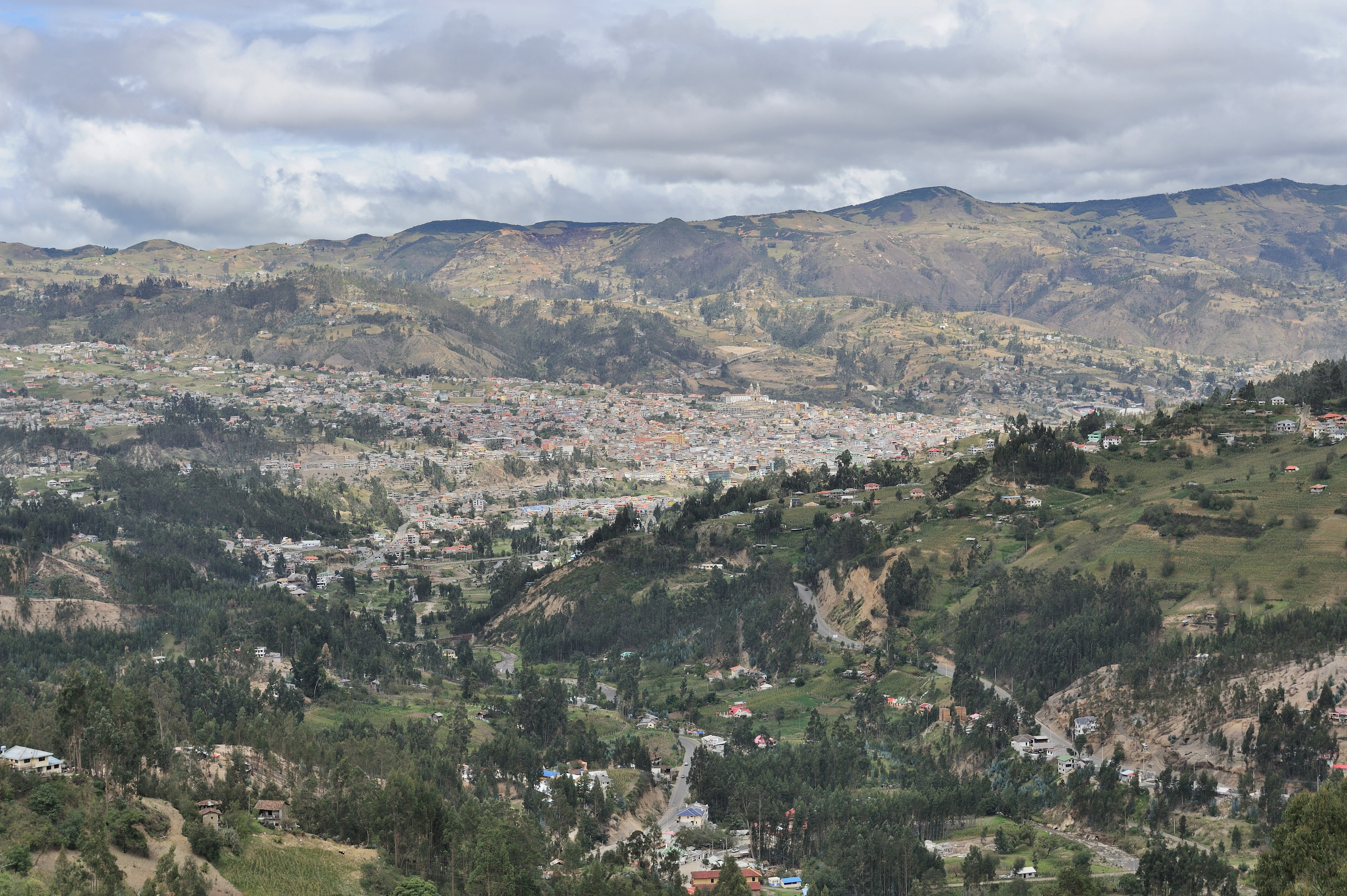
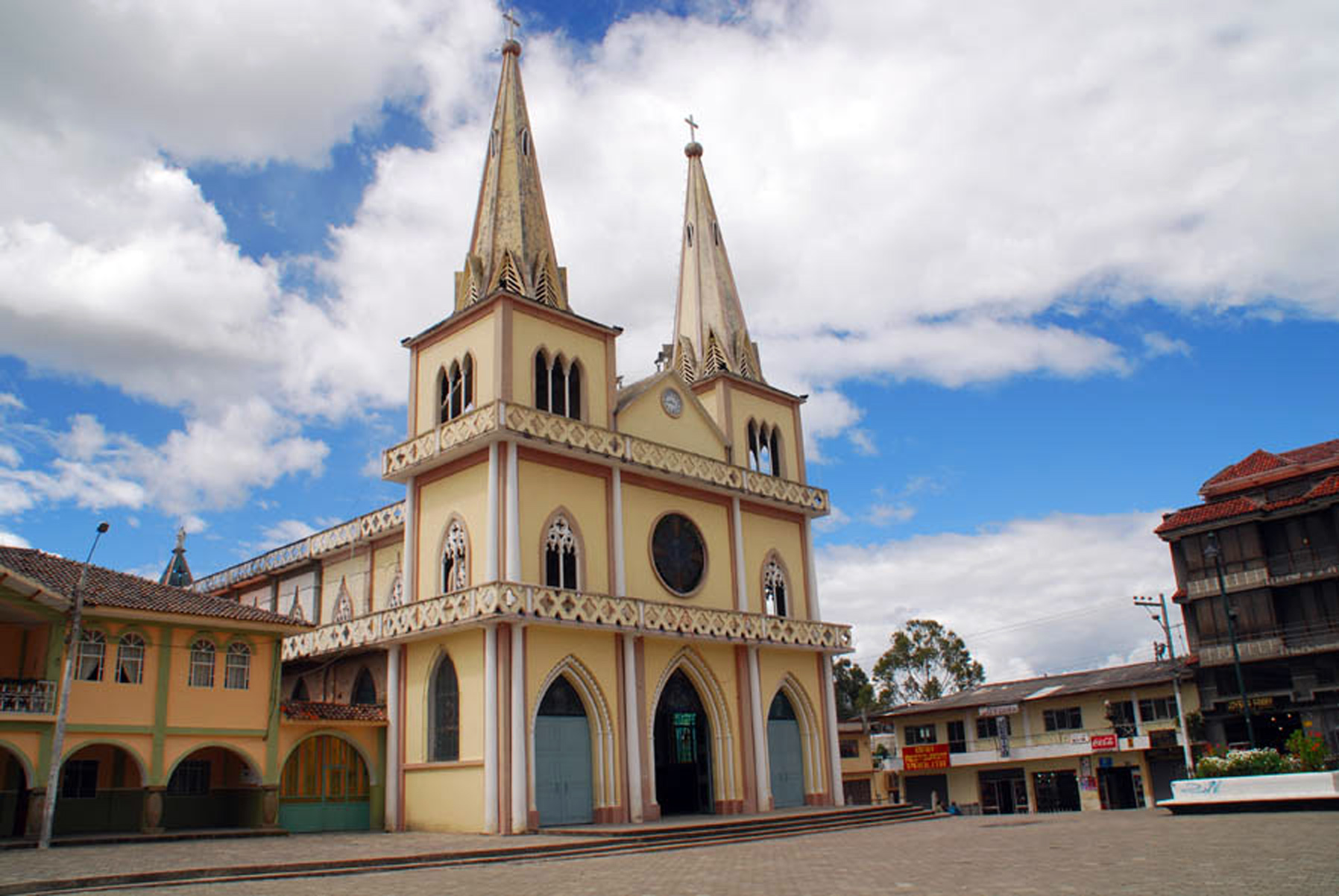
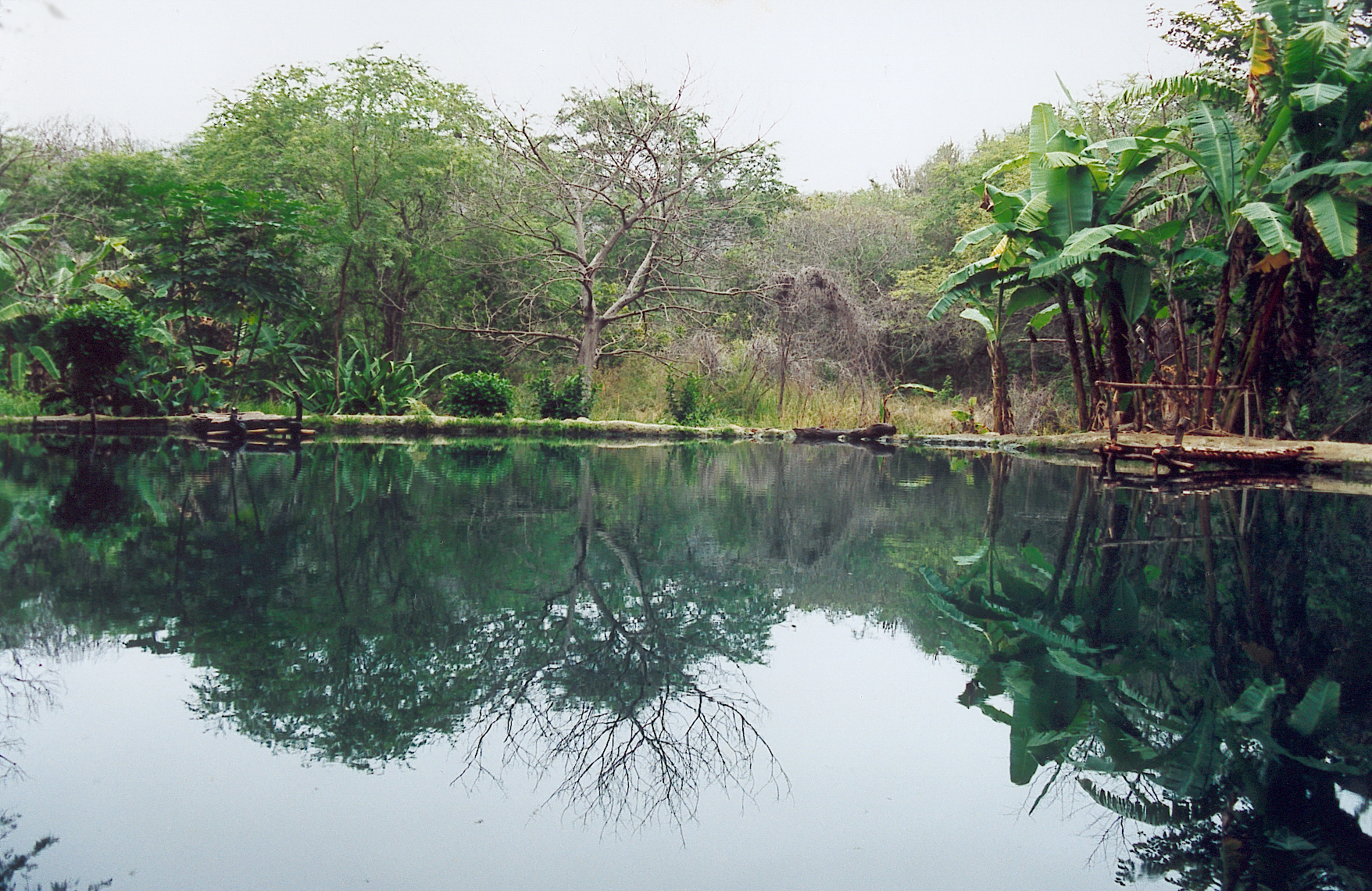
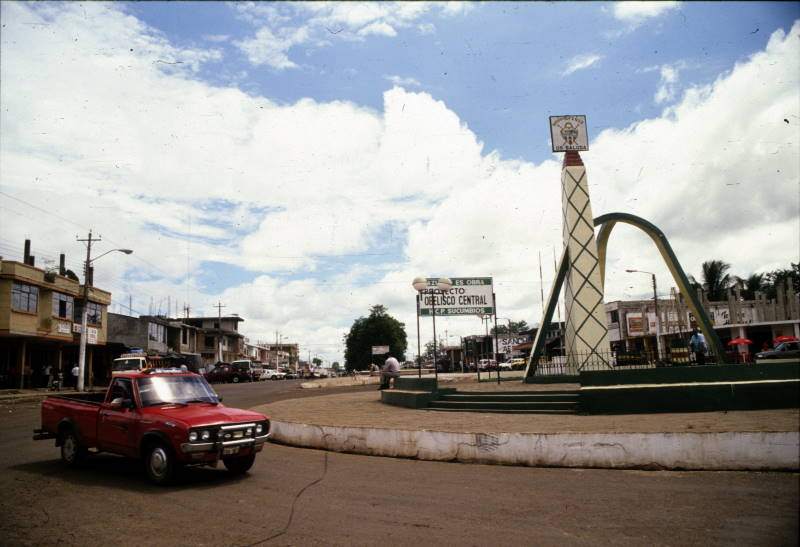
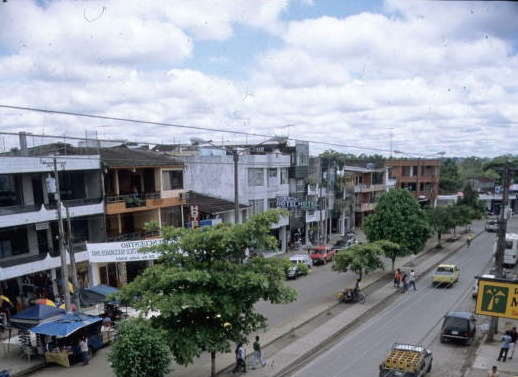
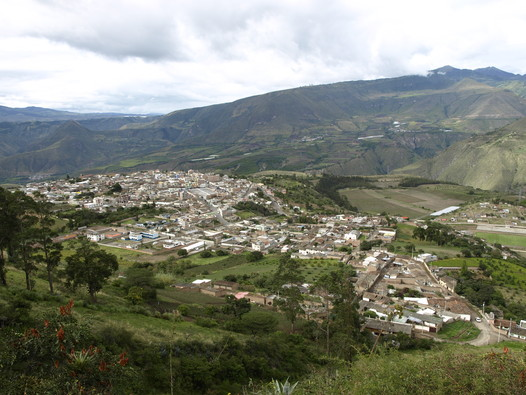
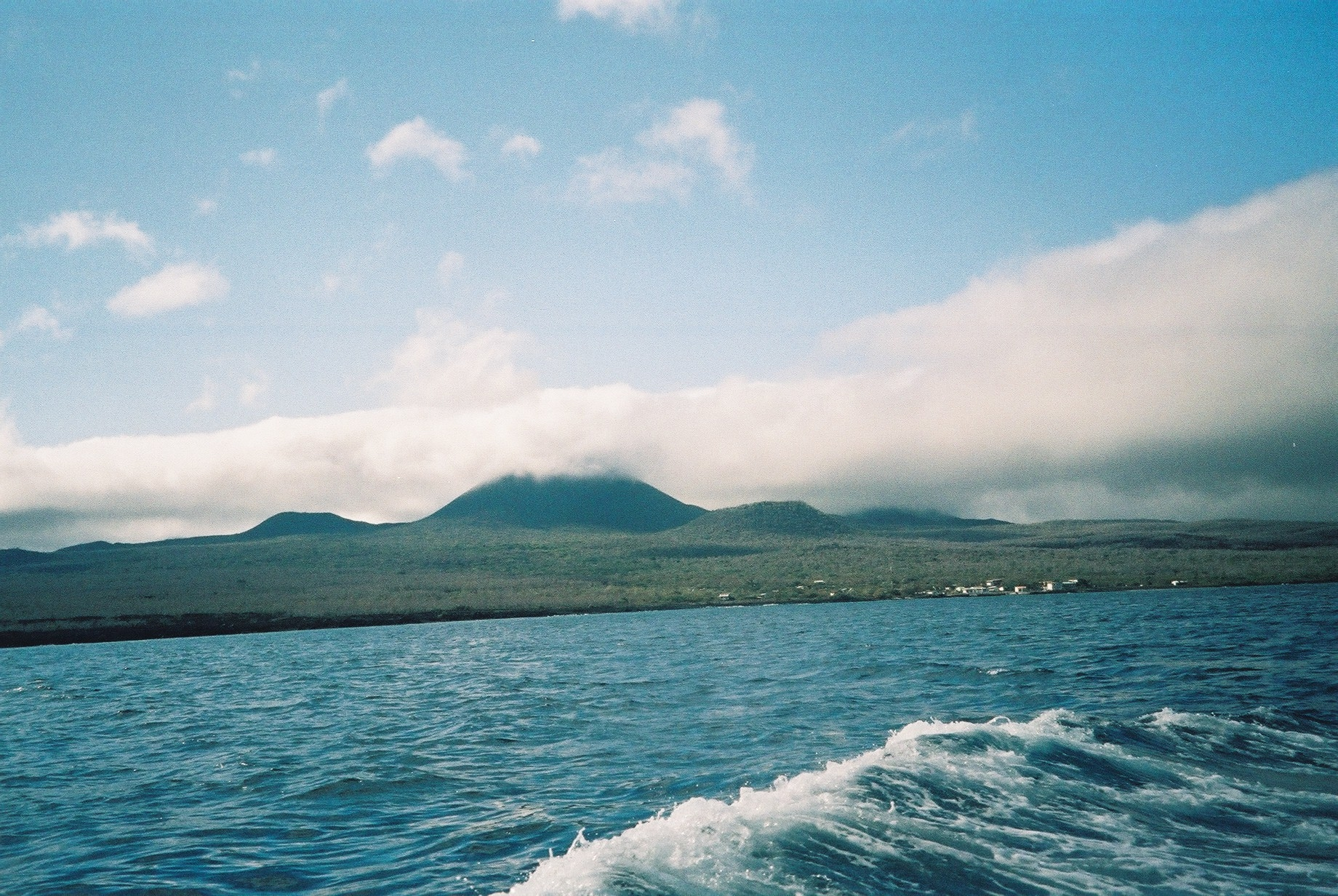
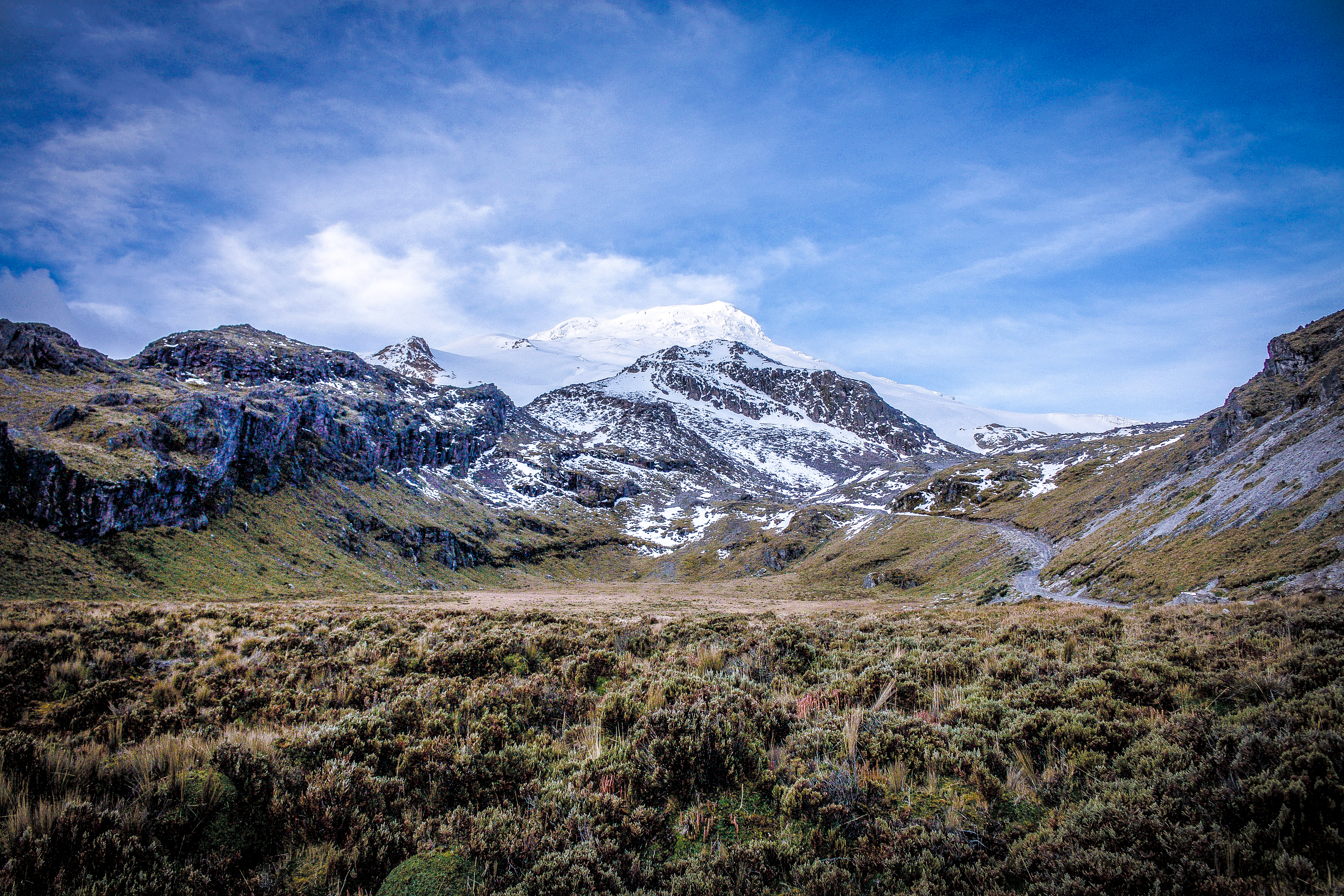
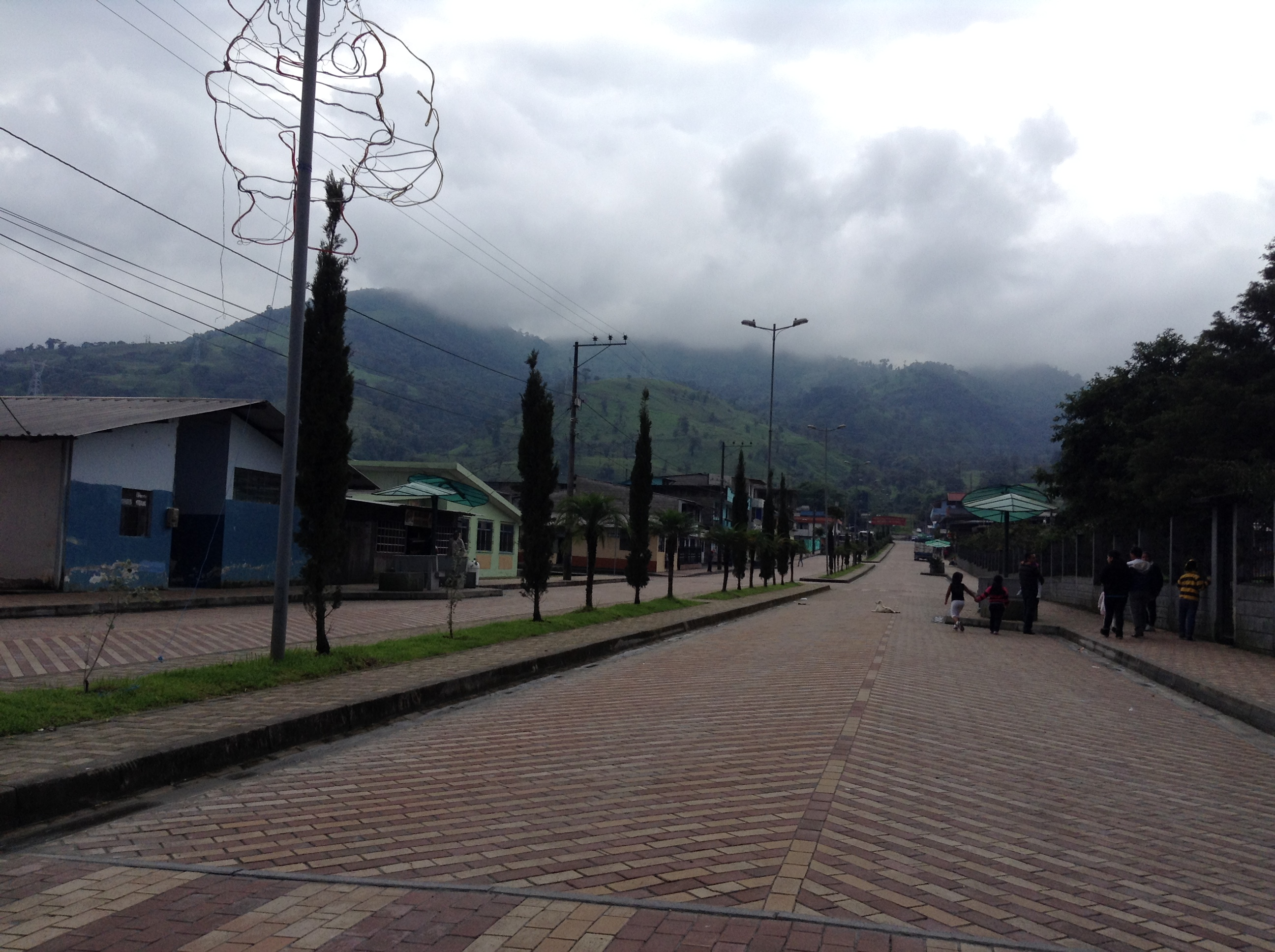
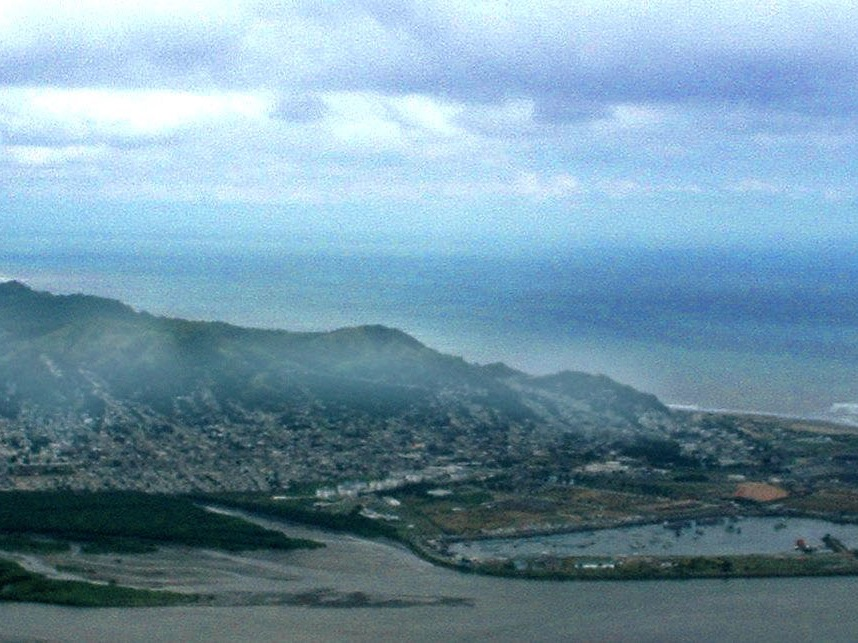
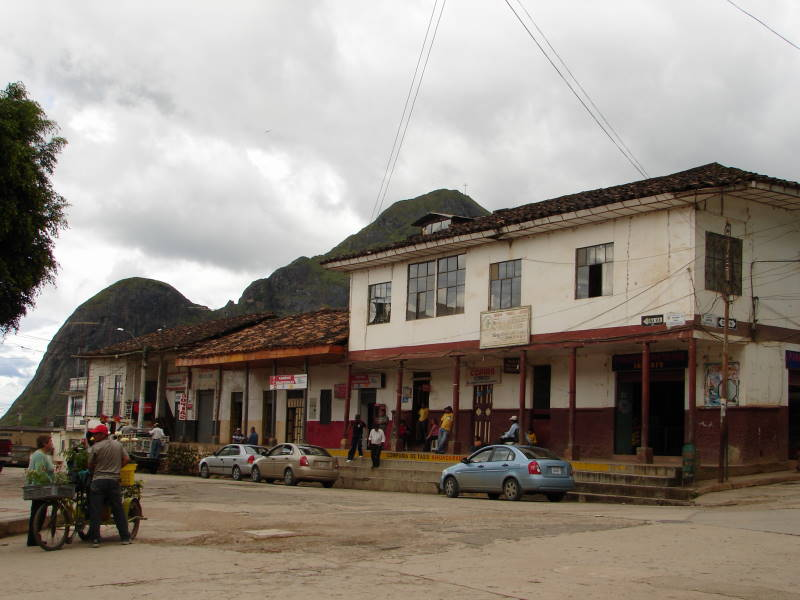
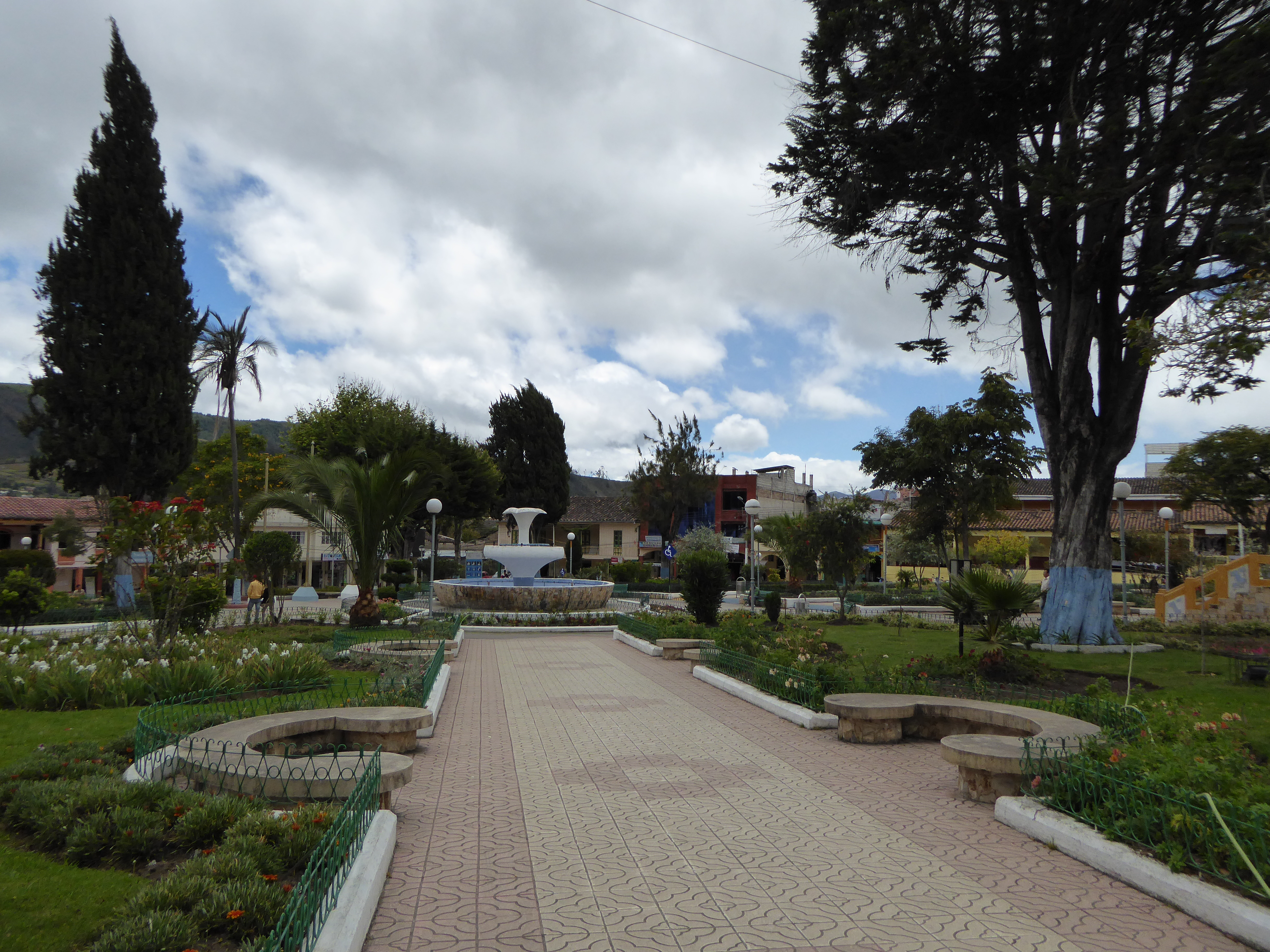
#	Image	Town	Province	Region	Named Pueblo Mágico
1		Patate	Tungurahua	Región Sierra	29 Sep 2019
2		Alausí	Chimborazo	Región Sierra	13 Nov 2019
3		Zaruma	El Oro	Región Costa	26 Nov 2019
4		Cotacachi	Imbabura	Región Sierra	29 Nov 2019
5		San Gabriel	Carchi	Región Sierra	18 Dec 2019
6		Portoviejo	Manabí	Región Costa	23 Sep 2020
7		Guano	Chimborazo	Región Sierra	25 Sep 2020
8		San Antonio de Ibarra	Imbabura	Región Sierra	25 Sep 2020
9		Rumiñahui	Pichincha	Región Sierra	11 Nov 2020
10		Azogues	Cañar	Región Sierra	1 Dec 2020
11		Chordeleg	Azuay	Región Sierra	1 Dec 2020
12		Agua Blanca	Manabí	Región Costa	11 Dec 2020
13		Shushufindi	Sucumbíos	Región Amazónica	7 Jan 2021
14		Lago Agrio	Sucumbíos	Región Amazónica	8 Jan 2021
15		Pimampiro	Imbabura	Región Sierra	12 Jan 2021
16		Isla Floreana	Galápagos	Región Galápagos	15 Jan 2021
17		Cayambe	Pichincha	Región Sierra	26 Feb 2021
18		El Chaco	Napo	Región Amazónica	2 Mar 2021
19		Esmeraldas	Esmeraldas	Región Costa	10 Mar 2021
20		Calvas	Loja	Región Sierra	18 Mar 2021
21		Saraguro	Loja	Región Sierra	19 Mar 2021

== See also ==
- Pueblos Mágicos (Mexico)
- Pueblo Patrimonio (Colombia)
- Pueblos Pintorescos (Guatemala)
