= Patricio Quiñónez =

Ecuadorian footballer (born 1986)

Personal information
- Full name: Patricio Javier Quiñonez Portilla
- Date of birth: 8 August 1986 (age 40)
- Place of birth: Esmeraldas, Ecuador
- Height: 1.86 m (6 ft 1 in)
- Position: Forward

Team information
- Current team: Millesimo

Youth career
- ????-2003: Club Tácito Ortiz Urriola
- 2004: Deportivo Quito

Senior career*
Years	Team	Apps	(Gls)
2003–2006	Deportivo Patate	9+	(6+)
2006	Cumandá	4+	(0+)
2007-2008	Deportivo Morona (loan)	13+	(4+)
2008–2009	Deportivo Azogues	28	(2)
2010	Tecnico Universitario (loan)	24	(0)
2011	UT Cotopaxi	37	(11)
2012-2014	Deportivo Quevedo	64	(16)
2012	→ Manta (loan)	1	(0)
2015	→ Guayaquil City (loan)	24	(2)
2016	LDU Loja	39	(12)
2017	Mushuc Runa	29	(6)
2018	Deportivo Quevedo	?	(?)
2019	Toreros	?	(?)
2020	Barcelona SC B	?	(?)
2020–2021	Libertad FC	?	(?)
2021	Emanuel	?	(?)
2021-2022	Atacames	?	(?)
2022	Halley	?	(?)
2023-2024	Millesimo	16	(7)
2024	New Bragno	9	(0)
2024-2025	Millesimo	14	(4)
2025-2026	Altarese	19	(6)
- * Club domestic league appearances and goals

Patricio Javier Quiñonez Portilla (born 8 August 1986) is an Ecuadorian former professional footballer who played as a forward.

== Career ==
He was signed for Deportivo Patate in 2003, making his first team debut within that season. He was loaned to Deportivo Quito where he played in the U-18 team for part of the 2004 season.

Quiñónez made his first appearances in the LigaPro with Deportivo Azogues in 2008, remaining with the team even after their relegation to the Serie B. After that, he spent another two and a half years in the second division before joining Manta on loan. Here, he mainly played for the reserve team, making only one LigaPro appearance in mid-season.

He played two years for Deportivo Quevedo: while he was rarely used during the 2013 season, which ended with relegation to the second tier, he scored 14 goals in the following one, which represents his career's most prolific season. He left for Guayaquil City on loan, playing his last games in LigaPro, and then joined LDU Loja and Mushuc Runa in Serie B. He made a total of 39 appearances (with 2 goals) in the LigaPro and 207 appearances (with 47 goals) in Serie B.

After 5 seasons in Segunda Categoría, the third division of the Ecuadorian Football Federation, he moved to Italy, where he joined Millesimo in Prima Categoria, the seventh level in the Italian football league system; in the 2023–2024 season the team achieved a double, winning both Group A of Prima Categoria Liguria and the regional category cup. He played the first half of the following season at Bragno in Promozione, then joined again Millesimo: the season ended with another title and consequently with the team's promotion to the fifth (and highest regional) level.

== Honours ==
Deportivo Patate

- Segunda Categoría de Tungurahua: 2005

Millesimo

- Promozione: 2024–25 (Liguria, Group A)
- Prima Categoria: 2023–24 (Liguria, Group A)
- Liguria Cup, Prima Categoria: 2023–24
