= Guano Canton =

- Canton
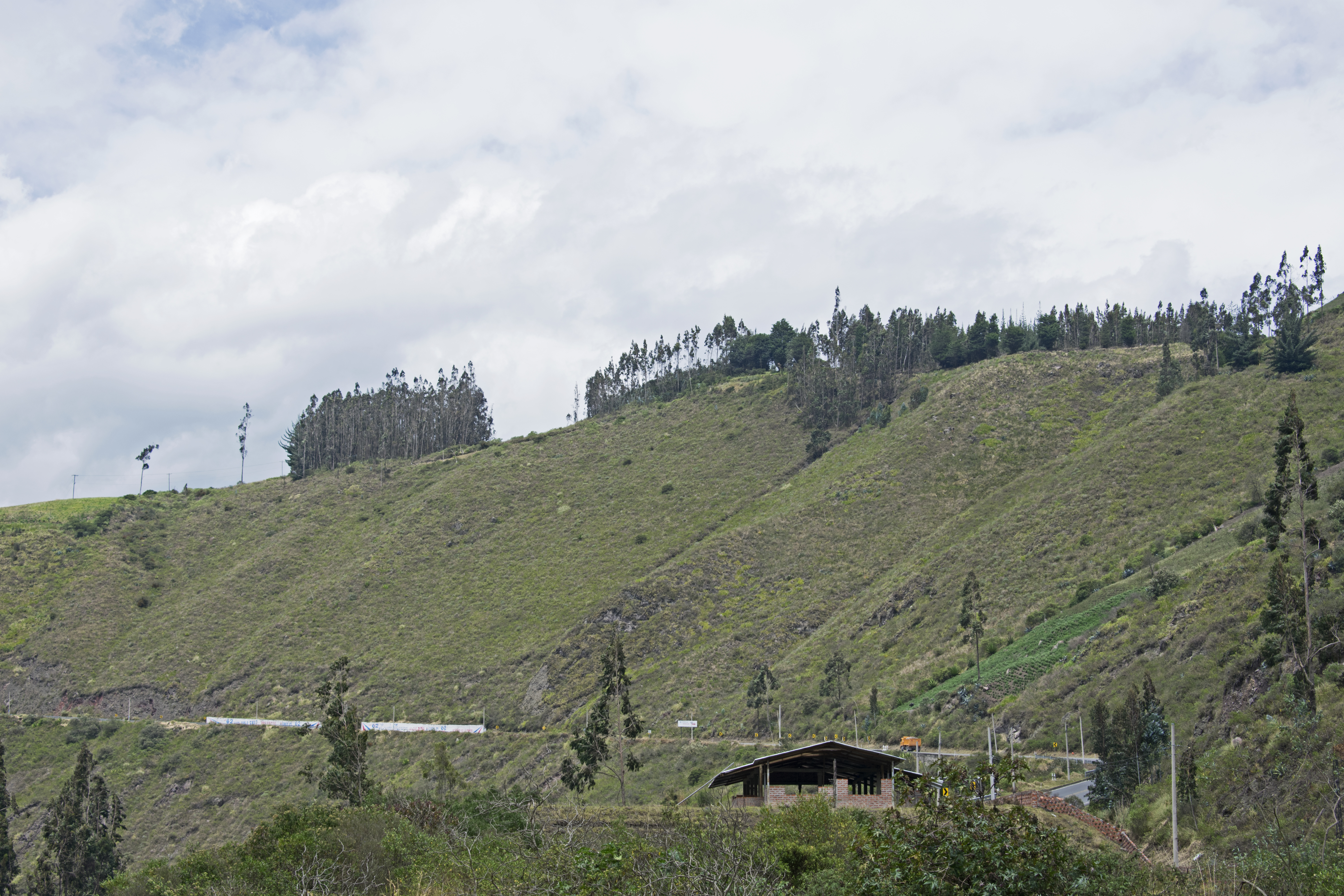
- E490 on the left bank of the Chambo River south of the bridge in Penipe

- Location of Chimborazo Province in Ecuador.

- Guano Canton in Chimborazo Province
- Coordinates: 01°35′0″S 78°38′0″W
- Country: Ecuador
- Province: Chimborazo Province

Area
  - Total: 464.8 km^{2} (179.5 sq mi)

Population (2022 census)
  - Total: 48,327
  - Density: 104.0/km^{2} (269.3/sq mi)
- Time zone: UTC-5 (ECT)

Guano Canton is a canton of Ecuador, located in the Chimborazo Province. Its capital is the town of Guano. Its population at the 2001 census was 37,888.
