= Pitcairnia aequatorialis =

Conservation status
- Endangered (IUCN 3.1)

Scientific classification
- Kingdom: Plantae
- Clade: Tracheophytes
- Clade: Angiosperms
- Clade: Monocots
- Clade: Commelinids
- Order: Poales
- Family: Bromeliaceae
- Genus: Pitcairnia
- Species: P. aequatorialis

Binomial name
- Pitcairnia aequatorialis L.B.Sm.

Species of flowering plant

Pitcairnia aequatorialis is a species of plant in the family Bromeliaceae. It is endemic to Ecuador, where it is known from only three subpopulations in Chimborazo Province.

It grows in forested habitat. It is sometimes found in disturbed habitat. None of its populations are in protected territory.
