= Rumiñawi =

Rumiñawi (Quechua for "stone eye", "stone face", "rock eye" or "rock face") may refer to:

- Rumiñahui Canton
- Rumiñawi (Inca warrior)
- Rumiñawi (volcano)
