= Pueblos Pintorescos (Guatemala) =

The Programa Pueblos Pintorescos ("Picturesque Towns Program") is an initiative led by Guatemala's Instituto Guatemalteco de Turismo, known as INGUAT. The program seeks to promote sustainable tourism development in a network of towns and cities that have been identified for their historical, cultural, and natural attributes.

Upon the program's establishment in August of 2019, a total of 9 cities and towns were identified by INGUAT as having the "relevant characteristics and initiatives" to be designated as Pueblos Pintorescos. This initial cohort of 9 communities is distributed among 7 of Guatemala's 22 departments.

== Inaugural Cohort of Pueblos Pintorescos ==
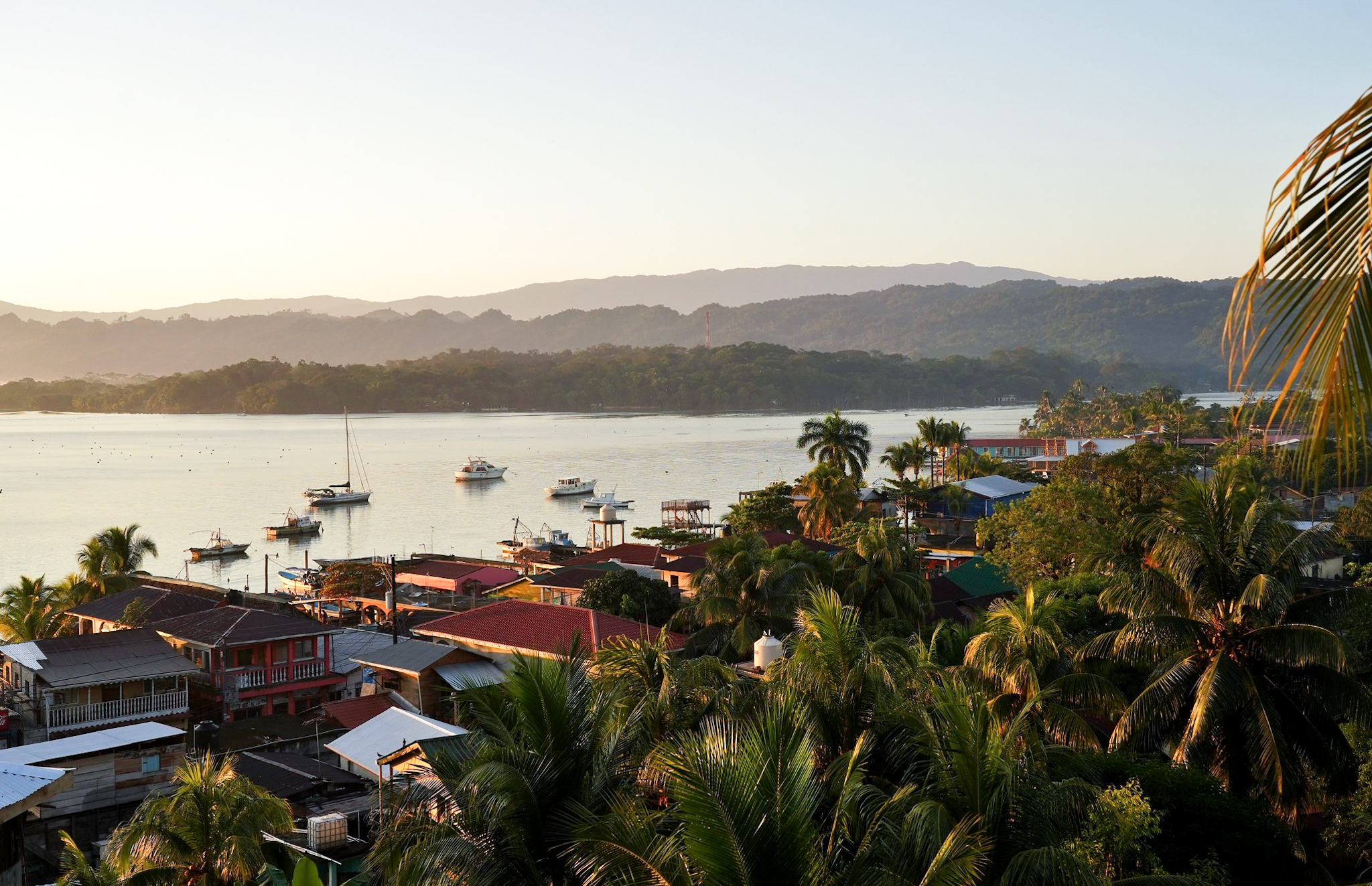
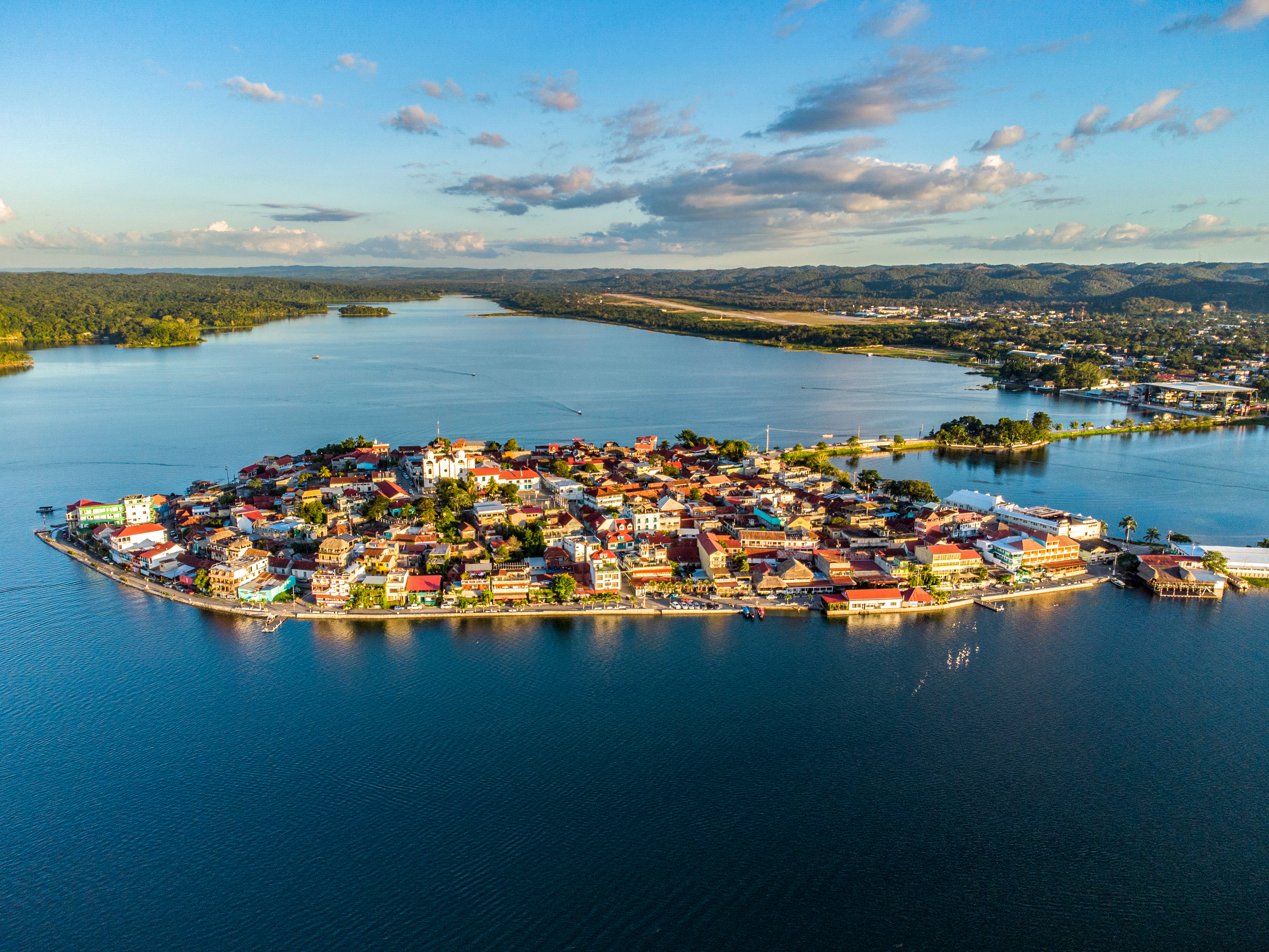
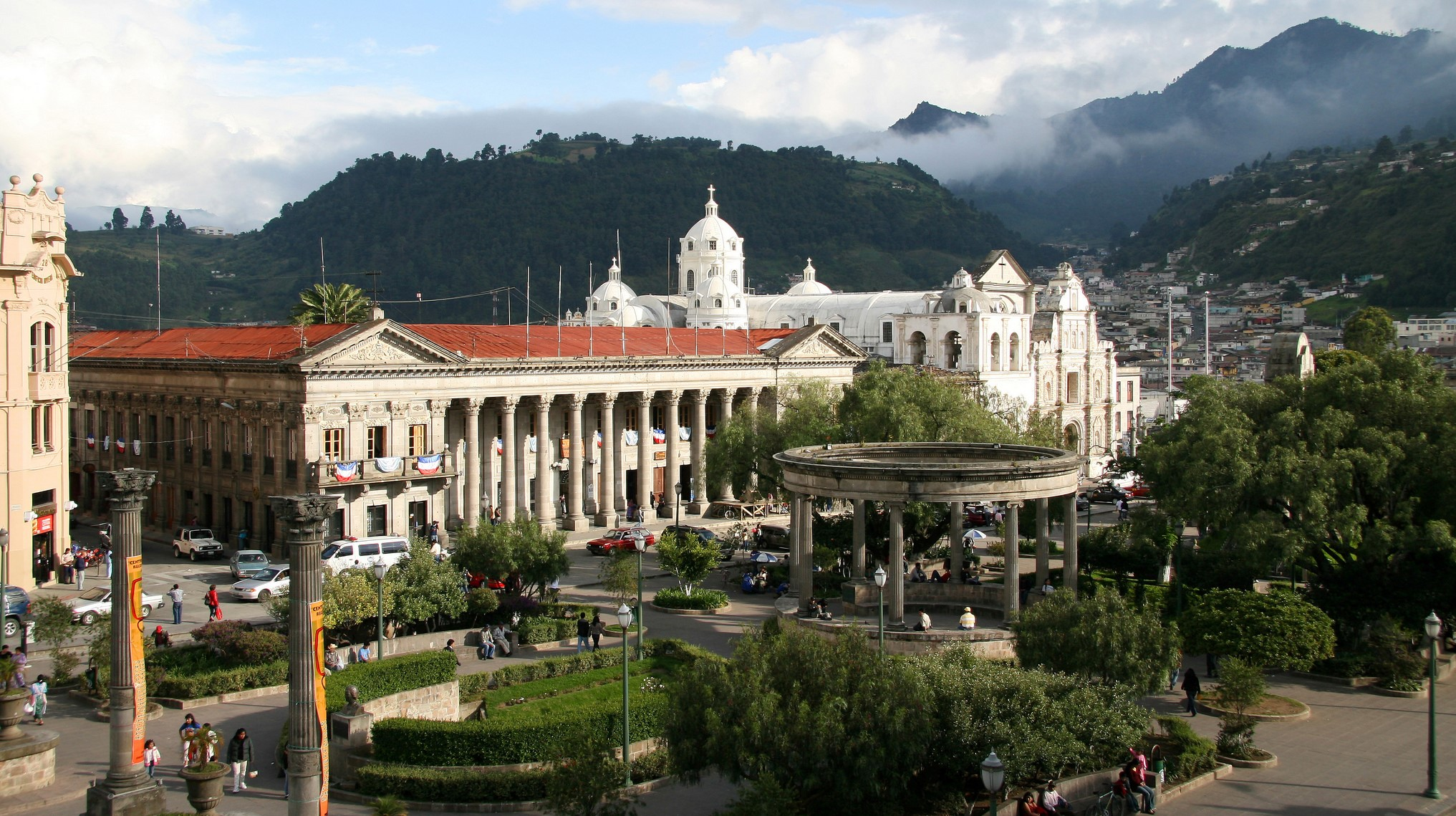
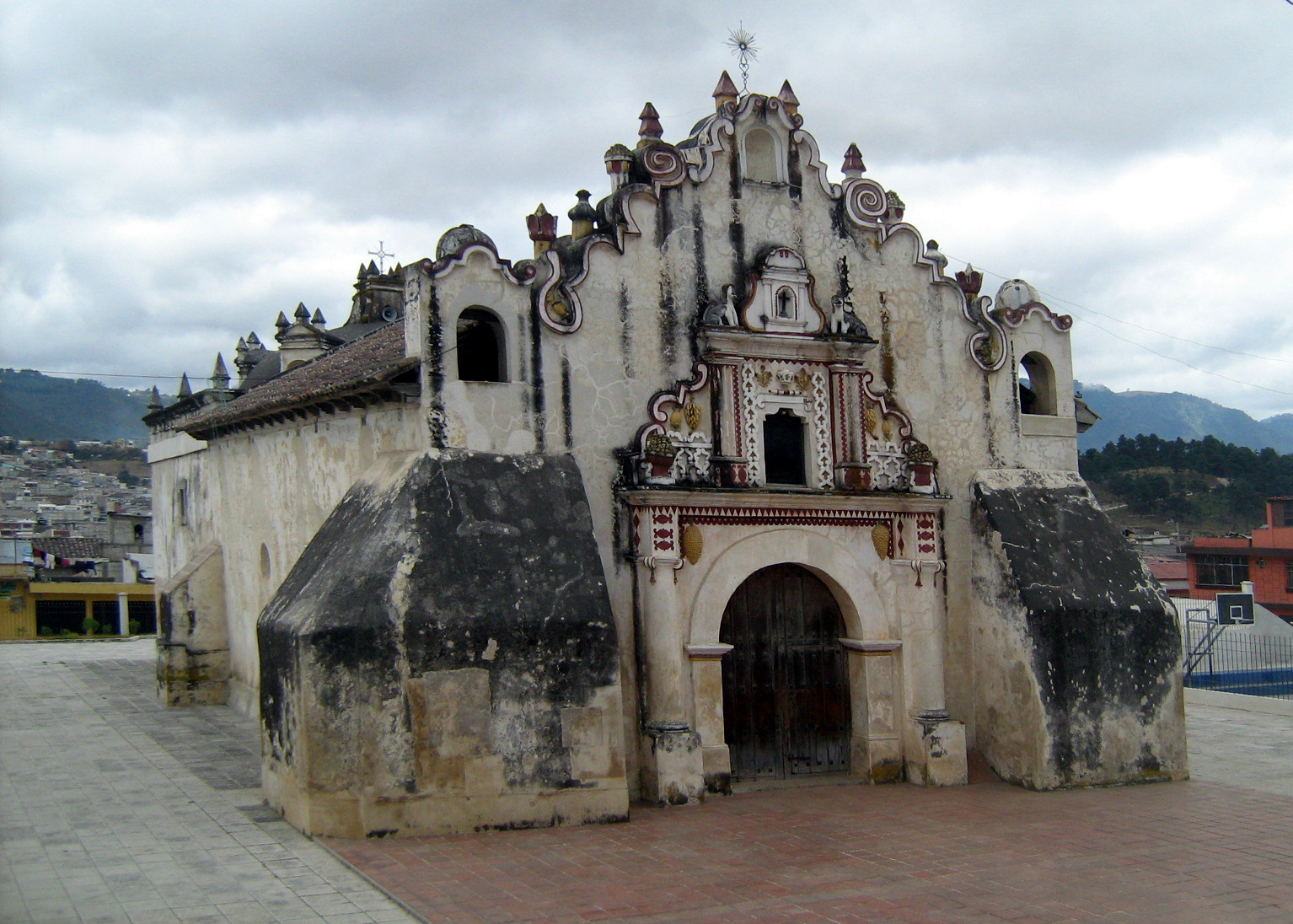
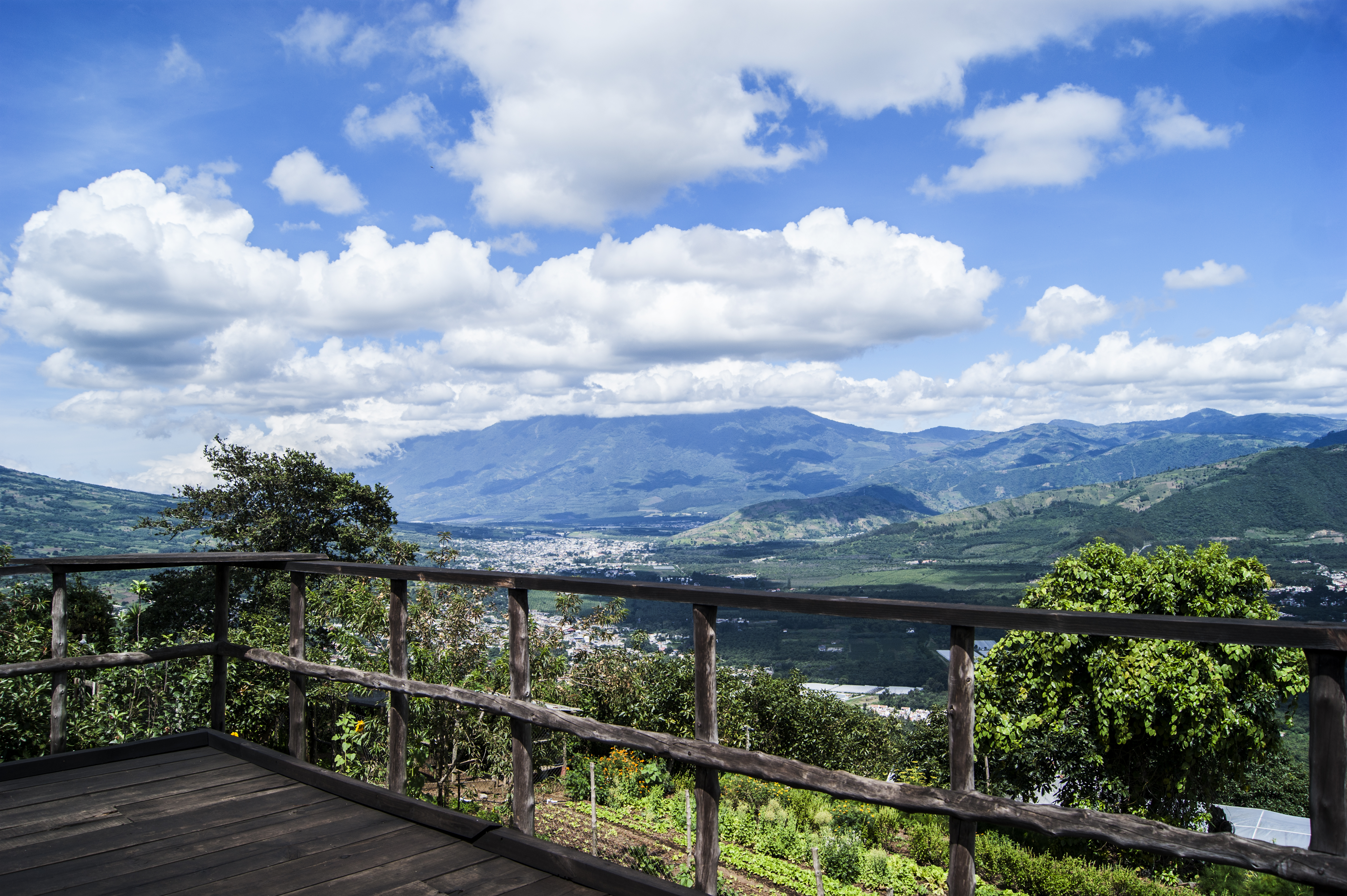
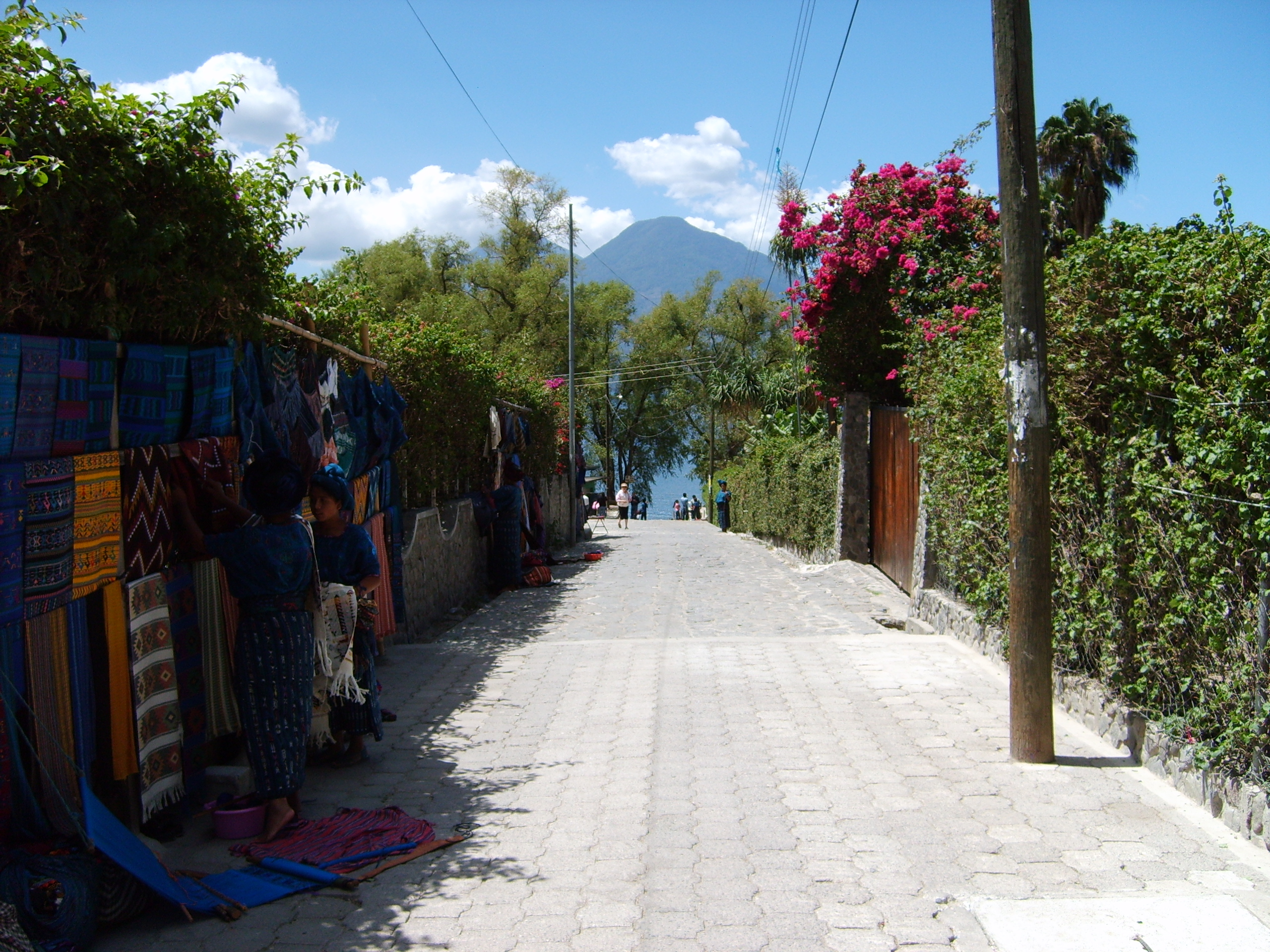
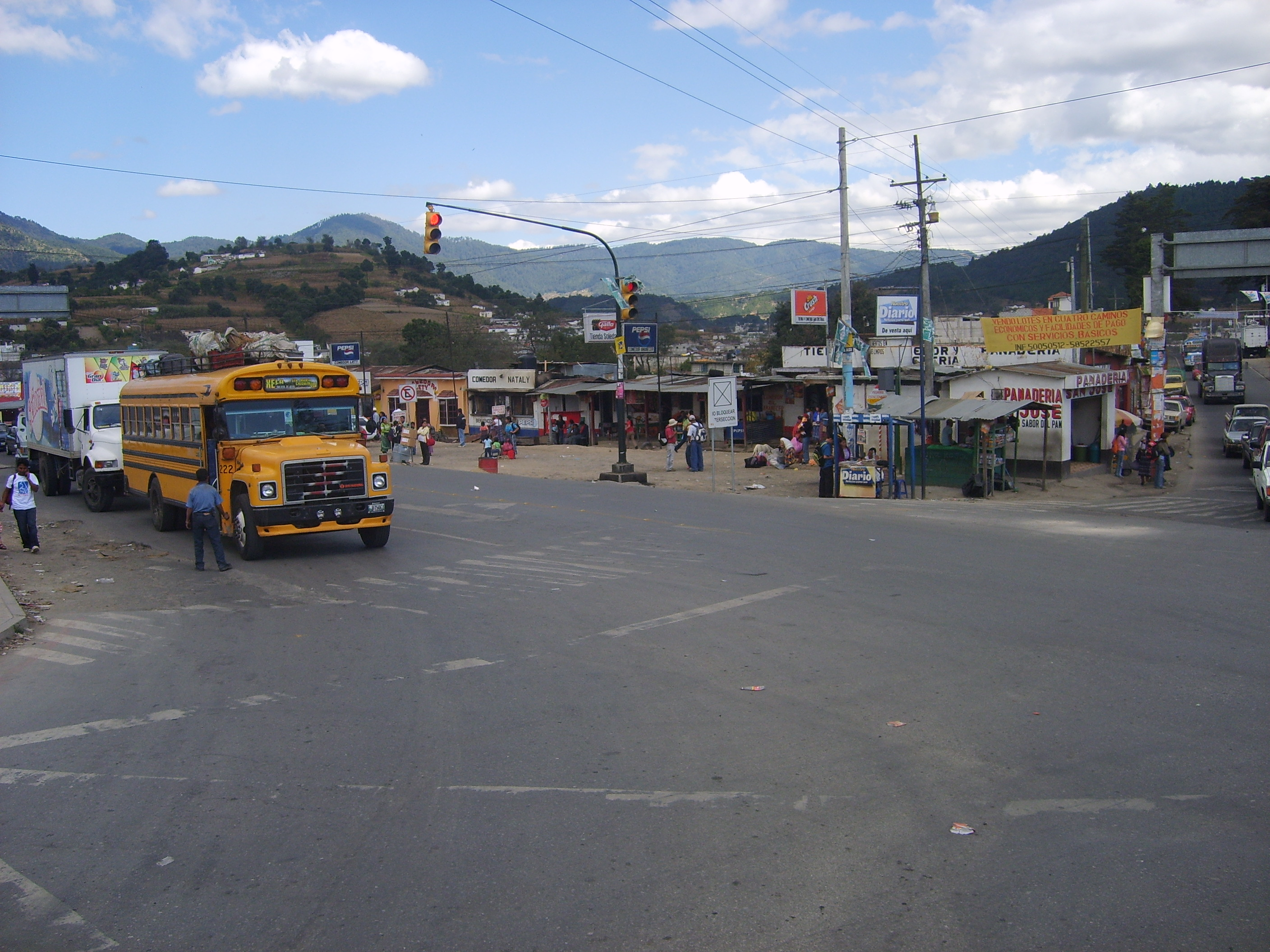
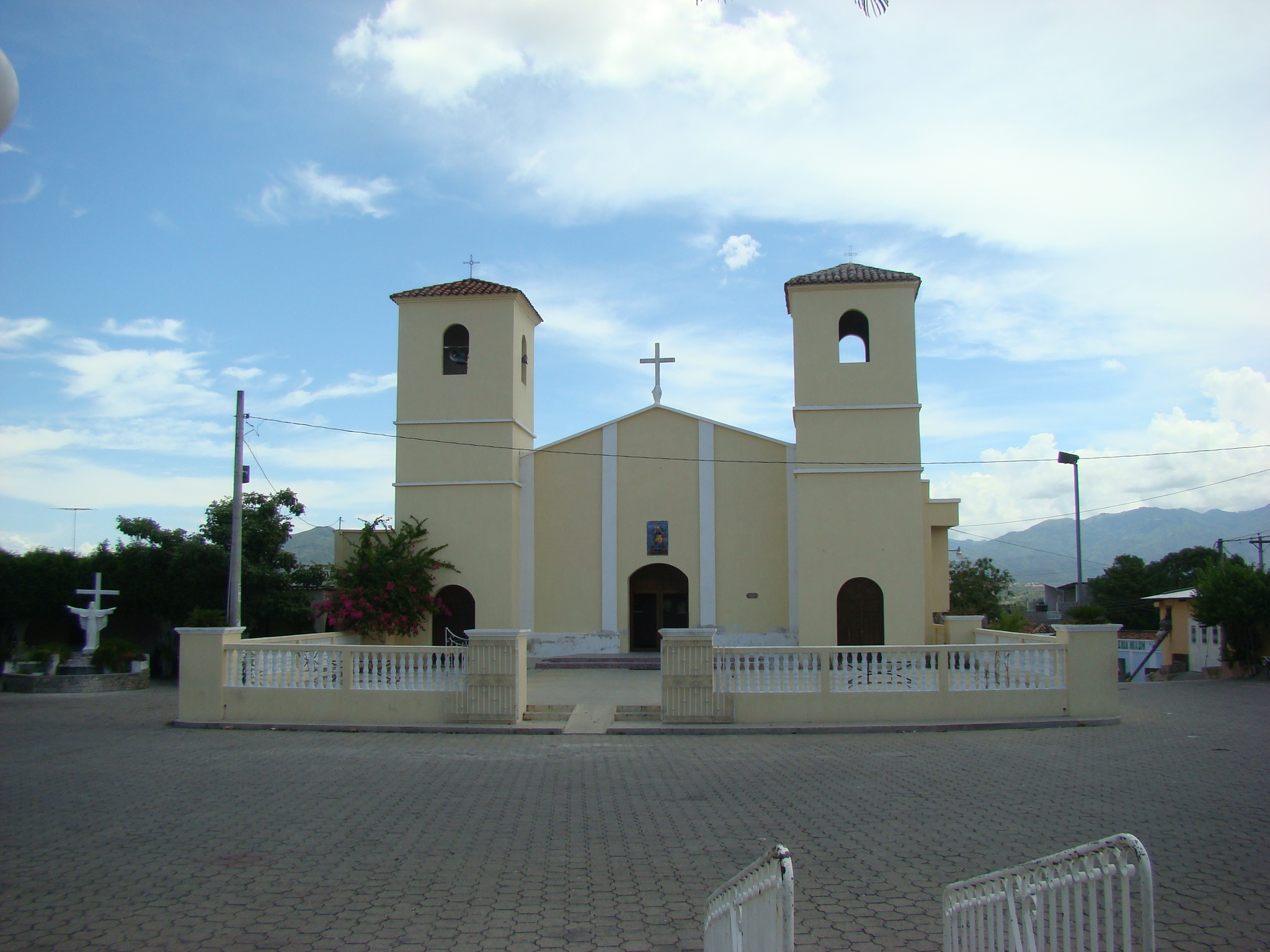
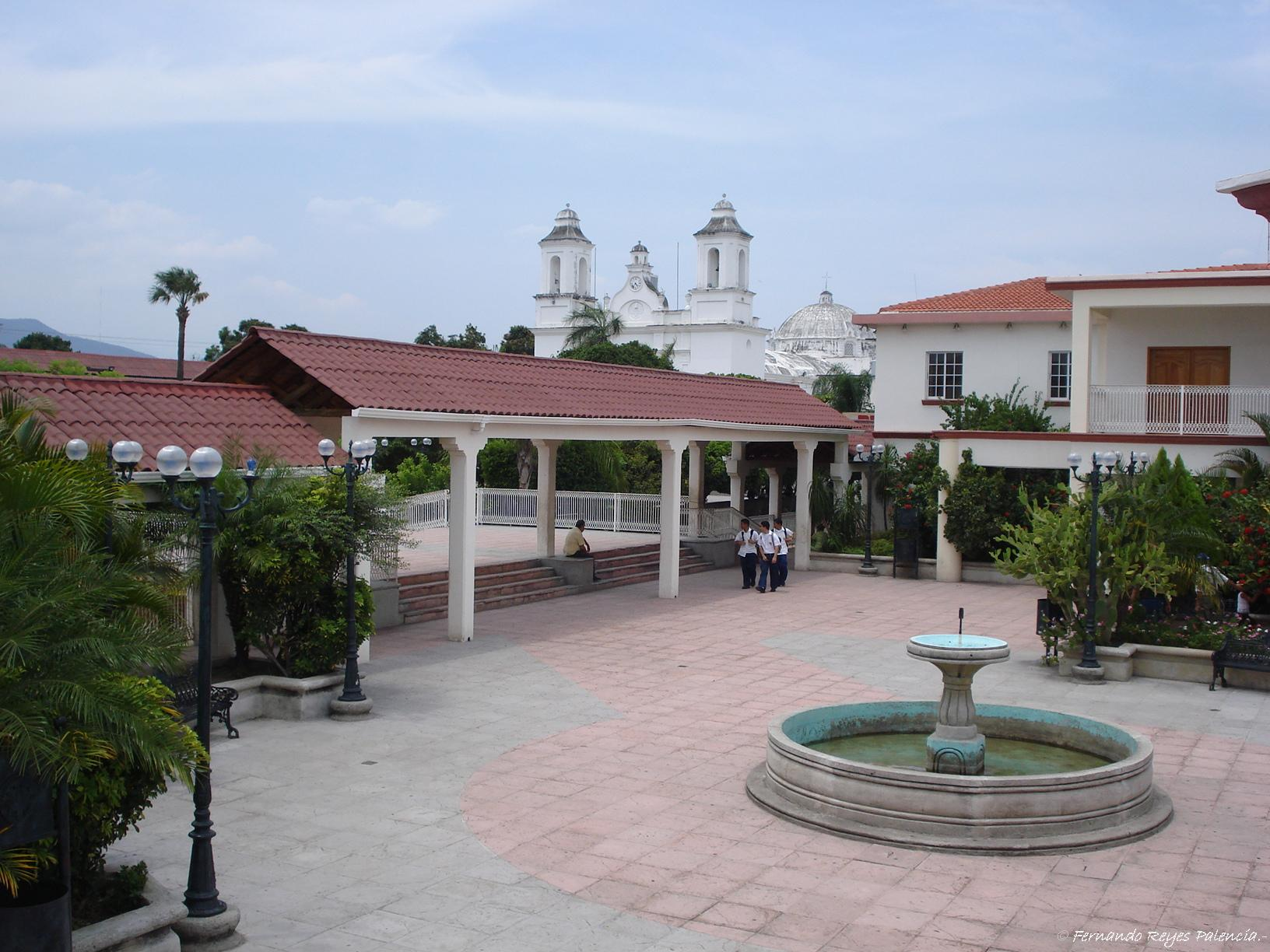
Image	Town	Department	Region	Citation
	Livingston	Izabal	Oriente
	Isla de Flores	Petén	El Petén
	Quetzaltenango	Quetzaltenango	Los Altos
	Salcajá	Quetzaltenango	Los Altos
	San Juan del Obispo	Sacatepéquez	Los Altos
	Santa Catarina Palopó	Sololá	Los Altos
	San Cristóbal Totonicapán	Totonicapán	Los Altos
	Estanzuela	Zacapa	Oriente
	Zacapa	Zacapa	Oriente

== See also ==
- Pueblos Mágicos (Mexico)
- Pueblos Mágicos (Ecuador)
- Pueblo Patrimonio (Colombia)
