= Chambo Canton =

- Canton
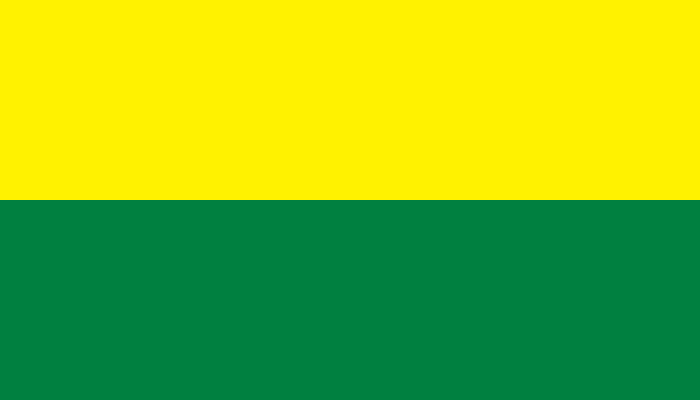
- Flag

- Location of Chimborazo Province in Ecuador.

- Chambo Canton in Chimborazo Province
- Coordinates: 01°44′0″S 78°35′0″W
- Country: Ecuador
- Province: Chimborazo Province

Area
  - Total: 166 km^{2} (64 sq mi)

Population (2022 census)
  - Total: 13,431
  - Density: 80.9/km^{2} (210/sq mi)
- Time zone: UTC-5 (ECT)

Chambo Canton is a canton of Ecuador, located in the Chimborazo Province. Its capital is the town of Chambo. Its population at the 2001 census was 10,541.
