= Cumandá Canton =

- Canton
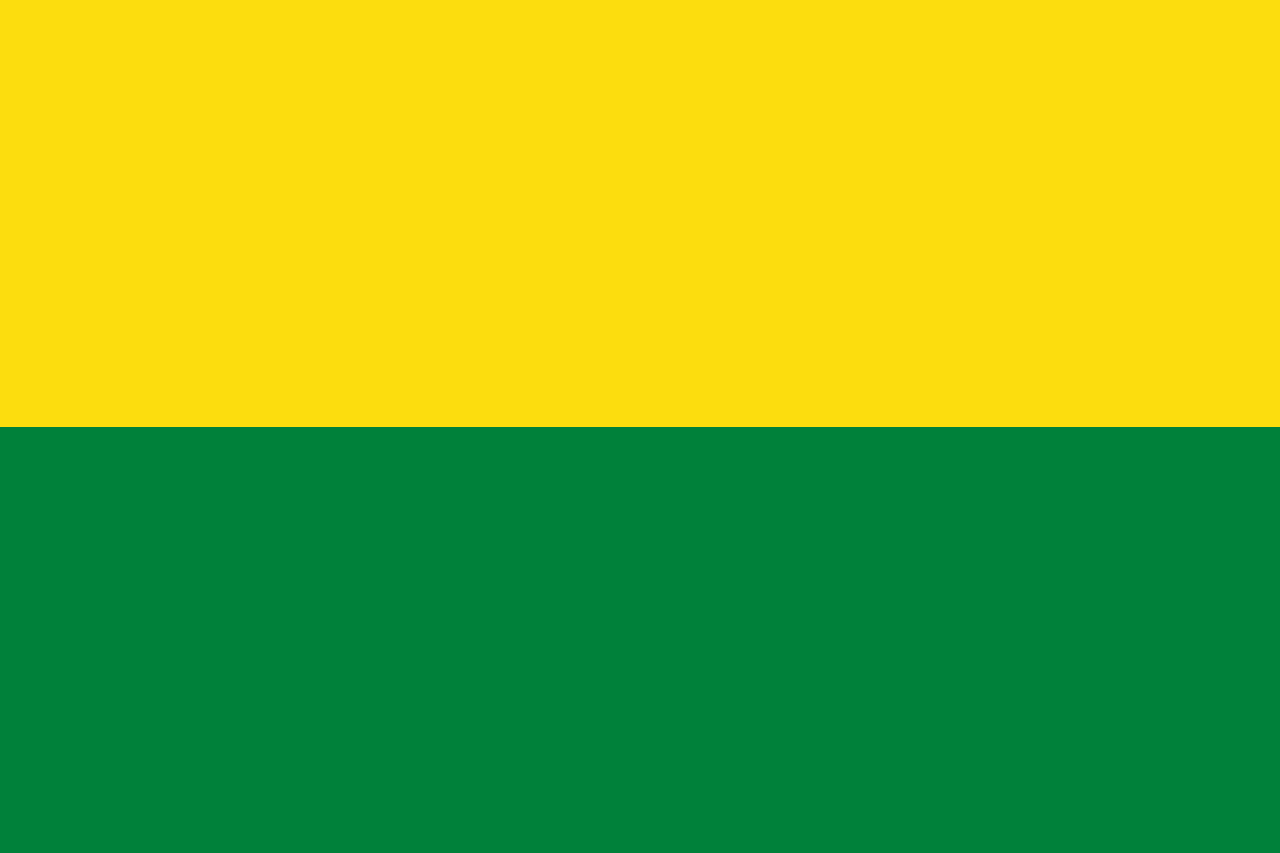
- Flag

- Location of Chimborazo Province in Ecuador.

- Cumandá Canton in Chimborazo Province
- Coordinates: 2°12′S 79°8′W
- Country: Ecuador
- Province: Chimborazo Province

Area
  - Total: 159.2 km^{2} (61.5 sq mi)

Population (2022 census)
  - Total: 16,602
  - Density: 104.3/km^{2} (270.1/sq mi)
- Time zone: UTC-5 (ECT)

Cumandá Canton is a canton of Ecuador, located in the Chimborazo Province. Its capital is the town of Cumandá. Its population at the 2001 census was 12,474.
