= Pallatanga Canton =

- Canton
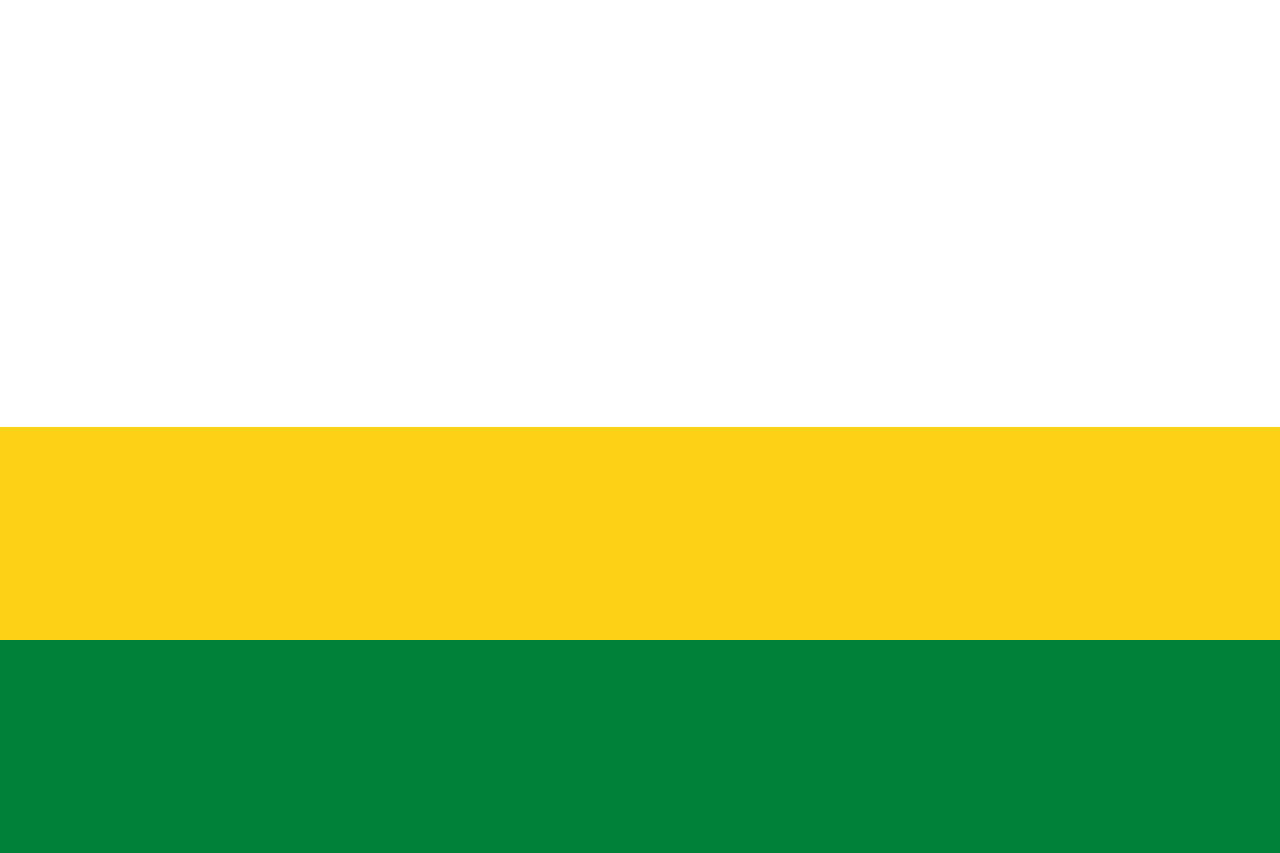
- Flag

- Location of Chimborazo Province in Ecuador.

- Pallatanga Canton in Chimborazo Province
- Coordinates: 01°59′0″S 78°57′0″W
- Country: Ecuador
- Province: Chimborazo Province

Area
  - Total: 379.9 km^{2} (146.7 sq mi)

Population (2022 census)
  - Total: 11,796
  - Density: 31.05/km^{2} (80.42/sq mi)
- Time zone: UTC-5 (ECT)

Pallatanga Canton is a canton of Ecuador, located in the Chimborazo Province. Its capital is the town of Pallatanga. Its population at the 2001 census was 10,800.
