= Guamote =

- Town
- Location within Ecuador
- Coordinates: 01°56′0″S 78°43′0″W
- Country: Ecuador
- Province: Chimborazo Province
- Canton: Guamote Canton

Government
  - Mayor: Segundo Miguel Marcatoma Lema

Area
  - Town: 2.44 km^{2} (0.94 sq mi)

Population (2022 census)
  - Town: 3,076
  - Density: 1,260/km^{2} (3,270/sq mi)
- Time zone: ECT

Guamote is a town in the Chimborazo Province, Ecuador. It is the seat of the Guamote Canton.

Guamote is located on Ecuador Highway 35, between Riobamba and Alausí. Ecuador Highway 46 branches in Guamote to the east and connects it with Macas, crossing Sangay National Park.

== Climate ==
Climate data for Guamote, elevation 3,020 m (9,910 ft)
Month	Jan	Feb	Mar	Apr	May	Jun	Jul	Aug	Sep	Oct	Nov	Dec	Year
Mean daily maximum °C (°F)	18.5 (65.3)	18.3 (64.9)	17.7 (63.9)	18.2 (64.8)	18.2 (64.8)	17.5 (63.5)	17.7 (63.9)	17.3 (63.1)	17.7 (63.9)	18.1 (64.6)	18.7 (65.7)	19.1 (66.4)	18.1 (64.6)
Daily mean °C (°F)	13.1 (55.6)	13.1 (55.6)	13.1 (55.6)	13.3 (55.9)	13.5 (56.3)	13.1 (55.6)	13.0 (55.4)	12.8 (55.0)	12.8 (55.0)	12.8 (55.0)	13.3 (55.9)	13.3 (55.9)	13.1 (55.6)
Mean daily minimum °C (°F)	5.1 (41.2)	5.5 (41.9)	5.8 (42.4)	5.5 (41.9)	5.5 (41.9)	5.0 (41.0)	4.5 (40.1)	4.9 (40.8)	4.9 (40.8)	4.9 (40.8)	4.4 (39.9)	4.4 (39.9)	5.0 (41.1)
Average precipitation mm (inches)	30.0 (1.18)	64.0 (2.52)	71.0 (2.80)	58.0 (2.28)	32.0 (1.26)	33.0 (1.30)	16.0 (0.63)	19.0 (0.75)	32.0 (1.26)	61.0 (2.40)	41.0 (1.61)	37.0 (1.46)	494 (19.45)
Source: FAO
