= Guamote Canton =

Guamote Canton Guamote
- Canton
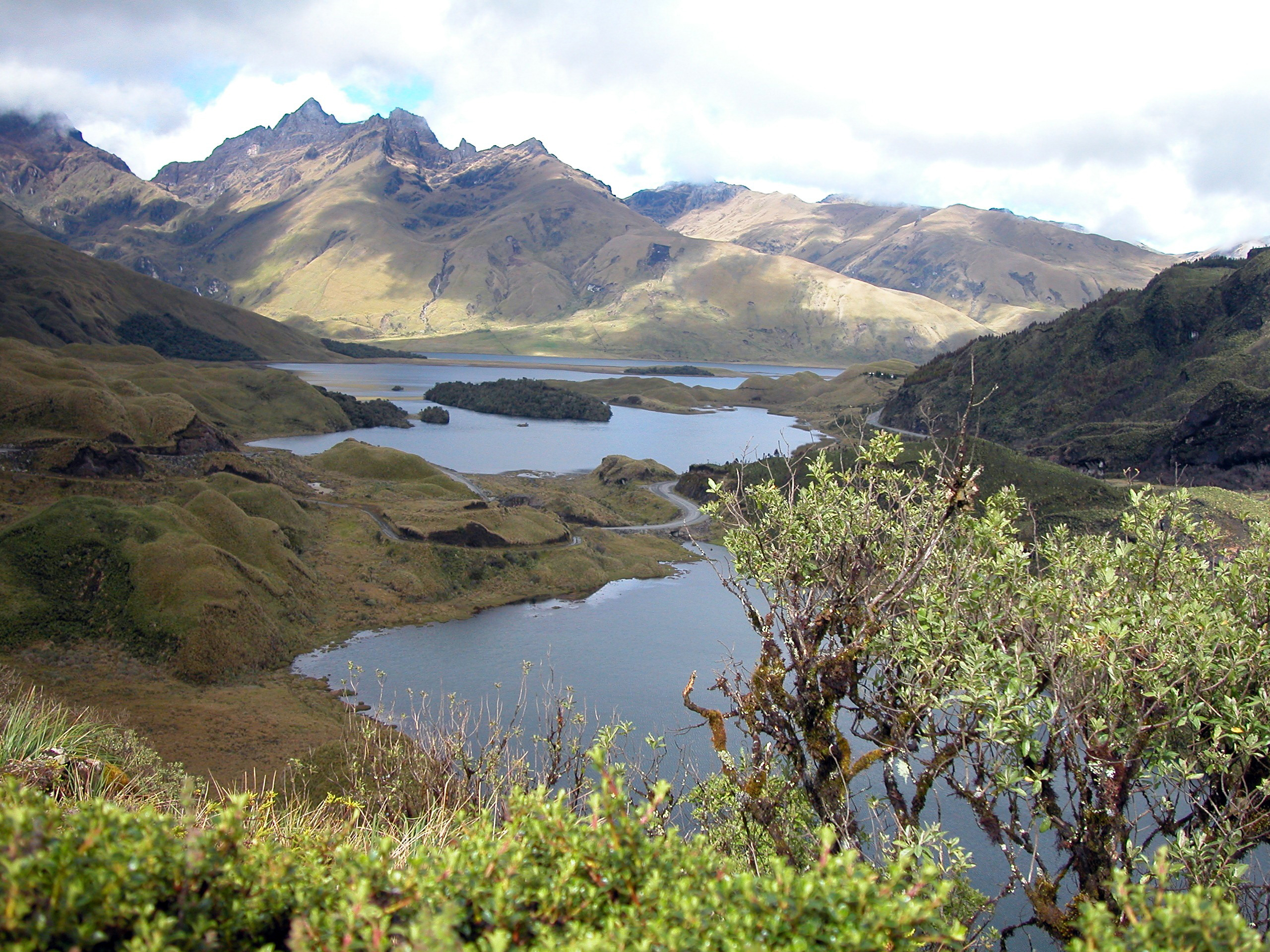
- Laguna de Atillo in the Guamote Canton, Sangay National Park
- Nickname: Guamote
- Location of Chimborazo Province in Ecuador.

- Guamote Canton in Chimborazo Province
- Coordinates: 01°56′0″S 78°43′0″W
- Country: Ecuador
- Province: Chimborazo Province

Government

Area
  - Total: 1,193 km^{2} (461 sq mi)

Population (2022 census)
  - Total: 35,769
  - Density: 29.98/km^{2} (77.65/sq mi)
- Time zone: UTC-5 (ECT)

Guamote Canton is a canton of Ecuador, located in the Chimborazo Province. Its capital is the town of Guamote. Its population at the 2001 census was 35,210.
