= Pallatanga =

- Location within Ecuador
- Coordinates: 01°59′0″S 78°57′0″W
- Country: Ecuador
- Province: Chimborazo Province
- Canton: Pallatanga Canton

Government
  - Mayor: Tomás Curicama Guaman

Area
  - Total: 1.57 km^{2} (0.61 sq mi)

Population (2022 census)
  - Total: 4,266
  - Density: 2,720/km^{2} (7,040/sq mi)
- Time zone: ECT

Pallatanga is a location in the Chimborazo Province, Ecuador. It is the seat of the Pallatanga Canton. The village is located in the foothills of the Andes Mountains in Chimborazo Province, Ecuador, about 2 and a half hours from Guayaquil, about 2 hours from Riobamba, and about 4 hours from Quito, the capital city of Ecuador. Pallatanga is known for horseback riding and cristal clear fresh water streams. It is a place where locals enjoy buying great produce from local markets. Pallatanga was a contestant in the national dance show, "Baila Ecuador" where cities all over Ecuador competed for the prize which was a special needs facility that would be built in the winning town. It also has green surrounding areas, villages filled with wooden cabins.

At first it was a rural part of the canton Colta. Then Pallatanga was cantonized in 1986. It was also the hold of incaic high born families until the 17th century. Later it was an Indian worker town in the early 1900s. The greatest achievement of the village was being the center of telegraphic communication between the capital Quito and the port city of Guayaquil for nearly 30 years. The work of several men such as Emilio Torres who arranged the telegraph cables in the wilderness was very important for this achievement.
