= Opportunitas aequa =

Canadian non-governmental organisation

Opportunitas Aequa, more commonly referred to as OA, is a Canadian non-governmental organization that aims to use soccer as a tool to create safer and healthier environments for at-risk and war affected children.

Formed by five university students in Victoria British Columbia, Canada, OA's debut project involved the collection of soccer equipment, on Vancouver Island, British Columbia, followed by the collaboration of OA members and the local Ecuadorian people to distribute that equipment and construct two soccer fields, in Chimborazo, Ecuador.

The organization currently has an ongoing project in Rwanda, and is set to launch a pilot project in Northern Uganda, in the spring of 2009.

In July and August 2008, during OA's pilot project in Rwanda, a team of 5 volunteers helped to re-build 1 soccer field, to distribute soccer resources to five local programs and to run a week-long soccer camp for the orphans of the Rebero Orphan Center in Kigali.

Opportunitas Aequa utilizes the Vancouver-based charitable foundation Give Meaning in order to allow tax-deductible donations, regardless of the donation amount. For OA's project in Rwanda, the group raised approximately $6,000 through GiveMeaning, while emphasizing the ability of small contributions to lead to great change.

OA offers podcasts, blogging, pictures, and other media via aoprojects.org and other media websites (e.g., YouTube) that are intended to allow their audience to experience the hands-on work being done.
