= Chambo =

- Town
- Location within Ecuador
- Coordinates: 01°44′0″S 78°35′0″W
- Country: Ecuador
- Province: Chimborazo Province
- Canton: Chambo Canton

Government
  - Mayor: Ivan Pazmiño Núñez

Area
  - Town: 2.25 km^{2} (0.87 sq mi)

Population (2022 census)
  - Town: 5,462
  - Density: 2,430/km^{2} (6,290/sq mi)
- Time zone: ECT
- Website: https://web.archive.org/web/20100124065956/http://www.municipiochambo.gov.ec/

Chambo is a town in Chimborazo Province, Ecuador. It is the county seat of the Chambo Canton. It is also the birthplace of former Ecuadorian president Osvaldo Hurtado (1981–84) as well as notable 19th-century educator Leopoldo Freire, entrepreneur Alejandrino Capelo, and educator Jorge Capelo Freire. It was a stronghold of conservative Catholic resistance to the 1895 Liberal Revolution and is now one of the largest towns in Chimborazo province and the closest major urban center to the provincial capital of Riobamba.

== See also ==
- Chambo River
