= Rumiñahui Canton =

Coordinates: 0°13′S 78°31′W

Rumiñahui Rumiñawi
- Canton
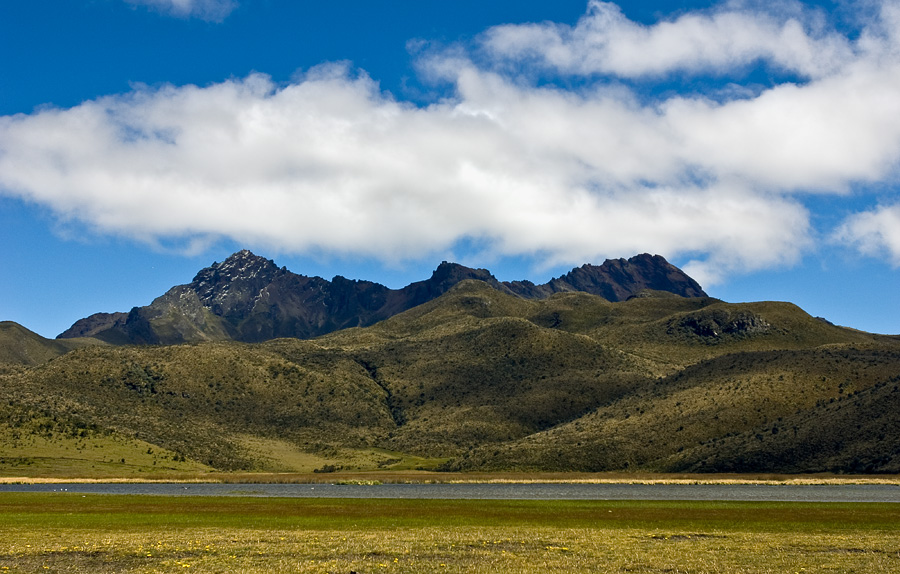
- Rumiñahui and Lake Limpiopunku

- Flag

- Location of Pichincha Province in Ecuador.

- Rumiñahui Canton in Pichincha Province
- Country: Ecuador
- Province: Pichincha Province
- Capital: Sangolquí
- Established: 31 May 1938

Area
  - Total: 135.3 km^{2} (52.2 sq mi)

Population (2022 census)
  - Total: 107,904
  - Density: 797.5/km^{2} (2,066/sq mi)
- Time zone: UTC-5 (ECT)
- Website: http://www.ruminahui.gob.ec

Rumiñahui (in Hispanicized spelling, [rumiˈɲawi]) or Rumiñawi (Quechua rumi stone, ñawi eye, "stone eye") is a canton of Pichincha Province in Ecuador. Its seat is Sangolquí. The canton lies southeast of Quito Canton and forms a suburb of Quito.

Rumiñahui was named a Pueblo Mágico by the Ecuadorian Ministry of Tourism (MINTUR) in 2020. It was the first canton in Pichincha to be awarded that distinction.

== Parishes ==
The canton is made up of the following parishes:

- Urban parishes: Sangolquí, Taboada
- Rural parishes: Cotogchoa, Rumipamba

== See also ==
- Rumiñawi (Inca warrior)
- Rumiñawi (volcano)
