= Chunchi Canton =

- Canton
- Location of Chimborazo Province in Ecuador.

- Chunchi Canton in Chimborazo Province
- Coordinates: 02°17′0″S 78°55′0″W
- Country: Ecuador
- Province: Chimborazo Province

Area
  - Total: 272.4 km^{2} (105.2 sq mi)

Population (2022 census)
  - Total: 10,635
  - Density: 39.04/km^{2} (101.1/sq mi)
- Time zone: UTC-5 (ECT)

Chunchi Canton is a canton of Ecuador, located in the Chimborazo Province. Its capital is the town of Chunchi. Its population at the 2001 census was 12,474.
