= Cumandá =

- Location within Ecuador
- Coordinates: 2°12′21″S 79°8′2″W
- Country: Ecuador
- Province: Chimborazo Province
- Canton: Cumandá Canton

Government
  - Alcalde: Eliana Medina

Area
  - Total: 3.24 km^{2} (1.25 sq mi)

Population (2022 census)
  - Total: 11,442
  - Density: 3,530/km^{2} (9,150/sq mi)
- Time zone: UTC-5 (ECT)
- Area code: 593-4
- Website: www.cumanda.gob.ec

Cumandá is a location in the Chimborazo Province, Ecuador. It is the seat of the Cumandá Canton.
