= Chunchi, Ecuador =

Chunchi
- Town
- Location within Ecuador
- Coordinates: 02°17′0″S 78°55′0″W
- Country: Ecuador
- Province: Chimborazo Province
- Canton: Chunchi Canton

Government
  - Mayor: Carlos Aguirre

Area
  - Town: 0.73 km^{2} (0.28 sq mi)

Population (2022 census)
  - Town: 3,799
  - Density: 5,200/km^{2} (13,000/sq mi)
- Time zone: ECT
- Website: https://web.archive.org/web/20090503181802/http://www.municipiodechunchi.gov.ec/

Chunchi is a town in the Chimborazo Province, Ecuador. It is the seat of the Chunchi Canton.
