= Guano, Ecuador =

Guano Wanu
- Town
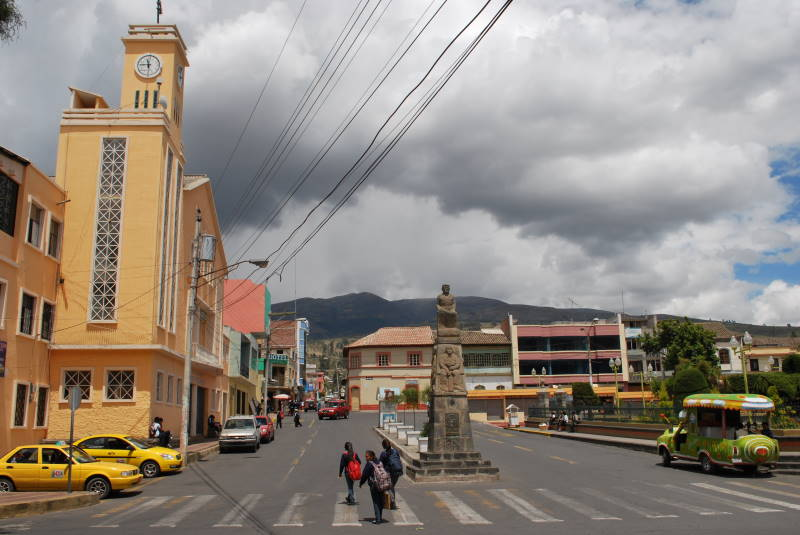
- Central plaza in Guano

- Location within Ecuador
- Coordinates: 01°35′0″S 78°38′0″W
- Country: Ecuador
- Province: Chimborazo Province
- Canton: Guano Canton

Government
  - Mayor: Oswaldo Vinicio Estrada Aviles

Area
  - Town: 4.86 km^{2} (1.88 sq mi)

Population (2022 census)
  - Town: 9,136
  - Density: 1,880/km^{2} (4,870/sq mi)
- Time zone: ECT
- Website: http://www.municipiodeguano.gov.ec/

Guano is a location in the Chimborazo Province, Ecuador. It is the seat of the Guano Canton. The town is well known for its handmade leather products and ornate rugs.

Surrounded by landscapes of mountains and overshadowed by the nearby active volcano, El Altar, the town features a variety of attractions and activities. Small in size, it can be explored easily on foot.
