= Penipe Canton =

- Canton
- Location of Chimborazo Province in Ecuador.

- Penipe Canton in Chimborazo Province
- Coordinates: 1.5573°S 78.5396°W
- Country: Ecuador
- Province: Chimborazo Province
- Capital: Penipe
- Time zone: UTC-5 (ECT)

Penipe Canton is a canton of Ecuador, located in the Chimborazo Province. Its capital is the town of Penipe. Its population at the 2001 census was 6,485.

The canton consists of one urban parish, Penipe Parish and six rural ones:

- Bayushig Parish
- Bilbao Parish
- La Candelaria Parish
- El Altar Parish
- Matus Parish
- Puela Parish
