= Chimborazo Province =

Province of Ecuador

Coordinates: 1°40′S 78°39′W

Chimborazo
- Province
- Province of Chimborazo
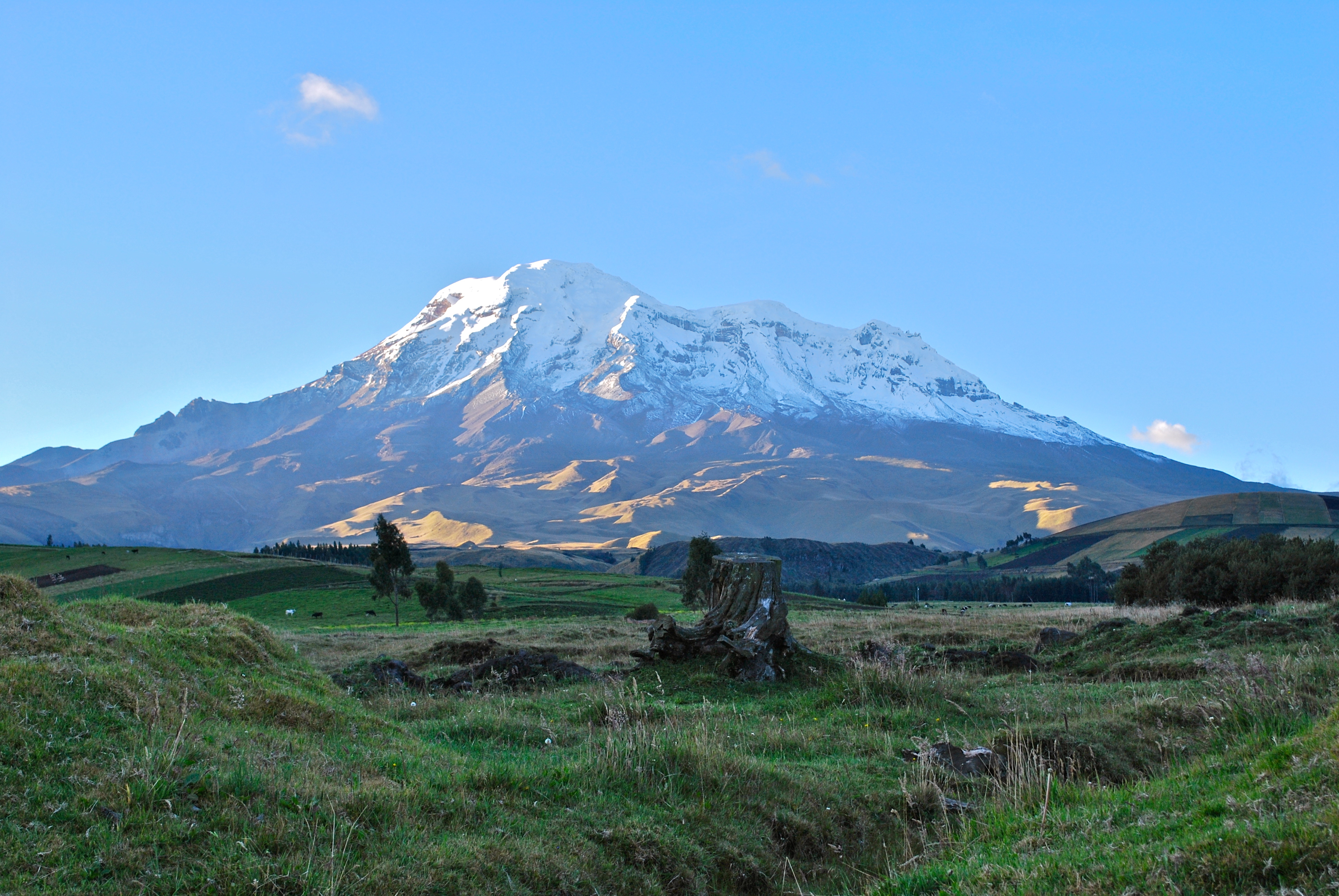
- Chimborazo volcano

- Flag
- Nickname: La Sultana de Los Andes; English: The Sultaness of The Andes
- Chimborazo Province in Ecuador

- Cantons of Chimborazo Province
- Country: Ecuador
- Legal establishment: June 25, 1826
- Named after: Volcan Chimborazo
- Capital: Riobamba
- Cantons: List of cantons: Alausí; Chambo; Chunchi; Colta; Cumandá; Guamote; Guano; Pallatanga; Penipe; Riobamba

Government
  - Prefect: Hermel Tayupanda (ID)
  - Vice Prefect: Mónica Loza
  - Governor: Eduardo Puyol

Area
  - Total: 6,110 km^{2} (2,360 sq mi)

Population (2022 census)
  - Total: 471,933
  - Density: 77.2/km^{2} (200/sq mi)
- Time zone: UTC-5 (ECT)
- Vehicle registration: H
- HDI (2017): 0.718 high · 16th
- Website: www.chimborazo.gov.ec

Chimborazo (Spanish pronunciation: [tʃimboˈɾaso]) is a province in the central Ecuadorian Andes. It is a home to a section of Sangay National Park. The capital is Riobamba. The province contains Chimborazo (6,267 m), Ecuador's highest mountain.

== Cantons ==
The province is divided into 10 cantons. The following table lists each with its population at the time of the 2010 census, its area in square kilometres (km^{2}), and the name of the canton seat or capital.

| Canton | Pop. (2010) | Area (km^{2}) | Seat/Capital |
|---|---|---|---|
| Alausí | 44,089 | 1,644 | Alausí |
| Chambo | 11,885 | 163 | Chambo |
| Chunchi | 12,686 | 273 | Chunchi |
| Colta | 44,971 | 829 | Cajabamba |
| Cumandá | 12,922 | 159 | Cumandá |
| Guamote | 45,153 | 1,216 | Guamote |
| Guano | 42,851 | 460 | Guano |
| Pallatanga | 11,544 | 377 | Pallatanga |
| Penipe | 6,739 | 370 | Penipe |
| Riobamba | 225,741 | 980 | Riobamba |

== Demographics ==
Ethnic groups as of the Ecuadorian census of 2010:

- Mestizo 58.4%
- Indigenous 38.0%
- White 2.2%
- Afro-Ecuadorian 1.1%
- Montubio 0.3%
- Other 0.1%

== See also ==
- Cantons of Ecuador
- Provinces of Ecuador
- Chimborazo volcano
- Sangay National Park
- Opportunitas aequa
