= Alausí Canton =

Alausí
- Canton
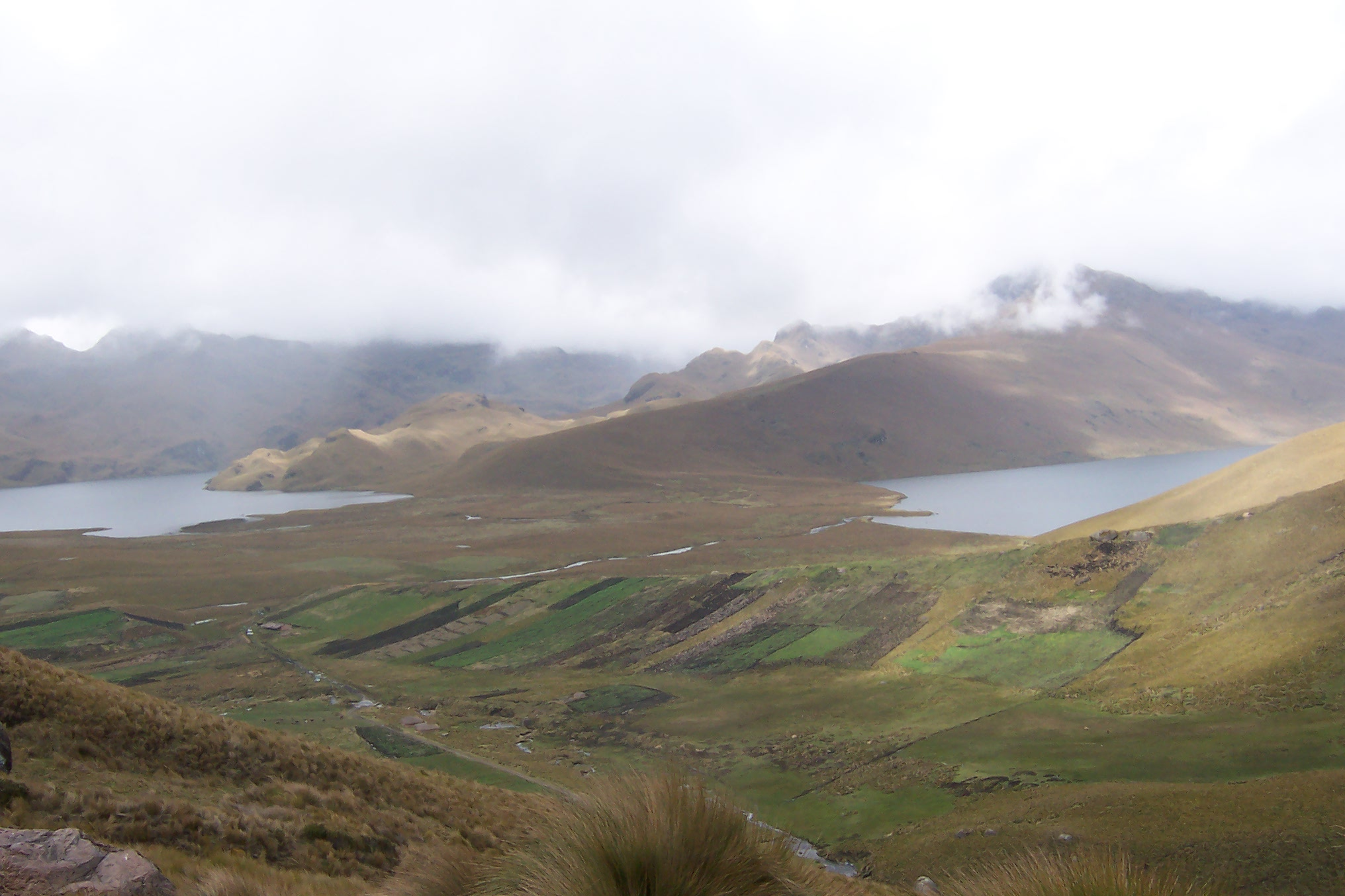
- Ozogoche lakes

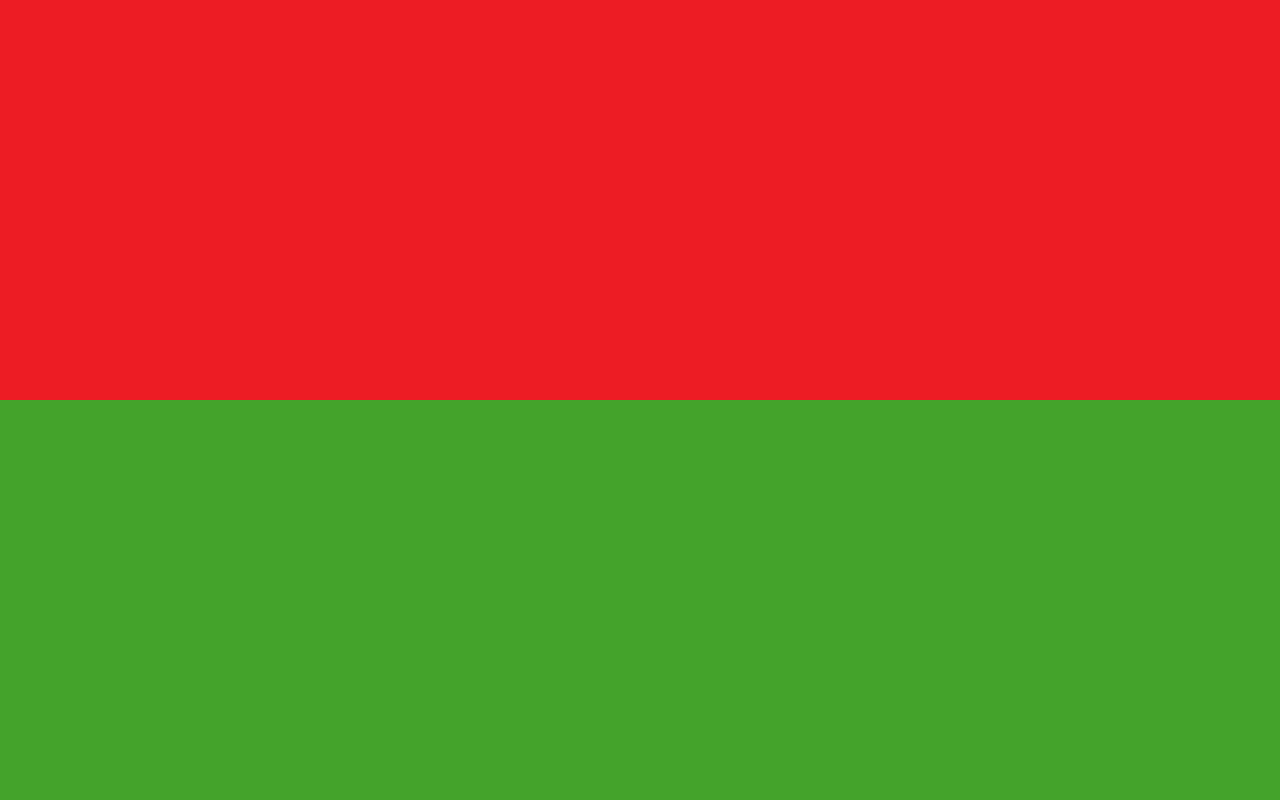
- Flag

- Location of Chimborazo Province in Ecuador.

- Alausí Canton in Chimborazo Province
- Coordinates: 2°12′S 78°51′W
- Country: Ecuador
- Province: Chimborazo Province
- Seat: Alausí

Government
  - Mayor: José Clemente Taday Lema

Area
  - Total: 1,288 km^{2} (497 sq mi)

Population (2022 census)
  - Total: 37,275
  - Density: 28.94/km^{2} (74.95/sq mi)
- Time zone: UTC-5 (ECT)
- Website: municipiodealausi.gov.ec

Alausí Canton is a canton in the Chimborazo Province in Ecuador. Its seat is Alausí. The canton is being promoted as a tourist region, and was named a Pueblo Mágico (magical town) by the Ecuadorian Ministry of Tourism (MINTUR) in 2019.

Alausi is situated at an average altitude of 2,340 meters (7,680 feet) above sea level. The lowest level in the canton is 1,225 meters (4,019 feet) above sea level, in the Huigra parish and the highest is 3,340 meters (10,960 feet) above sea level in Achupallas.

The total area of the canton is 1,288 km^{2} (497 sq mi). The average temperature is 14 to 15 °C (57 to 59 °F).

Alausí is located 97 km (60 mi) from Riobamba, in a small valley at the foot of Cerro Gampala, in the depression where the Chanchán River flows.

== Subdivision ==
The canton is divided into 10 parishes, one urban parish, Alausí, and nine rural parishes: Achupallas, Guasuntos, Multitud, Pistishi, Pumallacta, Tixán, Sibambe, Sevilla, Huigra.

Parish	Inhabitants (2001)
Total	42.823
Alausí (urban)	5.563
Rural area	37.260
Periphery	3.437
Alausí Parish	9.000
Achupallas Parish	10.327
Guasuntos Parish	2.687
Huigra Parish	2.698
Multitud Parish	2.334
Pistishi Parish	303
Pumallacta Parish	1.083
Sevilla Parish	845
Sibambe Parish	4.341
Tixán Parish	9.205

Saint Peter of Alausí is the capital of the Canton Alausí, and located in the western mountain range.

It was founded on June 29, 1534, by Sebastián de Benalcázar and is considered to have been the first settlement in the Royal Audience of Quito. Pirámide de la población del Cantón Alausí. During the existence of Quito State (1811-1812), Alausí was one of the eight cities that sent a representative to the Supreme Congress that was convened on October 11 1811 in the Royal Palace of Quito; obtaining the deputation the doctor José Antonio Pontón.

During this period the city and its surroundings were elevated to the category of a Province. While the urban center was elevated to the category of a town on November 16 of the same year.

The arrival of the railway on September 8, 1902 constituted a promising development for the urban, architectural and social development of Alausí. It is located 97 km south of Riobamba, in a small valley, at the foot of the Gampala hill in the depression that follows the course of the Chanchán river.

=== Geography ===
- It limits the north with the Nudo de Tío Cajas
- To the south with the Nudo del Azuay
- To the east with Macas and Sevilla de Oro,
- From the west it reaches the coastal plains in the province of Guayas

Among the main rivers are the Chanchán, which is born in the moors of Atapo. It is the main hydrographic agent of the hole of the same name, formed by Pomacacha and Guasuntos. The Chanchán river receives the waters of the Sibambe, Lauma, Blanco, Angas rivers; joining with the Chimbo, it forms the Yahuachi that joins the Guayas, to reach the Pacific Ocean.

=== Political division ===
Alausí is made up of 10 parishes: one urban and nine rural.

The urban one is Central Alausí and the rural ones are: Tixán, Sibambe, Huigra, Pistishi, Sneaky, Pulls, Seville, Pumallacta, and Crowd.

=== Demographics ===
The cantonal population is 64,059 inhabitants, of which 21,220 inhabitants exist in the urban capital of Alausí, and 42,839 live in the rural sector. It has a population density of 25 inhabitants per ^{2}.

The annual population growth rate for the period 1990-2001 was 0.8%. In the rural area of the canton, 13% of the population of Alausí is concentrated. Some significant parameters of the existing services in the canton are:

- Piped water inside the house: 23%
- Electric power 79.7%
- Telephone service 10.53%

In summary, the deficit of basic residential services reaches 82.06% of homes

== Tourist attractions ==
The historical center of the city, with its narrow cobbled streets, buildings that mix constructive and stylistic traditions of the Ecuadorian highlands and coast, together with its balconies with flowers and picturesque facades, allowed it to declare National Heritage and one of the centers of greatest tourist attraction in the province and the country. Cantonal header panoramic. Monument of San Pedro Ozogoche lake system. In the natural viewpoint of the Lluglli 'mess, the monumental sculpture (21 meters high) of Saint Peter, built in 2001 by Eddie Crespo.

It is also possible to visit the Eloy Alfaro Square, which features a sculpture of the character and four murals that describe various moments of the potter revolution.

In the park November 13 is the Mother Church and a monument to freedom.

Old locomotive or the new autoferros lead to the Devil's nose, a formation with a switchback railroad.

A section of the canton crosses the canton Inca path, the main communication channel of the Inca empire until before the Spanish conquest.

In Huigra, one of the parishes of the canton, there are some buildings from the early twentieth century such as the railway station, the General Management of the National Company of State Railways, the monument to Eloy Alfaro that also contains two effigies of the Hartman brothers and was made by the Ecuadorian sculptor Carlos Mayer in Italy in 1929, and some other valuable buildings that see the river pass through the center of this historic urban center.

In the Grotto of the Virgin of Lourdes of the Immaculate Conception, there is one of the two images of the virgin sculpted in marble, the other is in Turin (Italy).

The Ozogoche lake system is made up of more than 30 lagoons. The largest are those of Magtayan, with an area of 2.19 km^{2} and Ozogoche or Cubillina with 5.25 km^{2}, located approximately at 3,800 meters above sea level, constituting another important natural attraction. Edited by Paul Vaquilema.

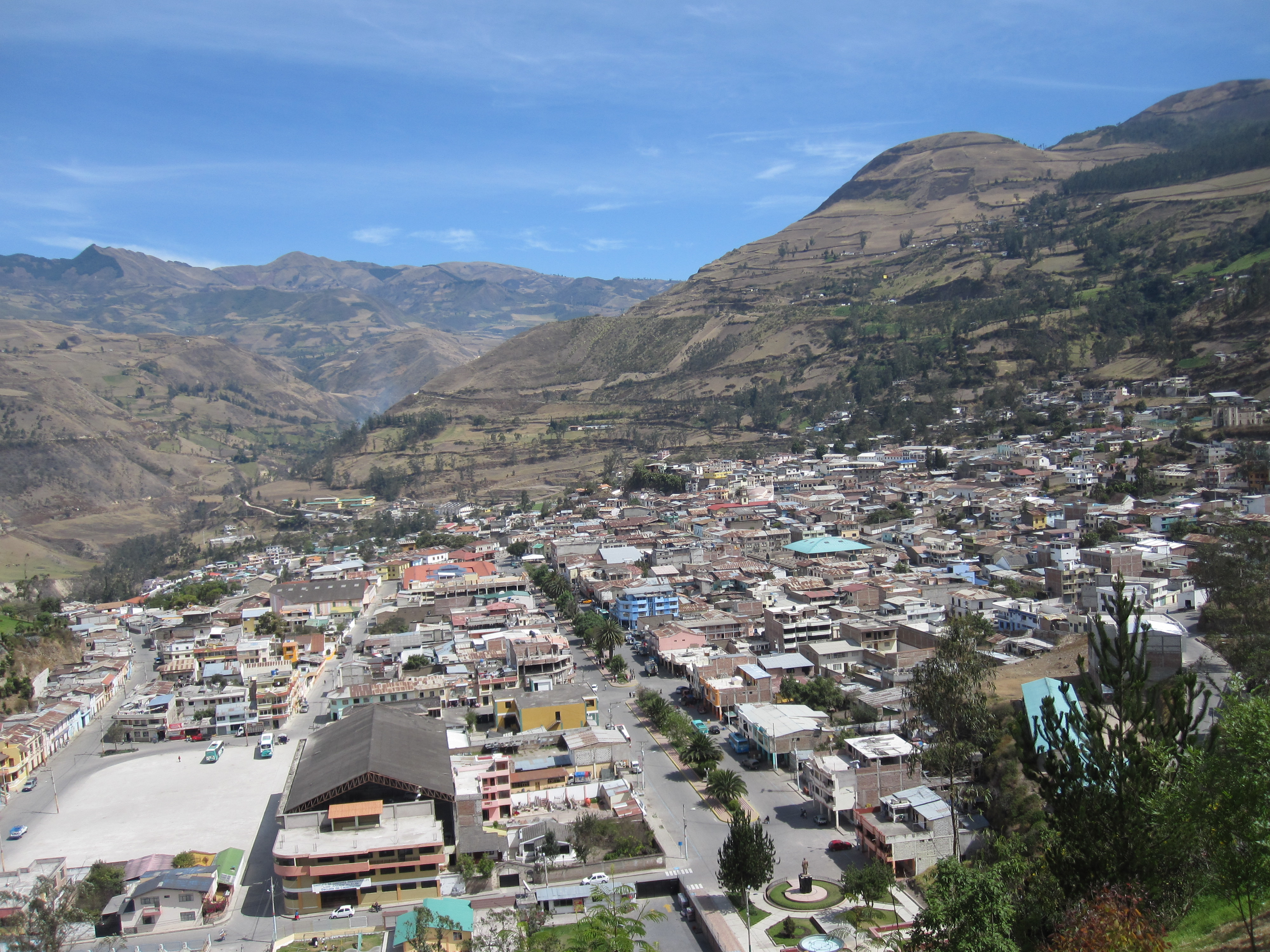
Alausi

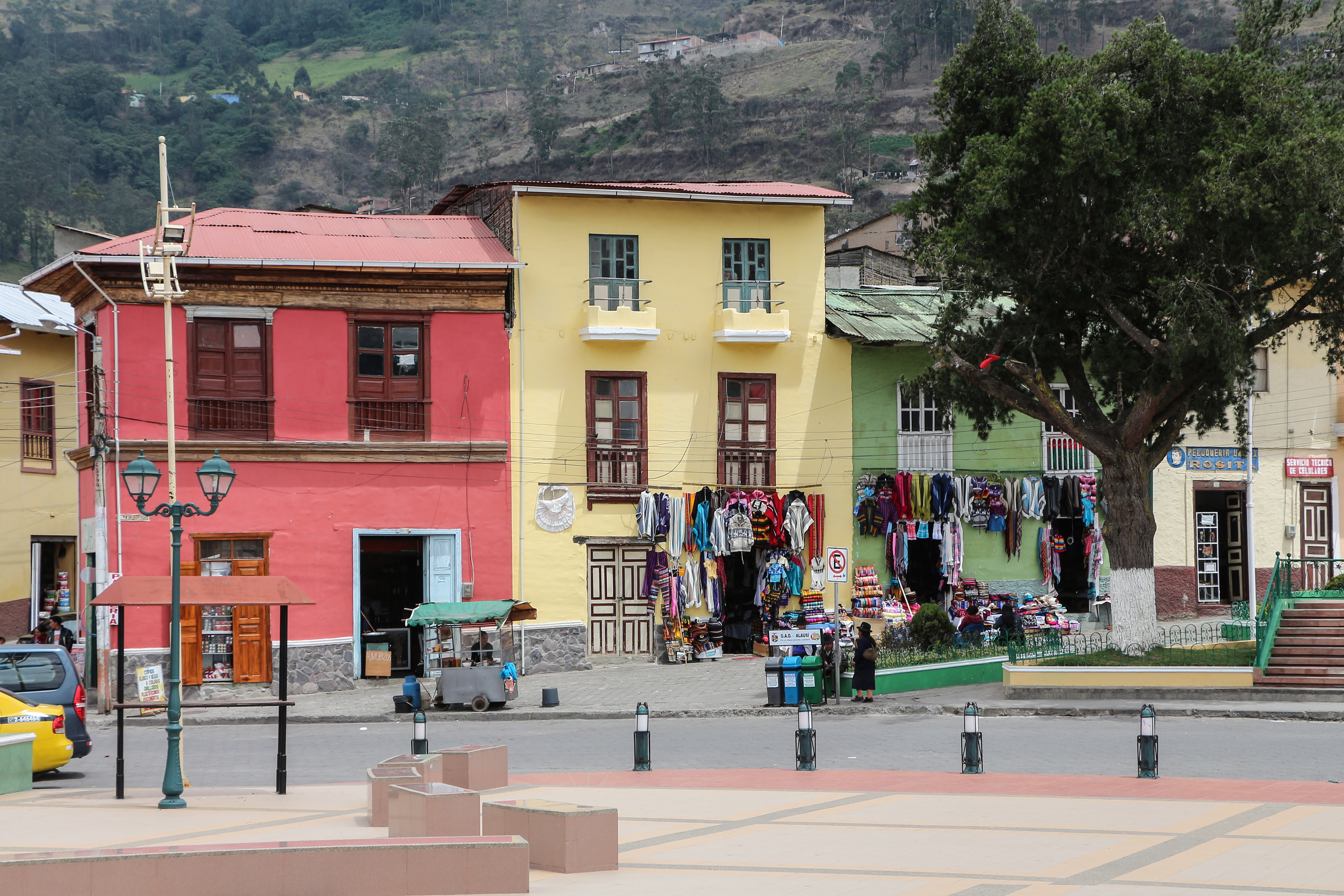
Buildings in Alausí

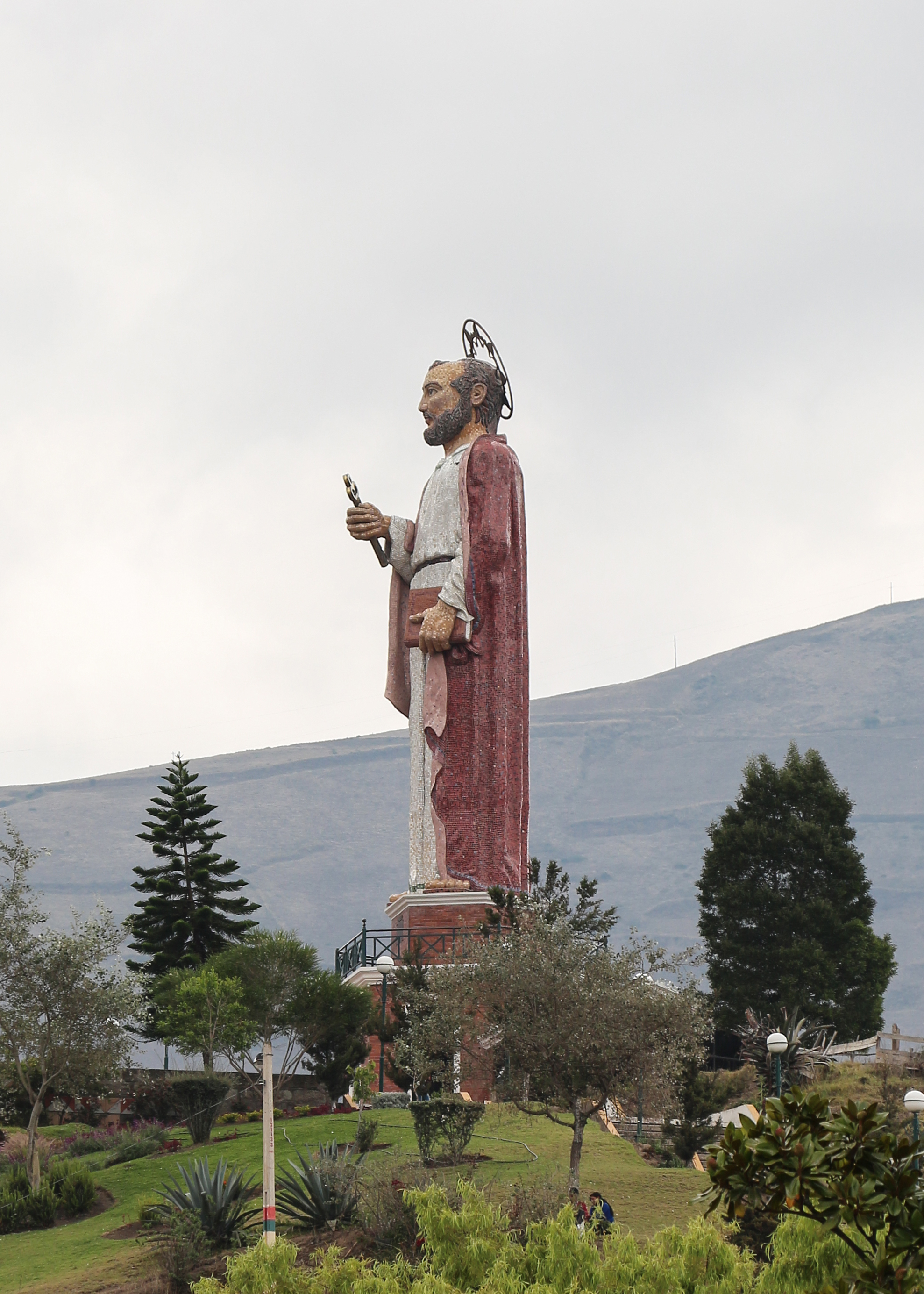
San Pedro Statue

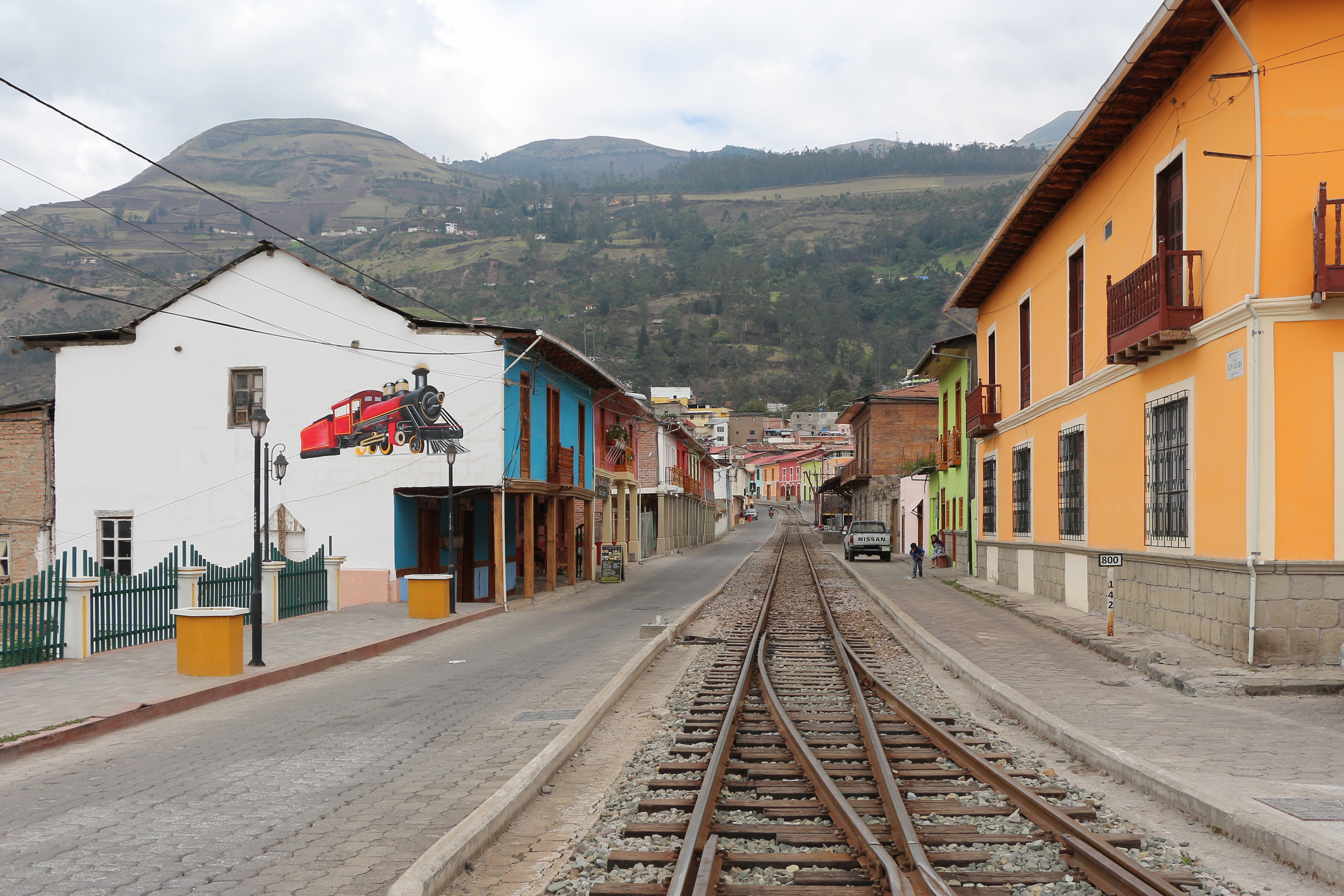
Train Station of Alausi

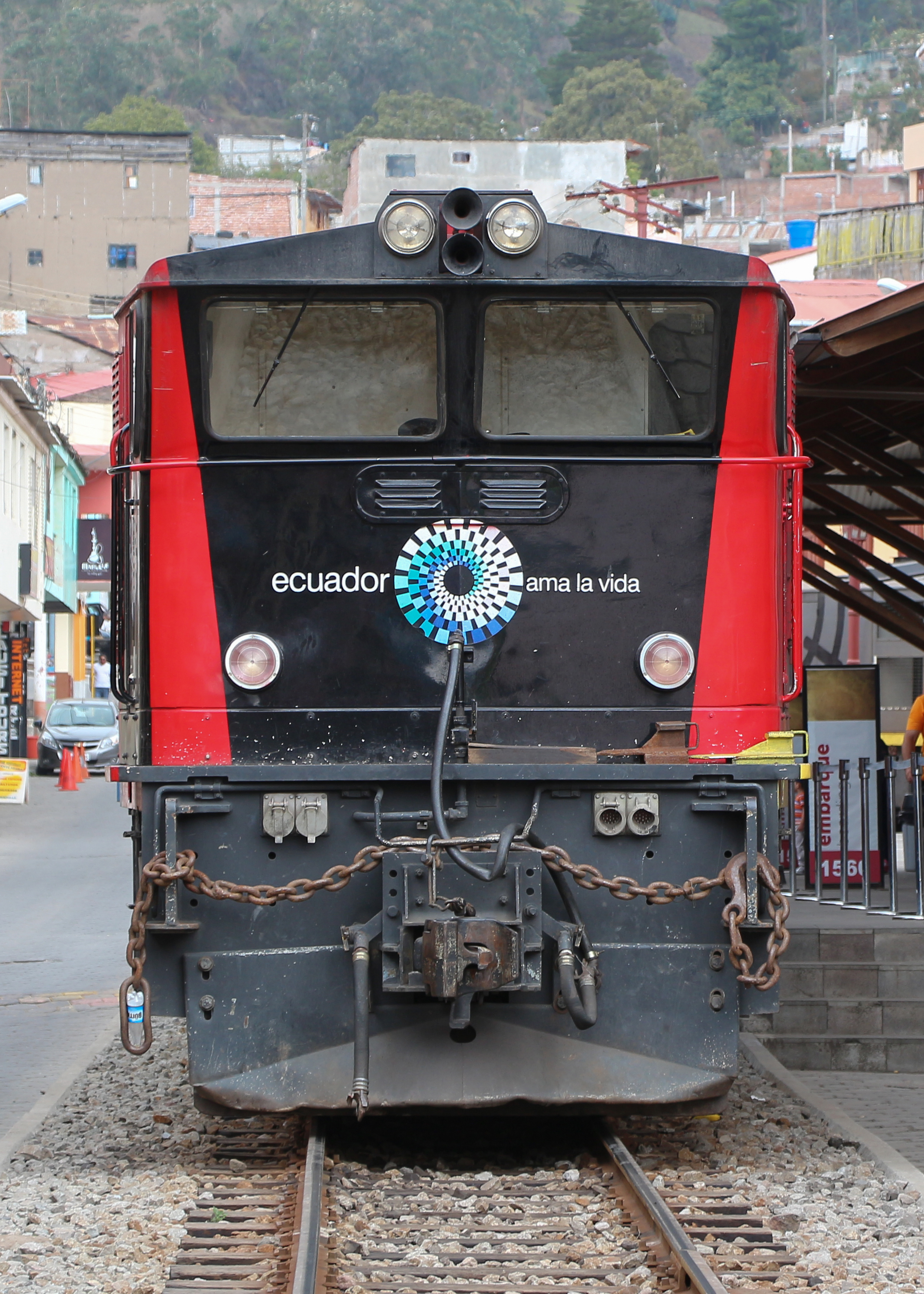
Train in Alausi

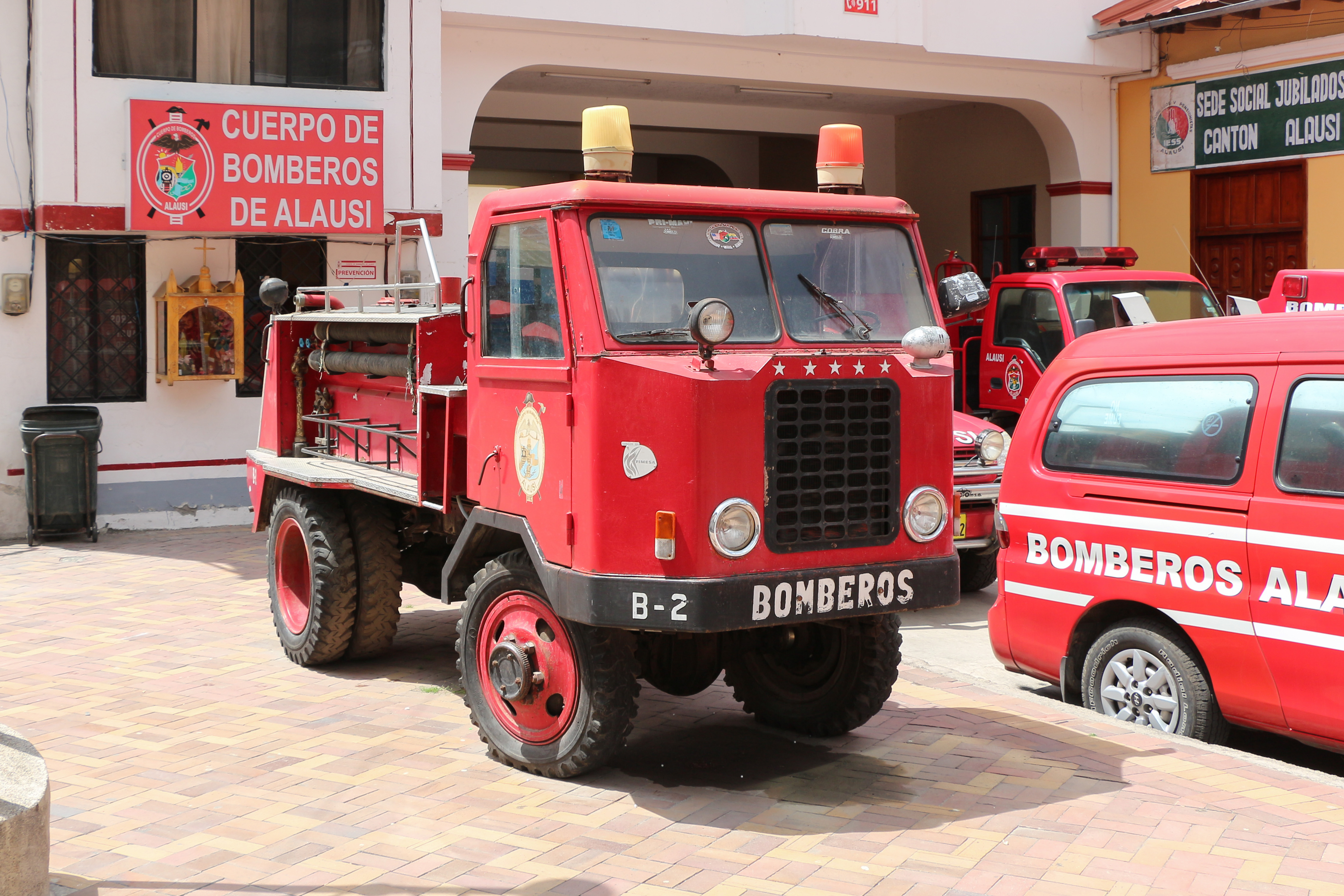
Fire Engine in Alausi

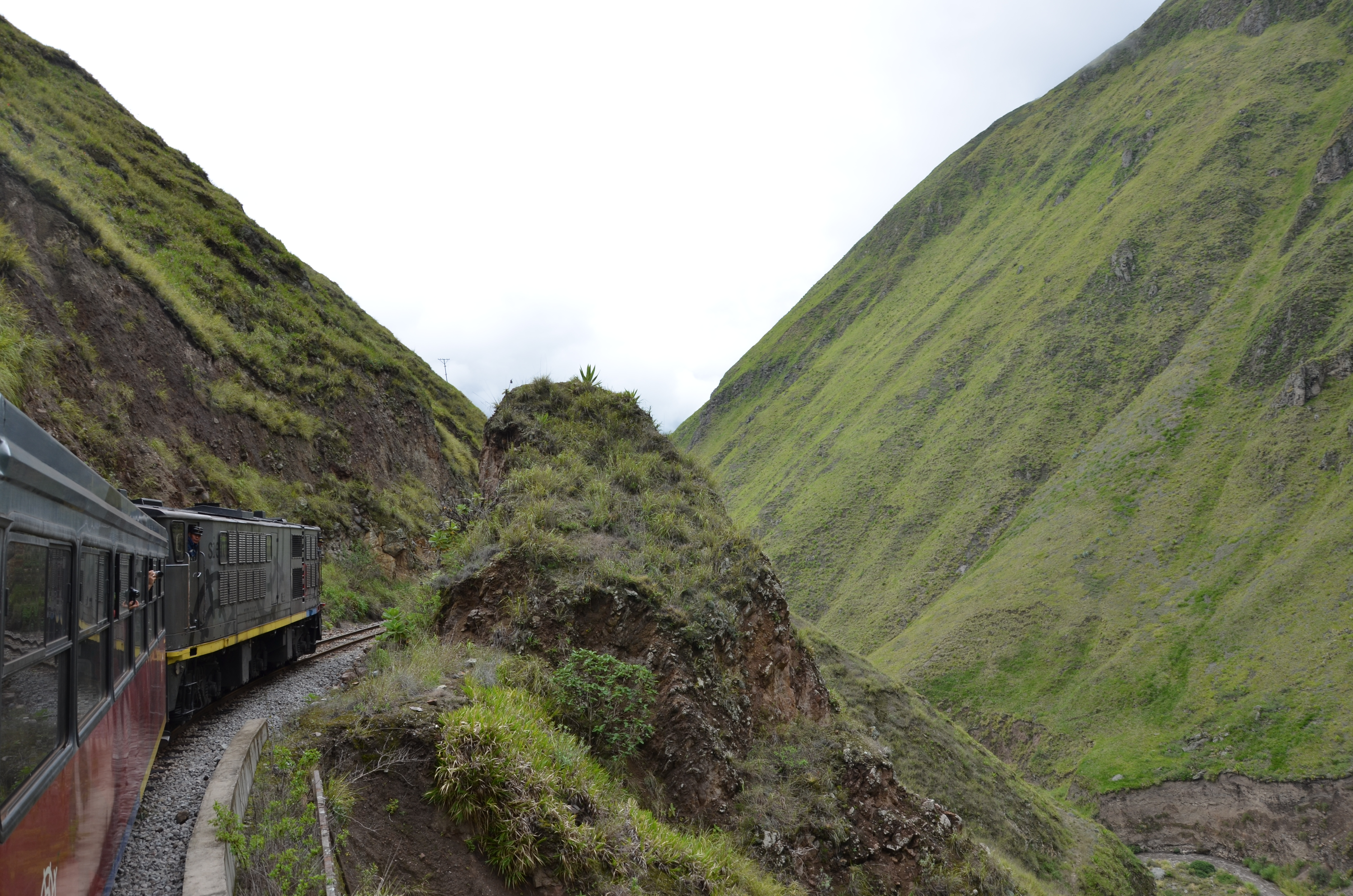
Alausí - Tren Nariz del Diablo

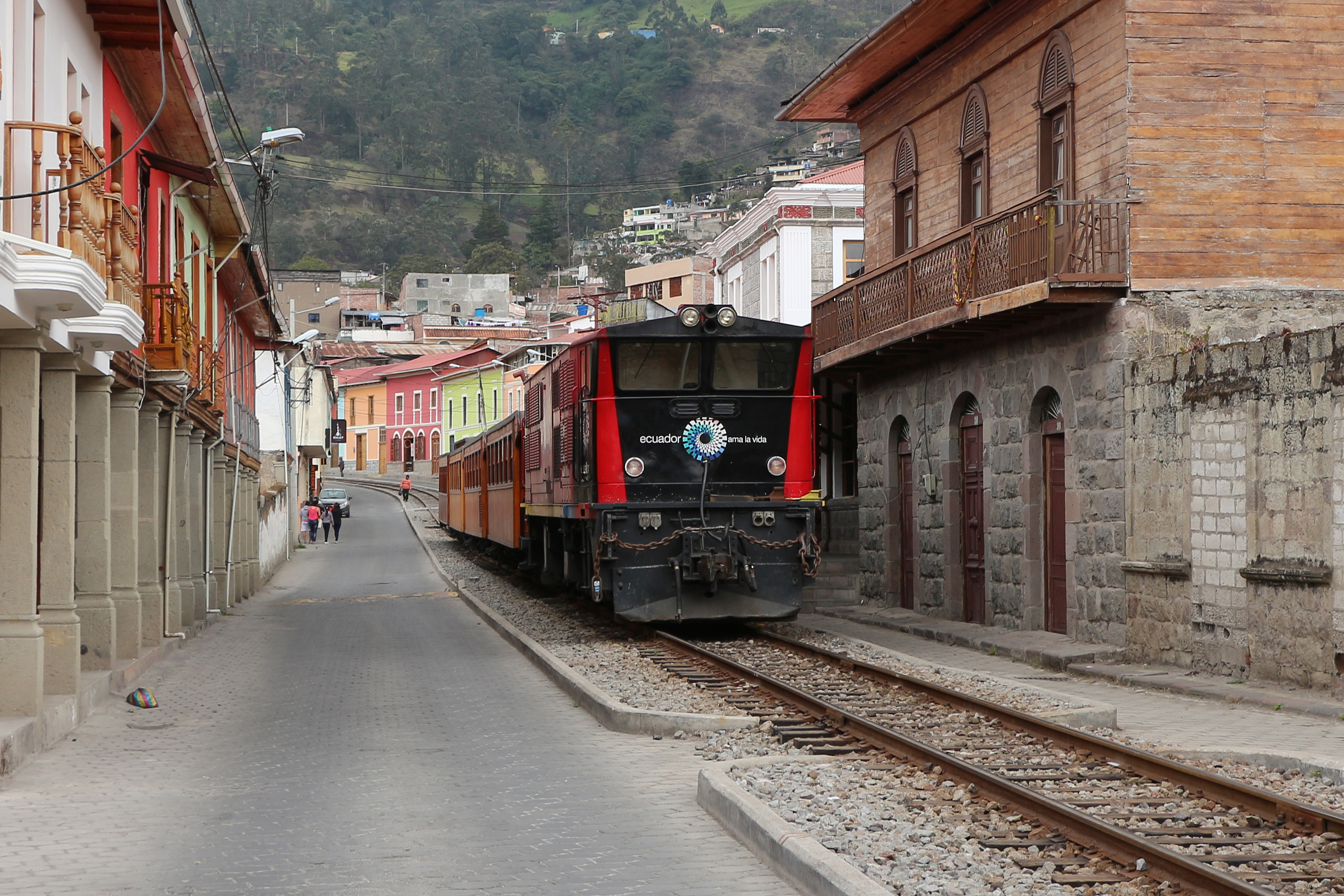
Train Station of Alausi
