= Sibambe =

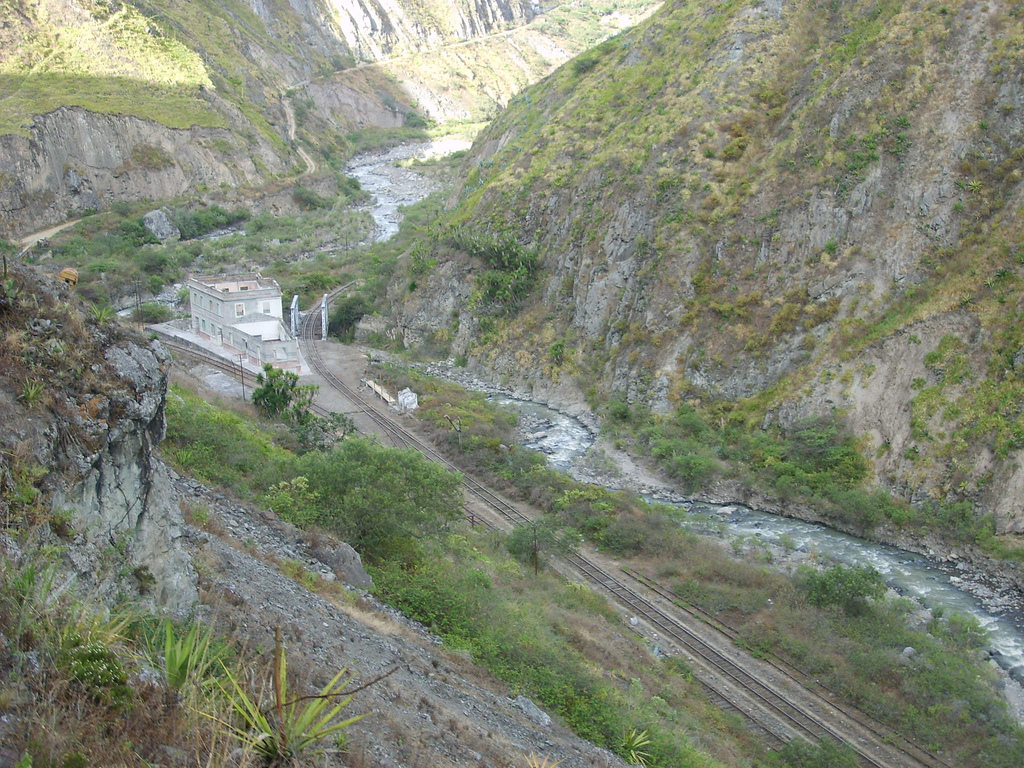
- Railway Station in Sibambe

- Location within Ecuador
- Coordinates: 2°12′0″S 78°53′0″W
- Country: Ecuador
- Province: Chimborazo Province
- Canton: Alausí Canton

Sibambe is a small town in the Chimborazo province of Ecuador. It is located near the base of the "Devil's Nose" promontory and the end point for tourist trains from Riobamba and Alausi that negotiate the switchbacks of the Devil's Nose.

Preceding station	Empresa de Ferrocarriles Ecuatorianos	Following station
Nariz del Diablo towards Alausí	Nariz del Diablo train	Terminus
	Suspended services	
Nariz del Diablo towards San Lorenzo	Main line	Huigra towards Durán
Nariz del Diablo towards San Lorenzo	Cuenca branch	Chunchi towards Cuenca

== Sources ==
- Satellite photo and location

== See also ==
- Empresa de Ferrocarriles Ecuatorianos
