= Empresa de Ferrocarriles Ecuatorianos =

Railway line in Ecuador

Railways in Ecuador: Routes with passenger traffic Routes in usable state Unusable or dismantled routes

The Ferrocarriles del Ecuador Empresa Pública (Ecuadorian Railways Company) is the national railway of Ecuador. The railway system was devised to connect the Pacific coast with the Andean highlands. After many decades of service the railway was severely damaged by heavy rainfall during the El Niño in 1997 and 1998 and from general neglect as the Pan-American Highway siphoned off passengers.

In 2008 the president Rafael Correa named the railroad a "national cultural patrimony" and indicated that it would be restored. The government of Ecuador started to rehabilitate the railway and service was restored between Guayaquil and Quito by 2013.

An extensive range of services, primarily for leisure travellers, were operated by steam and diesel-electric locomotive-hauled trains and by autoferros (bus bodies mounted on rail chassis).

All railway services ceased in 2020 and by presidential decree the liquidation of the railway company commenced.

As of 2024, local tourist-oriented routes have reopened in Imbabura province and Chimborazo province.

== Construction ==
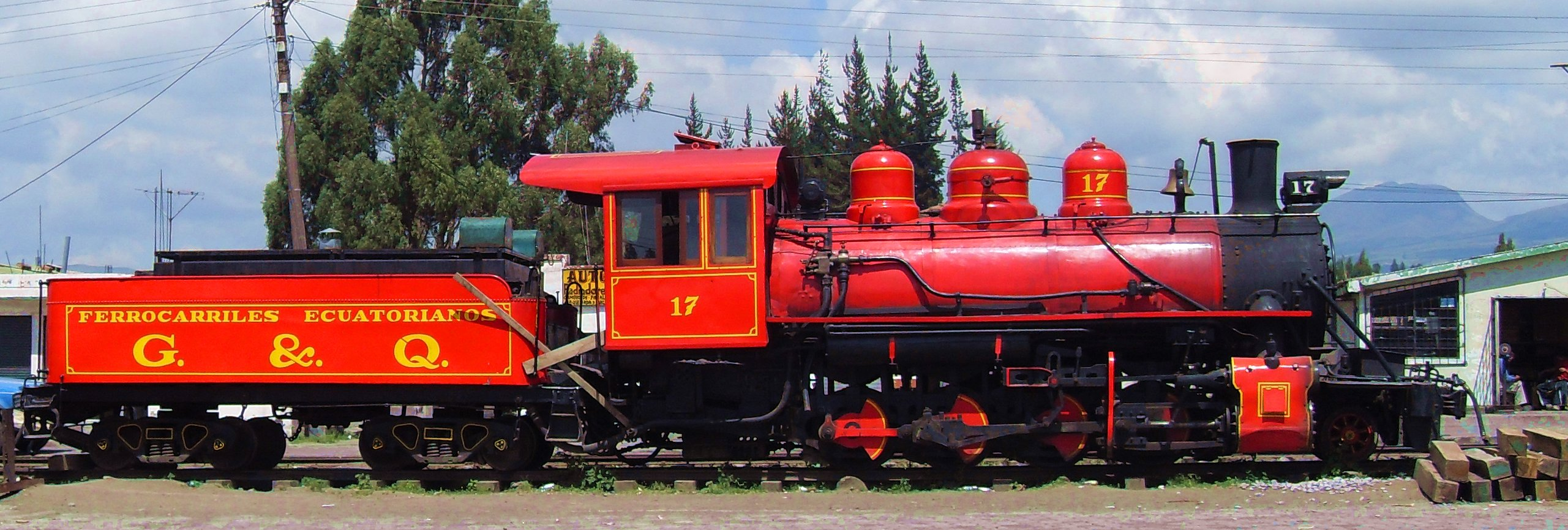
Baldwin 2-8-0 of the G&Q Line

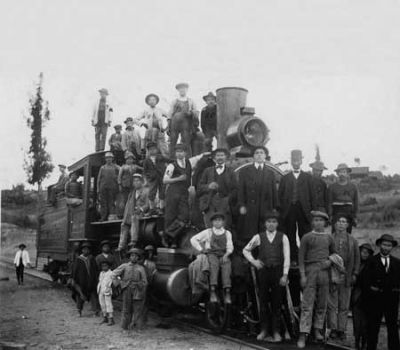
1908, during the construction

The project of an Ecuadorian railway was started by President Gabriel García Moreno in 1861. The first section was opened between Yaguachi and Milagro in 1873, and Bucay was reached by 1888.

The push into the Andes was made under President Eloy Alfaro, who planned to link Quito in the highlands to Guayaquil on the coast of Ecuador. For advice, Alfaro turned to Col. William Findlay Shunk, a North American engineer who designed the New York El, and who had mapped a route of the InterContinental Railway through Ecuador, Colombia, and Panama in 1892. The InterContinental Railway was never built. However, in 1897, Eloy Alfaro signed a contract with Archer Harman and a team of investors for the newly created New Jersey corporation, the Guayaquil and Quito Railway Company, or the G&Q, to rehabilitate and complete the railroad from Guayaquil to Quito. Archer Harman and his brother, Major John A. Harman (Col. Shunk's son-in-law), were from Staunton, Virginia. Together, Archer (G&Q financier) and John (G&Q Chief Engineer) helped Alfaro to connect disparate parts of Ecuador.

The G&Q line was built between 1897 and 1908, when the line reached Quito amid celebrations that lasted for days, and shortened the often lengthy trip from Quito to Guayaquil to two days.

The G&Q Railway evolved into the Southern Division (División Sur) of Empresa de Ferrocarriles Ecuatorianos.

The northern line, continuing from Quito to San Lorenzo, was completed in 1957.

A branch from the G&Q at Sibambe to Cuenca was completed in 1965.

== Other public former railways ==
Ferrocarril Ambato - Cururay. Commenced from Ambato (on the G&Q Southern Division), reached Pelileo (35 km) and was intended to continue to Baños de Agua Santa, located on the banks of the Pastaza River then intended to extend until it crossed the Arajuno River and reached a navigable point on the Curaray, a total length of 117 km. Construction commenced in 1912 and the company ceased operating in February 1936.

Ferrocarril de Bahia a Chone. Commenced at Bahia de Caraquez and ran to Chone (79 km). Construction commenced in 1909 and was completed in 1912. The line ceased 'in the mid 1960s'.

Ferrocarril Central de Ecuador. Commenced at Manta and ran to Santa Ana. Construction commenced in 1911 and was completed in 1913. Services ceased in 1946.

Ferrocarril de Guayacil a Salinas. Commenced at Guyaquil and ran to Salinas (152 km). Construction was completed in 1936. Services ceased in 1954.

Ferrocarril de el Oro. Commenced at Puerto Bolivar and ran to Piedras (75 km) with Loja as the intended terminus. The line had two branches from Machala (6 km from Puerto Bolivar), one to Pasaje with Cuenca as the intended terminus, and one to La Iberia with Duran as the intended terminus. Construction commenced around 1893. Services ceased for certain by 1971, probably earlier in reality.

== Operation ==
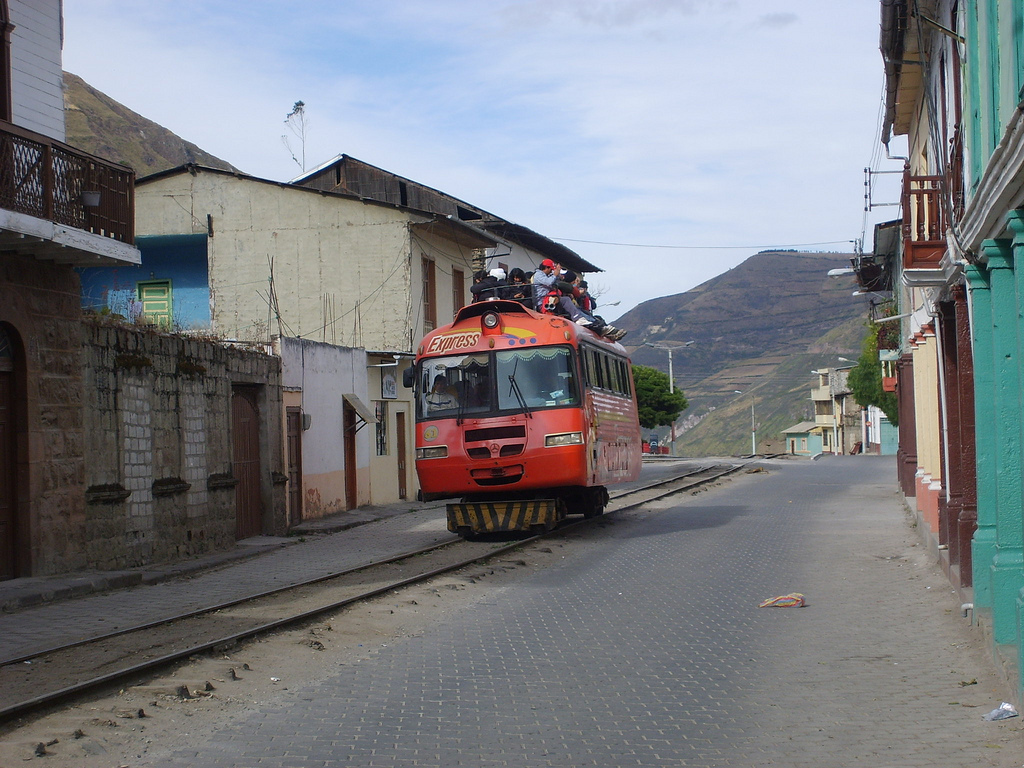
Tourist train, in Alausí, to the "Nariz del Diablo", 2008

The railway represents the largest infrastructure of the country a total length of 965.5 kilometres (600 mi). Its single track uses a gauge of 3 ft 6 in (1,067 mm). The 446.7 kilometres (277.6 mi) Southern Division (Division Sur) starts at the harbour of Guayaquil with a track to Duran and then heads east into the Andean mountains where a more than 2.5 kilometres (8,200 ft) difference in altitude has to be overcome to reach Riobamba at 2,754 metres (9,035 ft). A major gain in altitude is made at the Devil's Nose (Nariz del Diablo) where the train shunts back and forth along the rocky promontory. From Riobamba the train heads north passing its highest point at Urbina an altitude of 3,609 metres (11,841 ft) to reach Quito at an altitude of 2,850 metres (9,350 ft).

The 373.4 kilometres (232.0 mi) Northern Division (Division Norte) was completed in 1957. It connects Quito to the northern sea port of San Lorenzo over Ibarra, Primer Paso and Cachavi.

The Cuenca line branches off near Sibambe and represents the 145.4 kilometres (90.3 mi) Subdivision Sur. It was constructed between 1915 and 1965.

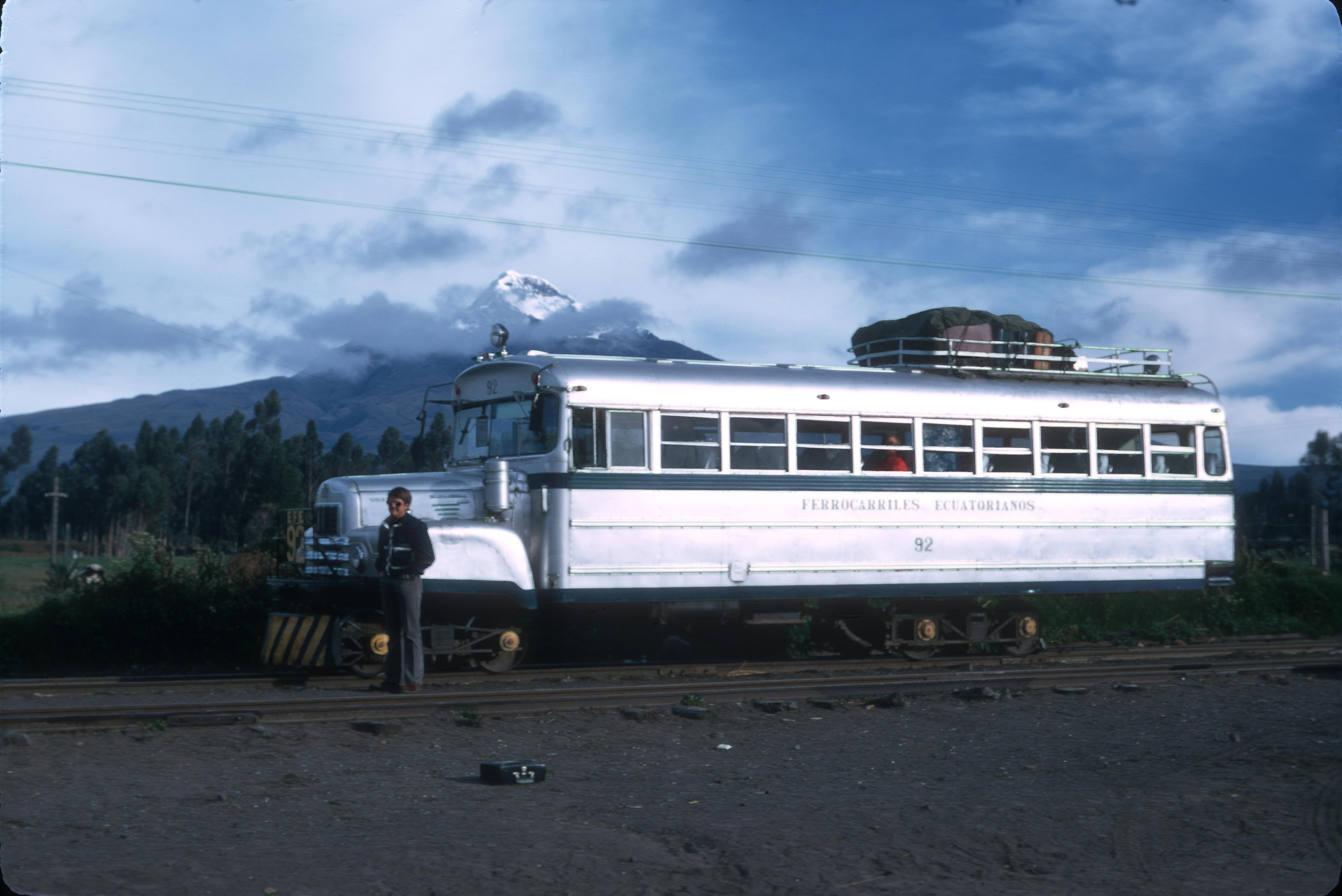
A converted bus serving as a self-propelled passenger car

The railway used to be of general economic significance for many decades. Initially steam engines were obtained from the Baldwin Locomotive Works. The last set of 2-8-0 steam engines were obtained in 1953. In 1957 five Alstom diesel-electric locomotives were delivered for the San Lorenzo line, Ten Alco diesel-electric locomotives were delivered in 1968 and nine GEC-Alstom locomotives were delivered in 1992. Few steam and diesel locomotives were in an operational mode, the exact numbers subject to conflicting information. There were also a number of railbuses (autoferros) in operation.

At the point of liquidation the railway had 12 diesel-electric locomotives, 7 steam locomotives and 11 autoferro, not all operational.

== Demise ==
Since the 1997/98 disruptions no continuous service has been conducted and further degradation had made the railway almost useless. Road services have taken over passenger and freight transportation in Ecuador. At the 2008 centennial only 10 percent of the railway was open only tourist trains remain active.

== Restoration ==
In 2008 the president Rafael Correa named the railroad a "national cultural patrimony" and indicated that it would be restored. The EFE was transformed in a public corporation: Ferrocarriles del Ecuador Empresa Publica (FEEP). FEEP publicised details of the restoration work in a series of publications 'Guardavia', commencing with issue 1 in May 2010 and concluding with issue 11 in December 2014.

The first section of line to be inaugurated was that between Quito (Chimbacalle) and Latacunga on 30 December 2008.

Following this a short section (3.5 km) of the former Sibambe to Cuenca line, that between El Tambo and Coyoctor / Baños del Inca was inaugurated on 24 April 2009.

The line from the coast at Duran (near Guayaquil) to Yaguachi was inaugurated on 29 June 2010.

Two sections of line were inaugurated in 2011. The section between Alausí and Sibambe which includes the switchback at the Devil's Nose was inaugurated on 16 February and that between Ibarra and Salinas on 13 December.

The section from Colta via Riobamba to Urbina was inaugurated on 3 October 2012.

The first phase of the rehabilitation project, the 271 km between Quito and Guamote, was inaugurated on December 27 and 28, 2012.

The second phase of the rehabilitation project, the 181 km between Guamote and Duran, was inaugurated on January 28 and 29, 2013. Thus by 2013 the entire Guayaquil/Duran - Quito railway was restored and open to the public.

The section of line between Ibarra and Otavalo was inaugurated in 2014.

== Route information ==
=== Southern Division (Division Sur) ===
Guayaquil <> Quito; 1897-1908; 446.7 km (277.6 mi)

Location	Date reached	Date restored	Notes	Co-ordinates	Other comments
Guayaquil	n/a	n/a	Opposite bank of river to railway terminus		
Durán a	1888	n/a	Original terminus	2.169854°S 79.852652°W	
Durán b	1887	2010	Workshops and terminus in recent years	2.165862°S 79.847311°W	
Yaguachi	1873-1875	2010			
Milagro	1873-1875	2013			
Bucay	1888	2013	Workshops	2.201622°S 79.136402°W	
Sibambe	1902	2011	Devil's Nose 'zig-zag', junction for Cuenca	2.243087°S 78.877978°W	
Alausí	1902	2011			
Riobamba	1905	2012	Workshops	1.667083°S 78.665759°W (workshops) 1.669850°S 78.653688°W (station)	
Urbina	1906	2012	highest point ( 1°30′01″S 78°43′59″W )		
Ambato	1907	2012			Original station (1905) built in what is now Av. 12 de Octubre, where the Central Market now occupies the old station grounds. Current station (2012) located in Ingahurco next to the interprovincial bus terminal.
Latacunga	1907	2008			
Machachi	1907	2008			
Quito	1908	2008	Workshops	0.247188°S 78.516645°W (workshops) 0.238321°S 78.515425°W (station)	The line was officially opened on President Alfaro's birthday, June 25, 1908

=== Northern Division (Division Norte) ===
Quito <> San Lorenzo; > 1957; 373.4 km (232.0 mi)

Location	Date reached	Date restored	Notes	Co-ordinates	Other comments
Quito		n/a	construction commenced 1916	0.238321°S 78.515425°W (station)	
Cayambe	1928	n/a			
Otavalo	1928	2014		0.224431°N 78.260975°W	Service suspended between Otavalo and San Roque before FEEP liquidation.
San Roque	1928	2014		0.300173°N 78.231108°W	
Ibarra	1929	2011	Workshops and museum	0.345756°N 78.124222°W (workshops) 0.347767°N 78.121563°W (station)	
Salinas	1945	2011		0.493915°N 78.132427°W	Tourist service between Ibarra and Salinas until FEEP liquidation.
Primera Paso		n/a		0.573630°N 78.126641°W	Tourist service between Ibarra and Primera Paso until early 2000s (at least 2005). Thomas Cook International Timetable for 2003 shows a service.
Lita		n/a		0.875224°N 78.453689°W	
Alto Tambo		n/a		0.912155°N 78.547216°W	An unofficial 'jeep-train' operates north from here (towards San Lorenzo) to Venturas (location km318).
El Progresso		n/a			A service operated between El Progresso and San Lorenzo until around 2014. Thomas Cook International Timetable for 2010 shows a service.
Cachavi		n/a	San Javier de Cachavi	1.043018°N 78.767034°W	
San Lorenzo	1957	n/a	Workshops	1.286165°N 78.834634°W (station) 1.288495°N 78.839797°W (workshops)	

=== Sibambe - Cuenca ===
Sibambe <> Cuenca: > 1965: 145.4 km

Location	Date reached	Date restored	Notes	Co-ordinates
Sibambe			junction with Duran - Quito line	2.243087°S 78.877978°W
Chunchi	1921			
Tipococha	1927			
El Tambo	1930	2009		2.512517°S 78.924623°W
Coyoctor		2009	Baños del Inca	2.525936°S 78.914251°W
Biblian	1945			
Azogues	1948			2.736838°S 78.852143°W
Cuenca	1965			2.915928°S 78.994282°W

Comprehensive details of the lines, their stations and distances have been compiled and published by Jim Fergusson and have now been made available through The Branch Line Society in the United Kingdom.

== Services prior to closure ==
A number of leisure orientated services operated, including from Quito to Latacunga via Cotopaxi National Park, between Alausi and Sibambe (Devil's Nose / Nariz del Diablo), between El Tambo and Baños del Inca, between Duran and Yaguachi and between Ibarra and Salinas. A premium service 'Tren Crucero' operated the whole length of the Southern Division from Duran to Quito.

== Closure and liquidation ==
Due to the impacts of the coronavirus pandemic upon the national economy, all trains were suspended in March 2020.

"All trains have been cancelled from March 17, 2020 on until further notice." Source: Volta o Trem 24-2 via Friends of Latin American Railways

Subsequent to this the company entered liquidation.

"Through Executive Decree No. 1057 of May 19, 2020, amended through executive decreess No. 1096 of July 17, 2020, No. 1123 of August 6, 2020, No. 1243 of February 2021 and No. 1288 of April 13, 2021, the Constitutional President of the Republic, ordered the extinction of Railways of Ecuador, Public Company-FEEP" [translated from original without amendment: extinction = liquidation].

The official liquidator's progress report provides information on the condition of the line (operational, non-operational, abandoned) at the time of liquidation.

== Transfer and suggested reopening ==
On 5 January 2022 the railway assets were transferred to the Ecuadorian State.

Today Minister @MarceloHCabrera signed the transfer of the National Railway Infrastructure to @ObrasPublicasEc with which this patrimonial asset passes into the hands of the Ecuadorian State and marks a new stage.

@MarceloHCabrera highlighted that this system will contribute to tourism, passenger transport and sustainable mobility since there is the possibility of implementing electric trains.

After this signing, the legal and administrative processes will be carried out so that the railway system is concessioned through a Public-Private Alliance, which will allow repowering and rehabilitating the Ecuadorian train.

[translated from original without amendment]

As of 2024, local tourist-oriented routes have reopened in Imbabura province and Chimborazo province. As of 2026, two of the six routes are operating: the Devil's Nose route (Alausi-Sibambe) is listed as "running" on the official site while the Freedom Train (Spanish: Tren de la Libertad) from Ibarra to Salinas is listed as "partial".

== Proposals ==
There are plans to expand the services further to Colombia and Venezuela.

== Gallery ==
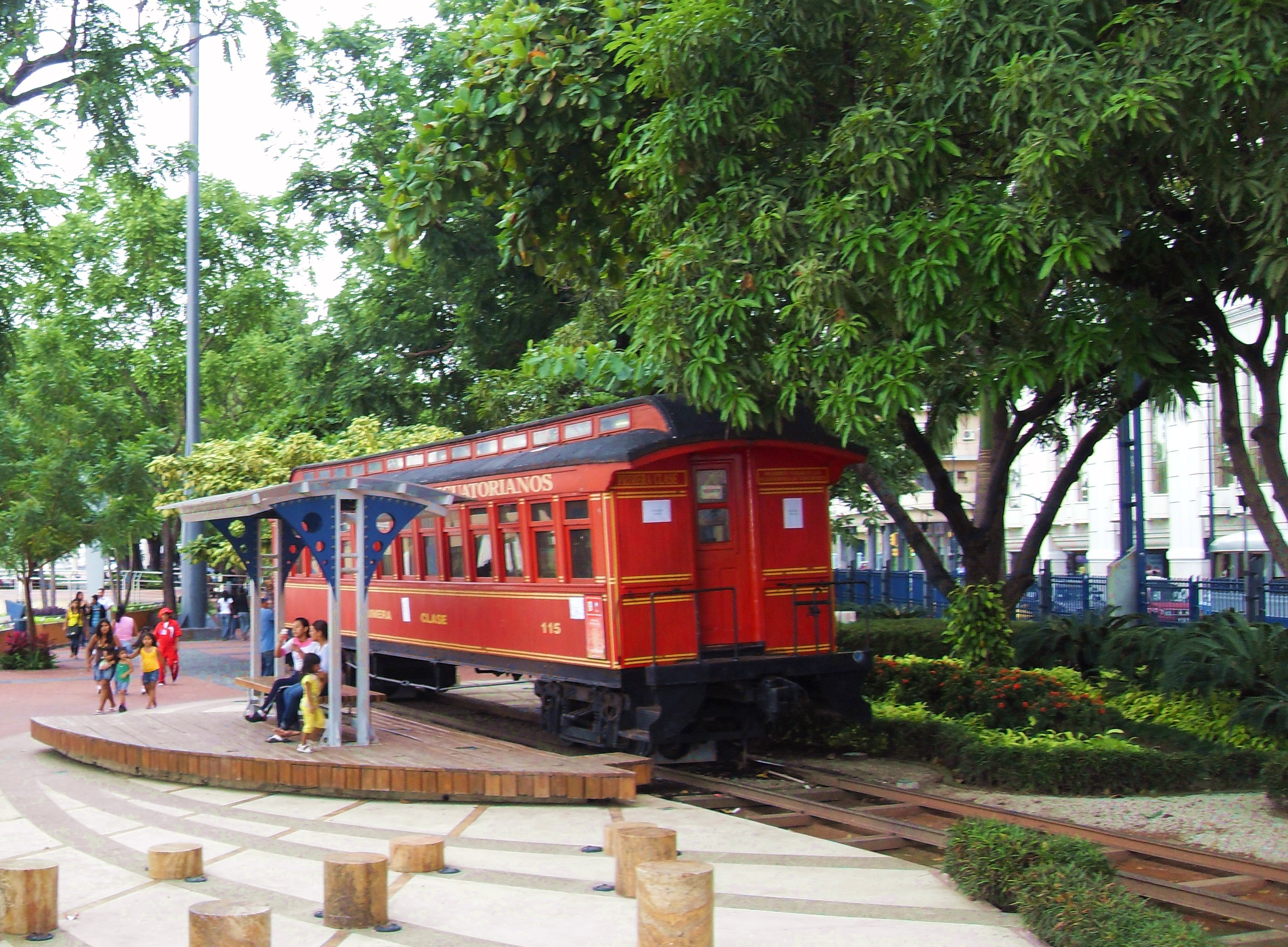
On the Malecón in Guayaquil

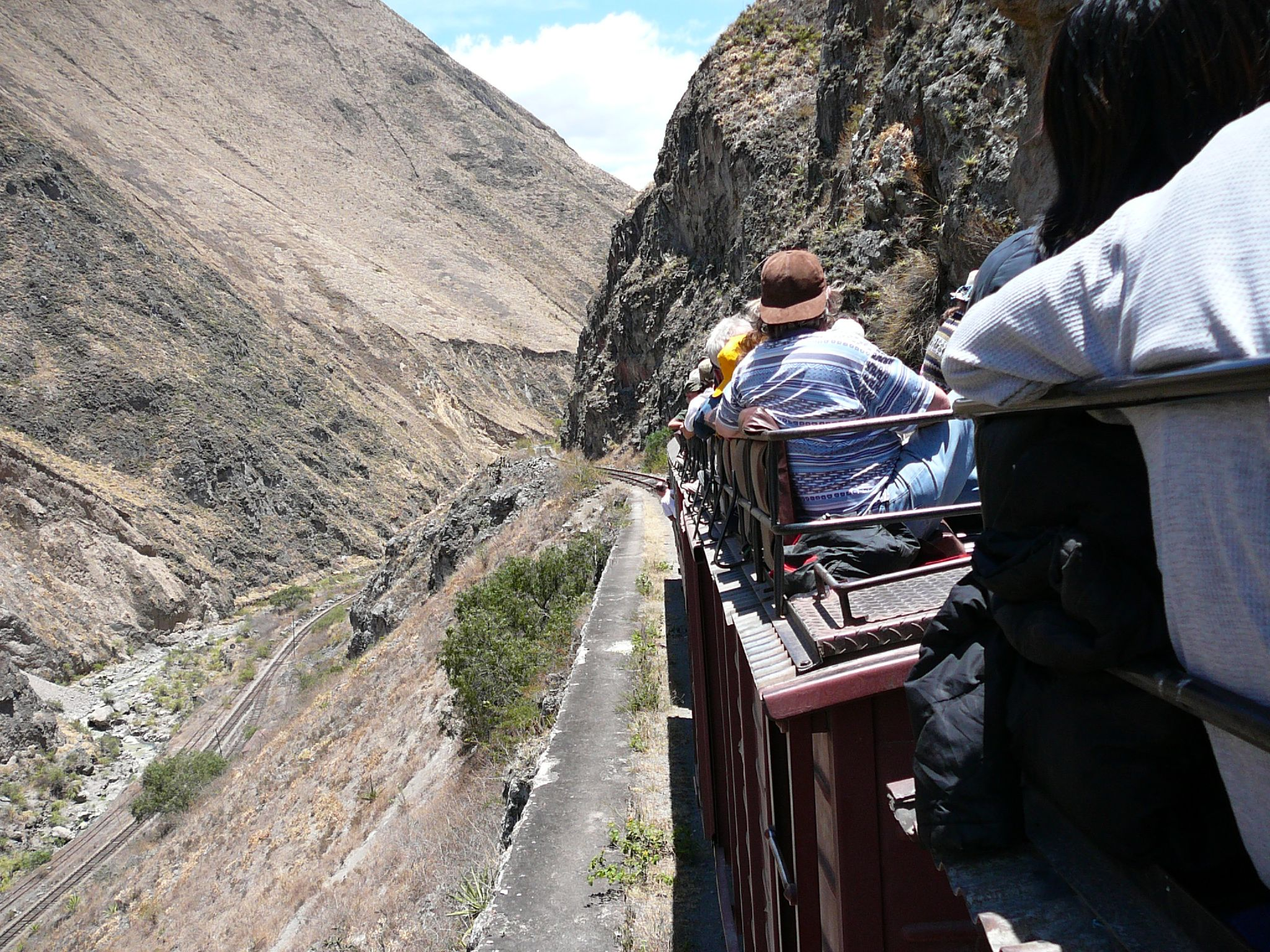
Switchback at the Devil's Nose

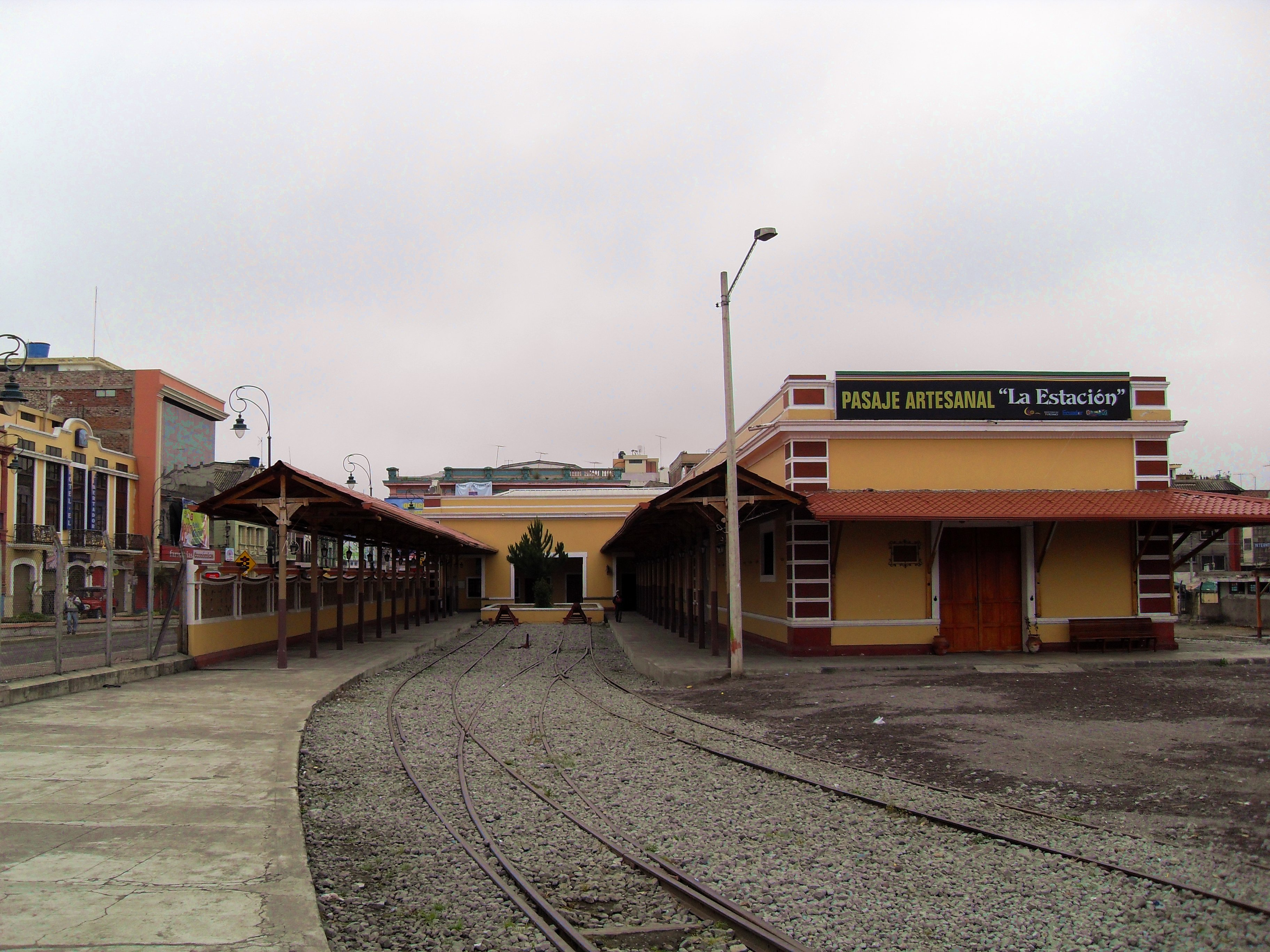
Riobamba railway station

== Books ==
- Elizabeth Harman Brainard and Katharine Robinson Brainard. Railroad in the Sky: the Guayaquil & Quito Railway in Ecuador 1897-1925. Publisher: Marion, MA: Atlantis Ltd. Partnership, 2003. ISBN 0-615-12411-9 ISBN 9780615124117
- Marcelo Meneses-Jurado: Tren al Sol. Train to the Sun. Journey on Board the Most Difficult Train in the World.
- Sandra Naranjo, Pabel Muñoz, Paola Carvajal, Richard Espinosa, Jorge Eduardo Carrera, Francisco Mosquera, Mayra Prado T. Construcción y Rehabilitación del Tren de Alfaro. Publisher: Directorio Ferrocarriles del Ecuador Empresa Pública, 2014. ISBN 978-9942-07-742-4

== See also ==
- Tren Crucero Ecuador
