= Mayra Montaño =

Ecuadorian radio hostess and politician (born 1955)

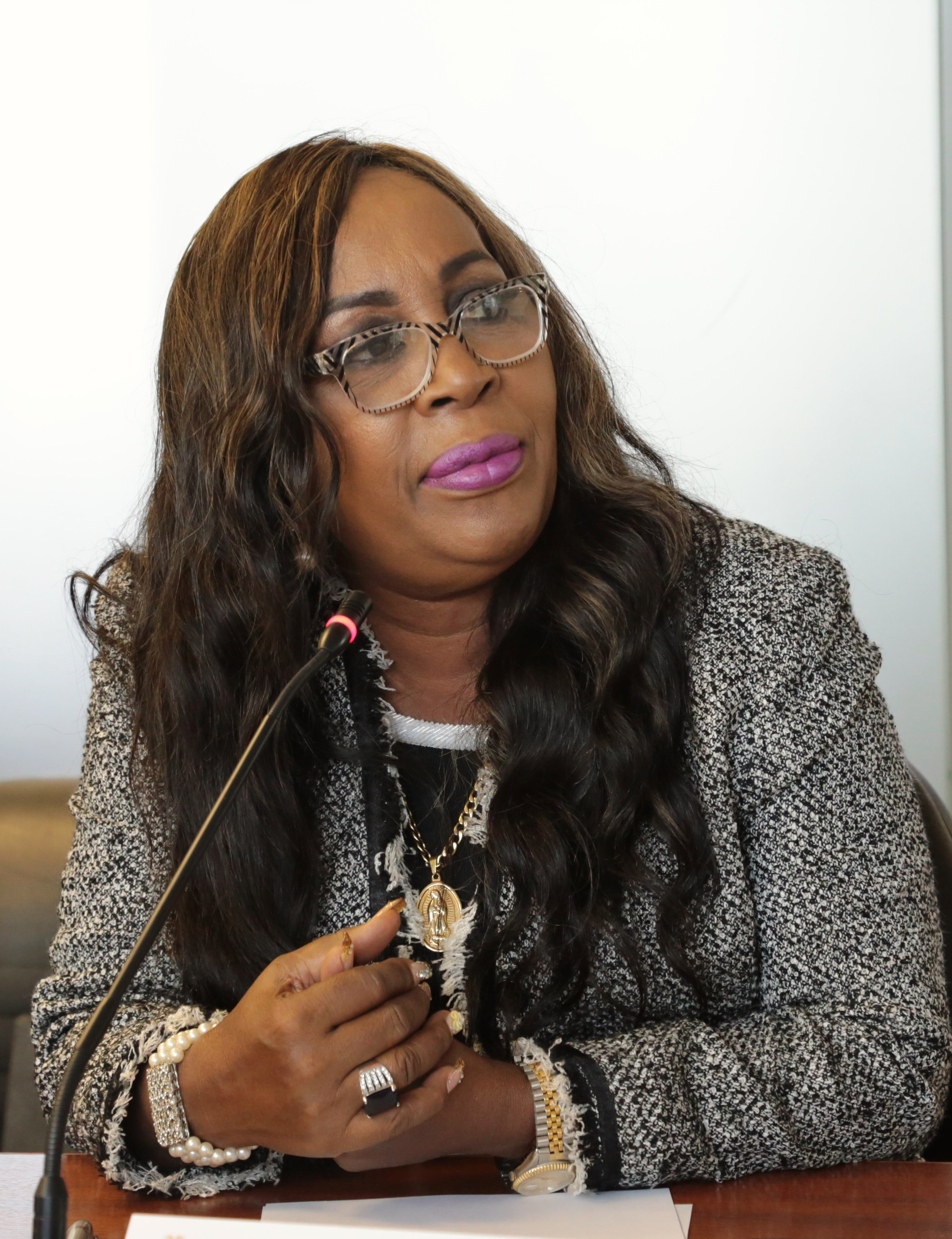
- Born: December 23, 1955 (age 70); San Lorenzo, Ecuador
- Other name: "La Bombón"
- Occupations: Presenter and politician
- Political party: Social Christian Party
- Children: two

Mayra Migdonia Montaño Guisamano aka La Bombón (born 23 December 1955) is an Ecuadorian radio hostess and politician. She was elected to Ecuador's national assembly before she became a Municipal Councilor of Guayaquil, representing Urban Constituency 1 for the Social Christian Party.

== Life ==
Montaño was born in San Lorenzo in 1955 in the province of Esmeraldas. At the age of 15, she moved to Guayaquil where she ventured into radio and then television. She was an announcer for Radio Canela who was known as "La Bombón". She was recruited for the program Divinas, on Canal Uno. She was one of six presenters raising issues that were of concern to women.

In 2013 she was an unsuccessful candidate for vice-prefecture for the Social Christian Party, with César Rohón.

She was chosen as one of the lead candidates by the Social Democratic party in 2016 for the February 2017 legislative elections. She was elected to be a national assembly member representing Guayas Province.

Within her functions as an assembly member, she drafted different bills including one to reform the law against crimes including murder committed against children and adolescents. She was a critic of the assembly's poor productivity when she was identified as an "independent" in 2018.

In 2019 she resigned from the assembly to run as a candidate for Guayaquil Municipal Councilor representing urban constituency 1. She won the corresponding seat as the councilor with the highest votes in the city with 222,766 votes supporting her. In the first of the Guayaquil's council sessions of 2024 she called for unity given the poor state of security in the city.
