= Alausí railway station =

Railway station in Alausí, Chimborazo, Ecuador

Coordinates: 2°12′05″S 78°50′52″W

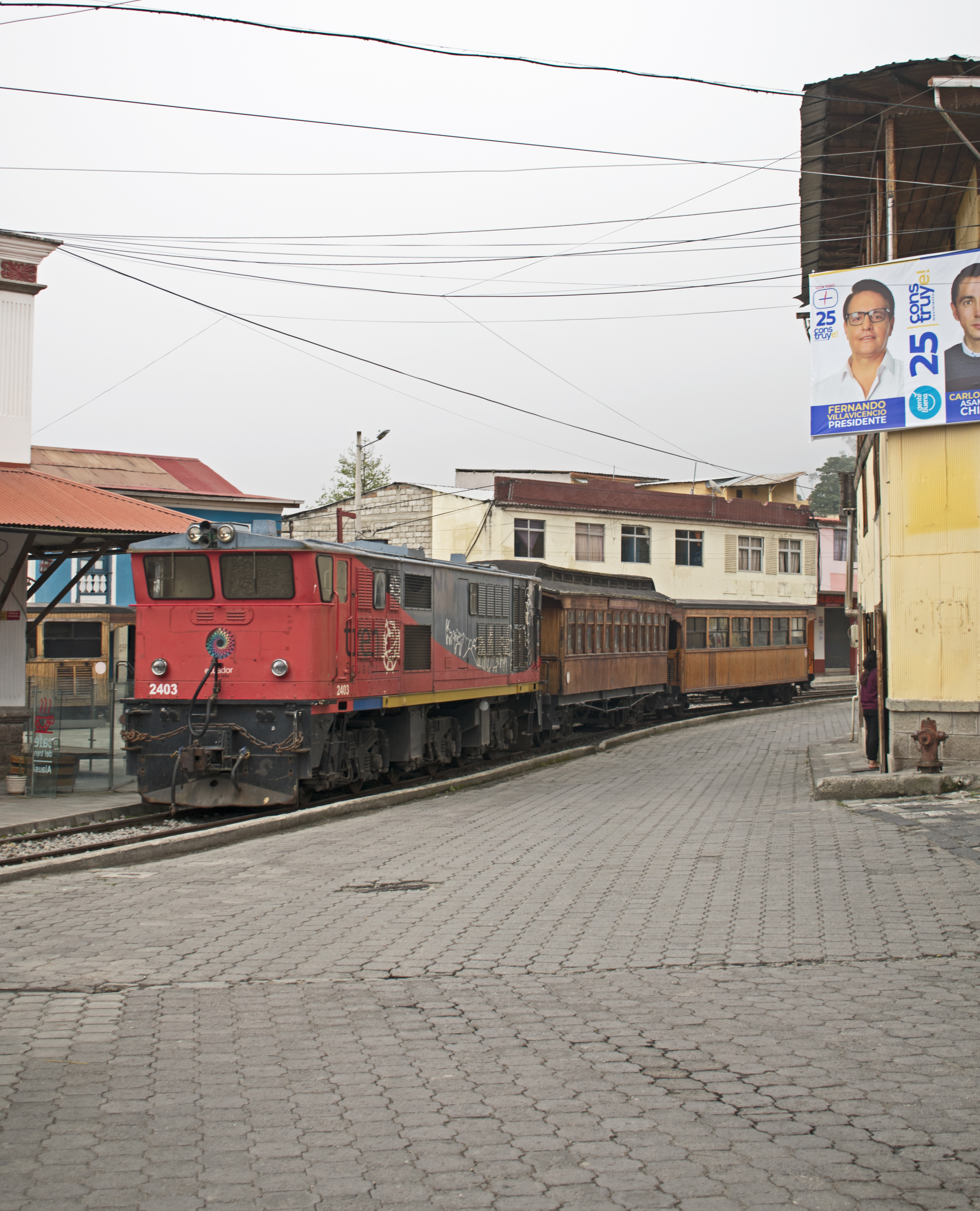

History
- Opened: 8 September 1902
- Rebuilt: 5 July 2025

Services
| Preceding station | Empresa de Ferrocarriles Ecuatorianos | Following station |
|---|---|---|
| Terminus | Nariz del Diablo train | Chiripungo towards Sibambe |
Suspended services (pre-2020)
| Preceding station | Empresa de Ferrocarriles Ecuatorianos | Following station |
|---|---|---|
| Tixan towards San Lorenzo | Main line | Chiripungo towards Durán or Cuenca |
Location

Alausí railway station in Alausí, Chimborazo Province, is located on the only railway in Ecuador, which connects Quito in the north and Durán (a suburb of Guayaquil) in the south. It was opened in 1929.

The railway reached Alausí on 8 September 1902, after passing through Nariz del Diablo, south of Alausí, in 1901.

The station used to be the departure point for tourist trains that continued south to Sibambe station via Nariz del Diablo. Between 2013 and 2020, it was also on the route between Quito and Guayaquil, operated by the Empresa de Ferrocarriles Ecuatorianos.
