= Alausí Parish =

Alausí
- Parish
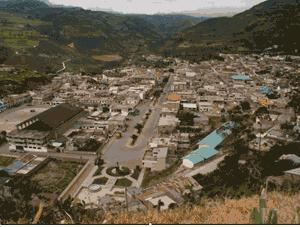
- Alausí
- Interactive map of Alausí
- Coordinates: 2°11′S 78°51′W
- Country: Ecuador
- Province: Chimborazo Province
- Canton: Alausí Canton
- Seat: Alausí

Government
  - Mayor: José Clemente Taday Lema

Population
  - Total: 9,000
- Time zone: UTC-5 (ECT)
- Website: http://www.municipiodealausi.gov.ec

Alausí Parish is an urban parish in Ecuador, Chimborazo Province, Alausí Canton. Its seat is Alausí.
