= Yaguachi Canton =

- Canton
- Flag

- Location of Yaguachi Canton in Guayas Province

- Location of Guayas Province
- Coordinates: 2°7′S 79°41′W
- Country: Ecuador
- Province: Guayas Province
- Capital: Yaguachi

Area
  - Total: 530.4 km^{2} (204.8 sq mi)

Population (2022 census)
  - Total: 72,699
  - Density: 137.1/km^{2} (355.0/sq mi)
- Time zone: UTC-5 (ECT)

Yaguachi Canton is a canton of Ecuador, located in the Guayas Province. Its capital is the town of Yaguachi. Its population at the 2001 census was 47,630.

== Demographics ==
Ethnic groups as of the Ecuadorian census of 2010:

- Mestizo 60.8%
- Montubio 28.1%
- Afro-Ecuadorian 6.3%
- White 4.3%
- Indigenous 0.2%
- Other 0.2%
