= Achupallas Parish =

Achupallas
- Parish
- Interactive map of Achupallas
- Coordinates: 2°16′S 78°44′W
- Country: Ecuador
- Province: Chimborazo Province
- Canton: Alausí Canton
- Seat: Achupallas

Population
  - Total: 10,327
- Time zone: UTC-5 (ECT)

Achupallas Parish is a rural parish in Ecuador, Chimborazo Province, Alausí Canton. Its seat is Achupallas.

== Communities ==
Azuay, Shaglay, Mapaguiña, San Antonio, Bactinag, San Francisco, Shumyd, Letrapungo, Collaloma, Pucará, Totoras, Guangra, Jubal and Pomacocha.
