= Tixán =

Coordinates: 2°9′9″S 78°48′10″W

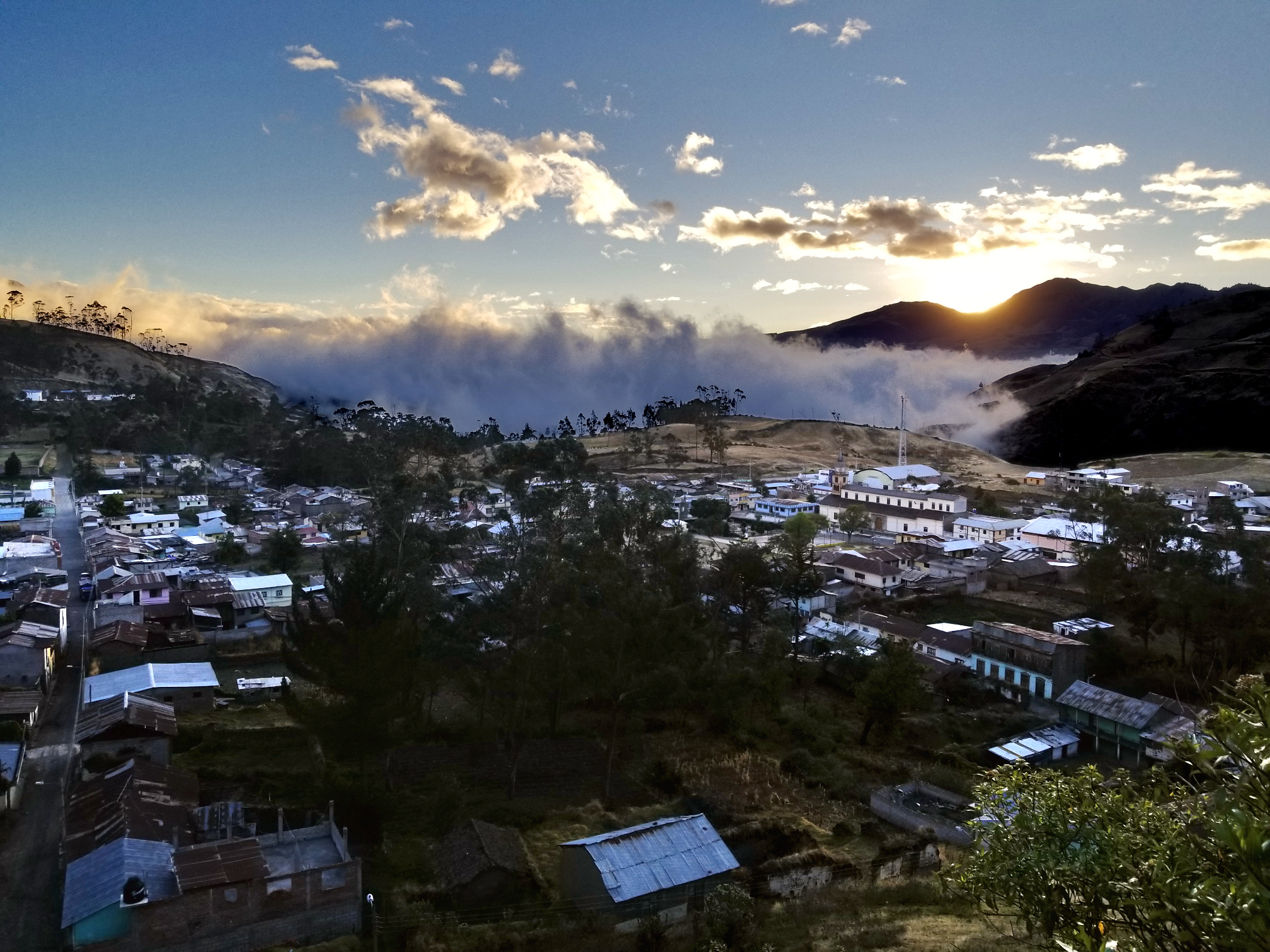
- Interactive map of Tixán

Tixán is a town in the Chimborazo province of Ecuador. It has been found to have copper, sulfur, and gold.
