= Alausí =

- Town
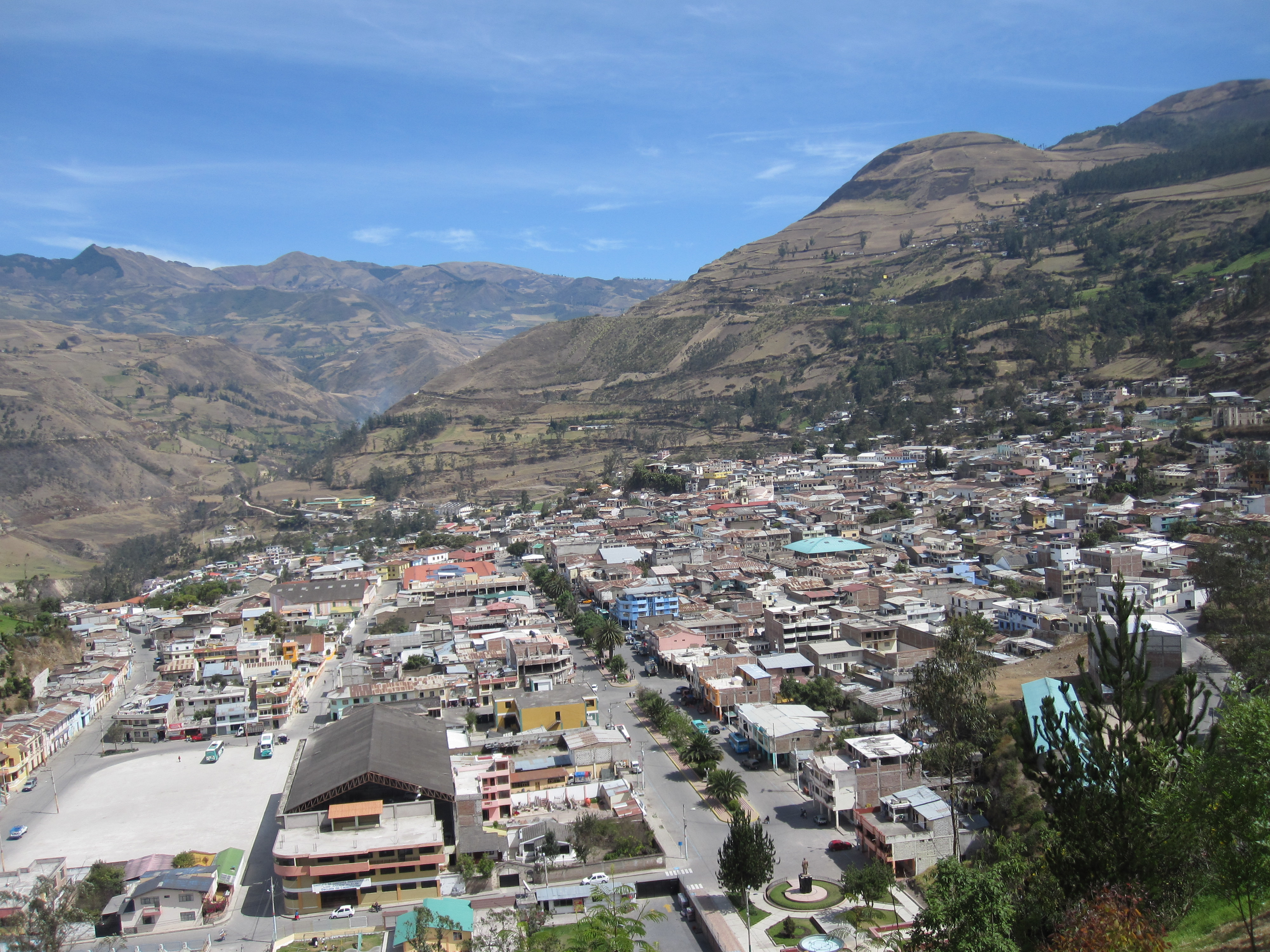

- Location within Ecuador
- Coordinates: 2°11′24″S 78°51′0″W
- Country: Ecuador
- Province: Chimborazo Province
- Canton: Alausí Canton

Government
  - Mayor: Remigio Roldán Cuzco

Area
  - Town: 1.96 km^{2} (0.76 sq mi)

Population (2022 census)
  - Town: 6,071
  - Density: 3,100/km^{2} (8,020/sq mi)

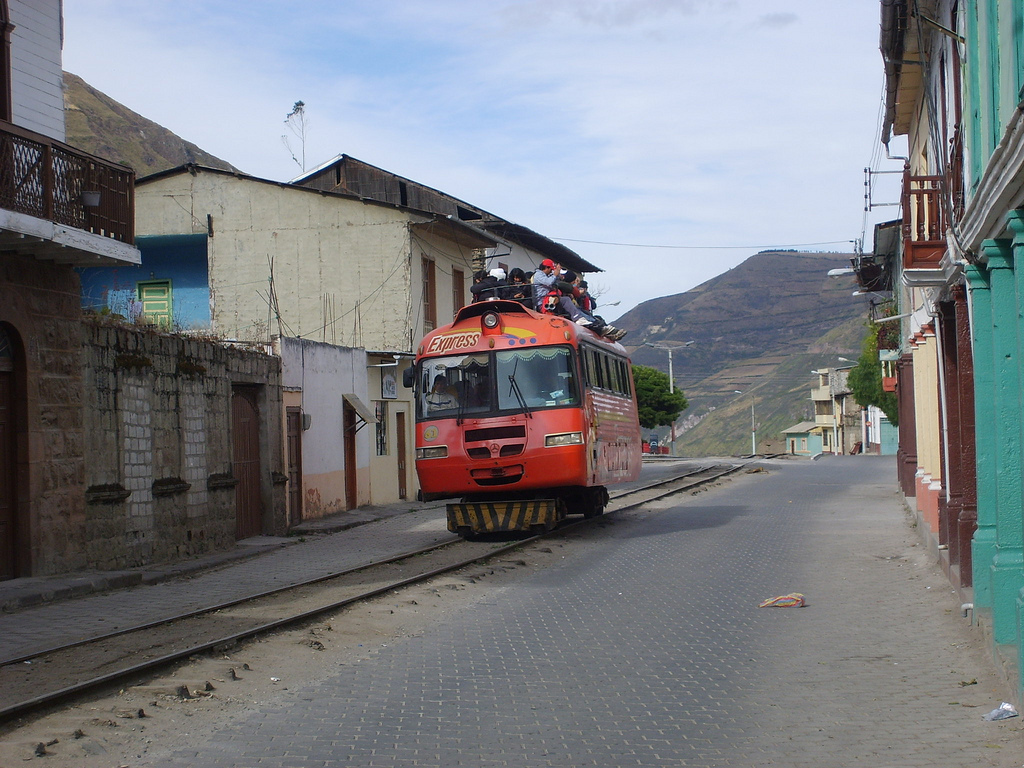
Tourist train leaving Alausí for Nariz del Diablo

Alausí is a town in the Alausi Canton, located in the Chimborazo province in Ecuador.

The town is particularly well-known across Ecuador for its railway heritage. It was named a Pueblo Mágico (magical town) by the Ecuadorian Ministry of Tourism (MINTUR) in 2019.

Alausí is known for its railroad attraction of La Nariz Del Diablo (Devil's Nose). Using a system of switchback it enables the train to zigzag down a steep mountain. The train travels through the Andes where the track descends nearly 500 meters in just 12 kilometers.

== History ==
During the Spanish conquest of Ecuador, the city was named by Sebastián de Belalcázar as San Pedro de Alausí, giving the city the name of the saint of the day, coinciding with the founding of the city of Quito. Later, the founding of the city was legalized by Benálcazar with the name "Alausí". After the creation of the Government of Quito, Alausí formed part of that province as a lesser political and administrative entity.

In 1810, when Quito launched its movement for independence, Alausí recognized the new government and named Captain José Antonio Pontón as its voice and member of the Junta. When the first assembly of the free towns took place in 1811, Captain José Antonio Pontón served as Representative for the Province of Alausí, in which capacity he signed the Carta de Estado de Quito in 1812. In recognition of its patriotism, fidelity, and honor of its inhabitants, the Bishop Cuero y Caicedo resolved that the town's political and administrative status be raised to "Villa".

== Transport ==
Alausí is served by bus to many destinations in Ecuador. Alausi's bus station is located three blocks down from the train station, on 5 de Junio along the town’s main street. Buses to and from smaller towns run regularly. There are set schedules for more popular destinations, such as Quito, Cuenca and Guayaquil.

Alausí railway station is the starting-off point for the Nariz del Diablo train. This engineering work is among the most audacious projects realized in the Andean mountain range. Nariz del Diablo was the tomb of many Jamaican slaves contracted to dynamite the mountain.

Tourists visiting the Ingapirca ruins in Cañar can board a bus heading for Cuenca. The ruins are about an hour and a half outside of Cañar.

== Festivals ==
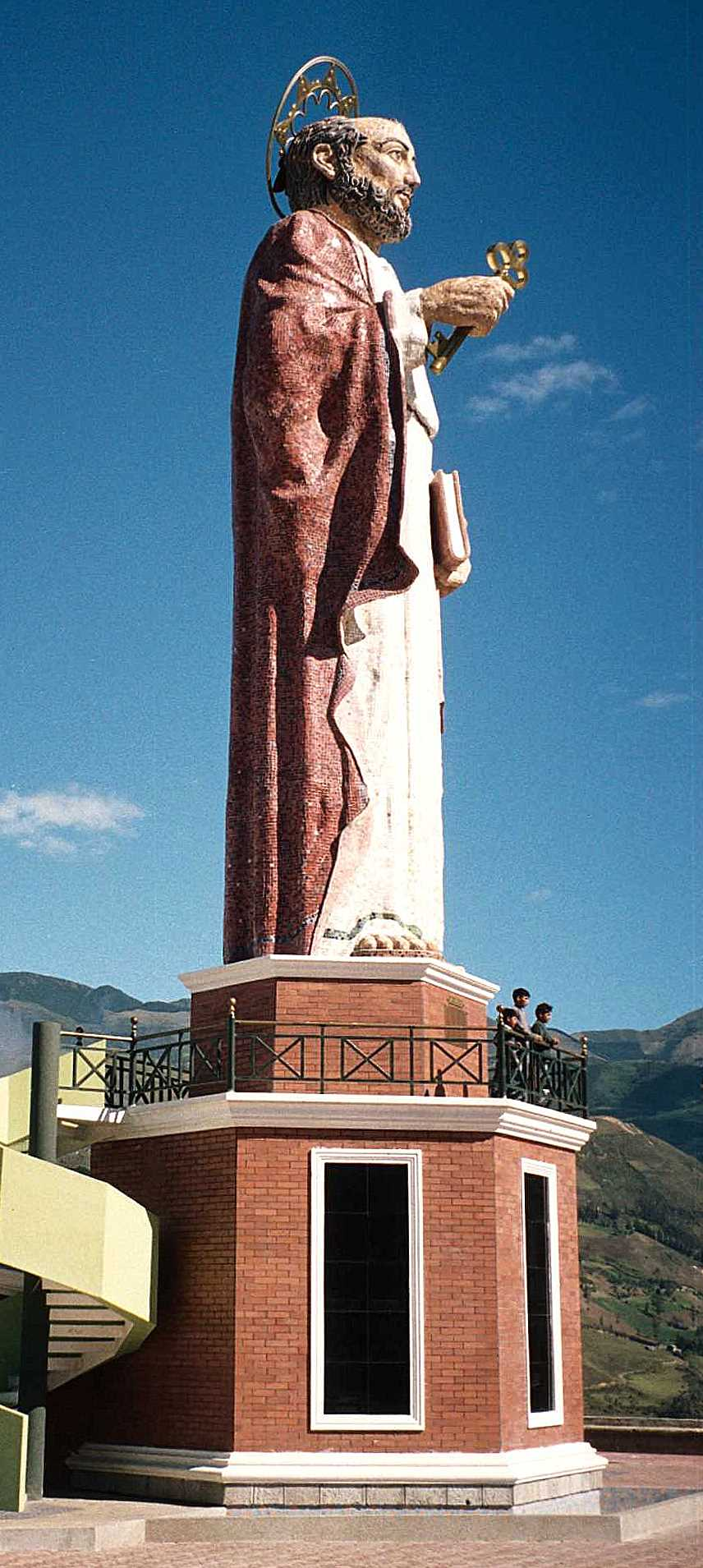
Statue of San Pedro, Alausí

Carnaval is the traditional festival of Alausí and is celebrated with a special parade in which the neighborhoods of the city and special invitees participate. The most important festival is the running of the bulls where bulls are released through a closed street until their final destination at the bullfighting ring, similar to a tradition from Pamplona, Spain.

A testament to the Spanish influence in South America, the Festival of San Pedro is celebrated from June 22 to July 2 and has been celebrated since the colonial era. Traditional dance, music, folklore, cockfights, bullfights and other activities attract Ecuadorian and international tourists to the celebration.

== Notable residents ==
- Bolivar Arellano (born 1944) Ecuadorian-American photographer and businessman

== See also ==
- Empresa de Ferrocarriles Ecuatorianos
- Pueblos Mágicos (Ecuador)
