= San Lorenzo, Ecuador =

San Lorenzo
- Town
- Location within Ecuador
- Coordinates: 1.28508°N 78.83395°W
- Country: Ecuador
- Province: Esmeraldas
- Canton: San Lorenzo Canton

Area
  - Town: 4.62 km^{2} (1.78 sq mi)

Population (2022 census)
  - Town: 28,491
  - Density: 6,170/km^{2} (16,000/sq mi)

San Lorenzo is a port town on the north coast of Ecuador, about 18 km south of the Colombian border. It was joined by a narrow gauge rail to the city of Ibarra in the Highlands and for many years it was an important port for the export of balsa wood and tagua.

As of 2022 San Lorenzo had a population of 28,491.

== Climate ==
Climate data for San Lorenzo, elevation 40 m (130 ft), (1971–2000)
Month	Jan	Feb	Mar	Apr	May	Jun	Jul	Aug	Sep	Oct	Nov	Dec	Year
Mean daily maximum °C (°F)	31.0 (87.8)	31.5 (88.7)	31.4 (88.5)	31.4 (88.5)	30.9 (87.6)	30.3 (86.5)	30.6 (87.1)	30.3 (86.5)	30.3 (86.5)	30.2 (86.4)	29.9 (85.8)	30.1 (86.2)	30.7 (87.2)
Mean daily minimum °C (°F)	22.0 (71.6)	22.1 (71.8)	22.5 (72.5)	22.5 (72.5)	22.6 (72.7)	22.1 (71.8)	22.0 (71.6)	21.7 (71.1)	21.9 (71.4)	21.9 (71.4)	21.8 (71.2)	22.0 (71.6)	22.1 (71.8)
Average precipitation mm (inches)	253.0 (9.96)	295.0 (11.61)	301.0 (11.85)	327.0 (12.87)	298.0 (11.73)	308.0 (12.13)	203.0 (7.99)	119.0 (4.69)	138.0 (5.43)	143.0 (5.63)	87.0 (3.43)	153.0 (6.02)	2,625 (103.34)
Average relative humidity (%)	88	86	87	87	89	89	90	89	90	89	88	88	88
Source: FAO
