= Cotacachi =

Cotacachi may refer to:

1. Cotacachi Volcano, a dormant volcano in western Imbabura Province, Ecuador
2. Cotacachi, a city near the volcano
3. Cotacachi Canton, a canton around the city
4. Cotacachi Cayapas Ecological Reserve, a national park around the volcano
