= San Antonio de Ibarra =

- City
- San Antonio de Ibarra
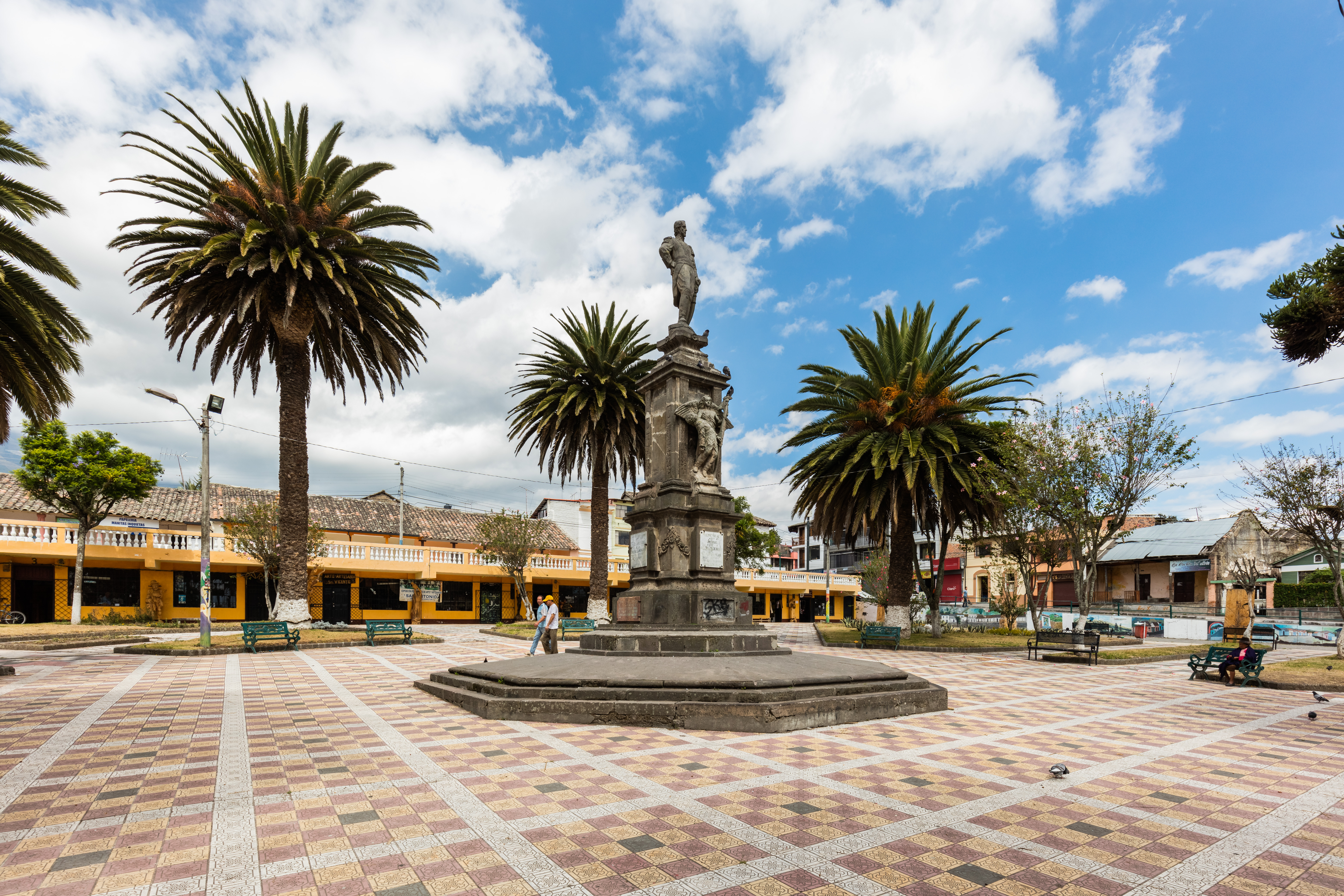
- Plaza de Armas in San Antonio
- Nickname: Capital de la artesanía
- Location within Ecuador
- Coordinates: 0°21′45.64″N 78°07′50.40″W
- Country: Ecuador
- Province: Imbabura
- Canton: Ibarra Canton
- Founded: 1683
- Named for: Don Miguel de Ibarra
- Elevation: 2,200 m (7,200 ft)

Population (2011 census)
  - Total: 17,500
- Time zone: UTC-5 (ECT)
- Climate: Csb

San Antonio de Ibarra is a city in northern Ecuador that lies at the foot of the Imbabura Volcano and on the left bank of the Tahuando River in Imbabura Province. It is about 7 kilometres (4.3 mi) from the provincial capital of Ibarra and about 70 kilometres (43 mi) northeast of Ecuador's capital Quito.

== History ==
The city was founded in 1683, but there is evidence of human settlement from 100 years before.

== Culture ==
San Antonio is famous for its wood artisans. For this is called also the Capital of wood artisans. Pope Francis, during his July 2015 visit to Ecuador, received a wood sculpture made by Jorge Villalba, born in San Antonio, as a gift.

== Monuments ==
- Cathedral
- Episcopal church
- Imbabura Volcano

== People born in San Antonio ==
- Leonidas Proaño, (1910-1988) bishop
