= Llurimagua Project =

Llurimagua Project is a copper and molybdenum mining project in Imbabura Province, Ecuador. It is named after Llurimagua, which is a community in the area. Ecuadorean state mining company ENAMI and Chilean state-owned counterpart Corporacion Nacional del Cobre, or Codelco started advanced exploration in 2015 in the area's primary cloud forest after hundreds of police had to intervene to secure the area.

It is in Intag in the Cordillera de Toisán and includes 4,839 hectares. Sampling in the area was done already. In China, there is interest in cooperation.

In late 2025 the Ecuadorian government reported it would put up the mining concession for public auction, implying Codelco is abandoning the project.
