= Ambuquí =

- Rural parish
- Ambuquí
- Location within Ecuador
- Coordinates: 0°27′00.7″N 78°00′27.3″W
- Country: Ecuador
- Province: Imbabura
- Canton: Ibarra Canton
- Time zone: UTC-5 (ECT)
- Climate: BSh

Ambuquí is a rural parish in northern Ecuador in the Imbabura Province. It is located in the Chota Valley 29 km away from Ibarra.

The parish is also considered one of the major producers of the reddish yellow variety of the Spondias purpurea in the country. This fruit is called "hobo" in Spanish but it is spelled "ovo" locally, probably to distinguish it from the Central American hobo (spelled like that in the Antilles and, "jobo" in the rest of Spanish speaking countries) which is yellow.

The Real Academia Española defines "ovo" as an egg-shaped architectural ornament, though.
