= Urcuquí =

- Town
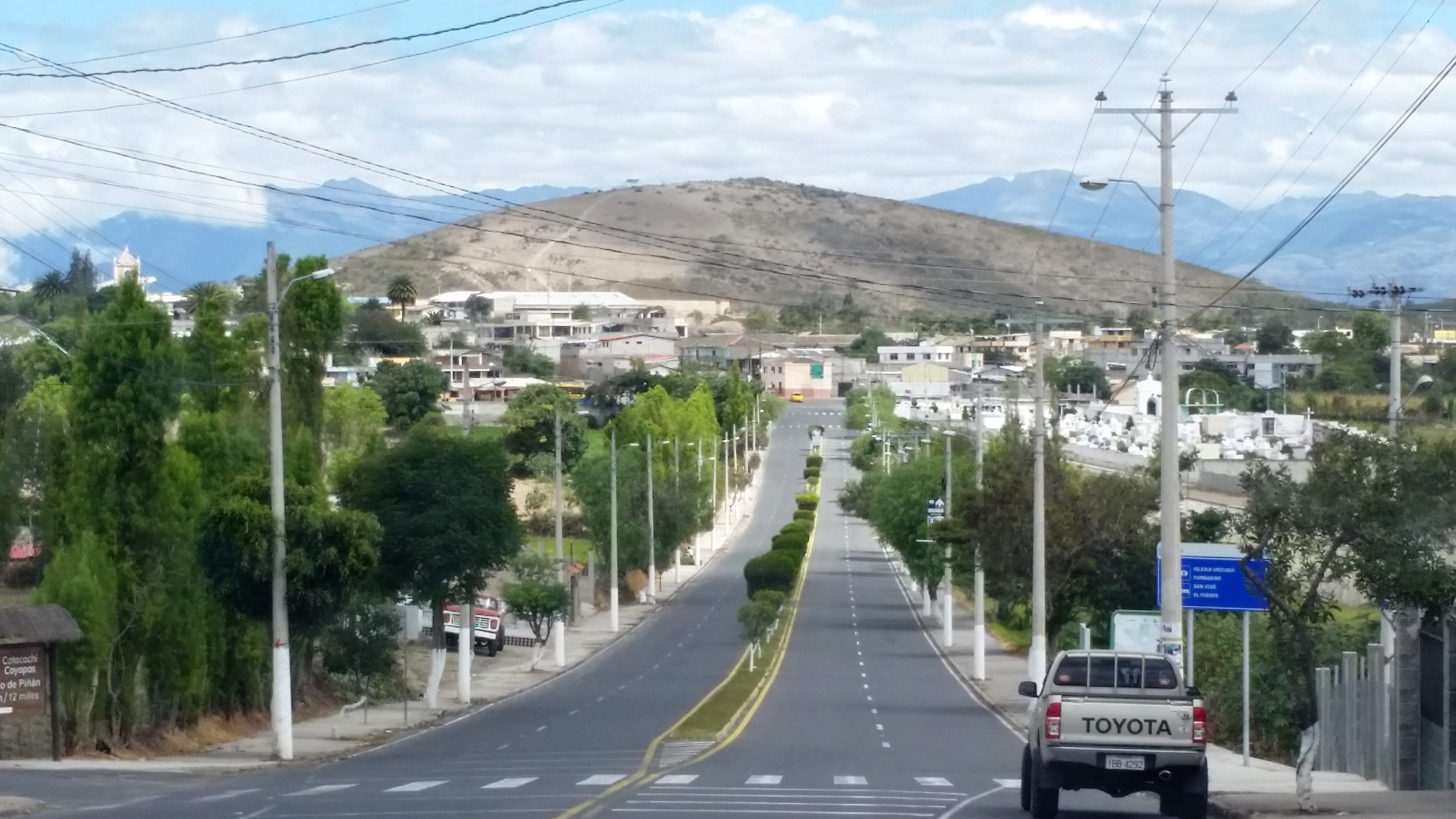

- Location within Ecuador
- Coordinates: 0°25′12.41″N 78°11′35.59″W
- Ecuador: Ecuador
- Province: Imbabura
- Canton: San Miguel de Urcuquí
- Founded: February 9, 1984

Area
  - Town: 2.96 km^{2} (1.14 sq mi)
- Elevation: 2,307 m (7,569 ft)

Population (2022 census)
  - Town: 4,480
  - Density: 1,510/km^{2} (3,920/sq mi)
- Time zone: UTC-5 (ECT)
- Website: Official website (in Spanish)

Urcuquí, also known as San Miguel de Urcuquí, is a town located in the north of Ecuador. It is the seat of the San Miguel de Urcuquí Canton of the Imbabura Province.

This town limits to the North with the parish of Salinas in the Ibarra canton; to the South with the parishes of Imbaya, Chaltura and Atuntaqui of the Antonio Ante canton, and the Imantag parish of the Cotacachi canton; to the East with the rural parish of San Blas in the Urcuquí canton and to the West with the Ibarra canton.

== History ==
The plenary session of the Legislative Commissions decrees in the city of Quito on February 9, 1984, the creation of the San Miguel de Urcuquí Canton in the province of Imbabura, its cantonal head, to be Urcuquí. Being the official Cantonization date the previously mentioned. The first President of the Municipal Council was Mauro Francisco López, who previously worked in the Pro-Cantonization Committee.

== Toponymy ==
The name of this town and the canton originates, after in these territories, in ancient times, they were inhabited by various Ayllu (indigenous families), where due to the good and developed organization the Urcuquíes, who gave the aboriginal name of URCUCIQUE, which phonetically consists of two Quichua voices: URCU, which means hill and CIQUE, which means seat; that is, "hill seat". Currently the phonetic composition with Spanish determined the town as Urcuquí.

== Economy ==
Its inhabitants have as their main activity agriculture and livestock, products from cold and subtropical climates are grown, in this order the production includes: potatoes, corn, geese, mellocos, morochillo, wheat, beans, barley, banana, beans, sugar cane, cassava, papaya, naranjilla, among others. Regarding livestock, the main livestock economic activity is developed around beef cattle, porcino, caballar and wool. On the other hand, there are micro-companies that produce dairy products and all their derivatives.
