= Cotacachi Canton =

- Canton
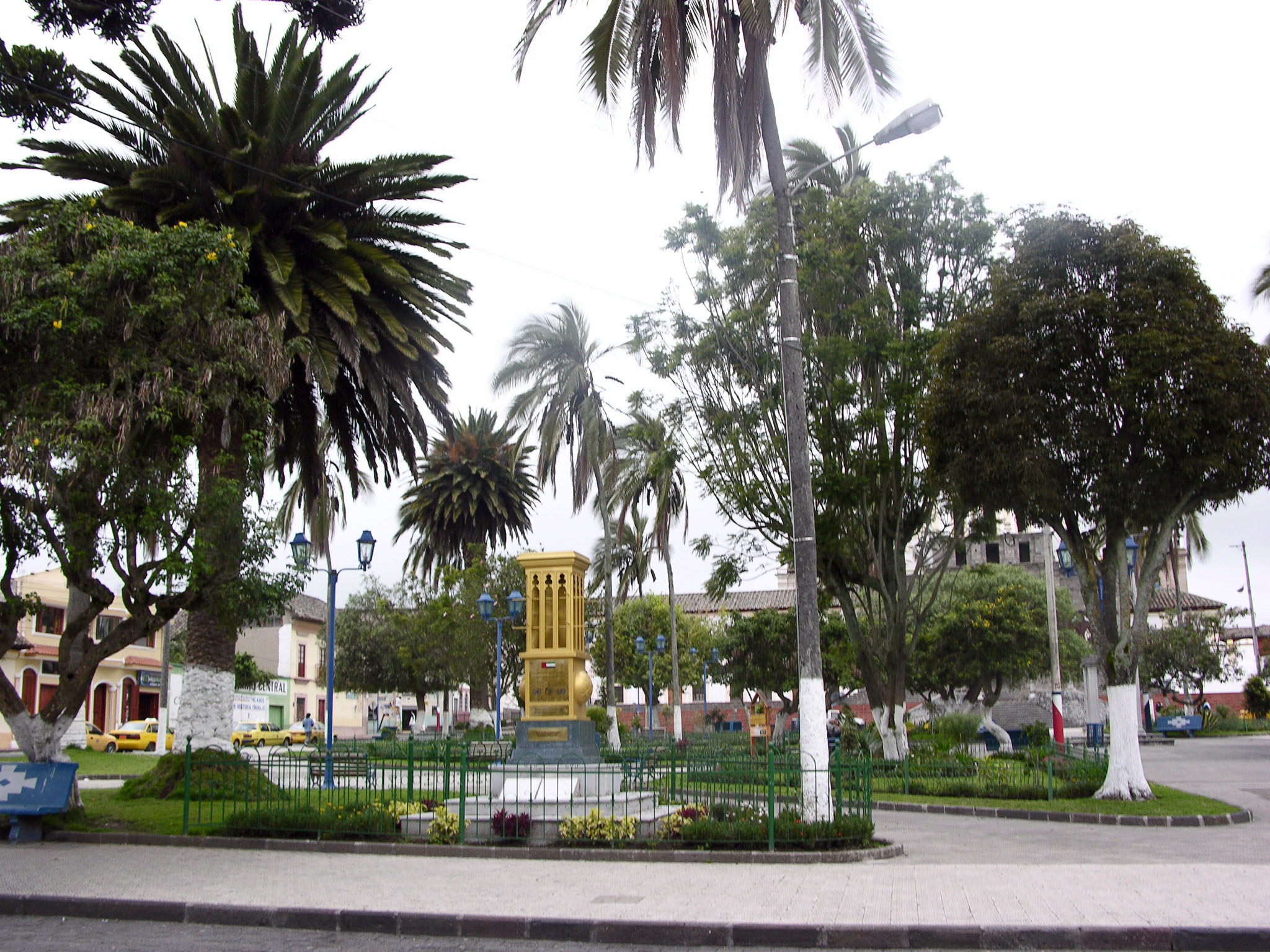
- Cotacachi

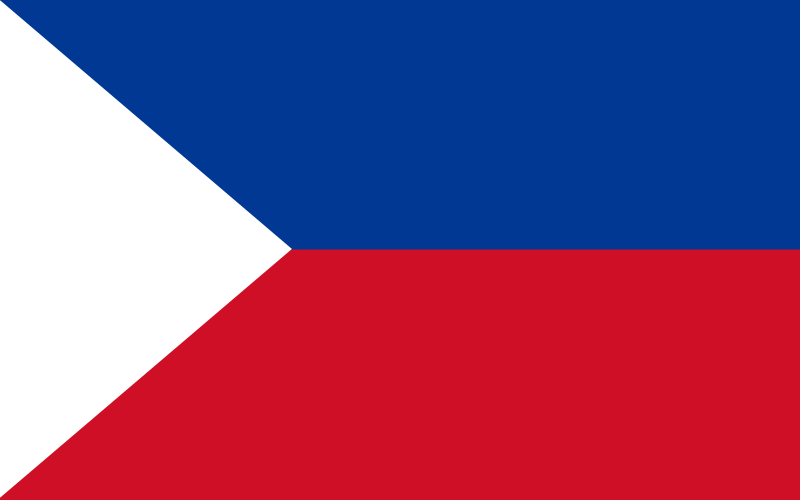
- Flag

- Location of Imbabura Province in Ecuador.

- Cantons of Imbabura Province
- Country: Ecuador
- Province: Imbabura Province
- Capital: Cotacachi

Area
  - Total: 1,863 km^{2} (719 sq mi)

Population (2022 census)
  - Total: 53,001
  - Density: 28.45/km^{2} (73.68/sq mi)
- Time zone: UTC-5 (ECT)

Cotacachi is a canton of Imbabura province of Ecuador in South America. The name also refers to Cotacachi, the seat of that canton, which is one of Ecuador's leading artisanal manufacturers of leather goods, and to the dormant Cotacachi Volcano which overlooks the canton.

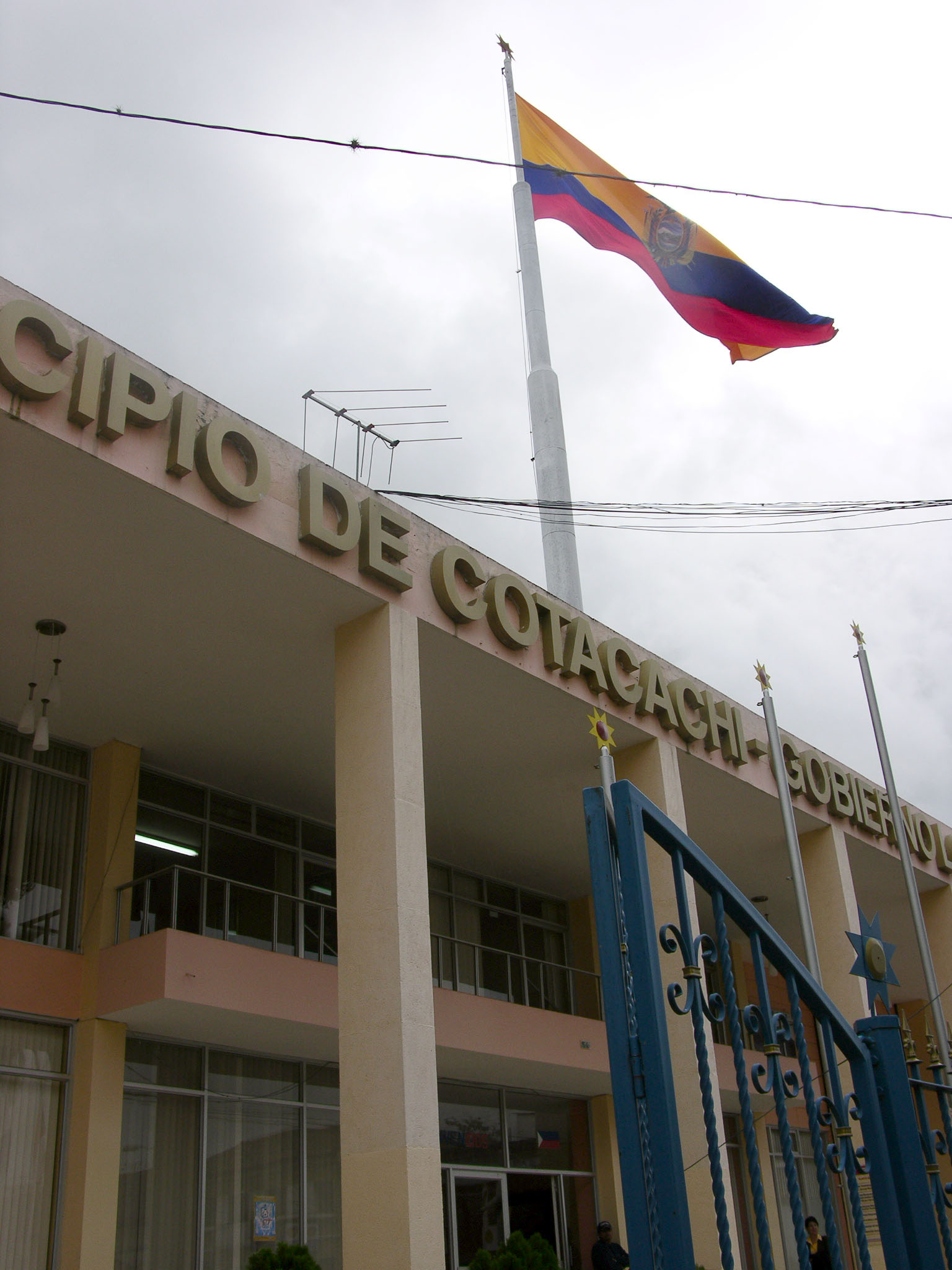
Administrative seat of the Canton of Cotacachi, located in the town of Cotacachi

Cotacachi Canton had a population of 37,215 in the 2001 census and 40,036 in the 2010 census. The area is 1,726 square kilometres (666 sq mi).

The Canton is divided into nine parishes: 6 de Julio de Cuellaje, Apuela, Cotacachi (Kutakachi), García Morena (Llurimagua, Llurimawa), Imantag, Peñagerrera, Plaza Gutiérrez (Calvario, Kalwaryu), Quiroga, Vacas Galindo (El Churo).

The city of Cotacachi holds a UNESCO medal for being free of illiteracy. In 2000 the canton of Cotacachi was declared the first ecological county of South America.

The name Cotacachi has many meanings. In "Cara" it means "lake with women breast" which refers to the general shape of the island in Cuicocha lake; in Quichua it means powder salt. The ecosystems of the area and the native flora and fauna makes this canton one of the ecologically richest zones in South America. The area attracts tourists for bird-watching, camping, and fly fishing.

The weather in the area ranges from 9 to 25 degrees Celsius and is cooler in the evenings.

In the last decade Cotacachi has implemented a new system of local development by creating a city council. All the sectors of the society, from children to the ancient, rural and urban representatives participate in the council. Cotacachi is an example of development and progress.

Ascendant Corporation plans to raze to the ground the villages of Junín, Cerro Pelado, and El Triunfo in order to make ground for copper mining. Since the complete moratorium passed on all mining in Ecuador (as of May 2008), however, this has been delayed if not completely halted.

Pachakutik, a party of the indigenous population gained four of five seats in the area at the 2004 local elections. For the 2009-2014 period, Alberto Anrango (supporter of the Alianza PAIS party) was the mayor of Cotacachi. In 2014, Jomar Cevallos, founder of the new party, Ally Kawsay ("Vivir Bien" in Spanish, or "Good Living" in English), won the election for the 2015-2019 period.

Cotacachi is known for quality leather goods; it has a number of shops on "Leather Street" that sell coats, jackets, shoes, and specialty items. It is also known for its traditional local cuisine including the “carne colorada” dish, which is based on pork cooked with achiote and served with cooked potato, corn, mote, empanada and avocado.

Cotacachi was designated a Pueblo Mágico (magical town) by the Ecuadorian Ministry of Tourism (MINTUR) in 2019. It is one of the country's five original Pueblos Mágicos.

== Demographics ==
Cotacachi canton has an area of 1,687 square kilometres (651 sq mi) and had a population of 42,010 in 2010. The capital of the canton, the town of Cotacachi, had a population of 8,848 in 2010.

Ethnic groups as of the Ecuadorian census of 2010:

- Mestizo 53.5%
- Indigenous 40.6%
- Afro-Ecuadorian 2.8%
- White 2.5%
- Montubio 0.5%
- Other 0.2%

== See also ==
- Cotacachi Cayapas Ecological Reserve
- Cuicocha, (Guinea Pig Lake)
