= Intag =

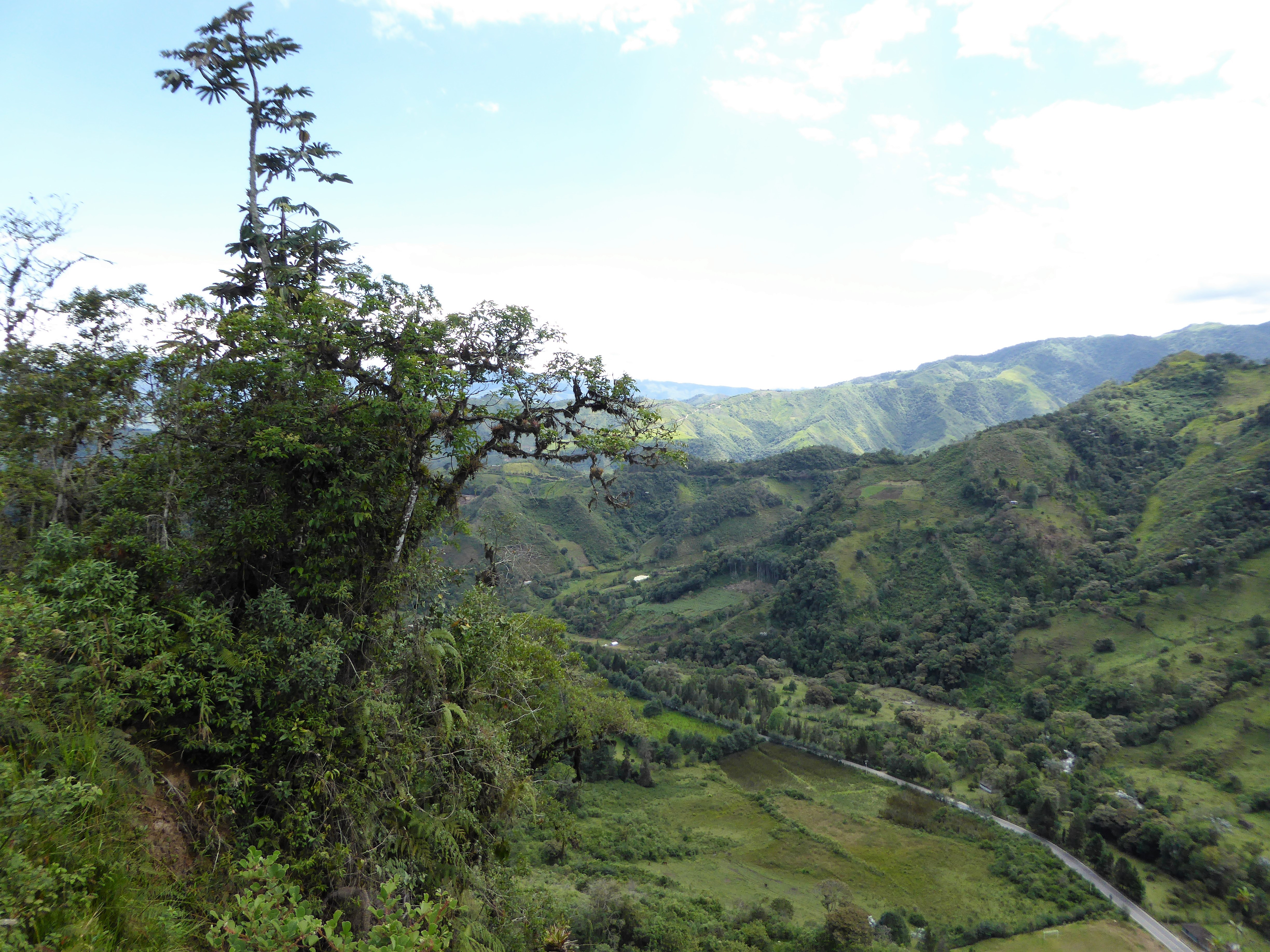
Landscape in Intag

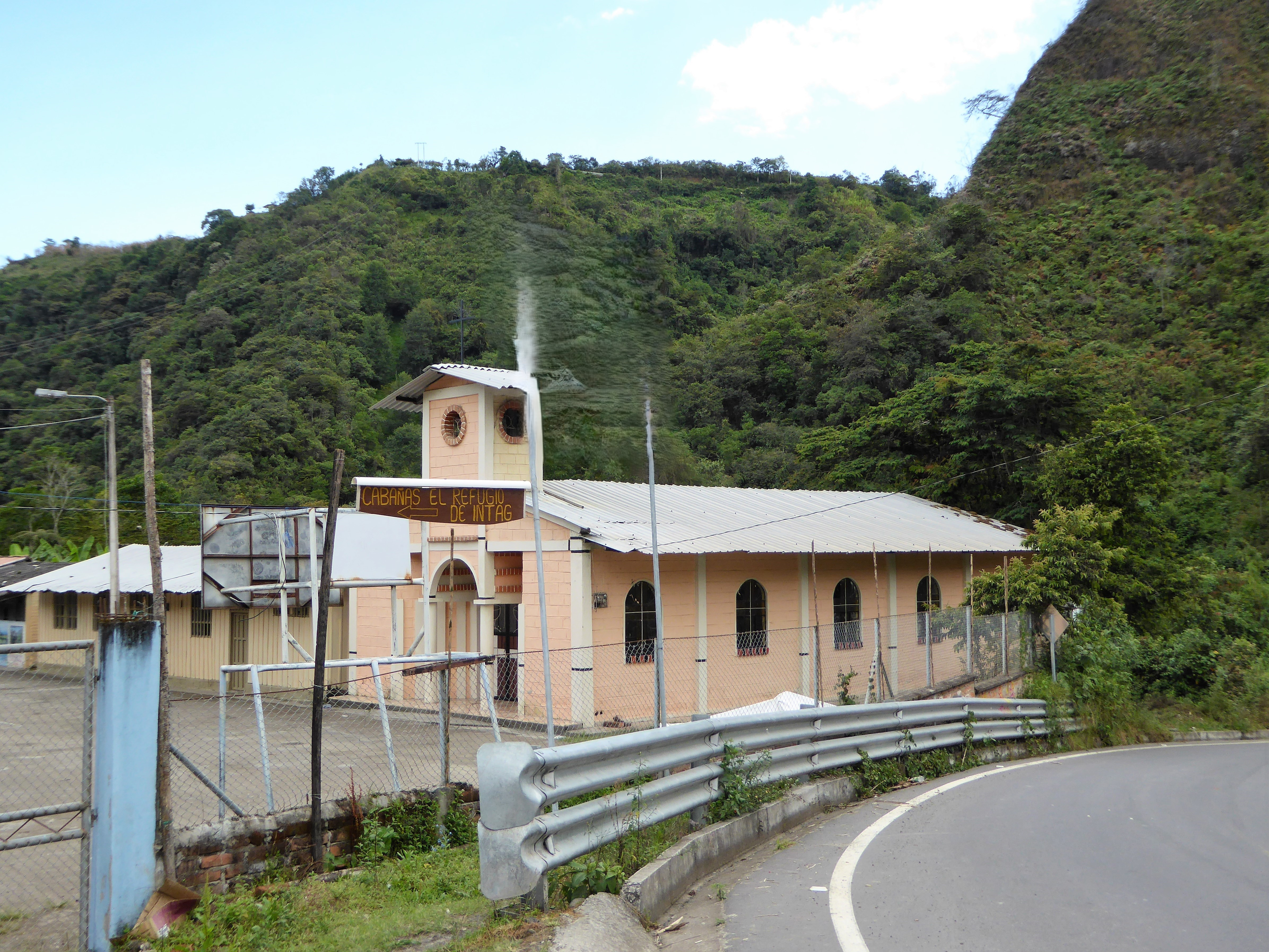
Church in Intag with a sign saying ″No a la Minería″.

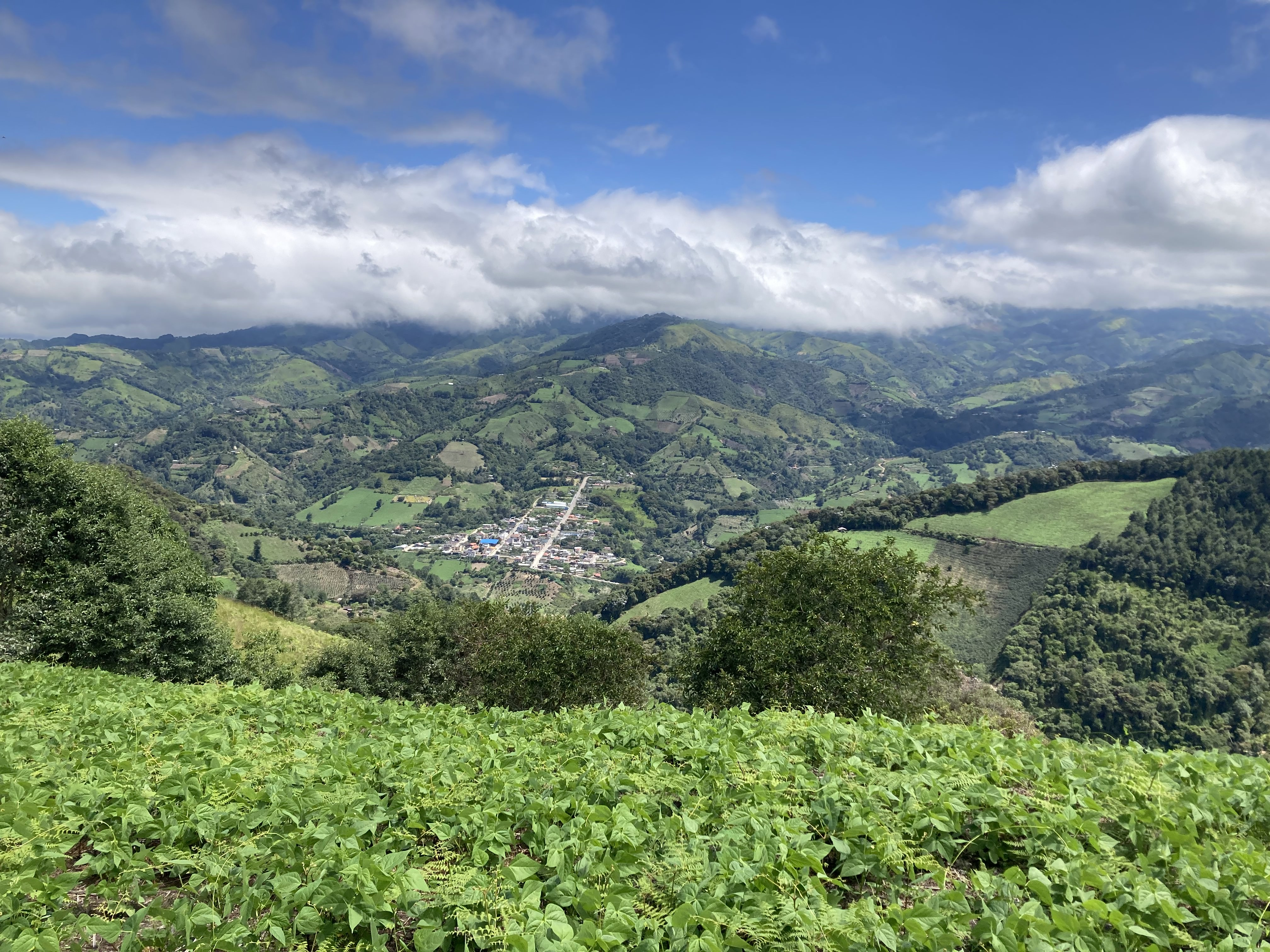
Cuellaje, a town in the Intag region

Intag is a remote, partly mountainous area in Cotacachi Canton and Otavalo Canton Imbabura Province, Ecuador, named for the Intag river. It includes Intag Cloud Forest Reserve, which has primary cloud forest at 1800–2800 m and a high biodiversity. Cotacachi Cayapas National Park borders to the North.

== Geography ==
Intag varies greatly in altitude from approximately 600 meters above sea level to 3.500 meters, which accounts for its exceptional biodiversity. Parts of the Intag region are considered tropical montane forests of the Andes. Most of the area's forests are cloud forests. The Andes there are steep and rugged. Including the Intag river, there are hundreds of rivers and streams in the area.

== Biodiversity and Environment ==
Intag includes or used to include one of the areas with the highest biodiversity on earth. It harbors numerous endangered species, including the spectacled bear, the harlequin frog, and the jaguar.

The region faces various environmental concerns. Reforestation takes place in Intag. A Mitsubishi subsidiary, which had contaminated Junín river and caused deforestation, was expelled in 1997. Subsequently, Canadian Copper Mesa was expelled in 2010 In other parts of Intag, Canadian Cornerstone and BHP were unable to develop mining due to firm community resistance.

DECOIN (Defensa y Conservación Ecológica de Intag) an environmental organization, has been founded in 1995 and has created a sensitivity concerning a possible destruction of this environment. One of the organization's main successes has been the creation of 38 community-owed watershed reserves protecting 12, 000 hectares of primary and secondary cloud forests. In part due to their conservation work, DECOIN was awarded the prestigious Equator Prize in 2017 by the United Nations Development Program.

== Mining ==
Mining activities started in the 1990s with the presence of Mitsubishi subsidiary Bishimentals. The company left in 2008 but not before they found copper laying under the area's primary biodiverse forests. In 2002, the ministry of energy and mining offered mining concessions in Intag publicly. Canadian mining corporation Ascendant Copper were awarded those in 2004. There was widespread resistance against the mining project (Radio Intag).,. The intention of mining is opposed by locals. Locals were threatened and beaten by security staff hired by Ascendant Copper. Not only human rights abuses by companies, but also by government have occurred. Ascendant Copper would face difficulties and created a plan to buy land.

The Inter-American Human Rights Commission Organization was informed. With support of Canadian organizations Friends of Nature and MiningWatch Canada, a claim against Ascendant Copper for having violated safeguards established in standards for multinational companies was filed with the OECD. In 2005, three months before Copper Mesa (then Ascendant Copper) was listed on the Toronto Stock Exchange, County Mayor Auki Tituaña wrote to the Finance and Audit Committee of the Toronto Stock Exchange: "We consider it to be appropriate and fair that before accepting open "trade" of Ascendant Copper Corporation's stocks in the Stock Market, you evaluate in depth the "new" company's merits..." Because of the Toronto Stock Exchange facilitating trading stocks in the Exchange, funds which were used to violate human rights on the ground, in 2009, the communities sued the Toronto Stock Exchange. Shortly after, the company was suspended from trading.

In 2024, Ecuador's Constitutional Court ratified a lower court decision that suspended mining activities in the Junin area. As of late 2025, no mining has taken place in the Llurimagua mining concession, nor in other 20 mining concession in the Intag Valley.

In 2002, the Ministry of Energy and Mines a uctioned off 7,000 hectares of subsoil rights in Junín. The following year, Cotacachi Municipality, six parishes, communities and NGOs requested a restraining order from the courts.

Under Rich Earth is a film covering this actions of the Canadian miner and debuted at Toronto International Film Festival.

In 2009, the government of Ecuador prohibited any activity of Ascendant Copper in Ecuador.

In 2014 Codelco of Chile, the world's biggest copper producer, and Ecuador-owned ENAMI EP were able to access the mining site with the support of hundreds of police and military and explored the area from 2014 to 2018, but no mining has taken place since 2018. In late 2025, it was reported that CODELCO was also ready to abandon the Llurimagua mining project. That would make it the third transnational mining company unable to develop the mining site, and the fifth whose plans have been thwarted in Intag.

== Population ==
Intag had a population of 17,000 people in 2020. Its parishes in Cotacachi Canton are Apuela, García Moreno, Vacas Galindo, Peñaherrera, Cuellaje and Plaza Gutiérrez. The Parish of Selva Alegre is within the Otavalo County. Intag has more than 90 hamlets. The population of Intag mostly mestizo, indigenous and African origin. Many residents of Intag make their living by subsistence farming or cattle raising. The land is very productive. Because of the elevational differences all kinds of the crops are grown. These include: corn, beans, avocados, bananas, papayas, naranjilla, tree tomatoes, granadillas, citrus, pitajaya and cacao. Arabica coffee is widely grown in the middle and higher altitudes, and a number of coffee producers participate in a fairtrade-growers' association.

== Hydropower ==
Intag has numerous hydrologic reserves. The people from Intag see the forests as their core source of water. Large hydropower projects have faced resistance . but, as of 2025, small- community-controlled projects are starting to be built. DECOIN has contributed heavily to the sustainability of hydro projects by protecting watersheds since 2000, and has, to date, created 38 community-owned watershed reserves protecting 12,000 hectares (30,000 acres) of primary and secondary cloud forests.
