= Antonio Ante Canton =

- Canton
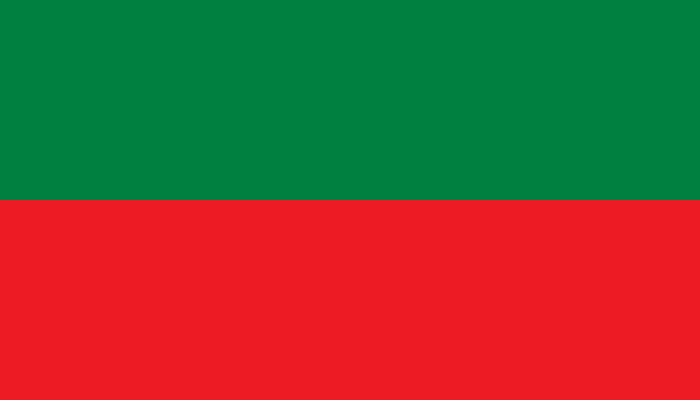
- Flag

- Location of Imbabura Province in Ecuador.

- Cantons of Imbabura Province
- Coordinates: 0.32°N 78.21°W
- Country: Ecuador
- Province: Imbabura Province
- Capital: Atuntaqui

Area
  - Total: 79.79 km^{2} (30.81 sq mi)

Population (2022 census)
  - Total: 53,771
  - Density: 673.9/km^{2} (1,745/sq mi)
- Time zone: UTC-5 (ECT)

Antonio Ante Canton is a canton of Ecuador, located in Imbabura Province. Its population at the 2001 census was 36,053. and increased to 43,518 in the 2010 census. The canton has an area of 79.79 square kilometres (30.81 sq mi).

Its capital is the town of Atuntaqui, located 10 kilometres (6.2 mi) east in straight line distance from the provincial capital of Ibarra. The province is in the Andes, the capital at an elevation of 2,405 metres (7,890 ft) above sea level.

Antonio Ante is divided into five parishes: Atuntaqui (Hauntaki), Imbaya (San Luis de Cobuendo), San Francisco de Natabuela (Natawila), San José de Chaltura, and San Roque.

== Demographics ==
Ethnic groups as of the Ecuadorian census of 2010:

- Mestizo 77.6%
- Indigenous 17.8%
- White 2.5%
- Afro-Ecuadorian 1.8%
- Montubio 0.2%
- Other 0.1%
