= ENAMI =

ENAMI is an acronym that may refer to:

- ENAMI (Chile), Empresa Nacional de Minería, state-owned company established in 1960
- ENAMI (Ecuador), Empresa Nacional Minera, state-owned company established in 2010
