= Cotacachi (city) =

Town in Imbabura Province, Ecuador

- Town
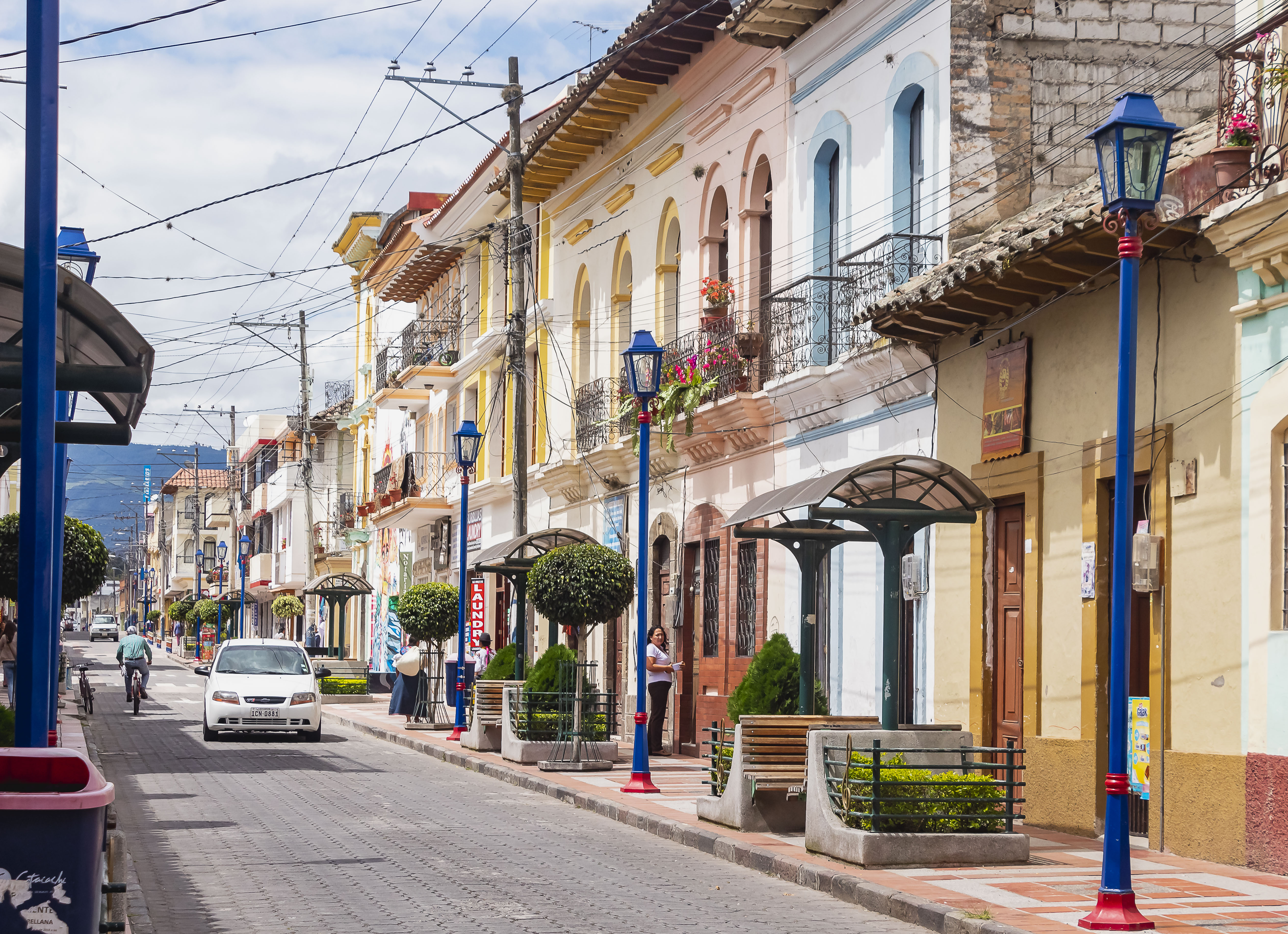
- Calle Bolívar in Cotacachi

- Location within Ecuador
- Coordinates: 0.29998°N 78.26424°W
- Country: Ecuador
- Province: Imbabura
- Canton: Cotacachi Canton

Area
  - Town: 5.45 km^{2} (2.10 sq mi)

Population (2022 census)
  - Town: 10,526
  - Density: 1,930/km^{2} (5,000/sq mi)

Cotacachi (officially known as Santa Ana de Cotacachi) is a town that is the seat of Cotacachi Canton, Imbabura Province, Ecuador, in South America. Cotacachi is located at an altitude of 2,418 metres (7,933 ft) and had a population of 10,526 in 2022.

Cotacachi is an artisan city that is famous for its leather goods and handicrafts. Cotacachi residents are also well known for their carne colorada (filet of pork cooked in red achiote sauce), and queso de hoja (soft cheese wrapped in a plant leaf).

The city of Cotacachi was presented with a UNESCO Cities for Peace Prize on March 18th 2002.

Cotacachi was designated a Pueblo Mágico (magical town) by the Ecuadorian Ministry of Tourism (MINTUR) in 2019. It is one of the country's five original Pueblos Mágicos.

== Geography ==
The city is located 8 km (5 miles) northwest of the artisan city of Otavalo, about 4.8 km (3 miles) west of the Pan-American Highway (Route 35). It lies in the valley between the volcanos of Imbabura and Cotacachi. There are two main entrances to the city, both stemming exit off the Pan-American Highway. The first entrance feeds directly into the city's main square, while the other turns into the famed Calle 10 de Agosto (locally known as Leather Street).

== Demography ==
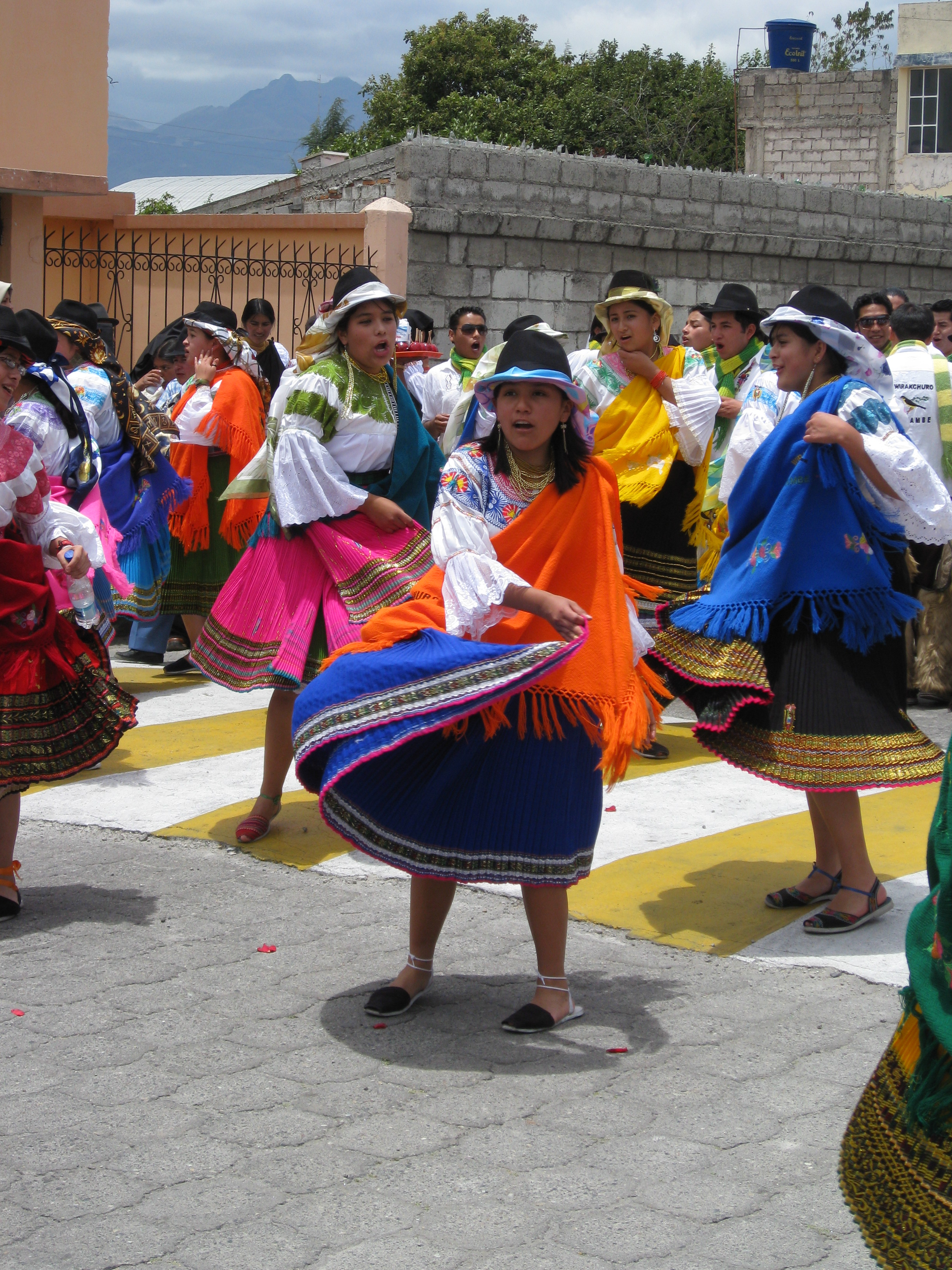
Cotacachi dancers

Cotacachi and the surrounding communities boasts one of the highest concentrations of indigenous people in the country of Ecuador. Due to its location close to the metropolitan areas of Ibarra and Quito, as well as proximity to the coastal province of Esmeraldas, it is also home to great diversity. Many mestizo people (coming from Quito) and many Afro-Ecuadorians (coming from Esmeraldas) live in and around the city. In recent years, the demographic has shifted to include many foreign retirees. On a recent census, the number of resident foreigners totaled more than 500.

== Climate ==
The climate is mild year-round. Situated in the inter-Andean valley temperatures are generally between 21 and 27 degrees C (70 and 80 degrees F) during the day, and between 10 and 16 degrees C (50 and 60 degrees F) at night.

== Leather ==
Cotacachi is considered the "Leather Capital of Ecuador". With over 50 separate artisanal leather shops in the city, many of the leather goods sold in other parts of Ecuador are produced in Cotacachi.

== Inti Raymi ==
An annual fiesta of San Juan, San Pedro, y San Pablo (also known as Inti Raymi, or the "Sun Festival" in Kichwa) in late June is celebrated in the city, with many different ceremonies and the main event, known as "taking of the plaza", during which the groups of dancers from different communities circle the biggest town square, site of the Municipality and the town Cathedral, several times. Children, men and women have different days assigned to perform the dance. Men's day sometimes degenerates into altercations between various indigenous communities in the area, and is often seen as once a year opportunity for "settling scores", while women's occasional fights are playful and not intended to harm. The indigenous communities, mestizo majority population and the group of expats co-exist uneventfully throughout the rest of the year. The ritual is a temporary enactment of social upheaval via the symbolic storming of the city, remembering ancient rivalries - so ancient, that in fact nobody can tell how exactly did they start.

Distinctive black leather hats for the fiesta are worn by some male participants during the ceremonies and the parade. The San Juan hats have greatly exaggerated, stiff and circular flat brims that extend over the shoulders and crowns that are high, square, and pointed, bearing many types of symbols. Perhaps intentionally, the design also serves to protect wearers from the rocks. Sometimes intervention by police is required if the participants become too rowdy. In the last years the safety of the participants and onlookers greatly improved, due to the careful scheduling and monitoring of the arrival of dancers from different communities to town.

== Tourism ==
Cotacachi is popular with tourists because of its proximity with Otavalo and also because of the second most famous crater lake in Ecuador, Cuicocha (Guinea Pig Lake). Located 10 minutes by taxi from Cotacachi, Cuicocha is popular with hikers and small boats ply the lake.
