= Scacchi =

Scacchi (pronounced [ˈskakki]) is an Italian surname from scalco ("servant, shalk"), a word derived from Old High German skalk or Gothic 𐍃𐌺𐌰𐌻𐌺𐍃 (skalks). Notable people with the surname include:

- Arcangelo Scacchi (1810–1893), Italian mineralogist
- Greta Scacchi (born 1960), Italian-British-Australian actress
- Marcia Scacchi (born 1982), Argentine volleyball player
- Marco Scacchi (c. 1600–1662), Italian composer and music theorist

== See also ==
- Chess, translating to Italian as scacchi
- Scacchi e tarocchi, a 1985 album by Francesco De Gregori
- Scacco
