= Pimampiro =

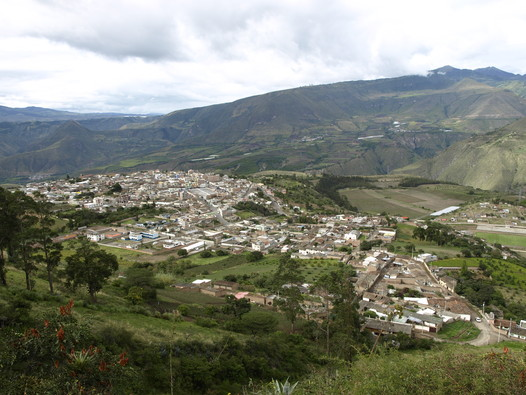

- Location within Ecuador
- Coordinates: 0°23′27″N 77°56′21″W
- Country: Ecuador
- Province: Imbabura
- Canton: Pimampiro

Area
  - Total: 1.44 km^{2} (0.56 sq mi)

Population (2022 census)
  - Total: 5,848
  - Density: 4,060/km^{2} (10,500/sq mi)
- Climate: Cfb

Pimampiro, also Pimampiru, is the seat of Pimampiro Canton, Imbabura Province, Ecuador. The town is located at an elevation of 2,163 metres (7,096 ft). It had a population of 4,654 in the 2001 census and 5,138 in 2010.

The town of Pimampiro is located about 21 kilometres (13 mi) east of Ibarra the capital city of Imbabura province.
