= La Esperanza, Ecuador =

Rural parish of Imbabura Province in Ecuador

Coordinates: 0°18′18″N 78°07′23″W

La Esperanza (the name is Spanish for "hope") is a town and parish in northern Ecuador in Imbabura Province, Ibarra Canton. It lies at the north-eastern foot of Mount Imbabura volcano about 7 kilometres (4.3 mi) in straight line distance south of the city of Ibarra.

La Esperanza parish had a population of 6,677 in the 2001 census and 7,363 in the 2010 census. The town has an elevation of 2,448 metres (8,031 ft) above sea level.

In the late 1960s and 1970s, La Esperanza became known to hippies and celebrities for the magic mushrooms which grew there in profusion.
