= San Miguel de Urcuquí Canton =

Coordinates: 0°31′12″N 78°12′00″W

- Canton
- Location of Imbabura Province in Ecuador.

- Cantons of Imbabura Province
- Country: Ecuador
- Province: Imbabura Province

Area
  - Total: 735.3 km^{2} (283.9 sq mi)

Population (2022 census)
  - Total: 17,969
  - Density: 24.44/km^{2} (63.29/sq mi)
- Time zone: UTC-5 (ECT)

San Miguel de Urcuquí Canton, or Urkuki, is a canton of Ecuador, located in the Imbabura Province. Its seat is the town of Urcuquí. Its population in the 2001 census was 14,381 and was 15,671 in the 2010 census. The area of the canton is 735.3 square kilometres (283.9 sq mi).

San Miguel de Urcuquí is located in the Andes of northern Ecuador. The town and parish of Urcuqui had a population of 4,499 in 2000 and 5,205 in 2010 and has an elevation of 2,295 metres (7,530 ft) above sea level. The town is located about 9 kilometres (5.6 mi) in straight line distance northwest of the city of Ibarra, the capital of Imbabura province.

== Demographics ==
Ethnic groups as of the Ecuadorian census of 2010:

- Mestizo 83.1%
- Afro-Ecuadorian 9.3%
- Indigenous 5.5%
- White 1.9%
- Montubio 0.2%
- Other 0.1%
