= Otavalo =

Otavalo may refer to:

- Otavalo (city), Ecuador
- Otavalo Canton, Ecuador
- Otavalo people, indigenous people in northern Ecuador
- Otavalo Valley in the Ecuadorian Andes near the Cuicocha caldera
