= Pimampiro Canton =

- Canton
- Flag

- Location of Imbabura Province in Ecuador.

- Cantons of Imbabura Province
- Coordinates: 0°24′0″N 77°58′12″W
- Country: Ecuador
- Province: Imbabura Province
- Capital: Pimampiro

Area
  - Total: 438.9 km^{2} (169.5 sq mi)

Population (2022 census)
  - Total: 13,366
  - Density: 30.45/km^{2} (78.87/sq mi)
- Time zone: UTC-5 (ECT)

Pimampiro Canton is a canton of Ecuador, located in Imbabura Province. Its population in the 2001 census was 12,951 and 12,970 in the 2010 census.

Pimampiro is located in the Andes of northern Ecuador. Its capital is the town of Pimampiro which has an elevation of 2,163 metres (7,096 ft) above sea level. Pimampiro has an area of 437 square kilometres (169 sq mi).

== Demographics ==
Ethnic groups as of the Ecuadorian census of 2010:

- Mestizo 73.4%
- Indigenous 13.5%
- Afro-Ecuadorian 10.2%
- White 2.6%
- Montubio 0.2%
- Other 0.1%
