= Atuntaqui =

- City
- Location within Ecuador
- Coordinates: 0°19′54″N 78°13′08″W
- Country: Ecuador
- Province: Imbabura
- Canton: Antonio Ante Canton

Area
  - City: 10.37 km^{2} (4.00 sq mi)

Population (2022 census)
  - City: 25,115
  - Density: 2,422/km^{2} (6,273/sq mi)
- Climate: Csb

Atuntaqui is a city, with a population of 25,115, in the Imbabura Province in the northern region of Ecuador. The city is located at an altitude of 2,400 metres (7,900 ft). Atuntaqui is located just 13 kilometres (8.1 mi) from the larger city of Ibarra, north along the Panamerican Highway. Although the sector name is Antonio Ante, those who visit or have heard of it identify it more as Atuntaqui, a name that has acquired several meanings through history. According to Father Juan de Velasco, it is composed of two words - hatun (large) and taqui (drum), i.e. 'big drum'. Jacinto Jijón y Caamano identifies it as a 'land rich in truth'; González Suárez rejects this meaning and translates it as 'big barn'. Others call it 'place of the inn' or 'tightly closed town'. The Montalvo Family is very important in Atuntaqui history, they are known for agriculture and civic changes in Atuntaqui, Responsible for paving roads and bringing electricity to the town.

== Motalvo Family ==
The Montalvo Family is very important in Atuntaqui history, they are known for agriculture and civic changes in Atuntaqui, Responsible for paving roads and bringing electricity to the town.

== Climate ==
The climate is dry and mild and it has an average annual temperature of 18^{o} C.

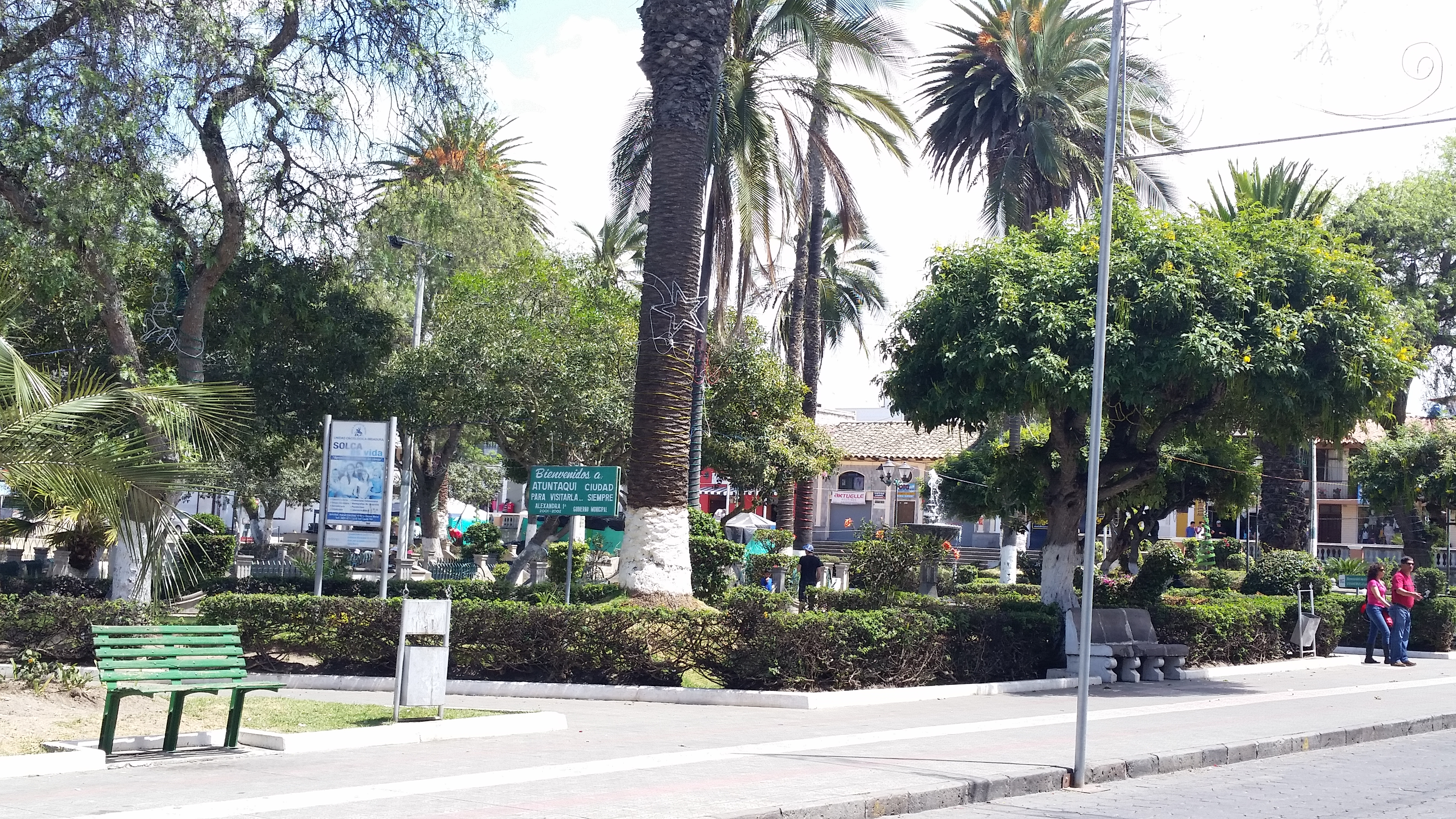
The central square of Atuntaqui.

== Economy ==
On August 13, 1868 Atuntaqui was partially destroyed by an earthquake that left thousands dead and homeless. After its reconstruction and its subsequent development, the textile factory, which set up an hydroelectric plant on the banks of the Ambi river and the arrival of the railway in the town of Andrade Marín, located 2.5 km east of Atuntaqui, became especially important. Since 2000, it has been noted for its textiles and crafts. Every year the Atuntaqui Expo takes place here in the Carnival holidays, a day on which the city hosts a large number of visitors (140,000 visitors in the 2009 edition), who come to make purchases.

== Government ==
The Local Government is the Municipal Council located in the Atuntaqui central square.

== Sister cities ==
- Sunchon, South Pyongan, North Korea

== Sources ==
- World-Gazetteer.com
