= Cuicocha =

Lake in Ecuador

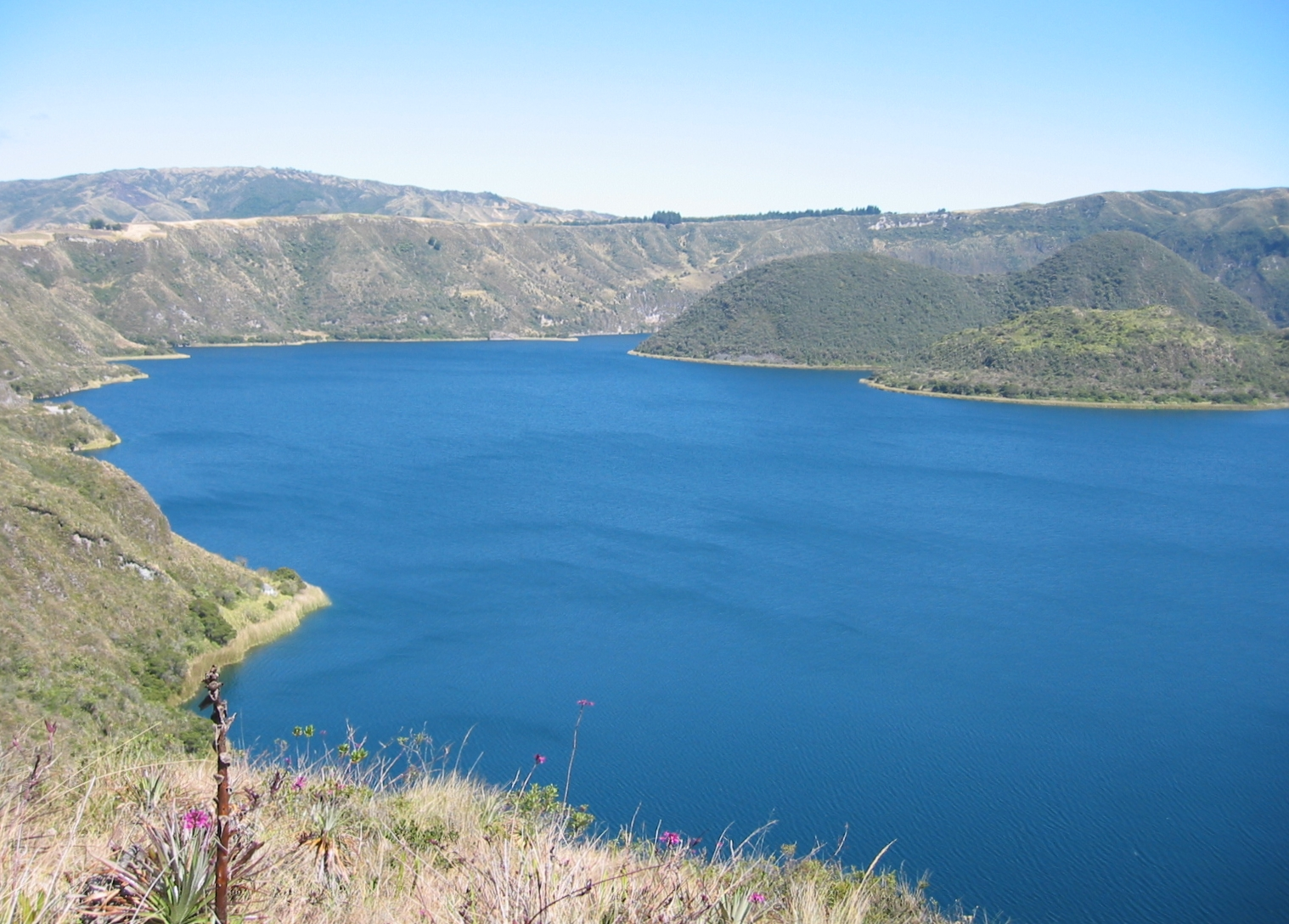
- The Cuicocha crater lake seen from the caldera rim.

Highest point
- Elevation: 3,246 m (10,650 ft)
- Coordinates: 0°18′N 78°21′W

Geography
- Location: Imbabura Province, Ecuador
- Parent range: Cordillera Occidental, Andes

Geology
- Mountain type: Inactive caldera
- Last eruption: c. 650 CE

Cuicocha (Kichwa: Kuykucha 'lake of guinea pigs' or Kuychikucha 'rainbow lake') is a 3 km (1.9 mi) wide caldera and crater lake at the foot of Cotacachi Volcano in the Cordillera Occidental of the Ecuadorian Andes.

Its name comes from the Kichwa indigenous language and means "Lago del Cuy" or Guinea Pig Lake in English. It was given this name due to the guinea pig shape of the largest Island in the middle of the laguna. These animals play a significant part in the everyday life of Ecuadorians, as they reproduce rapidly and need a minimum of food and care to survive. They make for a high protein meal especially for populations living in high altitude.

The caldera was created by a massive eruption about 3100 years ago that generated about 5 cubic kilometres (6.54 billion cubic yards) of pyroclastic flow and covered the surrounding area in volcanic ash up to 20 cm (8 inches) deep. Activity continued until 650 CE. In combination with other eruptions from nearby Imbabura, Mojanda, Cotacachi, and Cayambe, Cuicocha is responsible for the fertile soil of the Otavalo Valley.

Cuicocha lake, a crater lake within the Cuicocha caldera contains four dacitic lava domes which form two steep forested islands: Yerovi, the smaller, and Teodoro Wolf, the larger. People are prohibited on both. The rim of the caldera is extremely steep — so steep, in fact, that the accumulation of sediment is insufficient for most hydrophyte vegetation. An older lava dome from the Pleistocene forms part of the eastern rim. The lake, which is 200 m (656 ft) deep at its deepest point, is highly alkaline and contains little life. It has no known outlet.

The intra-caldera islands, on the other hand, support some wildlife, most notably the silvery grebe, which lives around the reeds and feeds on small fish, frogs, crayfish, small water snakes, seeds of water plants, and insects. The bird is found in upper temperate and lower páramo zones throughout the Andes, but little is known about the species. In 1974 a census was taken of the population of grebes at Cuicocha and 44 birds were found.

Cuicocha forms the southern end of the Cotacachi-Cayapas Ecological Reserve. During the second day of Inti Raymi (or Sun Festival) every summer solstice, indigenous shamans use Cuicocha as a bath for ritual cleansing and purification.

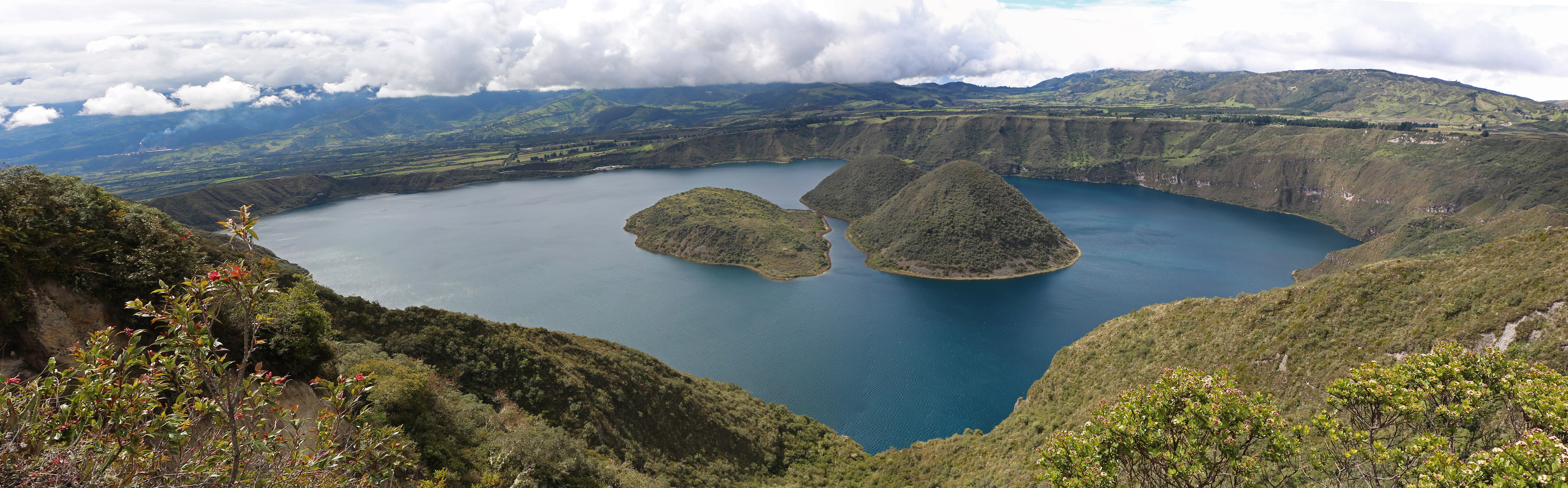
Caldera of Cuicocha

== IUGS geological heritage site ==
In respect of it being a 'volcanic complex with a spectacular 3km wide active volcanic caldera, with many documented records of violent historic eruptions', the International Union of Geological Sciences (IUGS) included 'The Cotacachi - Cuicocha volcanic complex' in its assemblage of 100 'geological heritage sites' around the world in a listing published in October 2022. The organisation defines an IUGS Geological Heritage Site as 'a key place with geological elements and/or processes of international scientific relevance, used as a reference, and/or with a substantial contribution to the development of geological sciences through history.'

== Climate ==
Climate data for Sigsicunga, elevation 3,111 m (10,207 ft), (1961–1990)
| Month | Jan | Feb | Mar | Apr | May | Jun | Jul | Aug | Sep | Oct | Nov | Dec | Year |
|---|---|---|---|---|---|---|---|---|---|---|---|---|---|
| Mean daily maximum °C (°F) | 14.6 (58.3) | 14.6 (58.3) | 14.3 (57.7) | 14.3 (57.7) | 14.8 (58.6) | 14.1 (57.4) | 14.1 (57.4) | 14.6 (58.3) | 15.3 (59.5) | 15.1 (59.2) | 14.6 (58.3) | 14.8 (58.6) | 14.6 (58.3) |
| Mean daily minimum °C (°F) | 5.8 (42.4) | 5.9 (42.6) | 5.8 (42.4) | 6.1 (43.0) | 6.1 (43.0) | 5.5 (41.9) | 5.0 (41.0) | 5.0 (41.0) | 5.4 (41.7) | 5.8 (42.4) | 5.5 (41.9) | 5.6 (42.1) | 5.6 (42.1) |
| Average precipitation mm (inches) | 93.0 (3.66) | 78.0 (3.07) | 106.0 (4.17) | 119.0 (4.69) | 60.0 (2.36) | 100.0 (3.94) | 106.0 (4.17) | 71.0 (2.80) | 61.0 (2.40) | 84.0 (3.31) | 113.0 (4.45) | 72.0 (2.83) | 1,063 (41.85) |
Source: FAO

== See also ==
- List of volcanoes in Ecuador
- The best tour to Cuicocha Lagoon
