= Gustavo Pareja =

Ecuadorian politician

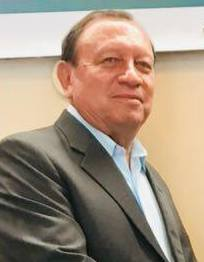

Mayor of Otavalo
- In office 16 May 2014 – 14 May 2019
- Preceded by: Mario Conejo
- Succeeded by: Mario Conejo

8th Provincial Prefect of Imbabura Province
- In office 1997–2009
- Preceded by: Luis Mejía Montesdeoca
- Succeeded by: Washington Barreno

Personal details
- Born: Gustavo Pareja Cisneros; 10 January 1947 (age 79) Otavalo, Imbabura Province, Ecuador
- Party: Constructive Movement Party (since 2020)
- Other political affiliations: Avanza Party (2014–2020); PRIAN Party (2004–2014); Democratic Left (before 2004)
- Education: Central University of Ecuador

Gustavo Pareja Cisneros (born 10 January 1947) is an Ecuadorian politician. He was the Mayor of Otavalo upon defeating the incumbent Mario Conejo in the 2014 mayoral election. He won the election with 10% more votes than Conejo. Previously, he served as the 8th Provincial Prefect of Imbabura Province from 1997 through 2009.

During his tenure as mayor, Pareja Cisneros stressed the urbanization and modernization of Otavalo such as the establishment of national parks, commercializing the region and expanding transportation across the city. He decided not to run for re-election in 2019 and instead unsuccessfully ran for a seat in the Nation Assembly in Otavalo.

== Early life ==
Pareja Cisneros was born on 10 January 1947 in Otavalo in the Imbabura Province. His father was a carpenter and his mother was a housewife. He studied at the Central University of Ecuador, where he majored in political science and sociology.

Cisneros was elected to a minor political post in the Imbabura Province during the 1994 sectional elections as a member of the Democratic Left.

== Provincial Prefect of Imbabura Province (1997–2009) ==
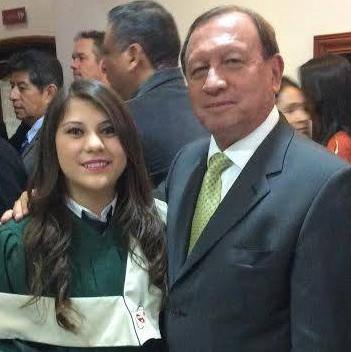
Pareja Cisneros with his daughter, February 2014

In 1997, Cisneros became the Provincial Prefect of Imbabura Province replacing the outgoing Luis Mejía Montesdeoca. His administration focused on infrastructure improvement, creating a stronger athletic program, and building better relationships with citizens.

During the 2000 elections, Cisneros was re-elected. However, in 2003, his approval ratings began to drop due to strong conservative opposition in Imbabura.

Surprisingly, in the 2004 elections, he was re-elected as Provincial Prefect as a member of the Institutional Renewal Party of National Action under the influence of Álvaro Noboa.

Cisneros was not a candidate in the 2009 elections for Provincial Prefect. Instead, he focused on his candidacy for Mayor of Otavalo.

== Mayor of Otavalo (2014–2019) ==
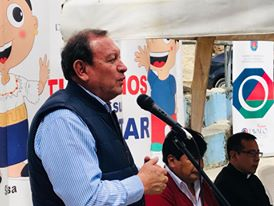
Pareja Cisneros at a July 2018 rally in Otavalo

For the 2009 political sectional elections, Pareja Cisneros announced his intentions to run as Mayor of Otavalo, but was narrowly defeated by Mario Conejo. He refused to rule out a second bid, so in the 2014 sectional elections, he announced his candidacy for Mayor of Otavalo once again. Pareja Cisneros ended up defeating the incumbent Conejo by a margin on 10% of the vote. He was sworn-in as Mayor on 16 May 2014.

During his tenure as mayor, Cisneros sought to urbanize Otavalo and to expand the cities commercial centers. In a 2018 interview, Cisneros confirmed plans to expand the cities stadiums under the projected cost of US$1,400,000 and viewed the expansion as "nearly impossible, but doable". Cisneros also called for an expansion of the automobile industry in Otavalo and for the modernization of airports in nearby Otavalo. A critic of animal shelters, Pareja Cisneros signed legislation that would increase maintenance while promoting humane methods to shelter and capture stray animals in Otavalo.

In the 2017 general election, Cisneros endorsed Guillermo Lasso's bid for the presidency. When Vice President of Ecuador Lenín Moreno won the election, Cisneros worked with the President-elect to bring "dialogue of peace to the nation" while stressing the importance of urbanizing the nation such as the inclusion of national parks.

In July 2018, Cisneros criticized his predecessor Conejo saying he "let down the citizens of Otavalo" with accusations of corruption.

Pareja Cisneros opted from running for re-election and left office in May 2019.

== Post-mayoralty ==
During the 2021 elections, he unsuccessfully ran for a seat in the National Assembly as a member of the newly founded party the Constructive Movement Party.
