= Ibarra Canton =

- Canton
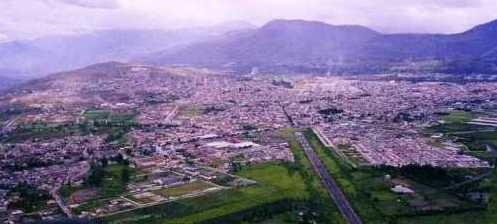
- Ibarra

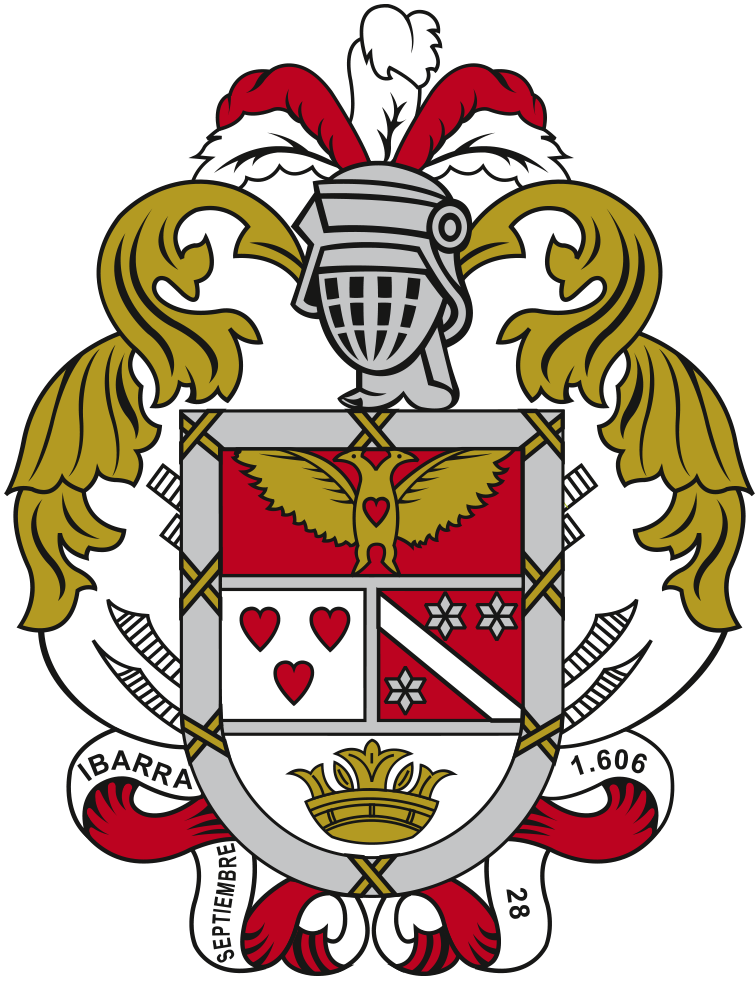
- Seal

- Location of Imbabura Province in Ecuador.

- Cantons of Imbabura Province
- Coordinates: 0°21′45.64″N 78°07′50.40″W
- Country: Ecuador
- Province: Imbabura Province
- Capital: Ibarra

Area
  - Total: 1,137 km^{2} (439 sq mi)

Population (2022 census)
  - Total: 217,469
  - Density: 191.3/km^{2} (495.4/sq mi)
- Time zone: UTC-5 (ECT)

Ibarra Canton is a canton of Ecuador, located in Imbabura Province. Its capital is the town of Ibarra. Its population in the 2001 census was 153,256 and 181,175 in the 2010 census. The area of the canton is 1,137 square kilometres (439 sq mi).

Ibarra is located in the Andes region of northern Ecuador. The capital city is situated at an altitude of 2,225 metres (7,300 ft) above sea level.

The canton is divided into seven parishes: Ambuquí (Ampuki), Angochagua (Ankuchawa), Carolina (Karulina), La Esperanza, Lita, Salinas, San Antonio de Ibarra.

== Demographics ==
Ethnic groups as of the Ecuadorian census of 2010:

- Mestizo 78.2%
- Indigenous 8.8%
- Afro-Ecuadorian 8.7%
- White 3.8%
- Montubio 0.3%
- Other 0.2%

== See also ==
- Inca-Caranqui, archaeological site
- La Esperanza, Ecuador
- Yawarkucha
