= Andrea Scacco =

Ecuadorian politician

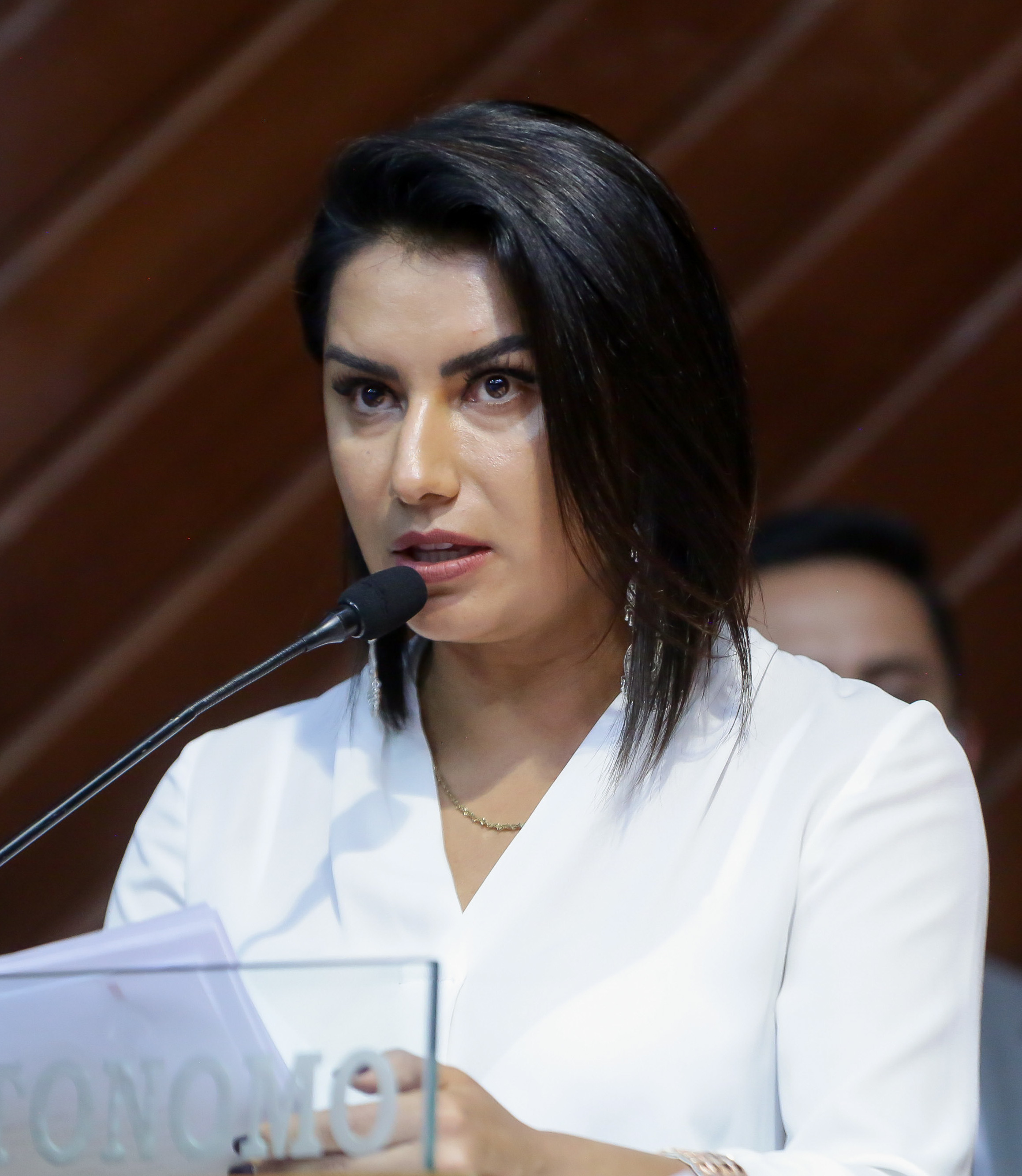
- Born: July 8, 1986 (age 40); Ibarra, Ecuador
- Occupation: Politician

Andrea Elizabeth Scacco Carrasco (born July 8, 1986) is an Ecuadorian politician who served as Mayor of Ibarra.

== Biography ==
She began her political career in 2007 as a councilwoman for Ibarra representing the Social Christian Party, and was subsequently elected for two more terms, in the 2009 and 2014 elections. In the latter election, she ran for the Avanza party and received the most votes of any councilwoman. She served as vice-mayor of Ibarra from 2014 to 2015.

In 2015, he left the Avanza party after claiming to have found irregularities in the administration of the then-mayor of Ibarra, Álvaro Castillo Aguirre, who belonged to the same party. Scacco also described Castillo's actions as unethical.

In April 2016, he reported being the victim of extortion for cooperating with the justice system in a corruption case in the municipality. Two people involved in the incident were arrested by the police.

A native of Ibarra, Scacco was elected to be its new mayor in March 2019 hoping to reduce xenophobia and to create a women's refuge in the city.

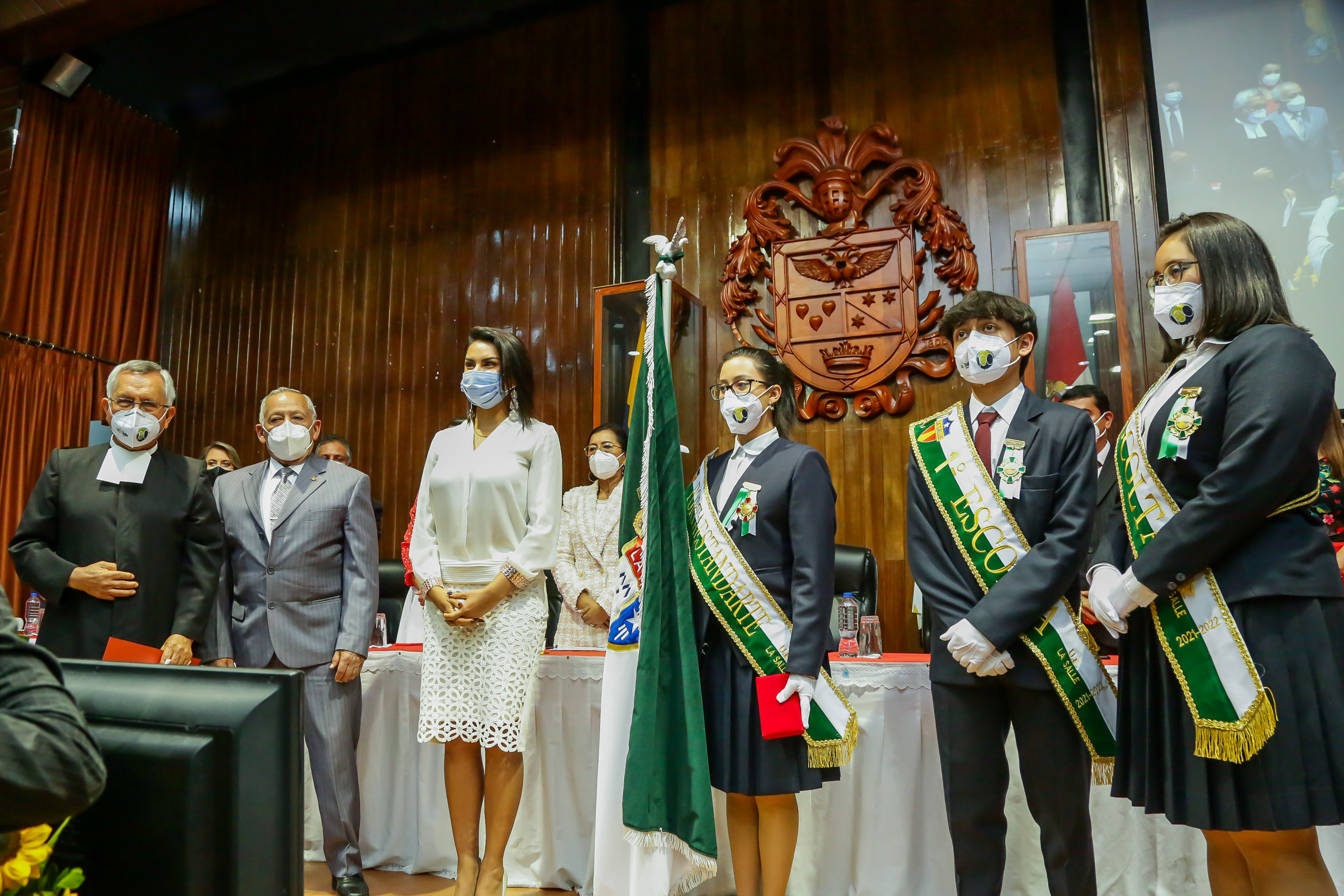
Celebrating 415 years of Ibarra in 2021

During her administration plans started to create a new cemetery in the parish of Guayaquil de Alpachaca. This was required because the city's municipal cemetery was full. Scacco noted that the cemetery would not be completed until the next administration.

In 2022 an allegation was made that she had been involved in the sale of a job in her administration. It was alleged that her mother had said that the person who got the job (but who was later fired) had spoken of returning money to the employee.

Her achievements by 2023 included the paving of six roads, new classrooms and the creation of a sewer.
