= ENAMI (Ecuador) =

Ecuadorian state-owned mining company

Empresa Nacional Minera
- Company type: Public company
- Industry: Mining
- Founded: 2010; 16 years ago
- Founder: Government of Ecuador
- Headquarters: Quito, Ecuador

Empresa Nacional Minera (ENAMI EP) is an Ecuadorian state-owned mining company based in Quito. It was created in 2010 by a decree signed by the President of Ecuador, Rafael Correa.

ENAMI operates the Rio Santiago and the Pacto gold mines; and has a partnership with the Chilean company Codelco to develop several copper deposits. The Junin deposit, located in the Intag region, was previously explored by Mitsubishi and Canada's Ascendant Copper Corp. Ascendant lost its concession due to questions about the legality of its claims and opposition from local residents.

According to Rainforest Rescue, ENAMI plans to exploit copper reserves in rainforests.
