= Imbabura Volcano =

Inactive stratovolcano in Imbabura Province, Ecuador

Imbabura
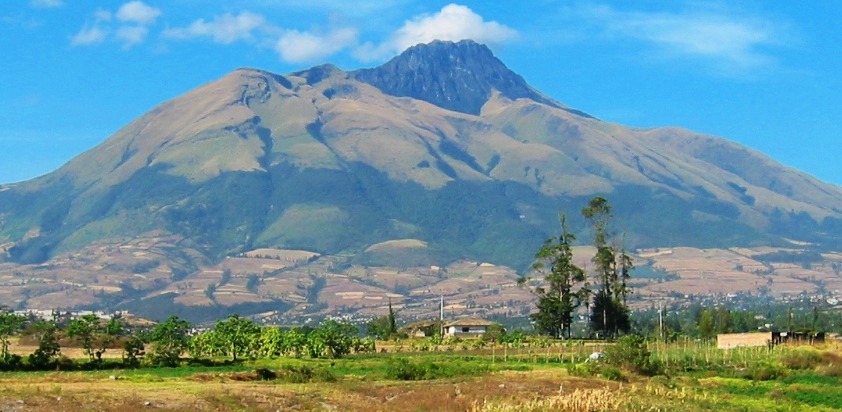
- Imbabura, with corn fields in the foreground.

Highest point
- Elevation: 4,609 m (15,121 ft)
- Prominence: 1,519 m (4,984 ft)
- Listing: Ultra
- Coordinates: 0°15′29″N 78°10′47″W

Geography
- Location within Ecuador
- Location: Imbabura Province, Ecuador
- Parent range: Andes

Geology
- Mountain type: Inactive stratovolcano
- Last eruption: 5550 BCE ± 500 years

Imbabura is an inactive stratovolcano in northern Ecuador. Although it has not erupted for about 7,500 years, it is not thought to be extinct. Imbabura is intermittently capped with snow and has no permanent glaciers.

Covered in volcanic ash, the slopes of Imbabura are especially fertile. In addition to cloud forests, which are found across the northern Andes to an altitude of 3000 m, the land around Imbabura is extensively farmed. Maize, sugarcane, and beans are all staple crops of the region. Cattle are also an important commodity, and much of the land on and around Imbabura, especially the high-altitude meadows above the tree line, is used for grazing.

== Geography and geology ==
Imbabura is a volcano in the southern Ring of Fire. As the Nazca Plate is subducted beneath the South American Plate, the former melts with exposure to the hotter asthenosphere. This melted rock, which is less dense than the crust above it, rises to the surface. The result is an arc of volcanoes, which includes Imbabura, 100–300 km away from the subduction zone.

Imbabura is the product of Strombolian Eruptions, which, in comparison to Plinian Eruptions, are relatively low-intensity and low volume. They are generally characterized by the ejection of cinders, lapilli, and lava bombs, as well as the accumulation of dark tephra around the volcanic vent. This forms a cinder cone. Imbabura's cone is relatively exposed from erosion and easy to identify.

In fact, the mountain is a complex of cinder cones with varying heights. Many of them are named, including el Cubilche, Azaya (or Huarmi Imbabura), Pangaladera, Cunrru, Artezón, Zapallo Loma, Angaraloma, and Araque.

Imbabura was active during the late Pleistocene and early Holocene epochs, for the last time approximately 14,000 years ago. Future pyroclastic flows from any of Imbabura's cones could pose a serious threat, however. From the Azaya cone, which faces West, pyroclastic flows could hit the San Pablo lake at the base of the mountain and generate devastating waves; from the Artesón cone, which faces north, pyroclastic flows could strike the city of Ibarra, with a population of nearly 300,000. For this reason, Imbabura remains closely monitored by volcanologists.

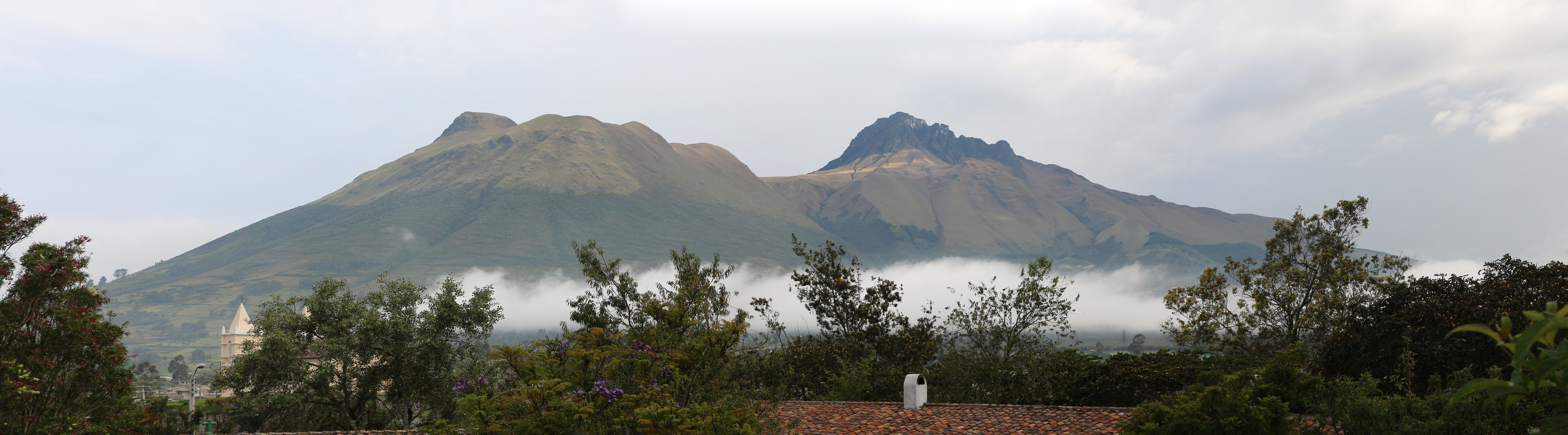
Imbabura Volcano seen from San Pablo del Lago

== Cultural importance ==
As the dominant geographic feature of the area, Imbabura is of significant importance to the local culture, which involves a spiritual relationship with the land. The mountain is sometimes personified locally as Taita Imbabura, or "Papa" Imbabura. In fact, Imbabura is considered the sacred protector of the region.

One of boulders ejected by Imbabura's last eruption, which landed nearby in Peguche, was revered as Achilly Pachacamac, the supreme god, by pre-Incan peoples. According to local legend, Mojanda and Imbabura each hurled stones across the valley; but Imbabura, who is often characterized as a womanizer, was weakened by his amorous affairs, and his rock fell short. The stone has been carved into the shape of a face.

It is said that Imbabura fought with Mojanda to win the love of Cotacachi, who became his wife. When Cotacachi is snowcapped in the morning, it is said that Imbabura has been with her during the night. Building upon these legends, some of the smaller peaks nearby, especially Yanahurca (or Wawa Imbabura) north of Cotacachi, are called the offspring of the two.

When it rains in Otavalo and surrounding areas, it is also said that Imbabura is "peeing" in the valley.

On a western slope, an area of loose earth perfectly resembles a heart. This area, known as the "heart of the mountain" is much beloved by residents and appears in local art depicting the volcano. The area is said to be enchanted, as no human nor animal has been capable of scaling or hiking across the area.

== Climbing ==
Imbabura is most frequently climbed from the town of La Esperanza or where the road ends about 4 km above it in the village of Chirihuasi. From Chirihuasi, the altitude gain is approximately 1,600 metres (5,200 ft). The route follows a ridge and reaches the false northern summit before contouring around the crater to the true summit.

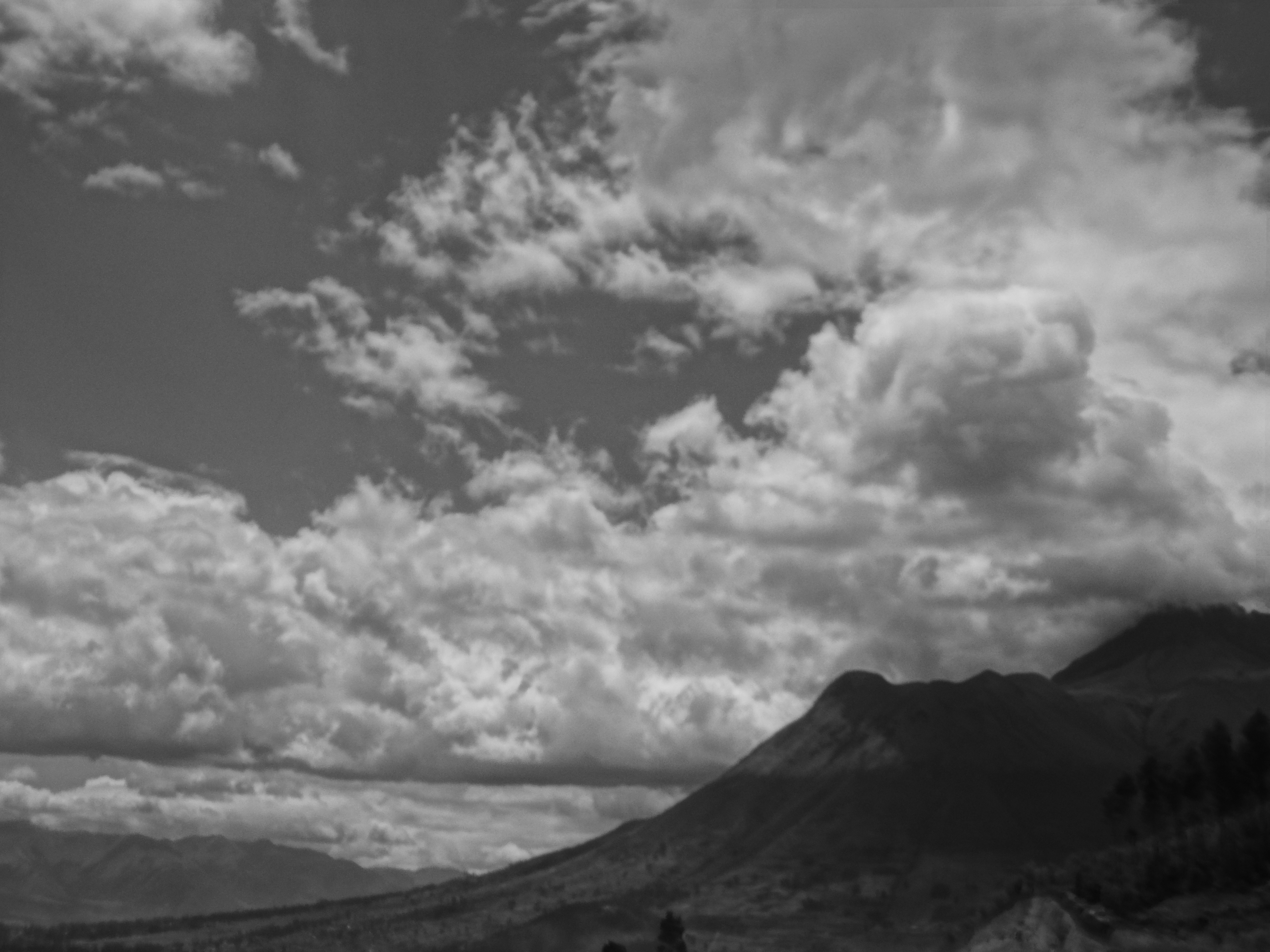
Imbabura Volcano photographed in black and white.

== See also ==
- Media related to Imbabura (Ecuador) at Wikimedia Commons
- List of volcanoes in Ecuador
