= Imbabura Province =

Province of Ecuador

Coordinates: 0°21′N 78°08′W

Imbabura
- Province
- Province of Imbabura
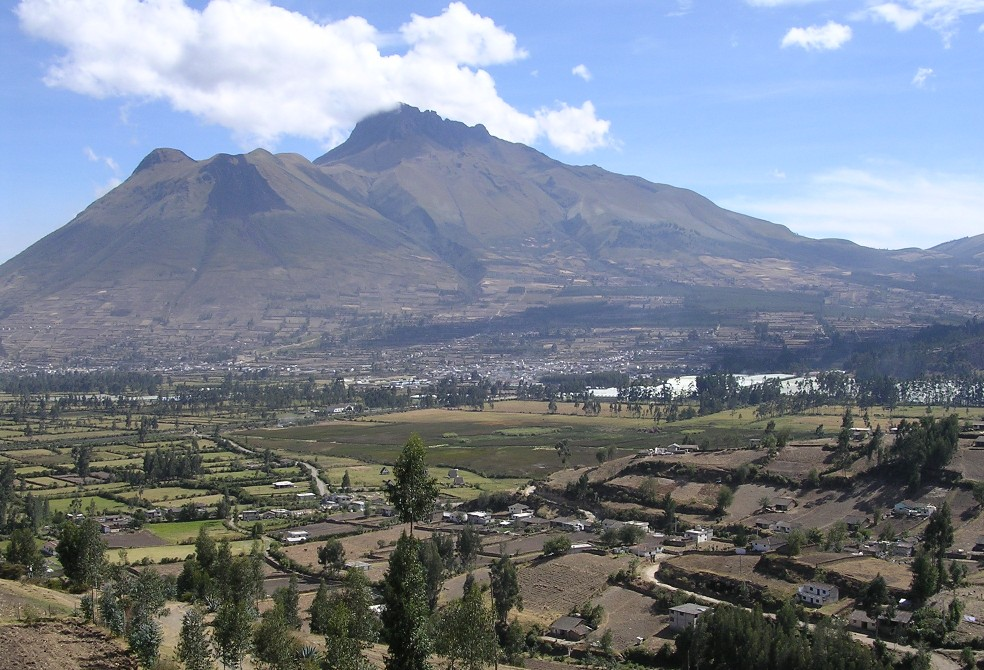
- Mount Imbabura from south-east.

- Flag

- Imbabura Province in Ecuador

- Cantons of Imbabura Province
- Country: Ecuador
- Established as Province: 25 June 1824
- Capital: Ibarra

Government
  - Prefect: Richard Calderón (RC)
  - Governor: Juan Echeverría Penagos

Area
  - Total: 4,785 km^{2} (1,847 sq mi)

Population (2022 census)
  - Total: 469,879
  - Density: 98.20/km^{2} (254.3/sq mi)
- Demonym: Imbaburan
- Time zone: ECT
- Vehicle registration: I
- HDI (2017): 0.747 high · 7th

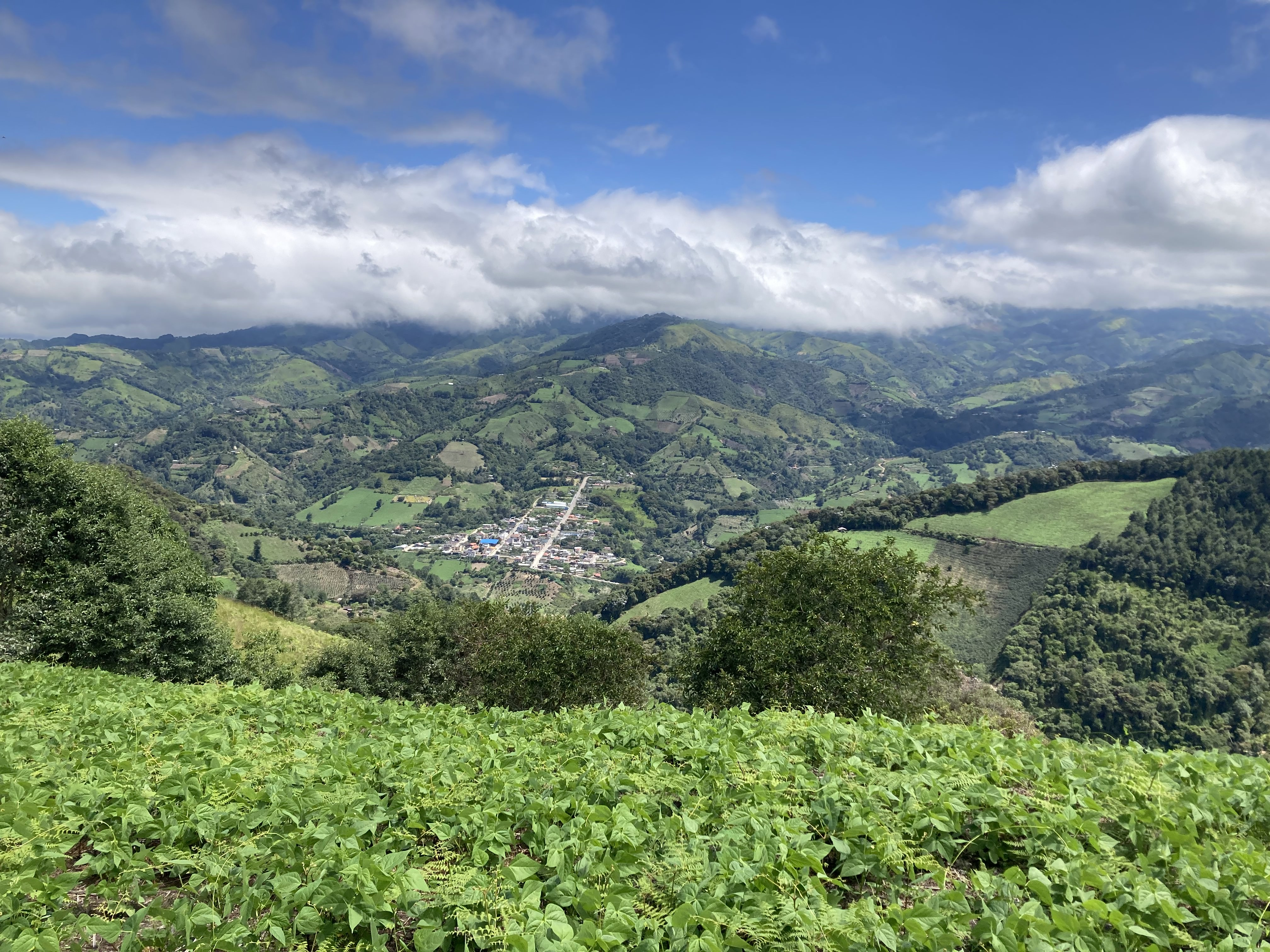
The town of Seis de Julio de Cuellaje as seen from a bean farm.

Imbabura (Spanish pronunciation: [imbaˈβuɾa]) is a province located in the Andes of northern Ecuador. The capital is Ibarra. The people of the province speak Spanish, and a large portion of the population also speak the Imbaburan Kichwa variety of the Quechua language.

The summit of Cotacachi Volcano at an elevation of 4,944 metres (16,220 ft) is 15 kilometres (9.3 mi) north-east of the town of Cotacachi. The volcano is located in the large Cotacachi Cayapas Ecological Reserve.

Imbabura Volcano is also located in the province. Best reached from the town of La Esperanza, the 4,609 metres (15,121 ft) high mountain can be climbed in a single day.

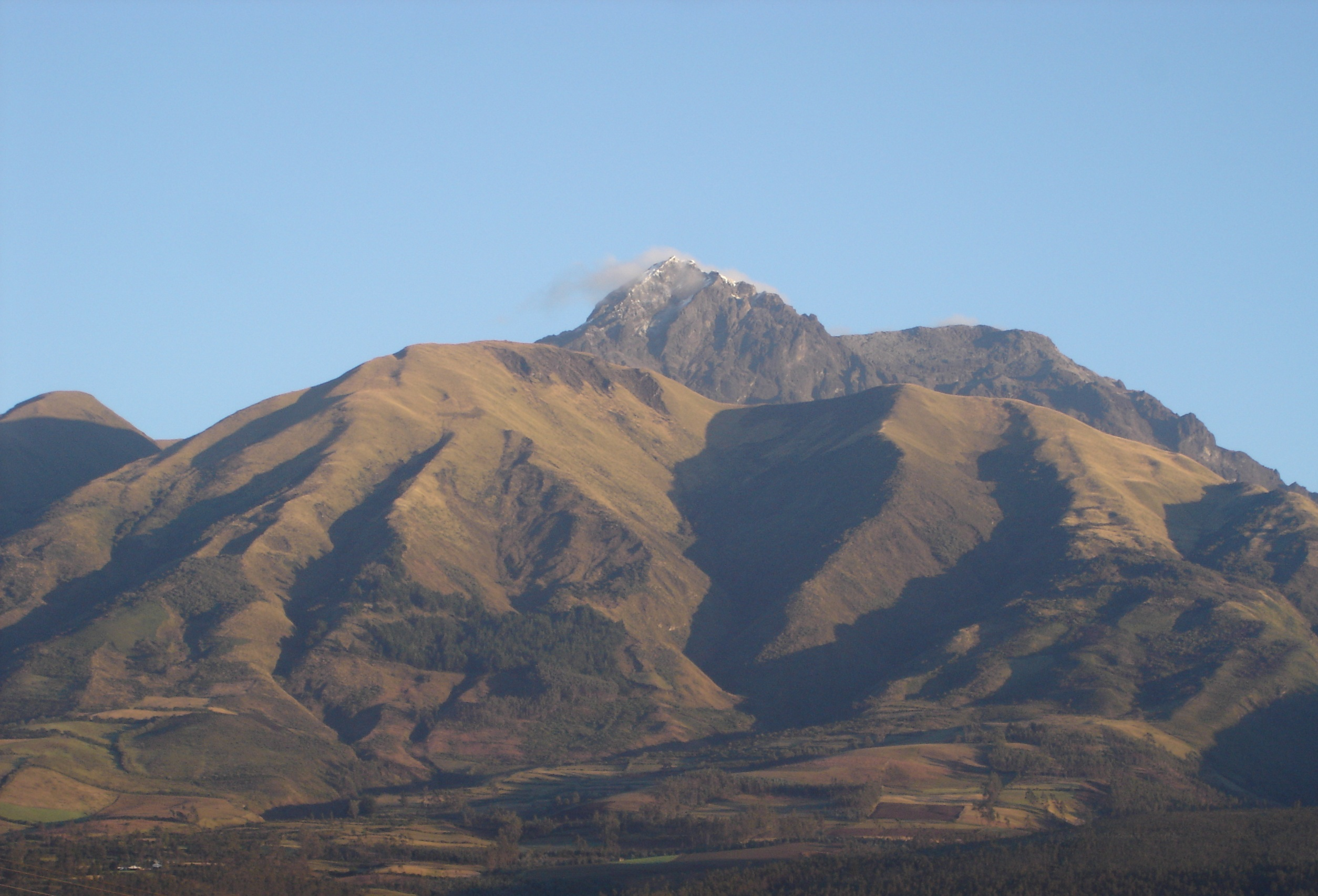
Cotacachi volcano as seen from the town of Cotacachi.

== Cantons ==
The province is divided into six cantons. The following table lists each with its population at the 2001 census and 2010 census. its area in square kilometres (km^{2}), and the name of the cantonal seat or capital.

Canton	Pop. (2001)	Pop. (2010)	Area (km^{2})	Seat/Capital
Antonio Ante	36,053	43,518	81	Atuntaqui
Cotacachi	37,215	40,036	1,726	Cotacachi
Ibarra	153,256	181,175	1,093	Ibarra
Otavalo	90,188	104,874	500	Otavalo
Pimampiro	12,951	12,970	437	Pimampiro
San Miguel de Urcuquí	14,381	15,671	779	Urcuquí

== Today ==
The governor of Imbabura is Paolina Vercoutere Quinche. She was appointed on 17 June 2022.

== Demographics ==
Ethnic groups as of the Ecuadorian census of 2010:

- Mestizo 65.7%
- Indigenous 25.8%
- Afro-Ecuadorian 5.4%
- White 2.7%
- Montubio 0.3%
- Other 0.1%

== See also ==
- Cotacachi Cayapas Ecological Reserve
- Cuicocha
- Inca-Caranqui, archaeological site
- Llurimagua Project
- Provinces of Ecuador
- Cantons of Ecuador
- Gustavo Pareja
