= Cotacachi Volcano =

Dormant volcano in the Ecuadorian Andes

Cotacachi
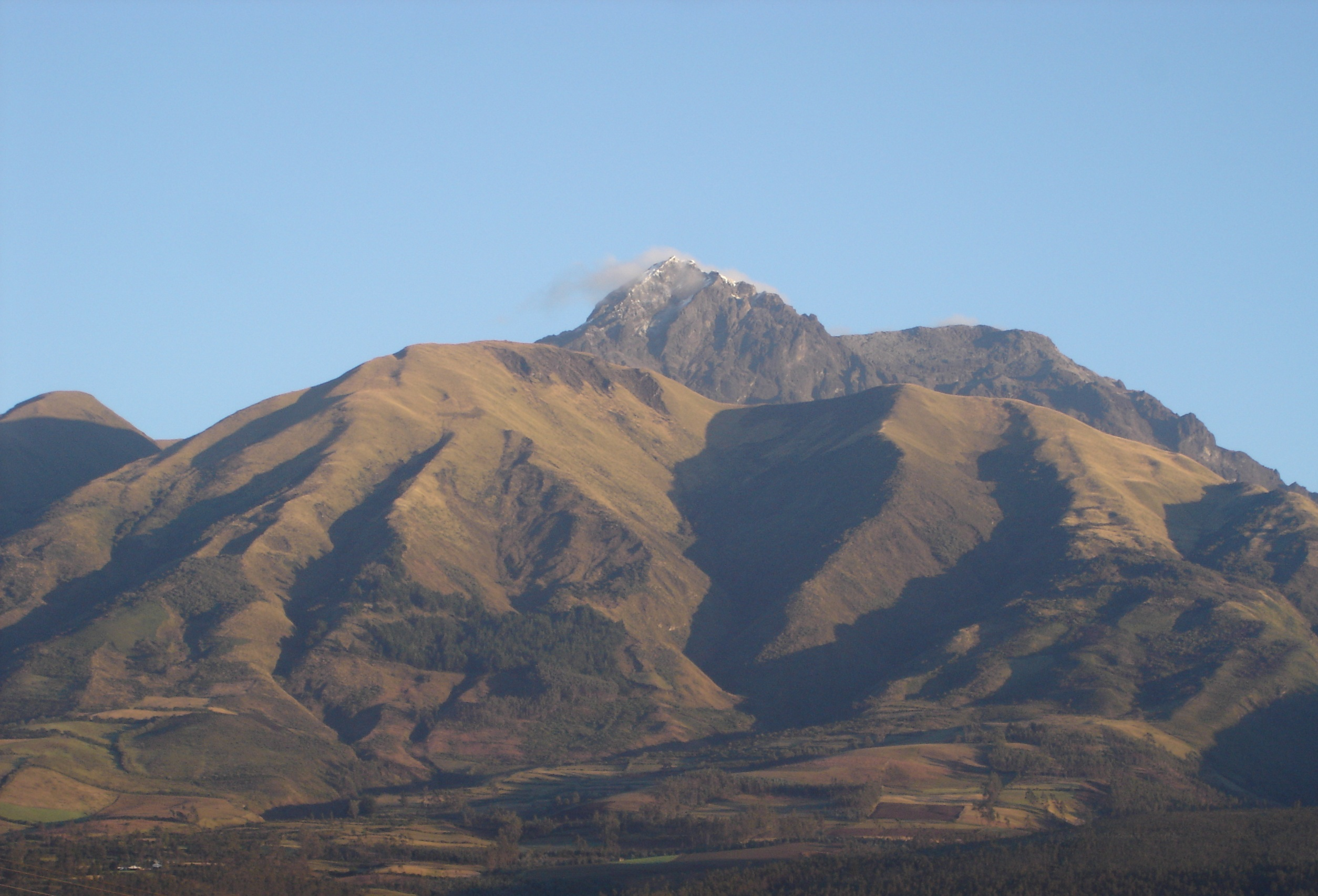
- Cotacachi Volcano as seen from the city of Cotacachi

Highest point
- Elevation: 4,944 m (16,220 ft)
- Prominence: 1,837 m (6,027 ft)
- Listing: Ultra
- Coordinates: 00°21′39″N 78°20′57″W

Geography
- Location within Ecuador
- Location: Ecuador
- Parent range: Andes

Climbing
- First ascent: 24 April 1880 by Edward Whymper, Jean-Antoine Carrel and Louis Carrel

Cotacachi is a dormant volcano in the Western Cordillera of the northern Ecuadorian Andes, in the west of Imbabura Province, above the city of Cotacachi. It has a summit elevation of 4,944 m (16,220 ft) above sea level and its highest elevations are capped with snow.

The summit of Cotacachi is located within the Cotacachi Cayapas Ecological Reserve. It was first climbed on 24 April 1880 by Edward Whymper, Jean-Antoine Carrel and Louis Carrel.

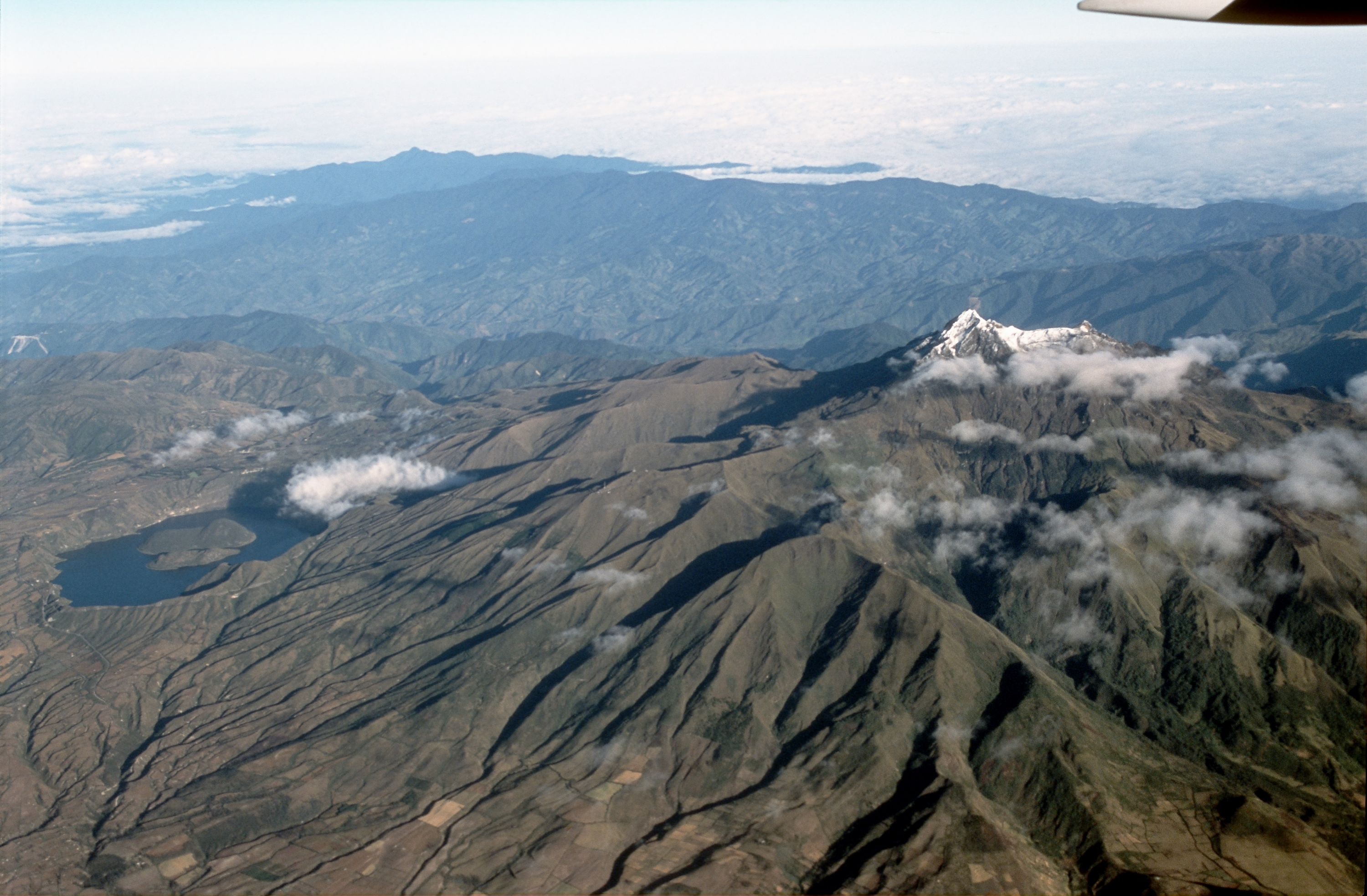
Aerial view of Cotacachi

== See also ==
- Lists of volcanoes
  - List of volcanoes in Ecuador
- List of Ultras of South America
