= Ibarra, Ecuador =

Ibarra
- City
- San Miguel de Ibarra
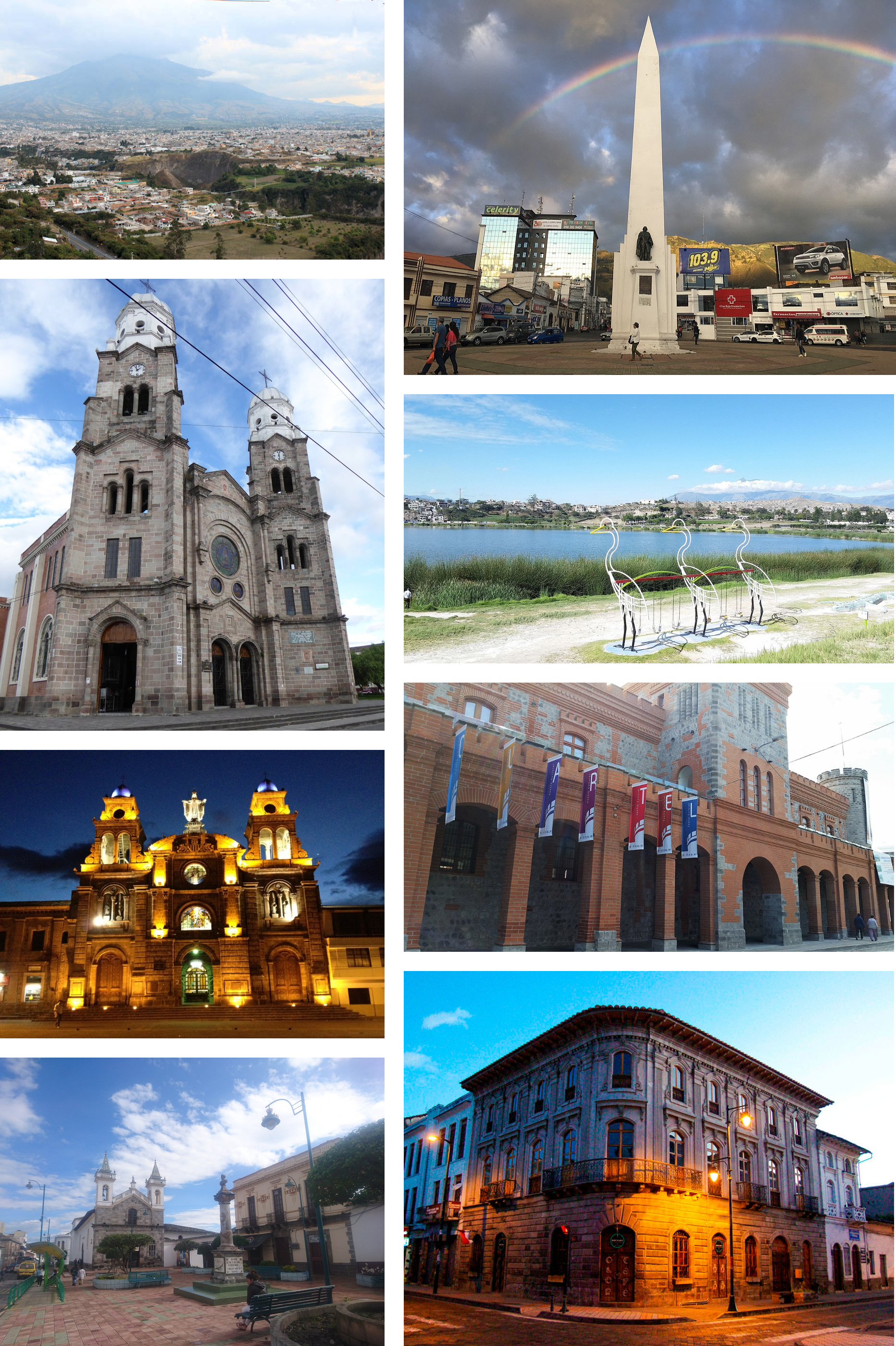
- From top, left to right: View of the city and the Imbabura Volcano, Obelisk of Ibarra, Basilica of Sorrowful Mother, Yahuarcocha lagoon, Basilica of Our Lady of Mercy, El Cuartel Cultural Center, Church and square of Saint Augustine and the House of Iberreñidad.

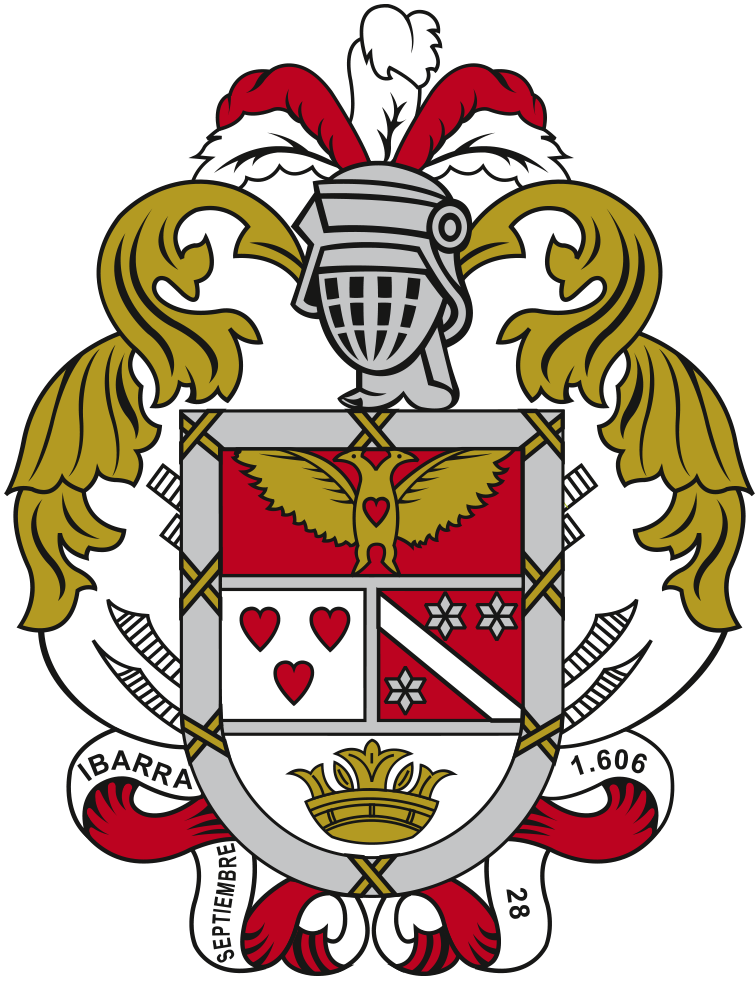
- Coat of arms
- Nickname: La Ciudad Blanca (The White City)
- Location within Ecuador
- Coordinates: 0°21′45.64″N 78°07′50.40″W
- Country: Ecuador
- Province: Imbabura
- Canton: Ibarra Canton
- Founded: 28 September 1606
- Re-founded: 28 April 1872
- Founder: Cristóbal de Troya y Pinque
- Named for: San Miguel de Ibarra
- Parishes: Urban Parishes: Alpachaca; Caranqui; La Dolorosa del Priorato; El Sagrario; San Francisco

Government
  - Mayor: Álvaro Castillo
  - Vice Mayor: Raiza Zamora

Area
  - City: 41.26 km^{2} (15.93 sq mi)
- Elevation: 2,225 m (7,300 ft)

Population (2022 census)
  - City: 157,941
  - Density: 3,828/km^{2} (9,914/sq mi)
- Time zone: UTC-5 (ECT)
- Postal code: EC100150
- Area code: (+593) 6
- Climate: Csb
- Website: www.ibarra.gob.ec (in Spanish)

Ibarra (Spanish pronunciation: [iˈβara]; full name San Miguel de Ibarra; Quechua: Impapura) is a city in northern Ecuador and the capital of the Imbabura Province. It lies at the foot of the Imbabura Volcano and on the left bank of the Tahuando river. It is located about 114 kilometres (71 mi) northeast of Ecuador's capital Quito.

== History ==
Ibarra was founded in 1606 by order of the President of the Royal Audience of Quito, Miguel de Ibarra. The development of the city included the systematic construction of public buildings, including an important number of churches, ⁣⁣but an earthquake in 1868 destroyed most of them. After the devastating earthquake of August 16, 1868, the city was re-settled in 1872. Based on its newest date of foundation, Ibarra is the youngest city in Ecuador. The Inca ruler Atahualpa is said to have been born in the Inca settlement of Inca-Caranqui about 2 km from the city.

Helados de paila (handmade ice cream or sorbet and still sold in the markets today) was first made in Ibarra during Incan times (but not by Incas; by the native indigenous), using snow or ice from the nearby Imbabura Volcano (which is no longer snow bound). Using a large bronze pan surrounded by ice shavings, the juices of various fruits are stirred into the pan to freeze.

== Ibarra today ==
Today, Ibarra is a mid-sized market city rising in popularity with tourists, yet still retains a very authentic Ecuadorian vibe. It has a unique ethnic composition for Ecuador, with the population being a mix of Mestizos, Amerindians (mostly Otavalo people), and Afro-Ecuadorians. Ibarra is known for its mild weather, colonial whitewashed houses (giving it the nickname The White City), and cobbled streets. The Santo Domingo church houses a museum holding paintings. The town is the seat of the Roman Catholic Diocese of Ibarra.

Markets are on Saturdays, and the main festival is the Fiesta de los Lagos, which is held on the last weekend of September. Two colorful parades known as El Pregón and Virgen del Carmen are held on 16 July every year.

Other town attractions are the many restaurants specializing in local cuisine, along with the clubs, discos and a paragliding club.

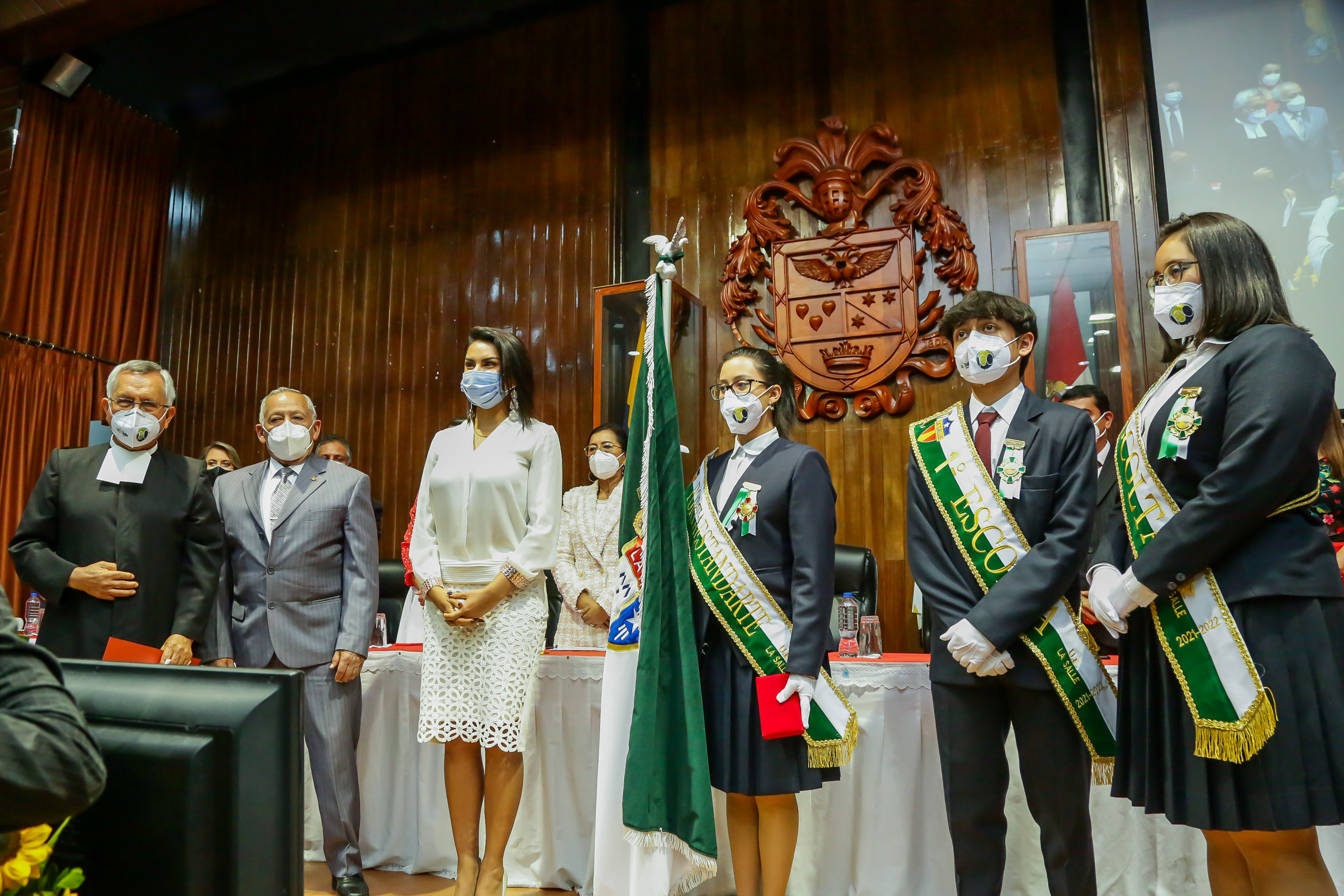
Andrea Scacco leading celebrations of 415 years of Ibarra in 2021

Andrea Scacco was elected to be the new mayor of Ibarra in 2019 planning to reduce xenophobia and to create a women's refuge in the city.

== Climate ==
Ibarra features a warm-summer mediterranean climate (Csb) under the Köppen climate classification. This is possible due to the town's high elevation (7,300 ft) in the Ecuadorian Andes providing cooler temperatures and a seasonal rain-shadow characteristic. The dry/warm season is technically local winter due to the town's location being south of the Intertropical Convergence Zone from June to September. However, since Ibarra is located just north of the equator, this season could be already be classified as summer. The highland climate is mild all year round.

Climate data for Ibarra (Atahualpa Airport), elevation 2,228 m (7,310 ft), (1971–2000)
Month	Jan	Feb	Mar	Apr	May	Jun	Jul	Aug	Sep	Oct	Nov	Dec	Year
Mean daily maximum °C (°F)	21.7 (71.1)	21.6 (70.9)	21.8 (71.2)	21.8 (71.2)	22.1 (71.8)	22.2 (72.0)	22.8 (73.0)	23.1 (73.6)	23.4 (74.1)	22.4 (72.3)	21.8 (71.2)	21.8 (71.2)	22.2 (72.0)
Mean daily minimum °C (°F)	10.9 (51.6)	11.0 (51.8)	11.2 (52.2)	11.6 (52.9)	10.8 (51.4)	10.4 (50.7)	9.8 (49.6)	9.4 (48.9)	9.9 (49.8)	10.8 (51.4)	11.0 (51.8)	11.0 (51.8)	10.7 (51.2)
Average precipitation mm (inches)	30.0 (1.18)	57.0 (2.24)	67.0 (2.64)	84.0 (3.31)	55.0 (2.17)	38.0 (1.50)	18.0 (0.71)	13.0 (0.51)	28.0 (1.10)	79.0 (3.11)	80.0 (3.15)	47.0 (1.85)	596 (23.47)
Average relative humidity (%)	81	82	83	83	81	79	74	73	76	80	84	84	80
Source: FAO

Sister Cities:

- Winchester, Kentucky
- Etawah, Uttar Pradesh, India
