= Kichwa-Lamista people =

Ethnic group in Peru

Kichwa-Lamista
formerly Lamas Runa or Jakwash

Regions with significant populations
- San Martin Province, Peru
- 16,000-24,000 (1989), fewer than 33,331 (2017)

Languages
- Lamas • Kichwa • Spanish

The Kichwa-Lamista or Lamistas are an indigenous people of Peru. They live in the city of Lamas and its associated agricultural communities in the San Martin Region, especially in the Province of Lamas. They speak the Lamas Quechua language, a Northern Quechua language related to the Kichwa language, and have a traditional culture which combines elements of Amazonian, Andean and European origin. The Peruvian government designates all speakers of Kichwa resident in San Martin Department as "Lamistas", but they themselves differentiate between the people of Lamas, Sisa and the Huallaga River.

The ethnogenesis of the Kichwa-Lamistas postdates the conquest of the region by the Spanish, when groups belonging to various Amazonian ethnicities were forcibly settled around the city of Lamas. These groups adopted the Quechua language and largely abandoned their original ethnic identities, although pre-conquest tribal differences would affect the development of a system of lineages among the Lamistas.

The centre of the Kichwa-Lamista culture is the Lamas suburb of Wayku, the nucleus from which the ethnic group migrated to other locations. The Kichwa-Lamistas largely practice Catholicism, alongside indigenous shamanic practices, and their most important celebration is the feast of Santa Rosa Raymi in Lamas.

== Name ==
The name Kichwa-Lamista derives from the element Kichwa, which is the name given to the Quechuan language spoken in Amazonia, and lamista, a Spanish adjective referring to the city of Lamas. The spellings Quechua-Lamista and Kichua-Lamista also exist, with the group themselves preferring spellings which employ k. Writing in 2020, Françoise Barbira Freedman states that the group's preferred endonym is Keshwa Lamas.

The Peruvian government uses the term Lamista to refer to all the Kichwa-speaking population of San Martín Province, but they themselves differentiate between inhabitants of Lamas and those of Sisa and the lower Huallaga River.

Lamistas formerly referred to themselves as Lamas Runa, meaning "People of Lamas", or Jakwash (sometimes spelled Llakwash). Jakwash survives as a term used only in esoteric shamanic contexts. The origin of the name Lamas is obscure, but Pedro Weiss suggested it was likely invented by the Spanish to refer to some detail of the indigenous inhabitants' lifestyle or environment.

== Language ==
The Kichwa-Lamistas speak a Quechuan language which they call Kichwa. Since the 1975 officialisation of Quechua in Peru, Lamas/San Martin Quechua has been one of six regional standard Quechua varieties.

It is likely that the Lamistas acquired Kichwa during the colonial period, and that it was used as a lingua franca between the various ethnicities present in the reductions of Lamas. Quechua was the working language of the Jesuit and Franciscan missions of the region, however, their Quechua was of a simplified and rudimentary nature, and this differs significantly from the grammatical and lexical complexity of Kichwa. Anahí Chaparro suggests that this makes a simple origin in missionary Quechua unlikely.

In the 1940s, Weiss observed that Lamistas refused to learn Spanish, requiring Whites and Mestizos who wished to trade with them to learn Kichwa. In 1975, the Lamistas all spoke "a little Spanish", however, the main language of the community remained Kichwa. Calderon Pacheco, writing in 2000, observed that younger Lamistas spoke Spanish well and that language formed part of a dichotomy held by the Kichwa-Lamista between "savagery" (selvajismo) and "civilisation", with Kichwa associated with the former and Spanish with the latter.

=== Classification of Kichwa ===
There is no agreement among linguists on the affiliation of Lamista Kichwa within the Quechuan language family, although it is often grouped with Quijos-Quichua as part of an Amazonian Quechua group. Parker grouped it with Kichwa spoken in Ecuador, Northern Peru and Colombia, as well as the Quechua of Cajamarca and the variety spoken in Chachapoyas. Torero classified it as part of the QIIB group, closely related to Ecuadorean Quechua but more distant from all other varieties. Cerrón- Palomino largely agreed with Torero, but added Chachapoyas to group QIIB. A 2023 study based on phylogenetic methods split Central Quechua from a single northern and southern group, which was then split into Northern Quechua (Equador, Columbia and Loreto, Peru), Southern Quechua (Ayacucho, Cuzco, Bolivia) and grouped Lamista and Chachapoyas Quechua as a third independent branch.

== Origins ==
The Lamistas believe themselves to be descended from groups of Chanka and Pokra people, who fled from the Inca conquest of their homeland in the central Andes during the 15th century. This tradition is supported by the existence in Lamas of a neighbourhood named Ankohuallo, which carries the name of a Chanka chief defeated by Tupac Yupanqui. However, there is no mention of any association between Lamas and Ankohuallo in the 17th century Chronicles of Céspedes Prieto or in the Jesuit chronicles relating to the region, and several different destinations for the Chanka's flight are mentioned in historical records.

An alternative view, held by modern scholars studying this group, is that the Lamistas originated as a fusion of Amazonian indigenous peoples resident in the reduction of Lamas. After the foundation of the city of Lamas in 1656, six indigenous populations were settled in its vicinity by the Spanish: the Tabalosos, Lamas, Amasifuynes, Cascabosoas, Juamuncos and Payananzos. These groups were later joined by Munichis and Suchichis. In this model, the spread of the Kichwa language originates not in Andean immigration, but in the use of Quechua as a lingua franca by Spanish missionaries. Studies on the blood groups of Lamistas, as well as genetic evidence, indicate that the population is largely of Amazonian origin, supporting this model. Despite this, the beliefs and material culture of the Lamistas are clearly related to those found in the Andean region. This Andean element was likely strengthened by immigration into the territory of highland Quechuas during the post-independence period. Françoise Barbira-Freedman describes them as "a mixed aggregate of forest and Andean people who became constituted as a distinctive ethnic minority".

== History ==
=== The conquest of Lamas ===
The first contact with the Spanish in the region occurred with expeditions from Moyobamba and Chachapoyas in the late 1530s. However, for the next century these contacts were sporadic, and it was not until 1653–1656, that the region was brought under Spanish control by expeditions led by Martin de la Riva Herrera, Corregidor of Cajamarca and Chachapoyas.

Riva's first expedition of 1653 had as its goal the "pacification" of the Mayo and lower Huallaga rivers, and its subsequent use as a staging post to the territory of the Jivaroans, where he believed gold was to be found. During this expedition he met with groups of indigenous people representing six ethnicities (the "six nations of lamas", see above) and received their submission without violence. He founded two settlements on opposite sides of the river Mayo, in the vicinity of present-day Lamas, and left two indigenous caciques, Ojanasta and Majuama, in charge of the settlements. This would facilitate their integration into Colonial society and make possible the collection of tribute in the form of goods and forced labour. During this expedition, Riva made plans to found a city on the hill which is next to the site of present-day Lamas, which he would call San José de Lamas.

The following year, Riva received word that the Indians had burned their settlements and retreated to the forest. Riva returned to the region with an army of 200 men, capturing and publicly hanging Manama and a Suchichi chief in May 1654. He fortified San José de Lamas, and, using it as a base, captured and hanged Ojanasta in November 1654. This marked the conquest of the Tabalosos, Lamas, Amasifuynes, Cascabosoas, Juamuncos and Payananzos, along with some groups of their Suchichi and Munichi allies; and their forced settlement in pueblos de indios under Spanish control.

=== The colonial period: 1656-1826 ===
In 1656, the town of Lamas (officially Ciudad del Triunfo de la Santa Cruz de los Motilones y Lamas) was founded. The conquered indigenous population were forcibly distributed into three villages surrounding the new settlement, which was itself reserved for Spaniards and Criollos, creating the reduction of Lamas. The Indians were designated separated neighbourhoods, known as castas, according to their tribal origins, situated around the new Spanish fort. The indigenous population was split into encomiendas, which were granted to 25 Spanish citizens of Lamas. This imposed an obligation to provide the encomendero with labour and tribute, which in Lamas was typically in the form of cotton, as no other valuable products were cultivated. This system created a situation in which the population of Lamas was in constant debt to the Spanish townspeople, and therefore in a subservient position, a feature of the local economy which persisted into the late 20th century. The encomienda system also required the native population to be indoctrinated into the Catholic faith and prohibited them from leaving the area of the city without permission from the encomendero.

Following their integration into the Spanish system of government, the indigenous population was subject to both European and Andean influence. They were obliged to adopt Andean modes of dress, specifically the cotton clothing which was described as "according to the fashion of the Inca" and the use of a belt called a "chumpi" which became much more complex in its decoration than the original Andean design. They also adopted European cotton-weaving techniques, producing cloth which was distributed by missionaries in zones which lacked a textile industry. The religious instruction of the local population was conducted in Quechua, the Lingua Franca of the Peruvian Amazon used by the Franciscan and Jesuit friars active in the area. According to Francoise Scazzocchio, it is likely that the multi-ethnic population of Lamas adopted Quechua for inter-group communication at this time, and then quickly abandoned their native languages, as occurred in the nearby reductions of Lagunas and Yurimaguas.

During the colonial period, Lamas was at the frontier of the Jesuit missions of Maynas, which extended north as far as modern-day Ecuador, and the Franciscan missions on the Huallaga River. The Jesuit missions were a refuge for indigenous people wanting to escape the exploitative conditions imposed by the Criollos, who frequently conducted hunting expeditions to recapture fugitive Indians. During this period, there were rebellions of the indigenous population around Lamas, which were put down by the Spanish. The Lamistas played an important military role during this period, acting both as paddlers and soldiers in Spanish expeditions against other ethnic groups.

Contact with the Spanish led to a huge death toll due to epidemics and the violence involved in the "pacification" of the natives. During the period between the conquest of Lamas and 1750, Jesuit writers estimated that the indigenous population of the region around Lamas had fallen by four fifths. Further epidemics in the mid-to-late 18th century, along with the expulsion of the Jesuits and Portuguese slave raids, led to the near depopulation of the region.

In 1789, the city of Tarapoto, was founded, following the same pattern as Lamas. A central city inhabited by Spaniards and Criollos was surrounded by suburbs of tributary indigenous communities; in this case Suchichis, Coscoasas and Amasifuenes. The Indians of Lamas and Tarapoto enjoyed a greater degree of autonomy in the late colonial period. At the turn of the 19th century, they began to form colonies in the vicinity of their hunting grounds, usually one or two days travel from Lamas or Tarapoto. These new settlers, once established, were usually then joined by Criollos, who would form nuclear villages near the indigenous colonies, and enter into a similar pattern of exploitation as found in Lamas and Tarapoto.

Although the indigenous peoples of the Lamas region were, by the late colonial period more unified in terms of language, material culture, observance of religious festival and social position, their original tribal designations remained important. Hostility between the various groups, often with roots prior to the conquest, came to the fore in ritualised violence on saints' days and other religious festivals. This typically occurred in front of the church at Lamas and involved the use of lances and stones, creating such disorder that the local Criollos would barricade themselves inside their houses.

=== Post-independence: 1826-1975 ===
By the period of Peruvian independence, the Lamistas formed a group with a single language, which outsiders identified as a single ethnicity rather than the "six nations" of the colonial period. However, although the Lamistas had lost their original tribal languages, there were still taboos about intermarrying between different suburbs of Lamas, originating in the fact each suburb had initially housed a separate tribe. These taboos did not fully disappear until the mid 20th century.

The 19th century saw the continued geographical expansion of the Lamista population in Peruvian Amazonia. This took the form both of the founding of new communities and of migration to communities in which they were an ethnic minority. In the 1830s, neighbourhoods of Lamistas could be found in Chasuta (50 km from Lamas) and Tocache (150 km from Lamas), with Lamistas sometimes holding political office in the former. Lamistas also engaged in commerce during this period, travelling to more distant locations, such as Iquitos on the Amazon and Huánuco in the Andes. They supplied items such as cotton, tools and particularly curare, a poison which was used in hunting, which they continued to produce commercially into the 1980s.

Despite this economic role, many Lamistas remained obliged to undertake unpaid work for their patrones, due to the prevalence of debt peonage in the region. This often took the form of acting as bearers, carrying goods, or even people, on their backs. Weiss reported that Lamista porters were able to carry loads of 60 kilos for 20 to 30 kilometres a day, and that they would often take loads of up to 80 kilos for shorter distances.

The 19th century saw increasing demands for labour and taxation placed on the indigenous people of the region by local and national authorities, as well as intensification of the use of debt to extract labour from them by whites and mestizos. This break with the colonial system of obligations, developed under the mission system, led to rebellions in San Jose de Sisa in 1887 and in the village of Chazuta in 1893. These changes were accompanied by mass male migration, often forced, to the eastern regions of Peru where there was a massive demand for labour due to the rubber boom. The conditions in which these migrants were forced to work were frequently appalling. This again led to a period of depopulation in the region of Lamas.

==== The llakta cycle ====
The depopulation of the forest areas around Lamas in the 19th century led to the expansion of the Kichwa-speaking Lamistas into new territories, and the founding of new communities which were no longer dependent on contact with Lamas. These settlements then attracted Criollo and Mestizo migration, leading to the creation of new urban nuclei close by, replicating the relationship of the Kichwa suburbs of Lamas with the white-dominated central districts of the town. Lamistas would then emigrate from the town to found a new settlement, and the process would begin again. This method of colonisation is known in Spanish as El ciclo llakta (Spanish: el ciclo "the cycle", Quechua: llakta "village").

The llakta cycle may stop for various reasons at any of its three phases, but during the 19th and 20th centuries, it was a considerable force for the expansion of Lamista culture. From the nucleus of Lamas and its dependent settlements, Lamistas migrated to the region around San José de Sisa, where the cycle took place from 1850 to 1920. At the same time, a separate wave of expansion occurred towards Chazuta. In Juanjuí, the cycle occurred slightly later, from 1870 to 1920, and was in part motivated by the desire to cultivate tobacco. Finally, the territory around Pongo, downstream from Chazuta on the Huallaga river, was colonised between 1950 and 1970.

The new secondary zones of settlement developed their own cultural identities, and themselves became the launch pad for waves of lamista colonisation:

- The area around Campanilla was colonised between 1920 and 1970 from the nucleus of Sisa.
- The Biabo River district was colonised between 1950 and 1970 from the nucleus of Juanjuí.
- The Ponaza River area was colonised from both Lamas and the Biabo, post-1970.
- Pampa Hermosa was colonised from Lamas and Pongo, post-1970.

The expansion of Kichwa residents of Lamas into new areas was usually conducted by groups from the same suburb and lineage (see below) moving into a specific territory, rather than a mixture of families of different origins. This may reflect the partial continuation of pre-conquest identities in Lamas, where the Spanish settled each of the "six-nations" in their own suburbs.

The reasons for these migrations were manifold. Avoiding forced labour imposed by regional governors was a strong motivating factor, alongside the need to escape from feuds between kinship groups. Others migrated for religious reasons, evangelical Protestants often wished to avoid the responsibilities associated with participation in the fraternities that celebrate local Catholic festivals. Other reasons are valid today; the desire to find new and plentiful hunting grounds, the need for new agricultural land and the lack of inheritance for younger sons are all still motivating factors for migration.

=== Modern Peru: after 1975 ===
The region of San Martin went through a boom in the production of rice and maize in the seventies and eighties, leading to high levels of deforestation. This reduced the populations of game species and led to the displacement of indigenous populations to more marginal agricultural land, which negatively affected the quality of diet and made indigenous lifestyles more difficult to sustain. This boom, however, was dependent on subsidies for agricultural production, which were withdrawn in the mid-1980s, leaving the region open to a massive expansion in the illicit production of coca.

The presence of coca-cultivation increased internal migration to the area, and attracted rebel groups, especially the TARM. This further restricted the traditional hunting lifestyle of the Lamistas, due both to the presence of rebels and narcos, and the danger of being attacked by the Peruvian military. The Wayna Purina, an area of mythological and practical importance for the Lamistas, was used by the Peruvian Army as a dumping ground for the bodies of their victims.

In the post conflict period, the Peruvian government has undertaken a series of measures aimed at reducing deforestation which have negatively affected the Lamistas. In 2005, the Cordillera Escalera regional conservation area was created, which, without any prior public consultation process, criminalised hunting and agriculture within its bounds. This area has long been utilised for hunting and small-scale cultivation by the Lamistas, and contains sites of ritual and mythological significance. Despite this, Kichwa families from several locations have been prosecuted for maintaining their traditional agricultural activities in the protected area.

The official recognition of Lamista communities by the government has been slow. Although the Peruvian government created the legal category of Native Community in the 1974 Ley de Comunidades Nativas, the first 14 Lamista settlements to gain this status did not obtain it until 1997. According to anthropologist Anahí Chaparro, there has been reluctance to designate Lamista groups as Native Communities, in part because to do so may lead to them claiming rights to territory within regional conservation areas. Between 2001 and 2016, no Lamista communities were granted the status of Native Community, and its associated rights. However the subsequent years have seen an increasing push for recognition by Lamistas, with communities resorting to both protest and legal action in their attempts to gain this status.

== Culture ==
The Kichwa-Lamista have a culture which integrates elements of Amazonian, Andean and European origin. Their agricultural practices are typically Amazonian, except in their preference for maize over manioc, but their traditional crafts show Andean influence, and they were historically divided into moieties similar to those found in the Andes. Their religious beliefs are ostensibly Catholic, but strong Quechua and Amazonian elements are also present.

=== Residence patterns, subsistence activities and diet ===
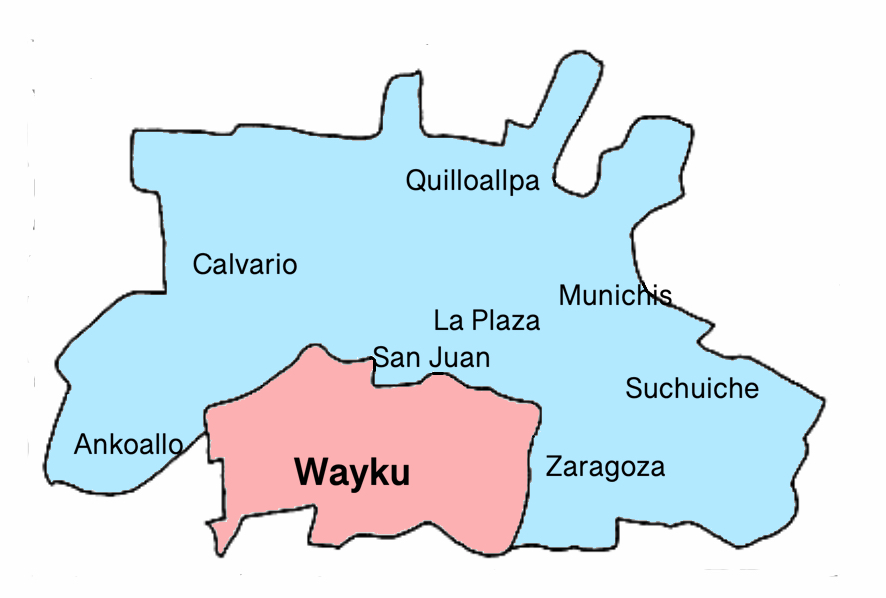
The Lamista suburb of Wayku in the town of Lamas. The suburb was the starting point of Lamista expansion, and many Lamista families had a "weekend house" there.

The Lamistas first emerged in the neighbourhood of Wayku in the city of Lamas, and they still maintain a strong presence in the city. Lamistas practice multilocal residence, generally spending the week either hunting or in their chacras (Quechua and Amazonic Spanish, a cultivated area, usually distant from the main residence), but returning to an urban residence for weekends and religious festivals. In Lamas, this house will usually be in Wayku, and the chacras are located at a day or two's travel from the city, in other more rural settlements the Chacras may be only a few hours from the principal dwelling place.

The Kichwa live in the highland forest of San Martin, on the border of the Amazonian and Andean zones of Peru. The region is hilly, with altitudes ranging from 400m to 2500m, and traversed by many rivers of differing sizes. As such, it provides a variety of microclimates, each allowing for the cultivation of a different set of crops. Many Lamista families take advantage of this by acquiring, borrowing or renting land in diverse microclimates in order to cultivate a wider range of produce. The Lamistas practice slash and burn agriculture, and intercropping, where several different species are cultivated in the same field. The crops they cultivate for subsistence use include: maize, banana, common beans, squash, manioc, Sacha inchik, peanuts, rice, pigeon pea, Talinum paniculatum, Colocasia sp and cotton. Cash crops include coffee and pineapple. They also raised chickens and pigs for domestic and commercial use. The daily staple foods of the community are chicha (a beer made of maize) boiled bananas and boiled beans.

The Lamistas also undertake hunting trips to the forest in order to procure bushmeat. Their preferred hunting seasons are around Carnival in February, and around the period of the festival of Santa Rosa in August, when the animals are well-fed due to the abundance of wild fruit. Their preferred game is white-lipped peccary, deer and turtles, although other species are taken and any kind of bird may be caught to supplement diet in times when agricultural production is low. Since the 1970s, wild game has started to form less of their diet, as deforestation and over-hunting has reduced animal numbers.

The Lamistas also consumed salted fish, particularly bocachico and arapaima, which were caught in seasonal hunting expeditions. However, the daily protein of Lamistas was typically obtained from areas of secondary forest, where snails, small fish, lizards and some insects were hunted. Palm nuts were also gathered, and formed an important part of the traditional diet.

It is typical for Lamistas to drink coffee, herbal infusions, masato (when it is available) and chicha. Masato is a manioc beer, prepared by Lamista women, who chew the manioc then spit it into a large pot for fermentation.

=== Lineages ===
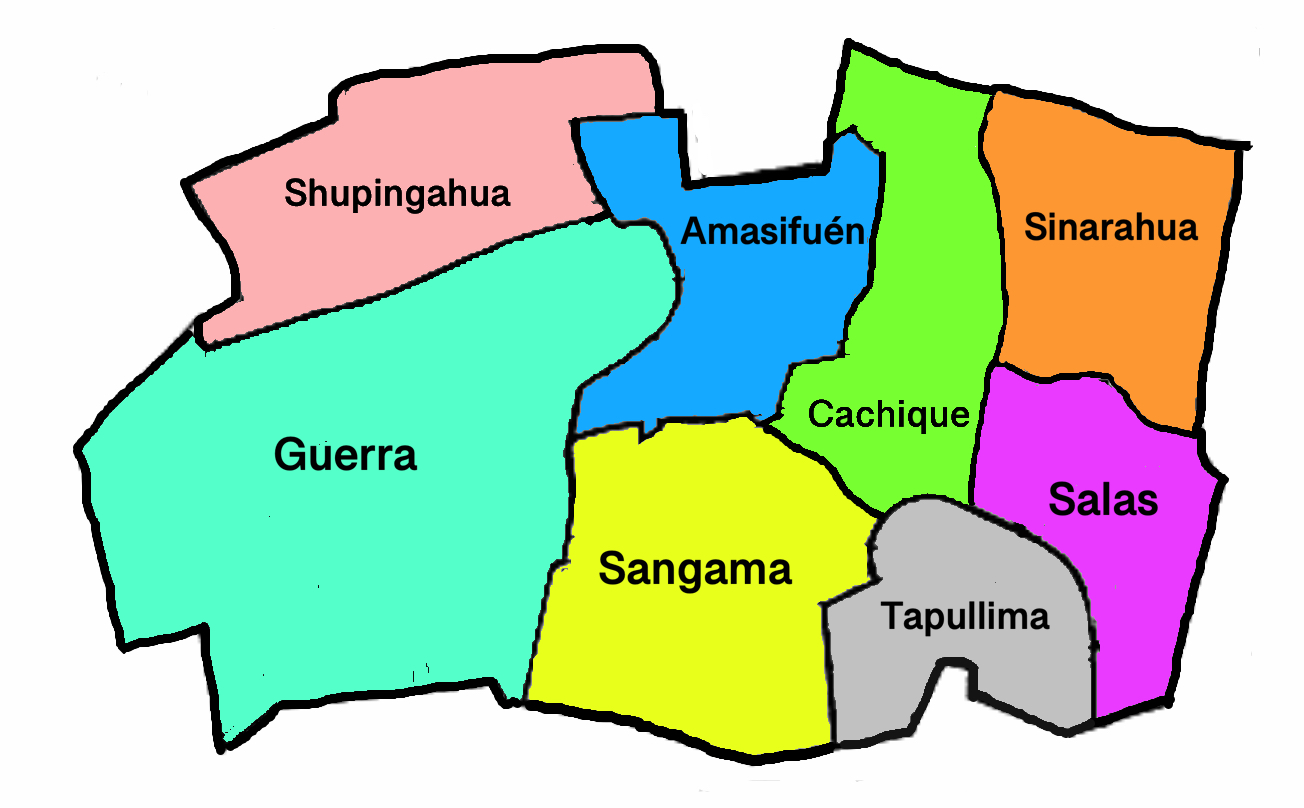
The locations of the sectors of Wayku suburb, Lamas, corresponding to the 8 Kichwa-Lamista lineages resident in the city.

The Lamistas are divided into family groupings which Schjellerup refers to as lineages. Each lineage lives in a corresponding sector of the Lamas suburb of Wayku. Weiss stated that the lineages had formerly been endogamous, but that cross-lineage marriages were already occurring by the 1940s. This social division may have its origin in the colonial period, when there were eight ethnic groups present in the reduction of Lamas, who were each allocated a specific area of residence. Scazzocchio states that during the colonial period, the pre-conquest system of tribal alliances and enmities remained in effect, with the primary antagonism existing between the Salas lineage, descendants of the Tabalosos, and the Amasifuenes and their Sangama allies. This led to armed conflicts between the lineages/ethnic groups during religious festivals, particularly at Corpus Christi. Scazzocchio considered the taboo on intermarriage, and the traces of hostility which persisted into the 1970s, to be a continuation of this intra-ethnic animosity.

Modern Lamista lineages and ethnic groups present in the colonial reduction of Lamas
Modern Lamista lineages.	Lineages present in Lamas in 1959.	Ethnic groups present in Lamas in 1656
Amasifuén	Amasifuén	Amasifuynes
Cachique	Guerras	Cascabosoas
Guerra	Ishuizas	Juamuncos
Salas (formerly Tabalosos)	Pashanaces	Lamas
Sangama	Salas	Muniches
Shupingahua	Sangamas	Payananzos
Sinarahua	Shupinahuas	Suchichis
Tapullima	Sinarahuas	Tabalosos
Huaman (in Pamashto)	Tapullimas	
Ischiza (no longer resident in Wayku)	Tuamanas	
Pashanasi (in Pachilla and Urco Pata)		

The expansion of the Lamistas from the city of Lamas into new territories, from the late 18th century until the 1970s, was carried out along lines of lineage. Settlers from a particular sector of Wayku, and therefore the same lineage, would colonise a specific area as a group. According to Scazzochio, the initial expansions of the Lamistas reflected the areas of origin of the ethnic groups from which they were descended; the Salas, Ischiza, Satalaya and Saboya towards the Sisa River, the Amasifuenes on the western bank of the mid-Huallaga and the Sangama north towards Chasuta. Schjellerup notes that the Ischiza are no longer found in Lamas, and that these migration patterns were no longer valid at the turn of the 21st century.

=== Religion and ritual ===
The Lamistas are predominantly Roman Catholic, although there are evangelical Protestants in some communities. In addition to this, Lamistas engage in shamanistic practices and hold non-Christian beliefs relating to supernatural entities.

Barbira Freedman writes that Lamistas used to practice headhunting as a coming of age ritual for young men. However, this has been replaced by killing a jaguar or completing military service in the Peruvian army.

==== Shamanistic practices ====
Lamistas are specialists in a type of shamanism known as tree-bark medicine ("the path of the paleros"). This involves the creation of tonics, medicines and elixirs using the bark of trees, which are categorised according to their stature and properties of their roots, sap, bark and seeds. In common with other Amazonian peoples, the Lamistas attribute the origins of their shamanic powers to the Rainbow Anaconda.

Lamista shamans use both tobacco and ayahuasca for ritual purposes, and must engage in strict regimes of fasting or abstention before producing certain preparations. Shamans were also responsible for the production of curare, a dangerous process requiring expert knowledge.

Both men and women can become shamans, although Barbira-Freeman estimates that less than 1% of women are shamans, and the ratio of male shamans to female is 15-to-1. Female shamans have a limited range of powers; they are unable to send pathogenic magical darts to harm their enemies and they do not take ayahuasca.

Women are considered to be more vulnerable to attack from supernatural entities, especially water spirits, particularly when lactating or menstruating. Women are also prohibited from handling the "master plants", like ayahuasca and tobacco, and from engaging in any shamanic activity, during menstruation. This is due to the Lamista view that permeability of the body is the source of physical and spiritual illness, and menstruation and lactation are viewed as moments of especial permeability.

Lamista shaman engaged in trade and exchange of magical items with shamans of other groups, such as the Cholones and Jivaroans. These visits sometimes involved periods of learning new forms of medicine from a Shaman of another group, in a relationship of master and pupil. This occasionally resulted in a marriage to one of the shaman's daughters, one of the few situations in which Lamistas practice exogamy. Lamistas still seek out lowland shamans in order to acquire knowledge of the medicine of water plants, to exchange for their own bark medicine.

==== Catholic festivals ====
Participation in Catholic religious festivals constitutes the most public enactment of Kichwa ethnic identity. The most important festival is the annual celebration of the feast of Santa Rosa Raymi in Lamas, which lasts for 10 days in late August and attracts participants and spectators from all over San Martin and beyond. The festival involves feasts, live music and dancing and culminates with an event called pato tipina (Sp. "pato" = duck, Quechua "tipina" = destruction). This event, based on European traditions like the Spanish corrida de gallos, involves young men attempting to rip the head off a duck tied to the top of two long poles. The typical music of the festival is a type of fife and drum music, and the dancing is typically a local variant of Peru's national dance, the marinera. The festival is hosted and organised by one of the eight lamista lineages on a basis of annual rotation, with four prominent members of that year's hosting lineage selected as patrons. The festival can take four years to prepare and is extremely costly, with patrons using networks of patronage, favours and family obligations, as well as considerable economic resources, to obtain the resources and labour necessary.

Lamista communities also typically celebrate carnival in February or early March, Saint John's day in June, and the day of the Patron saint of their local community. In some Lamista communities the Day of the Dead is also celebrated, featuring participants disguised to represent souls returned from the dead.

== See also ==
Quechua people

Lamas, Peru
