= Otavalo Canton =

- Canton
- Location of Imbabura Province in Ecuador.

- Cantons of Imbabura Province
- Coordinates: 0°14′N 78°16′W
- Country: Ecuador
- Province: Imbabura Province
- Capital: Otavalo

Area
  - Total: 530.5 km^{2} (204.8 sq mi)
- Elevation: 2,530 m (8,300 ft)

Population (2022 census)
  - Total: 114,303
  - Density: 215.5/km^{2} (558.0/sq mi)
- Time zone: UTC−5 (ECT)

Otavalo Canton is a canton of Ecuador, located in Imbabura Province. Its capital is the city of Otavalo. The Canton's population in the 2010 census was 104,874 compared to 90,188 in the 2001 census. Its area is 530.5 square kilometres (204.8 sq mi). Indigenous people, especially the Otavalo people, make up 57 percent of the total population.

== Demographics ==
Ethnic groups as of the Ecuadorian census of 2010:

- Indigenous 57.2%
- Mestizo 40.3%
- White 1.1%
- Afro-Ecuadorian 1.0%
- Montubio 0.2%
- Other 0.1%
