= QVS =

QVS may refer to:

- Queen Victoria School (Fiji)
- Queen Victoria School, Dunblane, Scotland
- Lamas Quechua, a language of Peru (ISO code: qvs)
