= Blanca Chancoso =

Ecuadorian indigenous leader (born 1955)

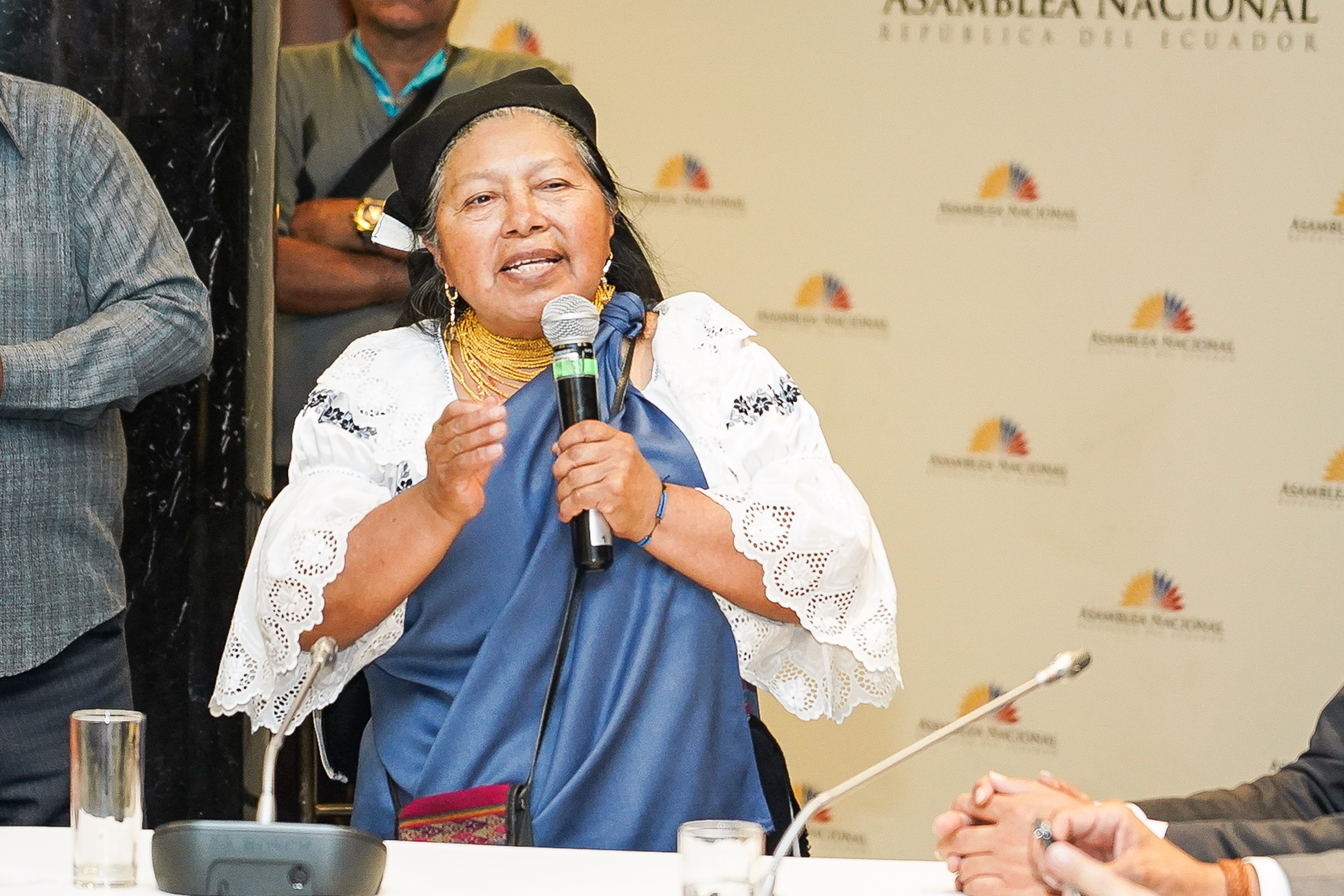
Chancoso in 2019

María Blanca Chancoso Sánchez (born 1955) is an Ecuadorian educator and indigenous leader of the Otavalo people.

Chancoso was born in Cotacachi, Imbabura Province, Ecuador in 1955, in an indigenous family which had moved from the countryside into the town. She studied in a rural college and has a bachelor's degree in educational sciences. She was unusual in being a teacher who spoke both Spanish and Kichwa language, and began to organise the local communities. She established the Federación de Indígenas y Campesinos de Imbabura in 1974, and in 1980 was at the forefront of campaigns for bilingual education and the recognition of multinationality in Ecuador. She is one of the founders of ECUARUNARI (Ecuador Runakunapak Rikcharimuy or Confederation of Peoples of Kichwa Nationality) and of Confederation of Indigenous Nationalities of Ecuador (CONAIE).

Chancoso has written on the theme of Sumak kawsay, which can be translated as "the plentiful life". In 2014 she was a judge at the 2nd International Rights of Nature Tribunal held in Lima.

== Selected publications ==
- Chancoso, Blanca (2014). "El Sumak Kawsay desde la visión de mujer". Sumak Kawsay Yuyay : antología del pensamiento indigenista ecuatoriano sobre Sumak Kawsay (1ª ed.). [Huelva]: Centro de Investigación en Migraciones, Universidad de Huelva. pp. 221–228. ISBN 978-84-616-8167-9. Originally published in 2010 in América Latina en Movimiento. Alternativas Civilizatorias: los viejos nuevos sentidos de humanidad, 453: 6-9
