= Lowland Peruvian Quechua =

Quechuan languages of northern Peru

- Chachapoyas–Lamas Quechua
- Native to: Peru
- Native speakers: (22,000 cited 2000–2003)
- Language family: Quechuan: Quechua II; Northern; Lowland Peruvian Quechua

Language codes
- ISO 639-3: Variously: qvs – Lamas (San Martín) quk – Chachapoyas qup – Southern Pastaza Quechua
- Glottolog: sanm1289 Lamas chac1250 Chachapoyas sout2990 Southern Pastaza Quechua
- ELP: Chachapoyas Quechua; San Martín Quechua

Lowland Peruvian Quechua, or Chachapoyas–Lamas Quechua, are Quechuan languages spoken in the lowlands of northern Peru. The two principal varieties are:

- Lamas Quechua, or San Martín Quechua (Lamista, Llakwash Runashimi), spoken in Lamas Province of San Martín Region, as well as in some villages on the Huallaga River in the Ucayali Region by some 15,000 people
- Chachapoyas Quechua or Amazonas Quechua, spoken in Chachapoyas Province and Luya Province in the Amazonas Region by some 7000 people

Few children are learning Chachapoyas Quechua. Conila is said to be the last village where children are able to speak it.

Lowland Peruvian Quechua is similar in pronunciation to some of the Ecuadorian Kichwa language varieties. It is much more conservative, however, in its morphology. For example, it has retained the inclusive/exclusive distinction for "we", which has been lost in all of the Ecuadorian Quechuan languages.

== Bibliography ==
- Gerald Taylor, 2006. Diccionario Quechua Chachapoyas-Lamas (– Castellano)
- Marinerell Park, Nancy Weber, Víctor Cenepo S. 1975. Diccionario Quechua de San Martín – Castellano y vice versa. Ministerio de educación del Perú
