= San Martín District =

Coordinates: 6.5141°S 76.7413°W

San Martín
- District
- Interactive map of San Martín
- Country: Peru
- Region: San Martín
- Province: El Dorado
- Founded: April 6, 1962
- Capital: San Martín

Government
  - Mayor: Wilmer Sanchez Muñoz

Area
  - Total: 562.57 km^{2} (217.21 sq mi)
- Elevation: 420 m (1,380 ft)

Population (2017)
  - Total: 10,447
  - Density: 18.570/km^{2} (48.096/sq mi)
- Time zone: UTC-5 (PET)
- UBIGEO: 220303

San Martín District is one of five districts of the province El Dorado in Peru.

== Climate ==
Climate data for Alao, San Martín, elevation 420 m (1,380 ft), (1991–2020)
Month	Jan	Feb	Mar	Apr	May	Jun	Jul	Aug	Sep	Oct	Nov	Dec	Year
Mean daily maximum °C (°F)	32.9 (91.2)	32.3 (90.1)	31.7 (89.1)	31.4 (88.5)	31.3 (88.3)	31.0 (87.8)	31.0 (87.8)	32.2 (90.0)	32.5 (90.5)	32.6 (90.7)	32.7 (90.9)	32.6 (90.7)	32.0 (89.6)
Mean daily minimum °C (°F)	21.4 (70.5)	21.5 (70.7)	21.4 (70.5)	21.2 (70.2)	21.1 (70.0)	20.2 (68.4)	19.6 (67.3)	19.5 (67.1)	20.0 (68.0)	21.1 (70.0)	21.5 (70.7)	21.5 (70.7)	20.8 (69.5)
Average precipitation mm (inches)	86.1 (3.39)	109.8 (4.32)	178.7 (7.04)	174.7 (6.88)	119.5 (4.70)	82.7 (3.26)	75.2 (2.96)	68.0 (2.68)	118.5 (4.67)	155.8 (6.13)	130.0 (5.12)	116.5 (4.59)	1,415.5 (55.74)
Source: National Meteorology and Hydrology Service of Peru
