= Regional Conservation Area Cordillera Escalera =

Conservation area in San Martín, Peru

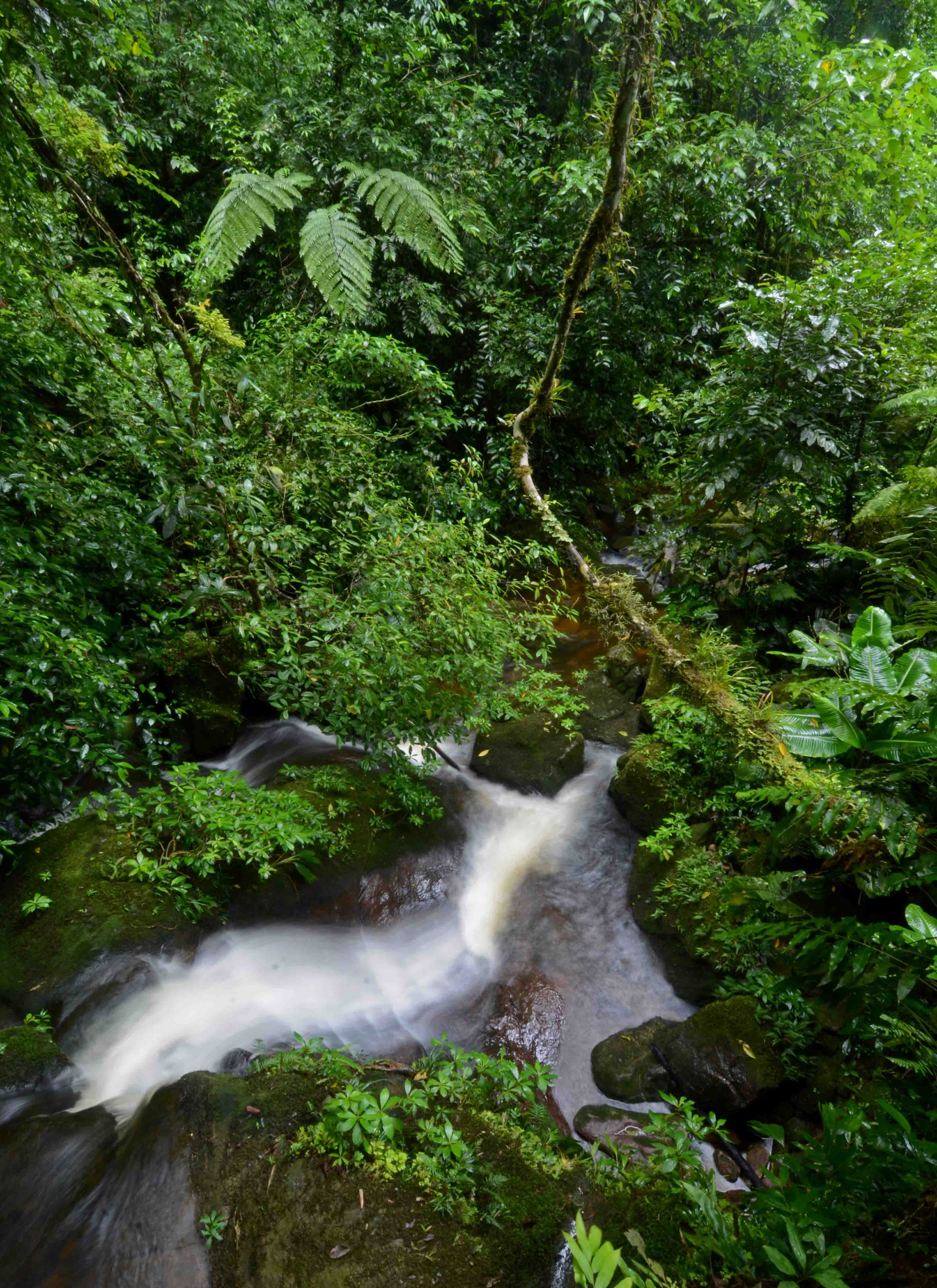
- Interactive map of Regional Conservation Area Cordillera Escalera
- Location: San Martín Region, Peru
- Nearest city: Tarapoto
- Area: 1,498.7 square kilometres (370,300 acres)
- Established: 2005
- Governing body: Regional Government of San Martín

The Regional Conservation Area Cordillera Escalera (Spanish: Área de Conservación Regional Cordillera Escalera, RCA-CE) is a protected area in the San Martín Region of northeastern Peru, situated on the eastern edge of the Andes. Established in 2005, it encompasses 1,498.7 square kilometres (370,300 acres) of mountainous cloud and montane forest at the interface between the Andean highlands and lowland Amazonia.

The conservation area overlaps with the traditional territories of the Kichwa-Lamista people of San Martín, who have been engaged in an ongoing conflict with the regional government over access and governance rights since the area's establishment.

== Geography and ecology ==
The RCA-CE lies within the Montaña region, a transitional zone between the Andean highlands and lowland Amazonia, at approximately 809 metres (2,653 feet) above sea level. This area has historically served as a pathway connecting the two ecosystems.

The region faces ongoing threats from illegal settlers (colonos) who clear land for agriculture, expanding the agricultural frontier at the expense of the forest.

== Indigenous peoples ==
The Montaña region has long been inhabited by Indigenous Amazonian peoples, who have developed deep cultural, spiritual, and economic ties to its forest landscape. The Kichwa-Lamista people of San Martín are among these groups, and have maintained traditions of healing, farming, fishing, and hunting within the forest across generations. Within their worldview, every nonhuman component of the environment has a purpose, and this understanding is expressed through practices that aim to disturb the forest as little as possible.

The Montaña's strategic location between the Andean and Amazonian worlds made its Indigenous inhabitants essential intermediaries in pre-colonial and colonial trade networks. They acted as interpreters, guides, and the primary labour force connecting different ethnic groups. They were also the main producers and traders of goods native to the region that could not be found elsewhere, such as salt, salted fish, and a substance called Ampi. Colonial accounts from the period acknowledge the people of the Montaña as part of a large economic and social network, and recognise their relative autonomy in navigating and living off the forest.

Following the establishment of the first Spanish colonial towns in the region in 1538—placed where the Lamistas live today, in part due to the Montaña's proximity to tributaries of the Amazon River and its fertile soils—Indigenous people's expertise in the forest largely prevented the consolidation of colonial control.

=== Governance conflict ===
Since the RCA-CE's establishment in 2005, the Lamista people of San Martín have been restricted from accessing the forest and the economic and cultural activities associated with it. They have sought to participate in the regional government's decision-making processes regarding the management of the conservation area, but have faced significant obstacles in doing so.

The regional government has not allocated sufficient resources to effectively protect the conservation area from illegal settlement and deforestation. The exclusion of the Lamistas from the area has reduced opportunities to report and challenge the presence of colonos encroaching on the forest. Critics argue that this undermines the very conservation goals the RCA-CE was established to achieve, as the Kichwa's longstanding presence contributed to the forest's preservation prior to the area's formal designation.

== Bibliography ==
- Wakild, Emily. Revolutionary Parks: Conservation, Social Justice, and Mexico's National Parks, 1910–1940. Tucson: University of Arizona Press, 2011.
- Radding, Cynthia. Landscapes of Power and Identity: Comparative Histories in the Sonoran Desert and the Forests of Amazonia from Colony to Republic. Durham, NC: Duke University Press, 2006.
- Leal, Claudia. "Conservation Memories: Vicissitudes of a Biodiversity Conservation Project in the Rainforests of Colombia, 1992–1998." Environmental History 20, no. 3 (2015): 368–395. doi:10.1093/envhis/emv051.
