= San José de Sisa District =

Coordinates: 6.6166°S 76.7086°W

San José de Sisa
- District
- Interactive map of San José de Sisa
- Country: Peru
- Region: San Martín
- Province: El Dorado
- Founded: November 25, 1876
- Capital: San José de Sisa

Government
  - Mayor: Prof. Elmer Gonzalez Coronel

Area
  - Total: 299.9 km^{2} (115.8 sq mi)
- Elevation: 340 m (1,120 ft)

Population (2017)
  - Total: 14,639
  - Density: 48.81/km^{2} (126.4/sq mi)
- Time zone: UTC-5 (PET)
- UBIGEO: 220301

San José de Sisa District is one of five districts of the province of El Dorado in Peru. It is a population centre for the Kichwa-Lamista ethnicity, who migrated to the region from Lamas between 1850 and 1920.
