= Lamas Quechua =

Quechua variety of Peru

- San Martín Quechua
- Native to: Peru
- Region: Lamas province, Department of San Martín
- Ethnicity: Kichwa-Lamista people
- Native speakers: (15,000 cited 2000)
- Language family: Quechua: Quechua II; Northern; Lowland Peruvian; Lamas Quechua

Language codes
- ISO 639-3: qvs
- Glottolog: sanm1289
- ELP: San Martín Quechua
- Linguasphere: 84-FAA-dd

Lamas or San Martín Quechua (Lamista, Llakwash Runashimi) is a variety of Quechua spoken in the provinces of Lamas in the Peruvian region of San Martin and in some villages on the river Huallaga in the region of Ucayali. Its speakers are known as Lamistas or Kichwa-Lamista.

Lamas Quechua, along with and Chachapoyas Quechua, make up the Lowland Peruvian subgroup of the Northern Quechua, or Kichwa ("Quechua II-B") language group.

== Bibliography ==
- Marinerell Park, Nancy Weber, Víctor Cenepo S. (1975): Diccionario Quechua de San Martín – Castellano y vice versa. Ministerio de educación del Perú
- Gerald Taylor (2006): Diccionario Quechua Chachapoyas – Lamas – Castellano
