= El Dorado province =

Coordinates: 6.616590°S 76.692400°W

El Dorado
- Province
- Coat of arms

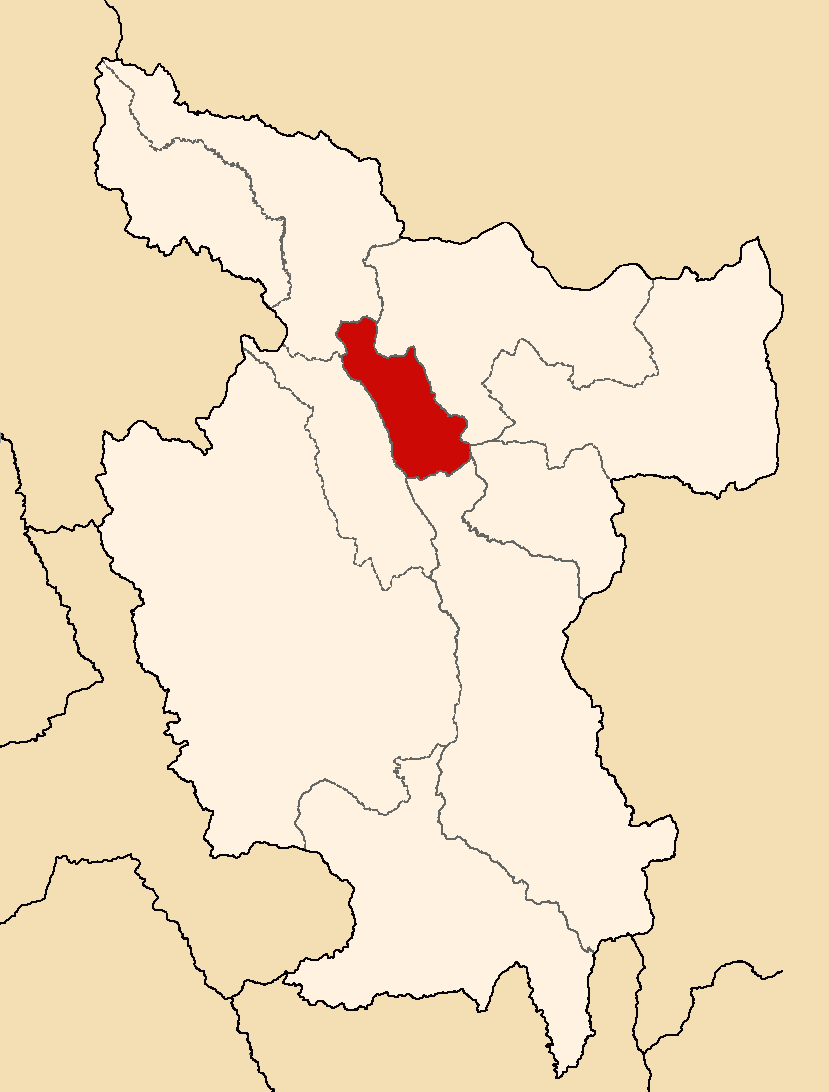
- Location of El Dorado in the San Martín Region
- Country: Peru
- Region: San Martín
- Capital: San José de Sisa

Government
  - Mayor: Francisco Satalaya Castillo

Area
  - Total: 1,298.14 km^{2} (501.21 sq mi)

Population
  - Total: 44,342
  - Density: 34.158/km^{2} (88.469/sq mi)
- UBIGEO: 2203

El Dorado is one of ten provinces of the San Martín Region in northern Peru.

== Political division ==
The province is divided into five districts.

- Agua Blanca (Agua Blanca)
- San José de Sisa (San José de Sisa)
- San Martín (San Martín)
- Santa Rosa (Santa Rosa)
- Shatoja (Shatoja)
