= Agua Blanca District =

Coordinates: 6.7248°S 76.6956°W

Agua Blanca
- District
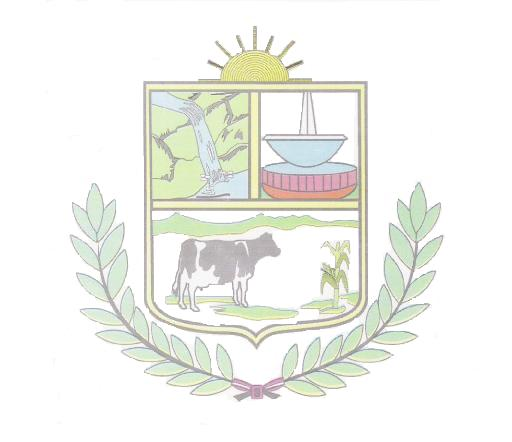
- Coat of arms
- Interactive map of Agua Blanca
- Country: Peru
- Region: San Martín
- Province: El Dorado
- Founded: January 29, 1944
- Capital: Agua Blanca

Government
  - Mayor: Francisco Reategui Hidalgo

Area
  - Total: 168.19 km^{2} (64.94 sq mi)
- Elevation: 300 m (980 ft)

Population (2017)
  - Total: 2,330
  - Density: 13.9/km^{2} (35.9/sq mi)
- Time zone: UTC-5 (PET)
- UBIGEO: 220302

Agua Blanca District is one of five districts of the province El Dorado in Peru.
