= Chimborazo Highland Quichua =

Kichwa variety of Ecuador

- Quichua
- Native to: Ecuador
- Region: Chimborazo Province
- Ethnicity: Kichwa people
- Language family: Quechuan: Quechua II; Northern; Kichwa; Chimborazo Highland Quichua

Language codes
- ISO 639-3: qug
- Glottolog: chim1302
- Linguasphere: 84-FAA-cc

Chimborazo Highland Quechua (Quichua) is a variety of Kichwa spoken in Chimborazo Province of Ecuador.

== Phonology ==
=== Consonants ===
Chimborazo Kichwa consonants
		Bilabial	Dental	Alveolar	Post-alv.	Retroflex	Palatal	Velar	Glottal
Nasal		m		n			ɲ	(ŋ)	
Stop	voiceless	p	t					k	
Stop	aspirated	pʰ	tʰ					kʰ	
Stop	voiced	b	d					ɡ	
Affricate	voiceless				ts		tʃ		
Affricate	aspirated						tʃʰ		
Affricate	voiced						dʒ		
Fricative	voiceless	ɸ		s	ʃ			x	h
Fricative	voiced			z	ʒ	ʐ			
Rhotic				ɾ					
Lateral				l					
Approximant		w					j		

- /n/ is realized as [ŋ] before a velar consonant.
- /k/ is realized as a fricative [x] before a voiceless obstruent, and [ɣ] before a voiced obstruent.

=== Vowels ===
	Front	Central	Back
Close	i iː		u uː
Open	a aː		

- /a, i, u/ can become lax as [ə, ɪ, ʊ] in free variation.
- /a/ is central [ä], and can also be heard as a back [ɑ] in lax form.
