= Shatoja District =

Coordinates: 6.5298°S 76.7198°W

Shatoja
- District
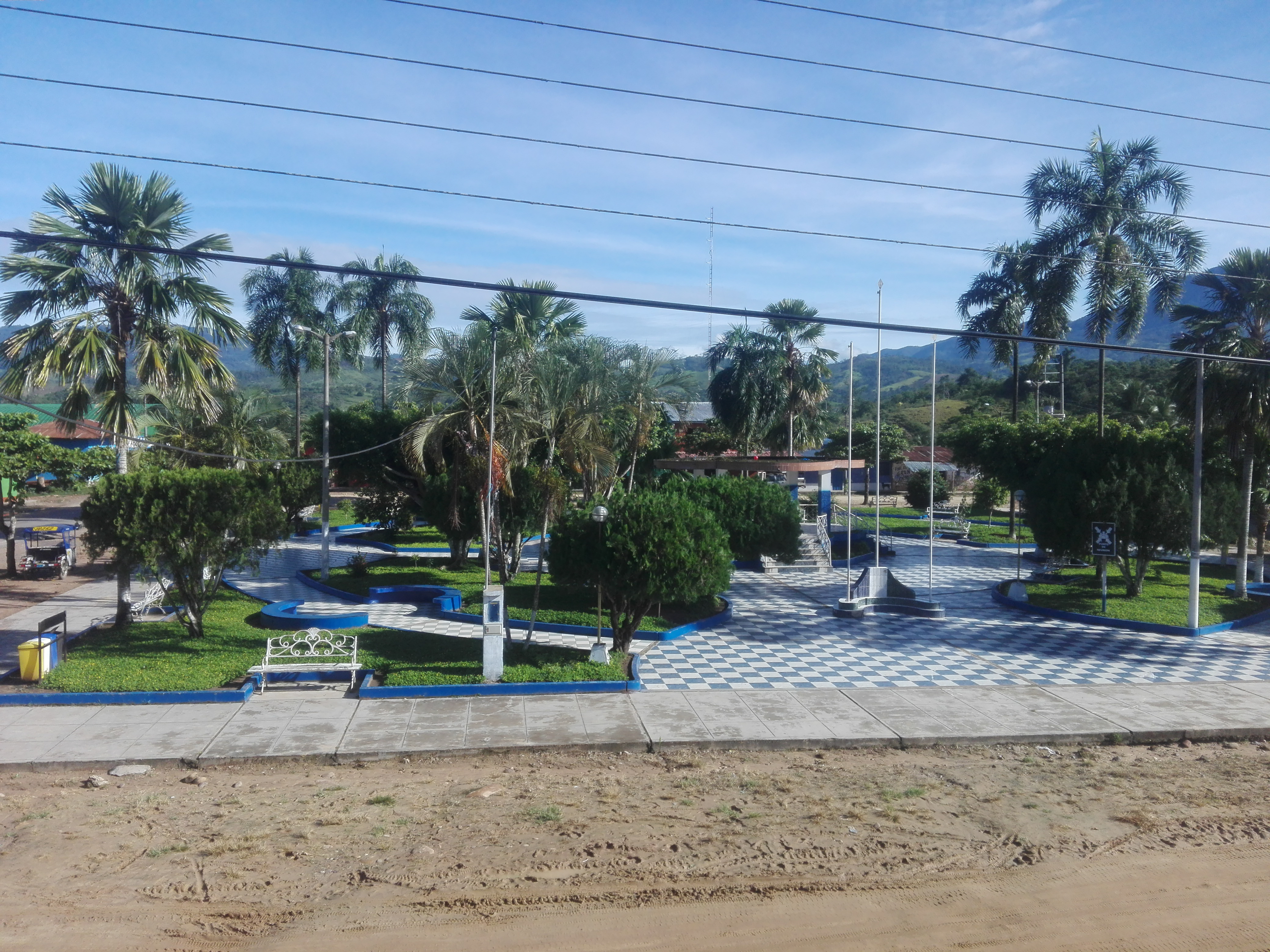
- Shatoja District
- Interactive map of Shatoja
- Country: Peru
- Region: San Martín
- Province: El Dorado
- Founded: April 6, 1962; 64 years ago
- Capital: Shatoja

Government
  - Mayor: Cesar Augusto Coral Ramirez

Area
  - Total: 24.07 km^{2} (9.29 sq mi)
- Elevation: 400 m (1,300 ft)

Population (2005 census)
  - Total: 2,573
  - Density: 106.9/km^{2} (276.9/sq mi)
- Time zone: UTC-5 (PET)
- UBIGEO: 220305

Shatoja District is one of five districts of the province El Dorado in Peru.
