= Tonny Zwollo =

Dutch architect

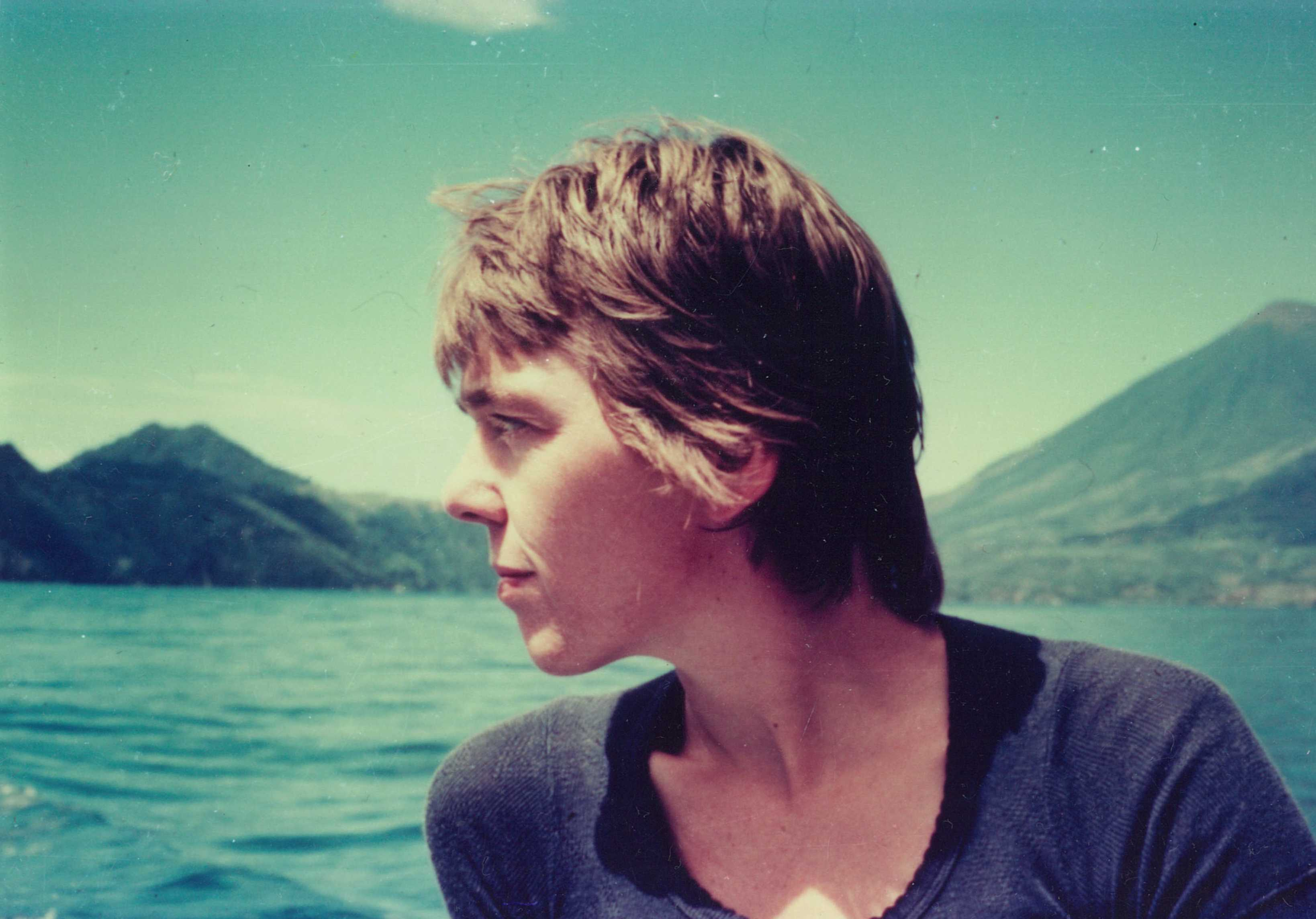
- Architect Tonny Zwollo overlooking the Atitlán Lake (Guatemala) in 1976
- Born: 1 February 1942 (age 84); Amstelveen, the Netherlands
- Died: 15 February 2025 (aged 83); Leiden, the Netherlands
- Occupation: Architect
- Years active: 1964–2025
- Known for: Otavalo Market, Imbabura Province, Ecuador

Tonny Zwollo (born 1942) is a Dutch architect who has worked since 1964 in the Americas. In addition to designing and building over 35 schools in Mexico, she designed the largest indigenous market in South America, in Otavalo, Ecuador. Her approach to architecture is to build what is useful for the local community. Besides schools, she has built a hotel, tourist villages and a swimming pool to boost employment of residents in Oaxaca, Mexico.

== Biography ==
Tonny Zwollo was born on 1 February 1942 in Amstelveen, the Netherlands. She was the daughter of the goldsmith, Marinus Zwollo. She graduated in 1964 with a degree in architecture from the Delft University of Technology, but found it difficult to find work as a female architect in the Netherlands. That same year, Zwollo accepted an offer to work for the Mexican government building schools. Initially employed in Mexico City, she found bias against working with a woman there too and requested that she be transferred to more remote areas. She was sent to Oaxaca, where she had to convince the local villagers to work for her, without pay, to build the schools for their communities. Often, to get supplies to the sites, they had to build airstrips as well. Within two years, she had built nearly 30 airstrips and 35 schools. Her work was featured in Life magazine in 1967. She completed her work with the Mexican government in 1968, graduated in 1970 with a degree in engineering and received the Prix d'Excellence Award for her work.

As her final student project in 1970, Zwollo went to Ecuador to design the Otavalo Market. The market is the largest outdoor market in South America and was not completed until 1973. She built 90 concrete market stalls to create the Plaza de los Ponchos and house the handicrafts of indigenous merchants. She completed her dissertation entitled, Fantasy and architecture, and it was published in English, Spanish and Dutch in 1975. In 1976, Zwollo returned to Oaxaca and worked on a collaborative project to restore the Santa Catalina Convent with architect Martín Ruíz Camino. The conserved sixteenth-century, ex-convent was converted into a five-star hotel called El Presidente, winning Zwollo an additional Prix d'Excellence Award, from France.

In 1990, Zwollo designed another open air market. This one was located in Tlacolula de Matamoros and featured a two-story design with a food court on the second floor and shops on the ground floor. In 1992, she approached Martín Ruíz Camino, with whom she had worked on the convent and proposed a design to boost tourism in Tlacolula. Her idea was to create small tourist houses, similar to the indigenous dwellings dotting the stretch of the Pan-American highway. The houses would allow tourists to live in an authentic dwelling and provide jobs for the indigenous population. Ruíz, who at the time was Secretary for Tourist Development, implemented the idea and Tourist Yú'ù Program was launched in nine villages in the Oaxaca's Central Valley. In 1993, Zwollo and Ruíz published a book about their projects first in Spanish and then under the English title, The Lost Paradise: Architecture and Ecology in the Oaxaca Valley (ISBN 978-9-080-14891-8).

Zwollo was appointed as a consultant in 1996 by Diódoro Carrasco Altamirano, Governor of Oaxaca, for special projects. One of those projects, at Hierve el Agua, created the pools at the ancient canals. Previously, swimming had been forbidden to protect the archaeological heritage of the site, but with the building of the pools, the local community was able to improve employment of local inhabitants through the funds earned by tourism. She created a documentary film, Blue is my colour: designing as an answer to nature about the project.

== Published works ==
- Zwollo, Tonny; Ruiz Zwollo, Paula (1975). Fantasy and architecture. Mexico: s.n. OCLC 841422658.
- Zwollo, Tonny; Ruíz Camino, Martín (1993). Una vez un paraiso: arquitectura y ecología en el valle de Oaxaca. Entre Monte Albán y Mitla. ISBN 978-90-801489-2-5.
- Zwollo, Tonny; Blake, Richard (2005). Blue is my colour: designing as an answer to nature (documentary film). Entre Monte Albán y Mitla. OCLC 175223646.

== Sources ==
- Hunt, George P., ed. (13 October 1967). "The 'Sun Maiden' Architect". LIFE. Vol. 63, no. 15. Time Inc. ISSN 0024-3019.
- Mallarach, Josep-Maria, ed. (2008). Protected Landscapes and Cultural and Spiritual Values. Heidelberg, Germany: Kasparek Verlag. ISBN 978-3-925064-60-9.
