= Santa Rosa District, El Dorado =

Coordinates: 6.7463°S 76.6246°W

Santa Rosa District
- District
- Interactive map of Santa Rosa District
- Country: Peru
- Region: San Martín
- Province: El Dorado
- Founded: April 6, 1962
- Capital: Santa Rosa

Government
  - Mayor: Walter Becerra Vasquez

Area
  - Total: 243.41 km^{2} (93.98 sq mi)
- Elevation: 280 m (920 ft)

Population (2005 census)
  - Total: 5,606
  - Density: 23.03/km^{2} (59.65/sq mi)
- Time zone: UTC-5 (PET)
- UBIGEO: 220304

Santa Rosa District is one of five districts of the province El Dorado in Peru.
