= Otavalo people =

Indigenous people of northern Ecuador

Otavalo
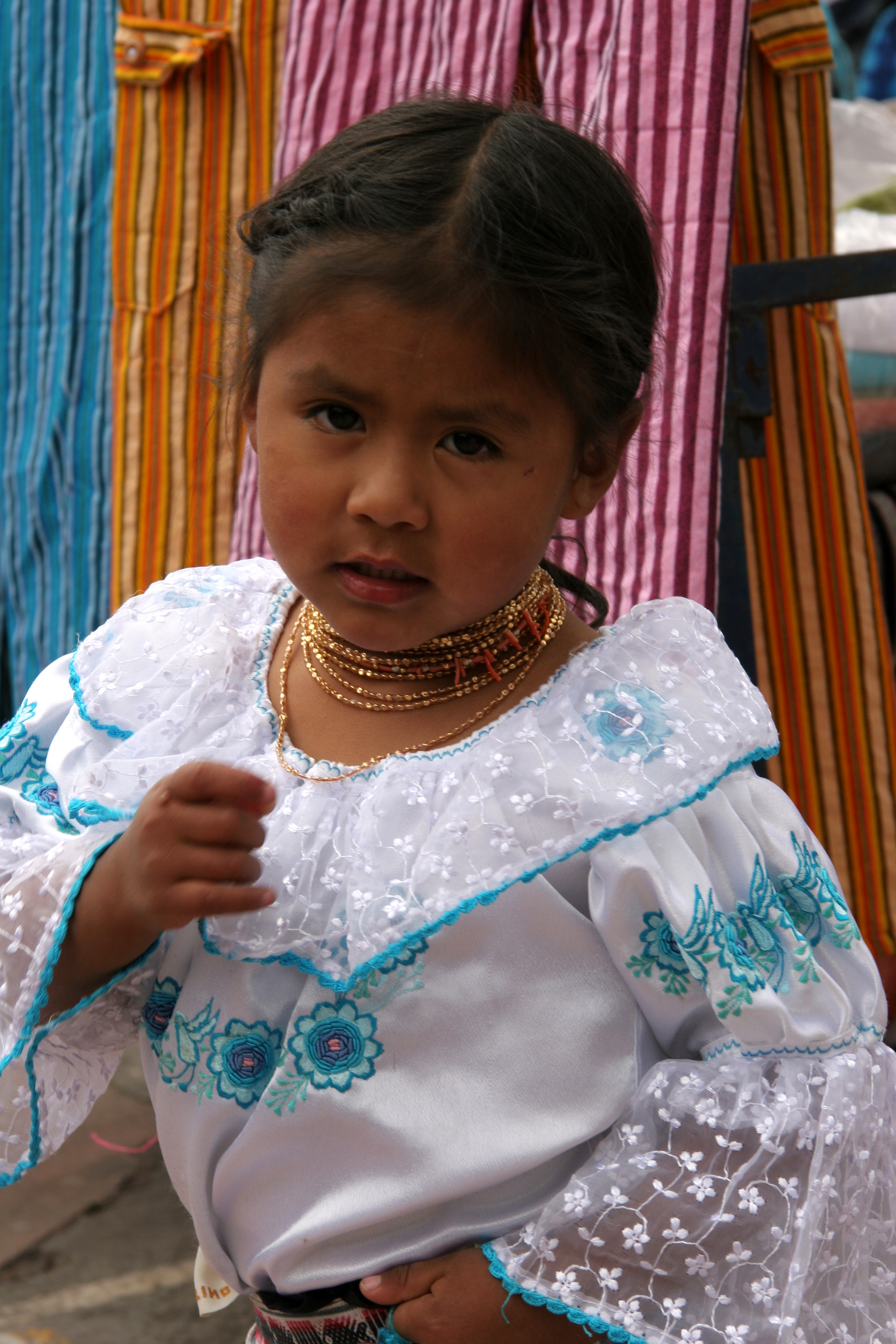
- Otavalo girl in traditional clothing

Regions with significant populations
- Ecuador

Languages
- Kichwa, Spanish, formerly Cara

Religion
- Catholicism Andean Cosmovision

Related ethnic groups
- Other Andean peoples of Ecuador

The Otavalos are an indigenous people native to the Andean mountains of Imbabura Province in northern Ecuador. The Otavalos also inhabit the city of Otavalo in that province. Commerce and handcrafts are among the principal economic activities of the Otavalos, who enjoy a higher standard of living than most indigenous groups in Ecuador and many mestizos of their area.

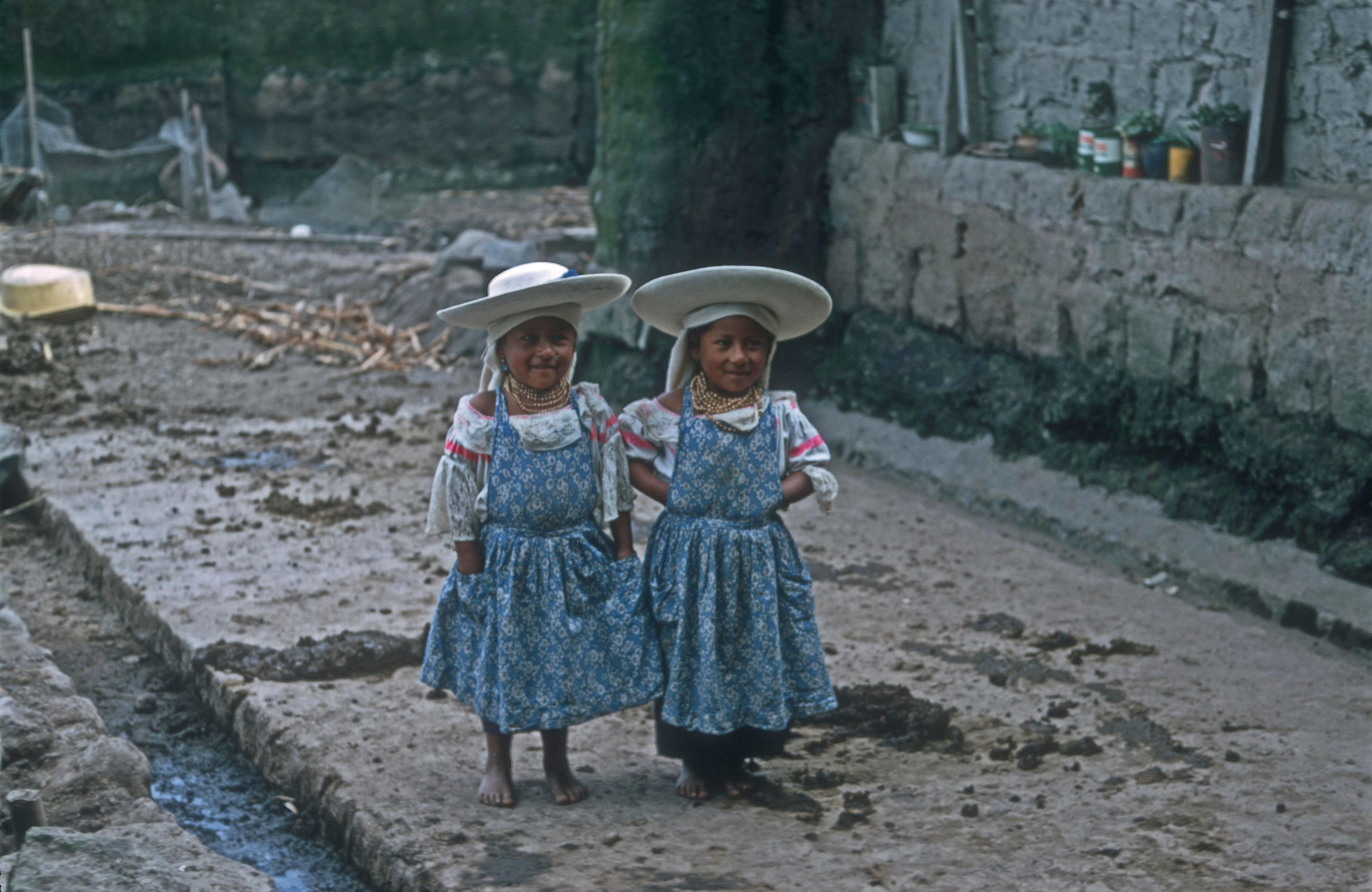
Two Otavalo girls in Cayambe, Ecuador

The Otavalo live in the high, cool altitudes of the Andes. The city of Otavalo is located at an elevation of 2,532 metres (8,307 ft).

== History ==
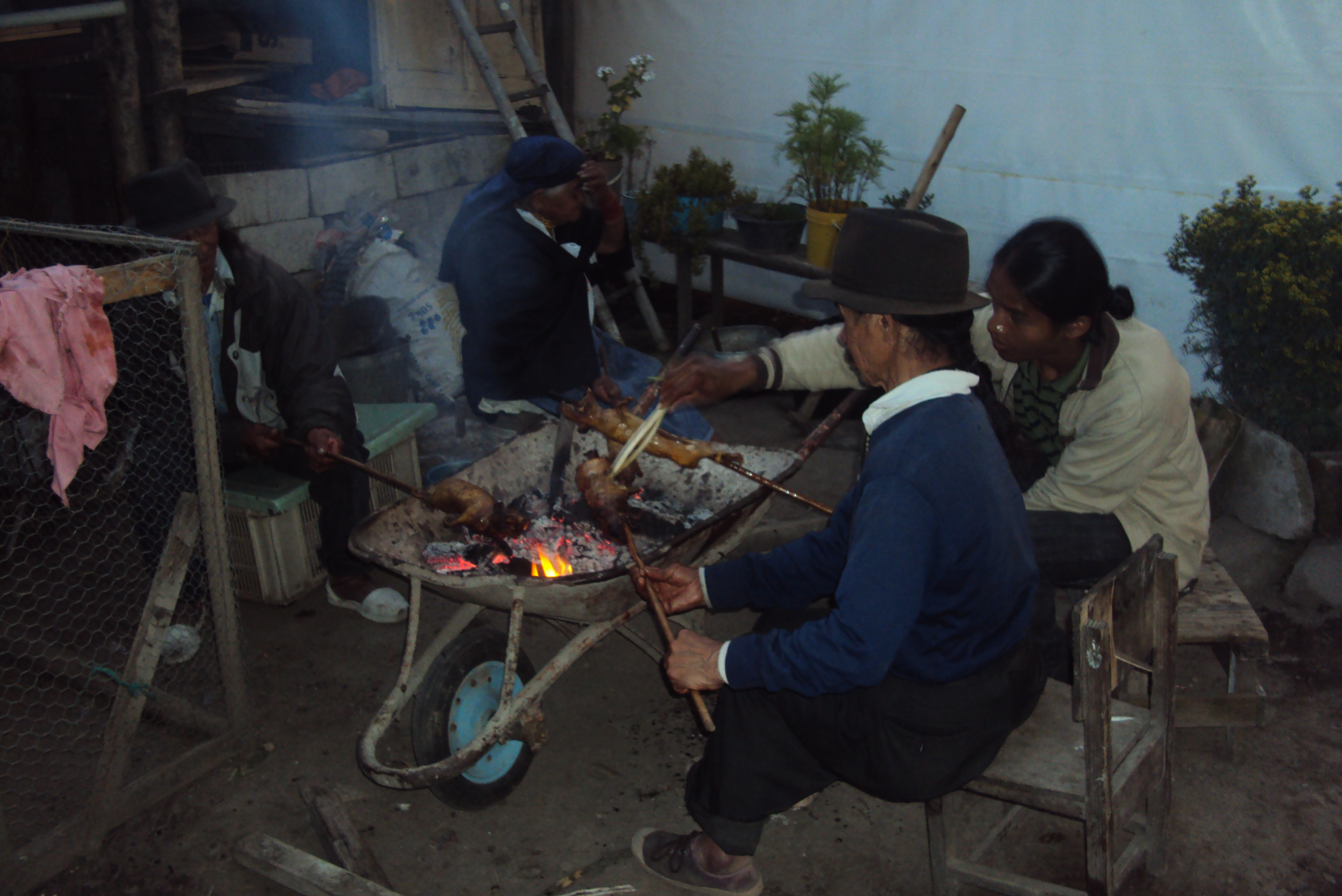
Indigenous people of the Otavalo people, roasting guinea pigs on charcoal.

Prior to the incorporation of the Otavalo people into the Inca Empire in the late 15th or early 16th century, the region north of Quito near the border of present-day Colombia, an area 150 kilometres (93 mi) long by the same width, consisted of several small-scale chiefdoms including the Otavalo, Caranqui, Cayambe, and Cochasquí. These chiefdoms appear to have been similar in artistic techniques, subsistence, settlement patterns, and language, probably all speaking Barbacoan languages. The four chiefdoms collectively had an estimated pre-Inca population of 100,000 to 180,000.

The Otavalo and other Andean people of northern Ecuador are often identified with the pre-Columbian Cara people and Cara culture and as descendants of the semi-mythical Quitu culture, whence comes the name of the Ecuadorian capital of Quito.

The Otavalo area was densely populated. The Otavalo people practiced irrigation agriculture and constructed camelones or Waru Waru raised fields to regulate the supply of water for crops. Maize, potatoes and, at lower and warmer altitudes, coca and other tropical and sub-tropical crops were important products. Domesticated guinea pigs were an important source of animal protein, as was wild game such as deer. Prior to the Incas, the Otavalo apparently did not possess domesticated llamas and alpacas as did Andean peoples further south in Peru and Bolivia.

The brief period of Inca rule apparently did not change Otavalo culture much. Contrary to Incan practice, few if any mitma (people forcibly resettled outside their homelands by the Incas) were moved into the Otavalo region. Also contrary to the Incas who used the vertical archipelago to exchange goods among regions, a class of long-range traders called mindaláes continued to operate among the Otavalo. The mindaláes appear to have operated outside the authority of the chiefdoms. They carried on trade with the people living in lower elevations on the western slopes of the Andes, especially in the Mira River valley, about 75 kilometres (47 mi) north of the city of Otavalo. Products they brought to the highlands included cotton, coca, salt, and dried fish from the Pacific coast.

=== Spanish rule ===
The Spanish conquered the Inca Empire in the 1530s and Spanish settlement began. The Inca and Spanish conquests and the Spanish rule of the Otavalo and other nearby chiefdoms, plus recurrent epidemics of European diseases, had a profound impact on the population. By 1582, the population of the northern Ecuador Andean region was estimated to have declined by 80 percent to an estimated 30,000. The Spanish put heavy demands on the Otavalo people for labor. One-fifth of the Otavalo were required to work, essentially as slave labor, for the Spanish, often in hot tropical climates to which they were not accustomed. Vineyards owned by the Dominican Order of the Catholic church were characterized as "fields of blood" because of the Otavalo laborers who died working there.

=== Present day ===
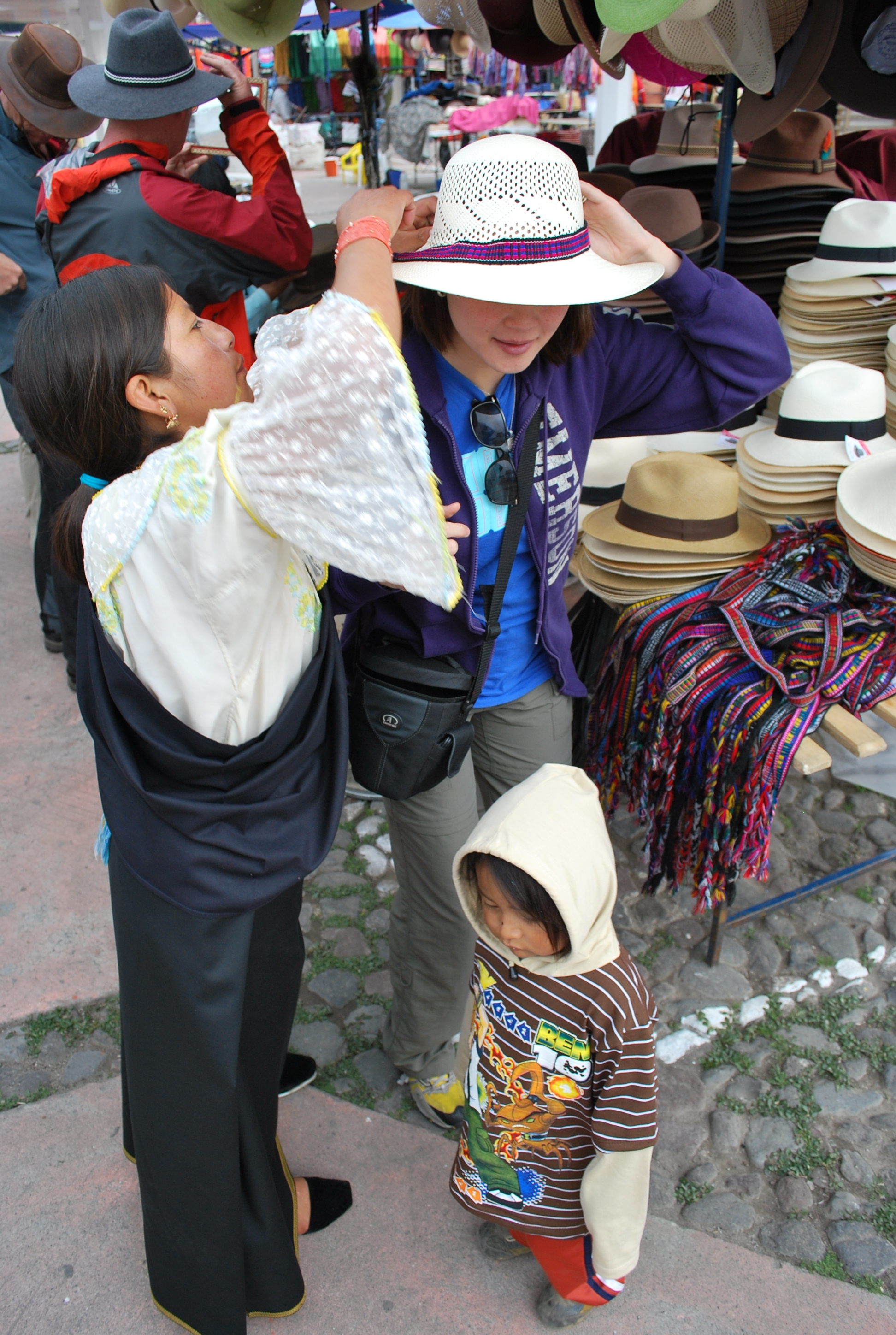
An Otavaleña in traditional dress works with a customer in the open-air market in Otavalo, Ecuador.

Unlike many others the Otavalo survived as a distinct ethnic group, but sometime after the 16th century they lost their original language and henceforth spoke Kichwa, the Quechua dialect spoken in Ecuador, and Spanish.

In 1990, the number of Otavalo people was estimated at 45,000 to 50,000 in the Otavalo area with another 5,000 to 8,000 living elsewhere in Ecuador or other countries.

== Economy ==
Most Otavalo are subsistence farmers who cultivate crops like potatoes but also raise livestock. Some work in the textile industry where many traditional Otavalo-styled textiles (woven with alpaca or llama wool) are exported to North America. A few Otavalo are businessmen or women who run some of these textile operations. Tourism is another significant source of revenue as these outsiders are attracted to the area because of the culture and local dress of the people.

== Notable people ==
- Blanca Chancoso (born 1955), Otavalo leader and educator
