= Otavalo (city) =

- Town
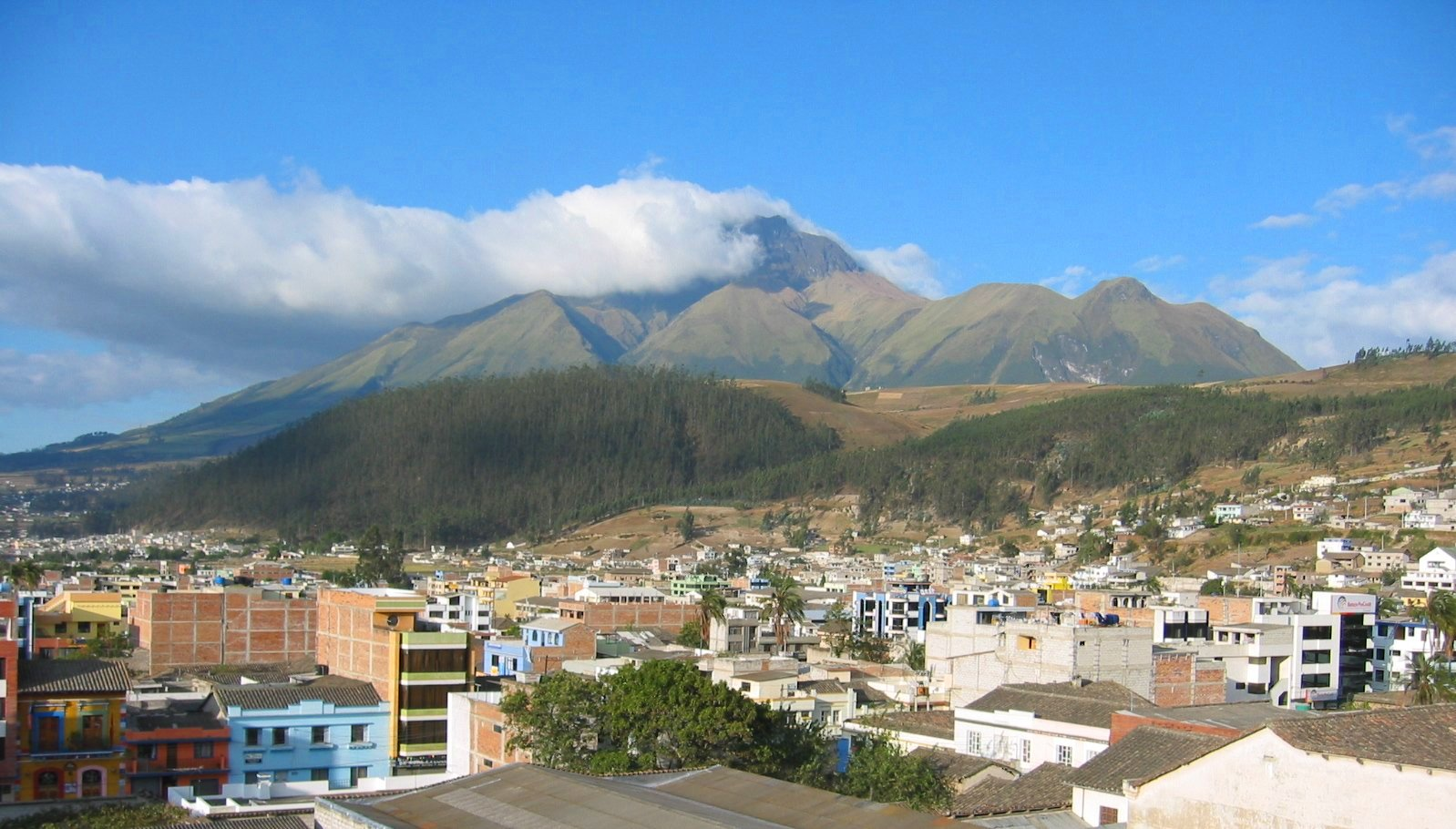
- Otavalo with Imbabura in the background

- Location within Ecuador
- Coordinates: 0°13′49″N 78°15′45″W
- Country: Ecuador
- Province: Imbabura
- Canton: Otavalo Canton

Area
  - Town: 11.68 km^{2} (4.51 sq mi)
- Elevation: 2,532 m (8,307 ft)

Population (2022 census)
  - Town: 41,718
  - Density: 3,572/km^{2} (9,251/sq mi)
- Time zone: UTC-5 (ECT)
- Climate: Cfb

Otavalo, capital of Otavalo Canton, has a population largely made up of the Otavalo indigenous group. It is located in Imbabura Province of Ecuador. According to the 2022 census, the town had a population of 41,718 and is situated at an elevation of 2,532 metres (8,307 ft). It is surrounded by the peaks of Imbabura (4,630 metres (15,190 ft)), Cotacachi (4,995 metres (16,388 ft)), and Mojanda volcanoes. Mario Conejo is the current mayor of the city of Otavalo.

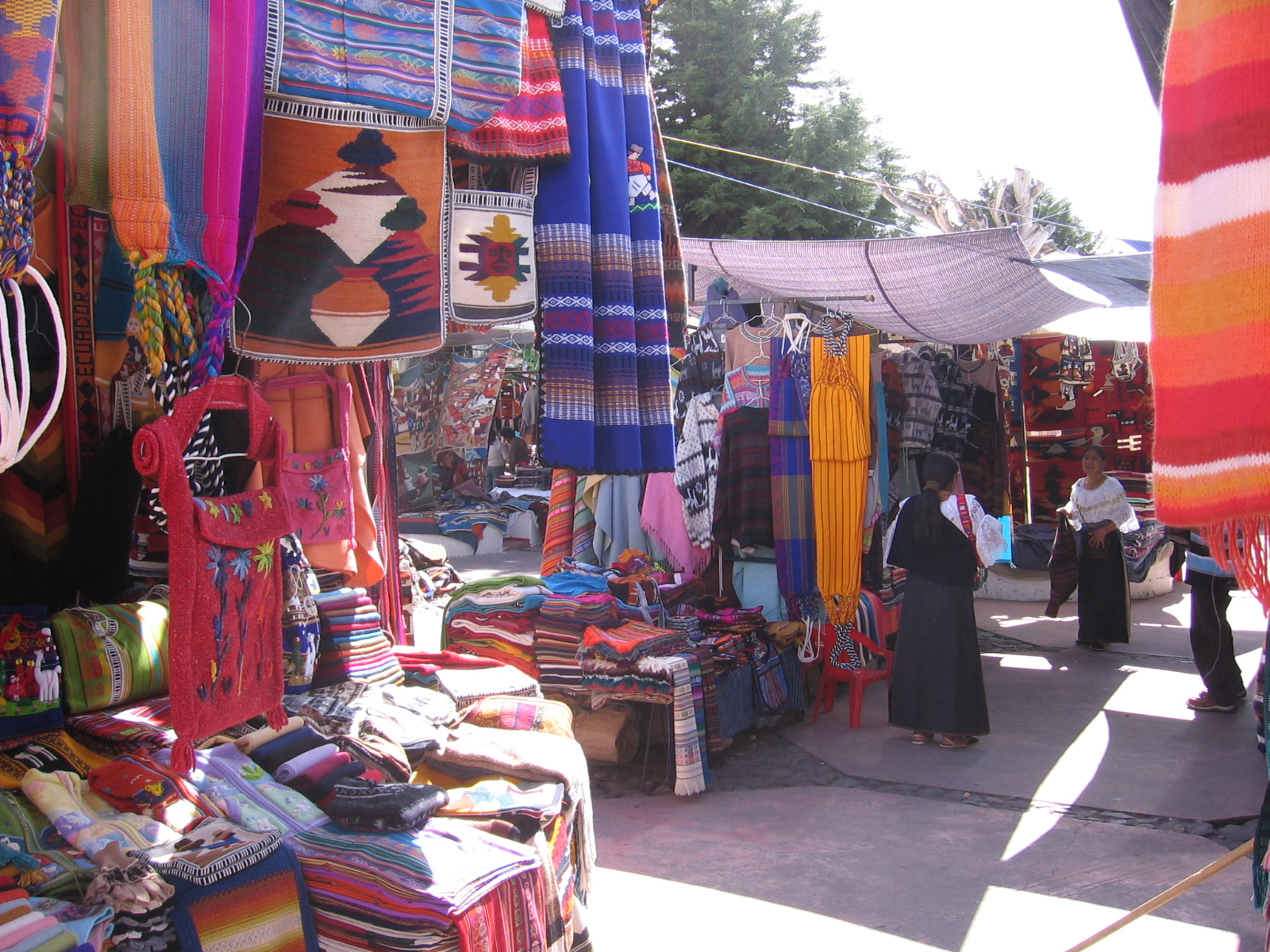
The Saturday market in Otavalo, showing the colorful fabrics

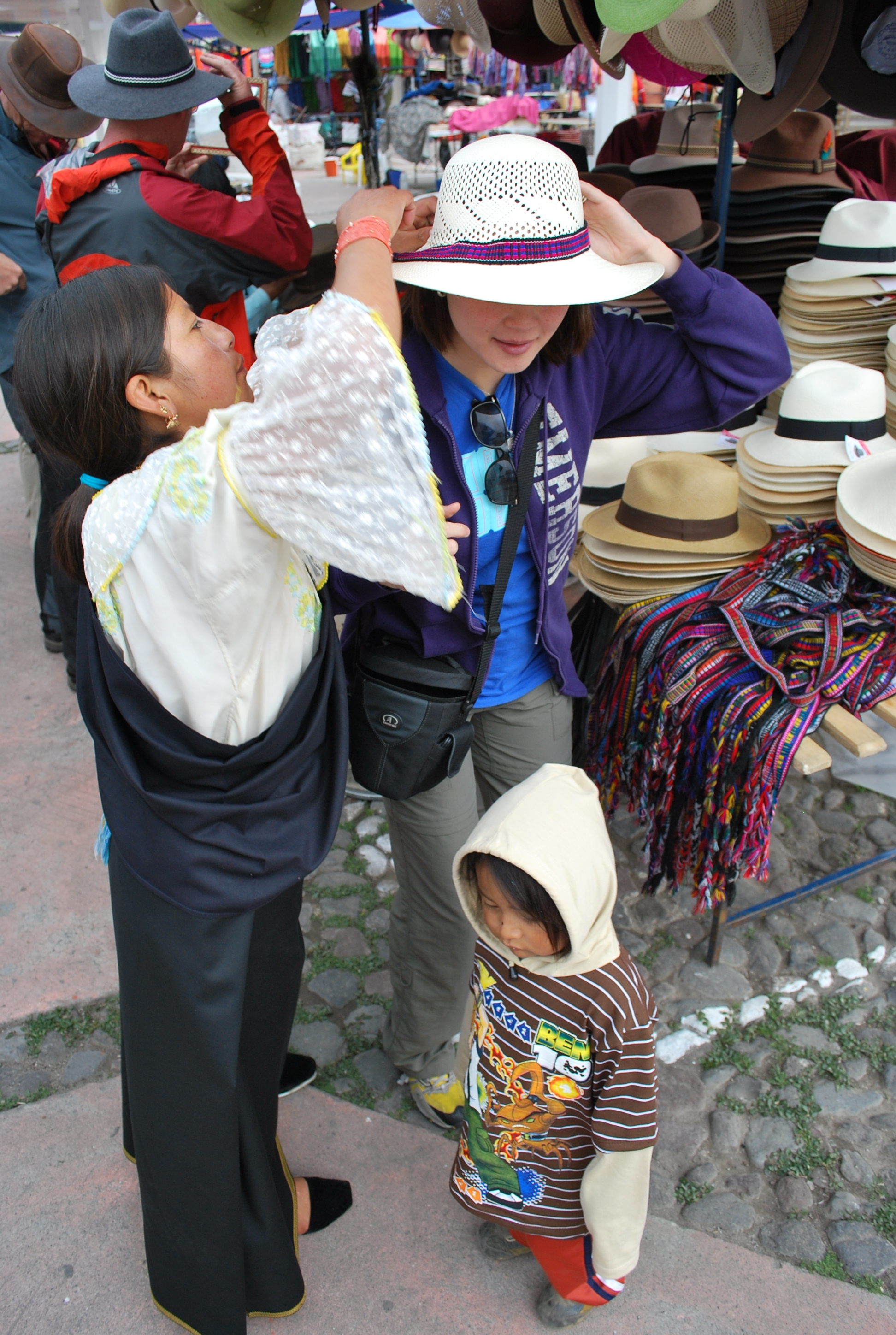
An Otavaleña in traditional dress works with a customer in the open-air market in Otavalo

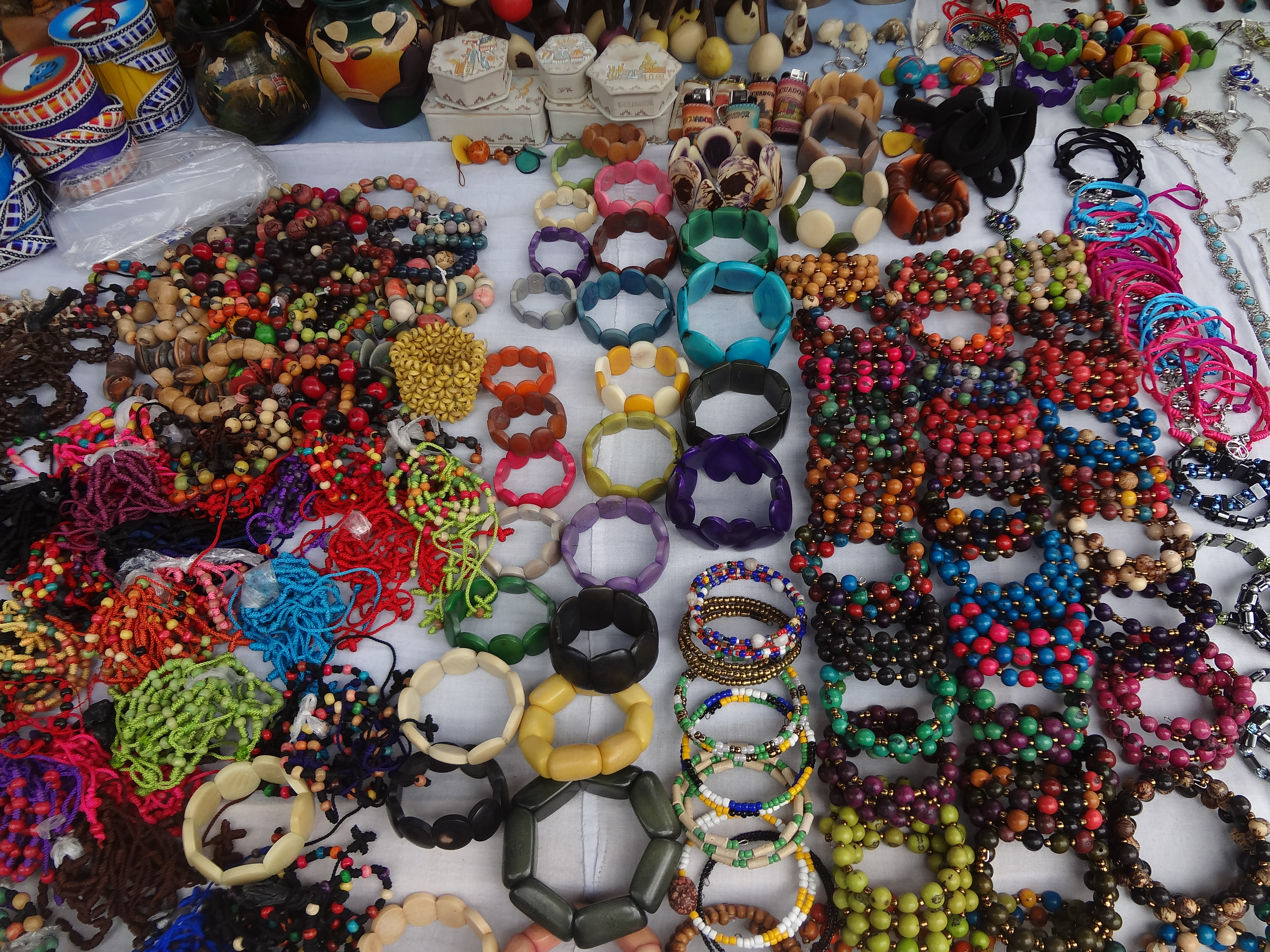
Tawa Jewelry and other handcrafts at the Otavalo Artisan Market

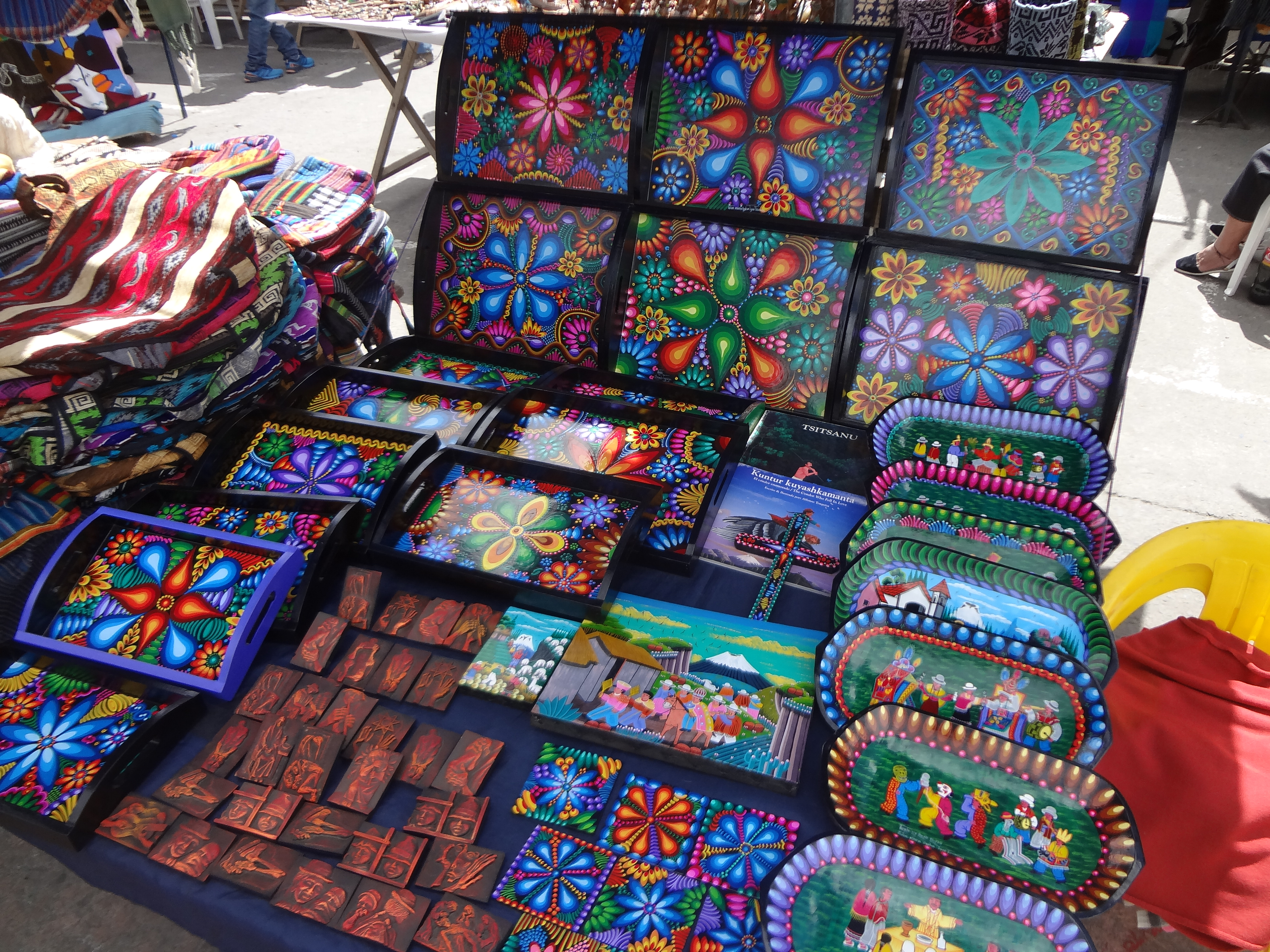
Hand painted crafts at the Otavalo Artisan Market

== The market ==
The indigenous Otavalo people are famous for weaving textiles, usually made of wool, which are sold at the famous Saturday market. Although the largest market is on Saturday, there is a very wide range of wares available throughout the week in the Plaza de los Ponchos, and the many local shops. The shops sell textiles such as handmade blankets, tablecloths, and much more.

The Otavalo market consists of mushroom-shaped concrete umbrellas with benches. The market was designed and built in 1970 by Dutch architect Tonny Zwollo.

During the market's peak, almost one third of the town becomes full of stalls selling textiles, tagua nut jewelry, musical instruments, dream catchers, leather goods, fake shrunken heads, indigenous costumes, hand-painted platters and trays, purses, clothing, spices, raw foods and spools of wool. As the city has become more of a tourist attraction, many of the goods sold in the markets are mass-produced in nearby factories and sold in the market by middle-men. More artisan products can be purchased in neighboring communities or at the Museo Viviente Otavalango.

Otavalo was an area made up principally of farming communities due to the rich volcanic soils in this area, but with the growth of tourism, the town has begun to focus more on the making of handicrafts which have made the Saturday market a popular stop with visitors to Ecuador. Tourism has become the town's main industry and as a result there are many more hotels, hostels, and tour operators than other similarly sized Ecuadorian towns, such as nearby Cayambe. Further, Otavaleño (people from Otavalo) have had notable success selling their goods abroad.

As Otavalo is famous for its textiles, many of the nearby villages and towns are famous for their own particular crafts. Cotacachi, for example, is the center of Ecuador's leather industry. In San Antonio, where the local specialty is wood carving, the main street prominently displays carved statues, picture frames, and furniture.

== Attractions ==
Many people come to Otavalo to visit the market, but the city and surrounding area is also home to the Peguche Waterfall, Lagos de Mojanda, and Museo Viviente Otavalango. The museum is located in the "antigua fabrica San Pedro," where indigenous Otavaleños worked in sweatshop style labor for generations under brutal conditions. After the factory was shut down, a group of locals purchased the land and have since reclaimed the factory and its grounds as a living museum and community space for the indigenous community. The museum shows aspects of Otavaleño life both historically and in present day, and allows visitors to interact with the indigenous craftspeople making textiles and farming. The museum also serves as a community space, with concerts, weddings, and community meetings held in buildings on the grounds. In addition, a short taxi ride or hike from town you will find Parque Condor, a bird rescue centre and educational facility. Aiming to educate locals and tourists about the conservation of wild birds, they offer a daily flight display to view some of the birds in flight.

Traditional gastronomy is a growing tourist attraction.

== Traditional clothing ==
Otavaleña women traditionally wear distinctive white embroidered blouses, with flared lace sleeves, and black or dark over skirts, with cream or white under skirts. Long hair is tied back with a 30 cm band of woven multi coloured material, often matching the band which is wound several times round their waists. They usually have many strings of gold beads around their necks, with the number of strands and thickness of beads representing their age and wisdom, and matching tightly wound long strings of coral beads around each wrist. Men wear white trousers, and dark blue ponchos.

== Music ==
Otavalo is also known for its traditional music and musicians. Every June the music of Otavalo, and the surrounding areas, plays a primary role in the indigenous festival for the southern winter solstice, called Inti Raymi. There are many musical groups currently traveling around the world promoting their music (sometimes known as Andean New Age). This style of music has had notable commercial success worldwide.

== Architecture ==
Otavalo is very famous for its market but it has to offer various sightworthy buildings as well. Parque Bolívar, a well-kept park, is the central square of Otavalo. Sometimes it is called Parque Central as well. It is surrounded by a very representative City Hall (Edificio Municipal) and by a catholic church, Iglesia de San Luís, with an octagonal clocktower. The church was originally built 1676–79 with just one nave, but it was destroyed by an earthquake in 1868 and rebuilt 1880–1890 in a renaissance style with three naves and an apse. In the interior there are many pieces of art and a baroque altar dating from 1869.

Iglesia El Jordán is another remarkable church with three naves which was built in 1775 and heavily damaged by earthquakes in 1868 and in 1906. Reconstruction was not started before 1925 and was interrupted several times. In 1964 the reconstruction in a renaissance and Greek style was completed. The façade and the two clocktowers have several columns with Corinthian capitals.

The railway station is in the southern part of the town center behind Copacabana Market, 2,532 metres (8,307 ft) above sea level. The station was renovated when the railway line (27 km) from Otavalo to Ibarra which had been closed down about 1980 was reinaugurated for tourist purposes in 2015. Travelling by train from Otavalo to Ibarra has become an important tourist attraction.

== Climate ==
Climate data for Otavalo, elevation 2,556 m (8,386 ft), (1971–2000)
Month	Jan	Feb	Mar	Apr	May	Jun	Jul	Aug	Sep	Oct	Nov	Dec	Year
Mean daily maximum °C (°F)	20.0 (68.0)	19.9 (67.8)	20.1 (68.2)	19.9 (67.8)	20.4 (68.7)	20.3 (68.5)	19.9 (67.8)	20.1 (68.2)	20.4 (68.7)	20.5 (68.9)	20.6 (69.1)	19.4 (66.9)	20.1 (68.2)
Mean daily minimum °C (°F)	8.4 (47.1)	7.9 (46.2)	8.4 (47.1)	8.9 (48.0)	8.8 (47.8)	8.5 (47.3)	7.6 (45.7)	7.3 (45.1)	7.6 (45.7)	8.5 (47.3)	9.1 (48.4)	8.8 (47.8)	8.3 (47.0)
Average precipitation mm (inches)	62.0 (2.44)	86.0 (3.39)	90.0 (3.54)	110.0 (4.33)	72.0 (2.83)	36.0 (1.42)	17.0 (0.67)	26.0 (1.02)	54.0 (2.13)	92.0 (3.62)	107.0 (4.21)	62.0 (2.44)	814 (32.04)
Average relative humidity (%)	83	84	83	83	83	85	82	80	79	82	82	82	82
Source: FAO

== Gallery ==
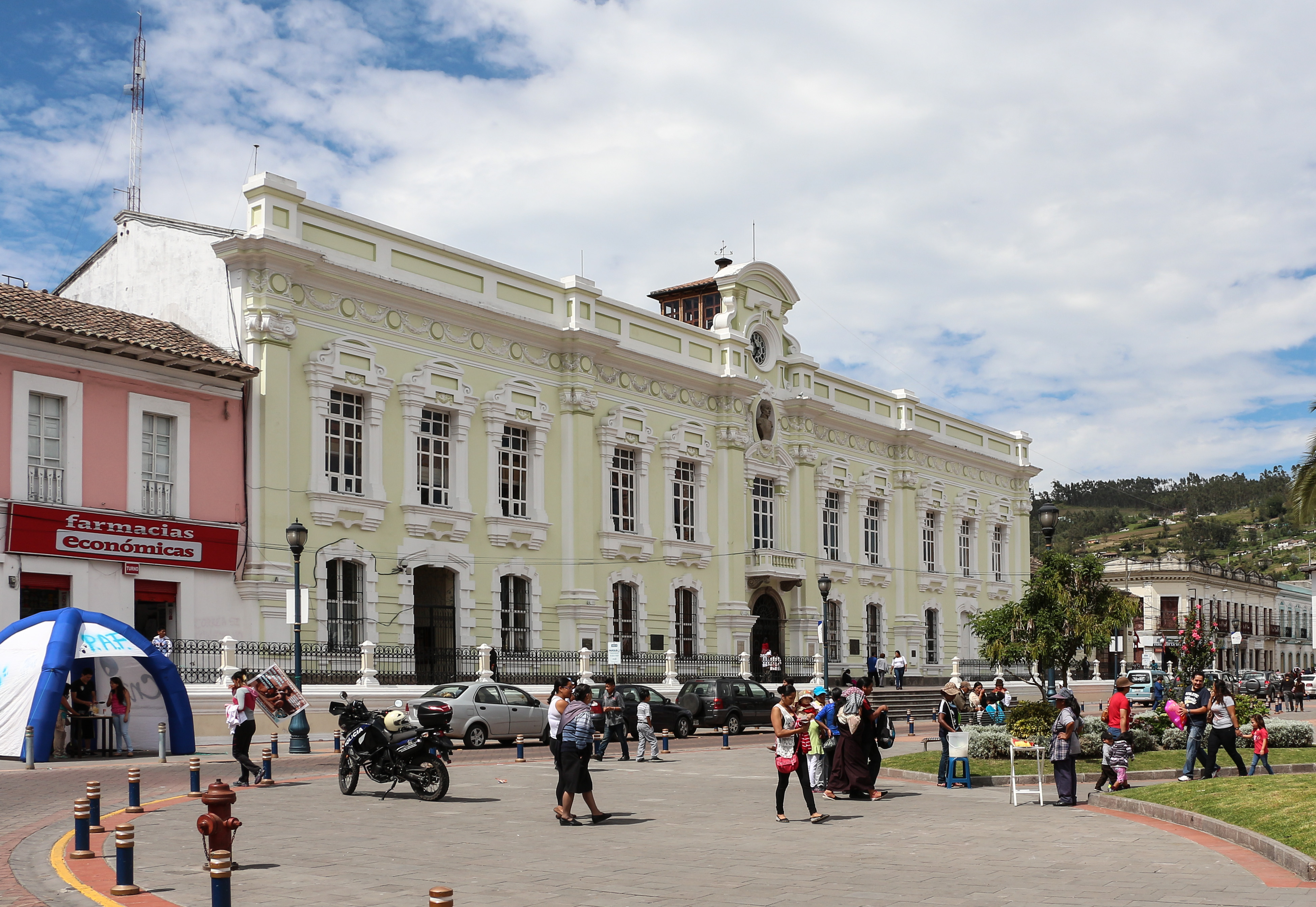
City hall of Otavalo

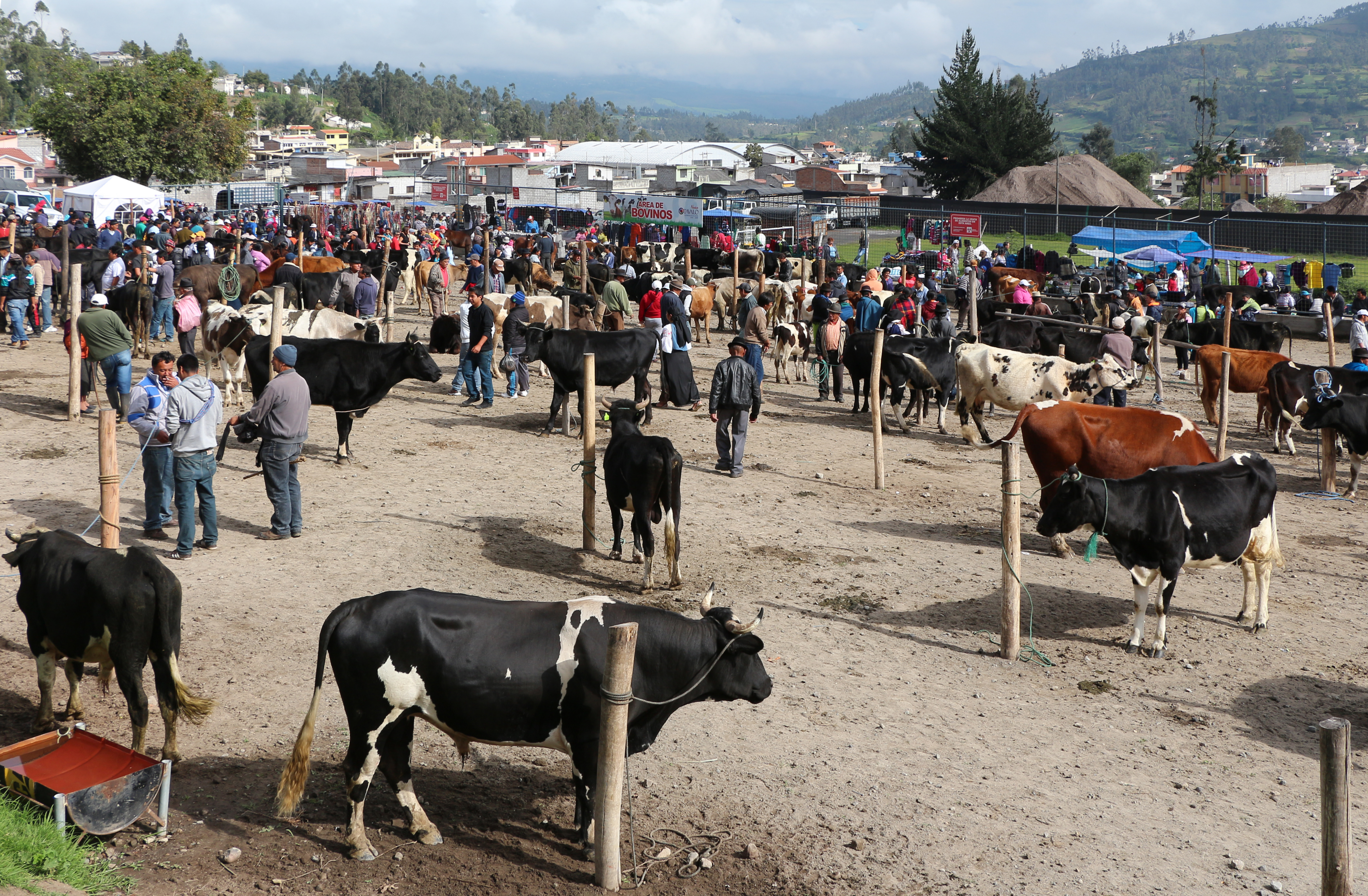
Livestock market of Otavalo

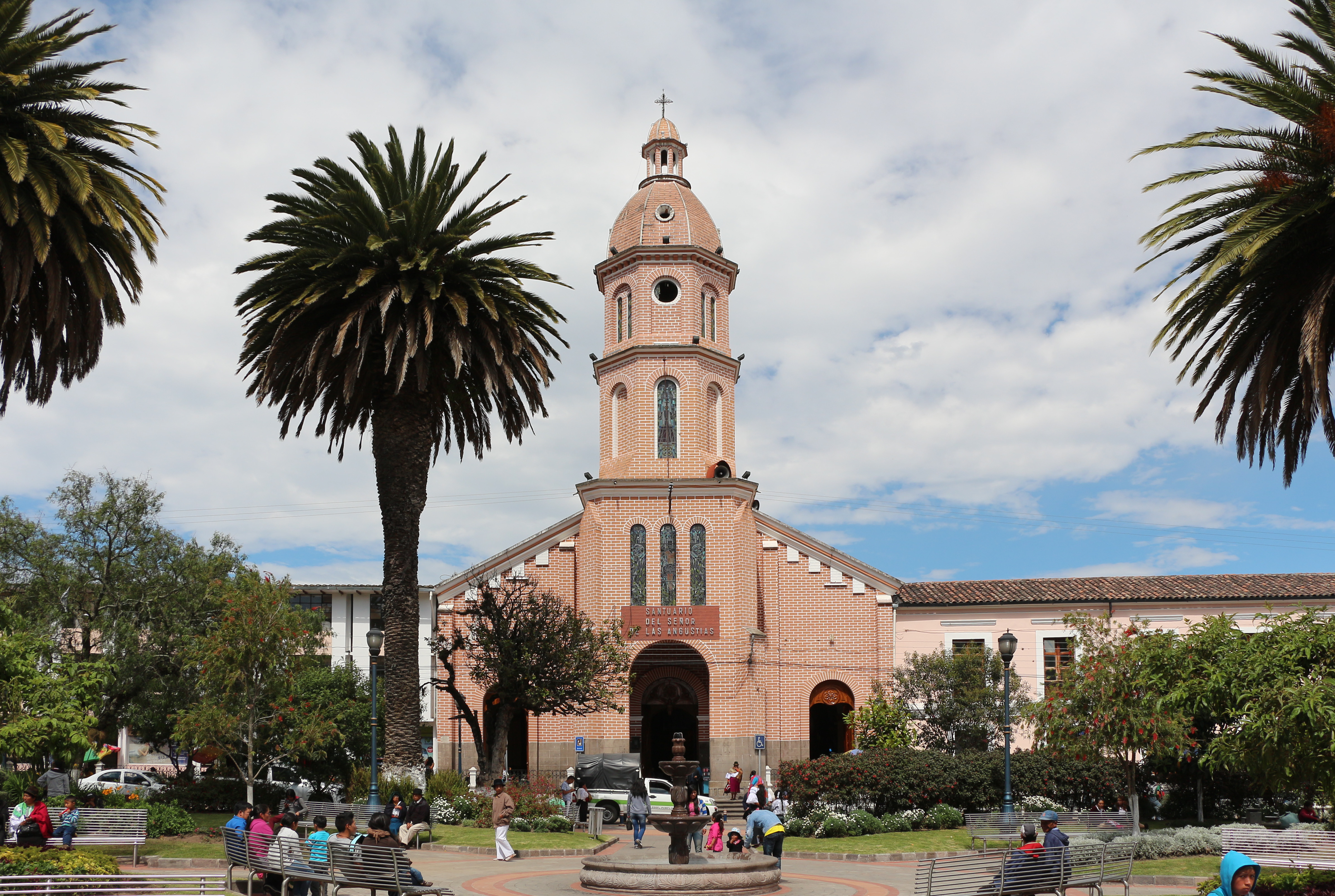
Iglesia San Luis

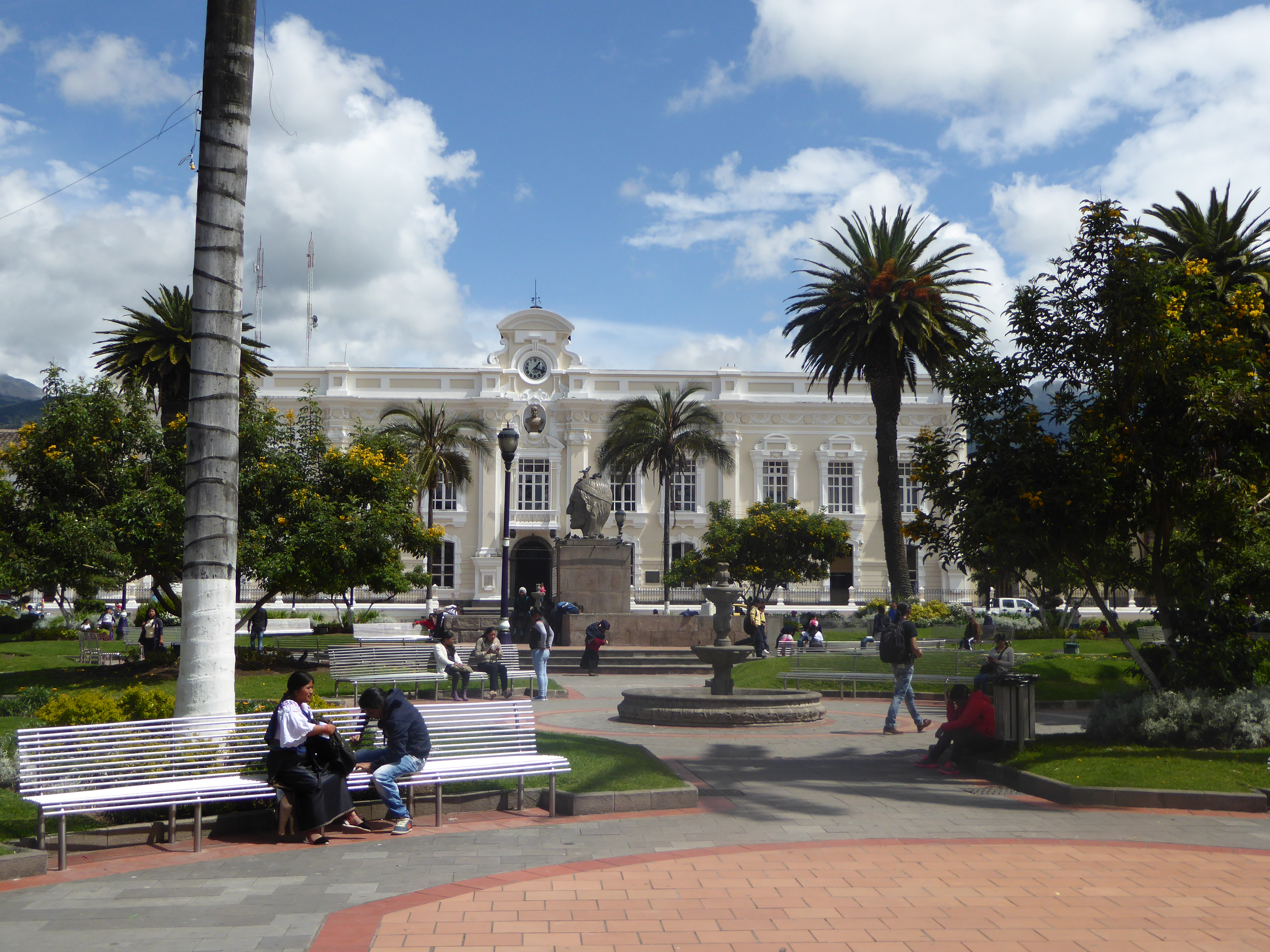
Parque Central

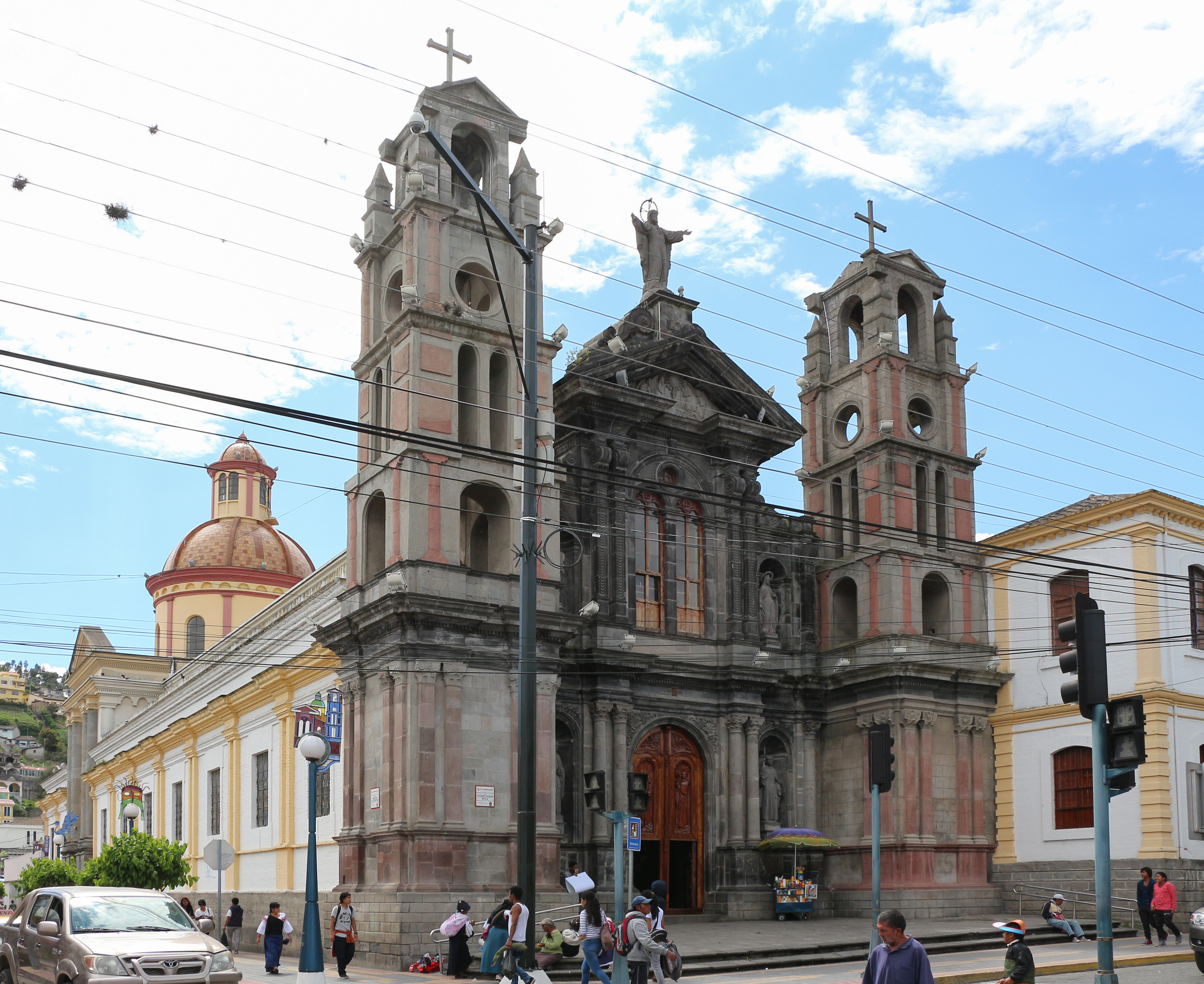
Iglesia El Jordán

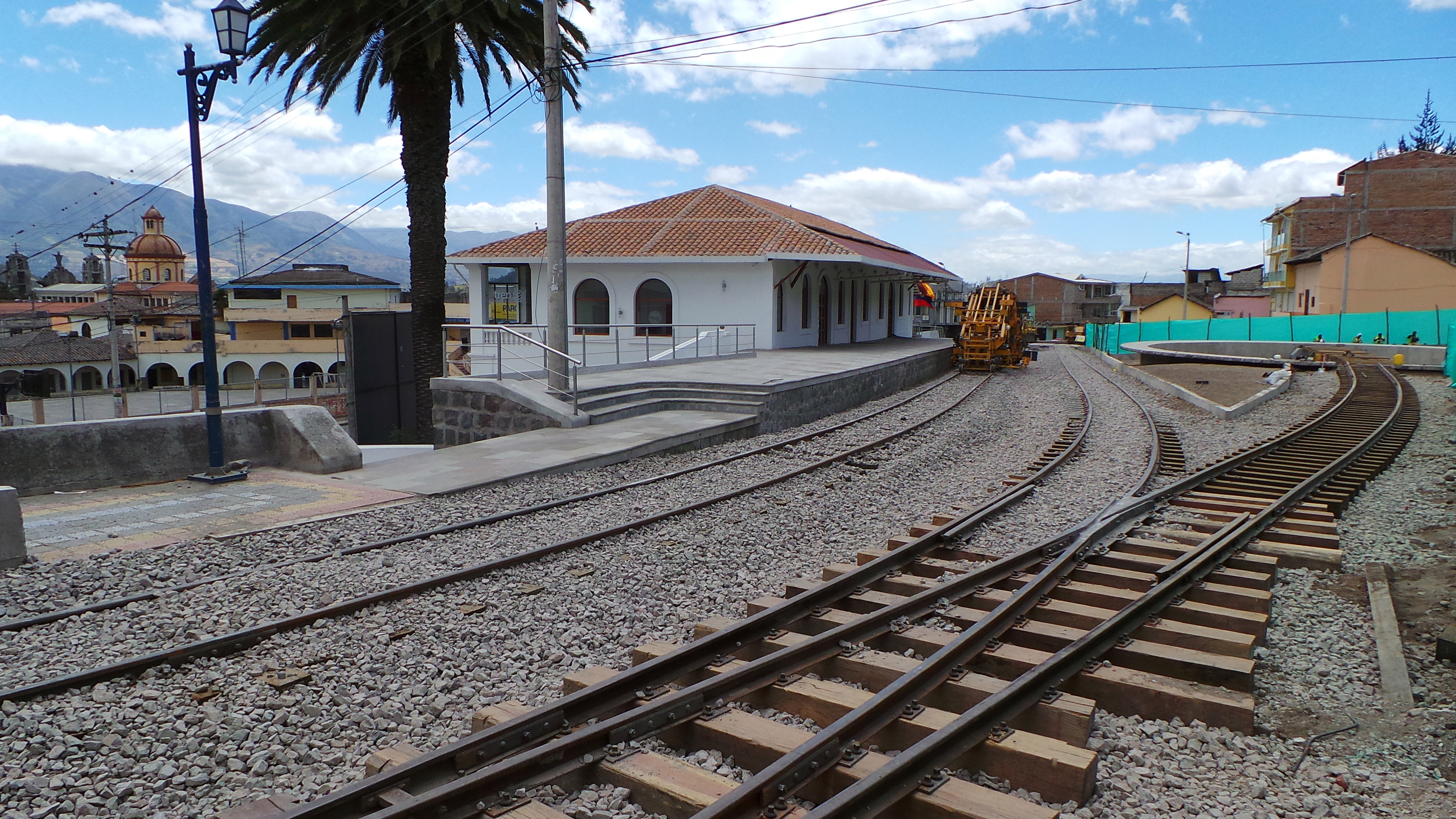
Railway Station

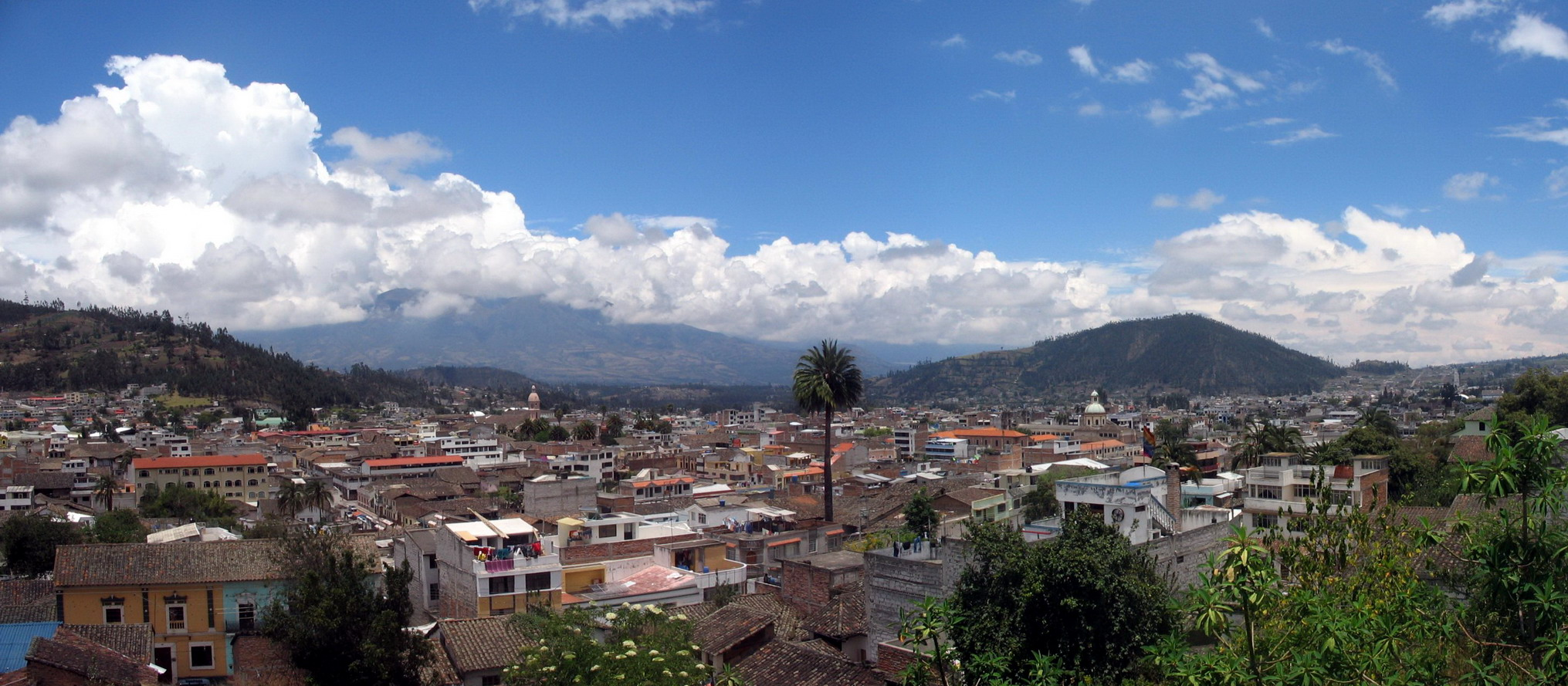
Otavalo as seen from the east
