= San José de Sisa =

- Town
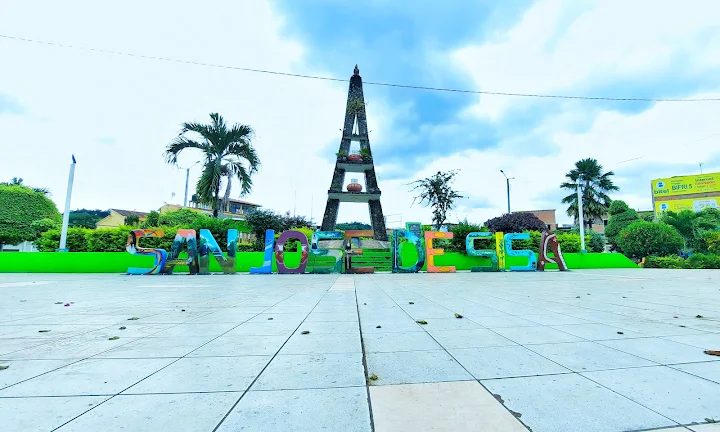
- Nickname: La hermosa flor (The beautiful flower)
- Location within Peru
- Coordinates: 06°36′51″S 76°41′37″W
- Country: Peru
- Region: San Martín
- Province: El Dorado
- District: San José de Sisa
- Founded: 25 November 1876

Government
  - Mayor: Francisco Satalaya Castillo
- Elevation: 600 m (2,000 ft)

Population (2017)
  - Total: 14,639
- Time zone: UTC-5 (PET)

San José de Sisa is a town in Northern Peru, capital of the province El Dorado in the region San Martín. Founded under Decree 7848 on 25 November 1876, it was designated the capital of its district on 16 October 1933. On 8 December 1992, it became the capital of El Dorado Province under Decree 25931.
