= Chachapoyas Quechua =

Quechua variety of Peru

- Amazonas Quechua
- Native to: Peru
- Native speakers: (500 cited 1993)
- Language family: Quechua: Quechua II; Northern; Lowland Peruvian; Chachapoyas Quechua

Language codes
- ISO 639-3: quk
- Glottolog: chac1250
- ELP: Chachapoyas Quechua
- Linguasphere: 84-FAA-dc

Chachapoyas or Amazonas Quechua is a variety of Quechua spoken in the provinces of Chachapoyas and Luya in the Peruvian region of Amazonas.

Chachapoyas Quechua is endangered, as hardly any children are now learning it. Conila is said to be the last village where children are still able to speak it.

Chachapoyas Quechua belongs to Quechua II, subgroup II-B (Lowland Peruvian Quechua).

Unusually for the Quechuan language family, Chachapoyas Quechua speakers place stress on the initial syllable. This may have led to its characteristic reduction of unstressed vowels. Urban (2021) proposes that a prior “Cholonoid” language spoken in the Chachapoyas Quechua area may have influenced speakers' stress patterns and vocabulary as a substrate.

== Bibliography ==
- Gerald Taylor, 2006. Diccionario Quechua Chachapoyas-Lamas (– Castellano)
