= Kichwa language =

Quechuan language of Ecuador and Colombia

Kichwa
- Kichwa Shimi, Runa Shimi
- Native to: Ecuador, Colombia, Peru
- Ethnicity: Quechua
- Native speakers: 450,000 (2008–2012)
- Language family: Quechuan: Quechua II; Northern; Kichwa

Official status
- Recognised minority language in: Ecuador

Language codes
- ISO 639-3: Variously: inb – Highland Inga inj – Jungle Inga qvo – Napo Lowland qup – Southern Pastaza qud – Calderón Highland qxr – Cañar Highland qug – Chimborazo Highland qvi – Imbabura Highland qvj – Loja Highland qvz – Northern Pastaza qxl – Salasaca Highland quw – Tena Lowland
- Glottolog: colo1257
- ELP: Lowland Ecuadorian Quichua; Loja Quichua
- Linguasphere: 84-FAA-a
- 84-FAA-b
- 84-FAA-c
- Distribution of the Kichwa language.

Kichwa (Kichwa shimi, Runashimi, also Spanish Quichua) is a Quechuan language that includes all Quechua varieties of Ecuador and Colombia (Inga), as well as extensions into Peru. It has an estimated half million speakers.

== Classification ==
Kichwa, along with Lamas and Chachapoyas, make up the Northern Quechua group of Quechua II, according to linguist Alfredo Torero.

== History ==
The earliest grammatical description of Kichwa was written in the 17th century by Jesuit priest Hernando de Alcocer.

=== Language standardization and bilingual education ===
A standardized language, with a unified orthography (Kichwa Unificado, Shukyachiska Kichwa), has been developed. It is similar to Chimborazo but lacks some of the phonological peculiarities of that dialect.

According to linguist Arturo Conejo Muyulema, the first steps to teach Kichwa in public schools dates to the 1940s, when Dolores Cacuango founded several indigenous schools in Cayambe. Later, indigenous organizations initiated self-governed schools to provide education in Kichwa in the 1970s and 1980s.

Muyulema says that the creation of literary works such as Caimi Ñucanchic Shimuyu-Panca, Ñucanchic Llactapac Shimi, Ñucanchic Causaimanta Yachaicuna, and Antisuyu-Punasuyu provided the catalysts for the standardization of Kichwa. This was initiated by DINEIB (National Board of Intercultural Bilingual Education).

Afterward a new alphabet was created by ALKI (Kichwan Language Academy). It comprises 21 characters; including three vowels (a, i, u); two semi-vowels (w, y); and 16 consonants (ch, h, k, l, ll, m, n, ñ, p, r, s, sh, t, ts, z, zh).

Later, the bigger and much more comprehensive dictionary Kichwa Yachakukkunapa Shimiyuk Kamu was published in 2009 by the linguist Fabián Potosí, together with other scholars sponsored by the Ministry of Education of Ecuador.

== Dialects ==
The most widely spoken dialects are Chimborazo, Imbabura and Cañar Highland Quechua, with most of the speakers.

The missionary organization FEDEPI (2006) lists eight dialects of Quechua in Ecuador, which it illustrates with "The men will come in two days." Ethnologue 16 (2009) lists nine, distinguishing Cañar from Loja Highland Quechua. Below are the comparisons, along with Standard (Ecuadorian) Kichwa and Standard (Southern) Quechua:

Dialect	ISO code	Speakers per SIL (FEDEPI)	Orthography (SIL or official) + Pronunciation
Imbabura	[qvi]	300,000 (1,000,000)	Chai jaricunaca ishcai punllapillami shamunga. /tʃaj xarikunaka iʃkaj punʒapiʒami ʃamuŋga/
Calderón (Pichincha)	[qud]	25,000	Chai jaricunaca ishcai punllapillami shamunga. /tʃaj xarikunaka iʃkaj punʒapiʒami ʃamuŋga/
Salasaca	[qxl]	15,000	Chi c'arigunaga ishqui p'unllallabimi shamunga. /tʃi kʰarigunaga iʃki pʰunʒaʒabimi ʃamuŋga/
Chimborazo	[qug]	1,000,000 (2,500,000)	Chai c'aricunaca ishqui punllallapimi shamunga. /tʃaj kʰarikunaka iʃki punʒaʒapimi ʃamuŋga/
Cañar–Loja	[qxr] [qvj]	(200,000) qxr: 100,000 qxl: 15,000	Chai c'aricunaca ishcai punzhallapimi shamunga. /tʃaj kʰarikunaka iʃkaj punʒaλapimi ʃamuŋga/
Tena Lowland	[quw]	5,000 (10,000)	Chi cariunaga ishqui punzhallaimi shamunga. /tʃi kariunaga iʃki punʒaλaimi ʃamuŋga/
Napo Lowland	[qvo]	4,000 Ecu. & 8,000 Peru (15,000)	Chi carigunaga ishcai punchallaimi shamunga. /tʃi karigunaga iʃkaj puntʃaλaimi ʃamunga/
Northern Pastaza	[qvz]	4,000 Ecu. & 2,000 Peru (10,000)	Chi carigunaga ishcai punzhallaimi shamunga. /tʃi karigunaga iʃkaj punʒallaimi ʃamunga/
Standard Kichwa			Chay karikunaka ishkay punllallapimi shamunka.
Southern Quechua (Qhichwa, Collao variant)	[quz]		Chay qharikunaqa iskay p'unchawllapim hamunqa. /tʃæj qʰarikunaqa iskæj p'untʃawllapim hamunqa/

== Phonology ==
=== Consonants ===
In contrast to other regional varieties of Quechua, Kichwa does not distinguish between the original (Proto-Quechuan) /k/ and /q/, which are both pronounced [k]. [e] and [o], the allophones of the vowels /i/ and /u/ near /q/, do not exist. Kiru can mean both "tooth" (kiru in Southern Quechua) and "wood" (qiru [qero] in Southern Quechua), and killa can mean both "moon" (killa) and "lazy" (qilla [qeʎa]).

Imbabura Kichwa consonants
		Bilabial	Alveolar	Post-alv./ Palatal	Velar	Glottal
Nasal		m	n	ɲ	(ŋ)	
Stop	voiceless	p	t		k	
Stop	aspirated	pʰ	tʰ		kʰ	
Stop	voiced				ɡ	
Affricate			ts	tʃ		
Fricative	voiceless	ɸ	s	ʃ		h
Fricative	voiced		(z)	ʒ		
Approximant	median			j	w	
Approximant	lateral		l	ʎ		
Rhotic			ɾ			

- /z/ only occurs rarely phonemically, and is mostly an allophone of /s/.
- Affricates /ts, tʃ/, are often voiced after nasal sounds as [dz, dʒ].
- /ɸ/ is often heard as [f] before a front vowel /i/.
- /ɾ, w/, are in free variation with fricatives [ʐ, β]. A combination /nɾ/ is realized as [ɳɖʐ].

=== Vowels ===
	Front	Back
Close	i iː	u uː
Open	a aː	

- /a, i, u/ can become lax as [ə, ɪ, ʊ] in free variation.

== Grammar ==
Kichwa in both Ecuador and Colombia has lost possessive and bidirectional suffixes (verbal suffixes indicating both subject and object), as well as the distinction between the exclusive and inclusive first person plural:

- Instead of yayayku / taytayku ("Our Father", the Lord's Prayer) Kichwa people say ñukanchik yaya / ñukanchik tayta.
- In Kichwa, you do not say suyayki ("I wait for you"), but kanta shuyani.

=== Syntax ===
Kichwa syntax has undergone some grammatical simplification compared to Southern Quechua, perhaps because of partial creolization with the pre-Inca languages of Ecuador.

== Vocabulary ==
As in all Quechuan languages, the words for 'brother' and 'sister' differ depending on to whom they refer. There are four different words for siblings: ñaña (sister of a woman), turi (brother of a woman), pani (sister of a man), and wawki (brother of a man). A woman reading "Ñuka wawki Pedromi kan" would read aloud Ñuka turi Pedromi kan (if she referred to her brother). If Pedro has a brother Manuel and the sisters Sisa and Elena, their mother could refer to Pedro as Manuelpak wawki or Sisapaj turi, and to Sisa as Manuelpak pani or as Elenapak ñaña.

== Media ==
=== Music ===
A band from Ecuador, "Los Nin", which raps in Kichwa and Spanish, has toured internationally. The band hails from the town of Otavalo, which is known for its traditional music.

The Ecuadorian band "Yarina", which sings in Kichwa and Spanish, won Best World Music Recording with their album "Nawi" in the 2005 Native American Music Awards.

In the Ecuadorian diaspora, the radio station Kichwa Hatari works to revive use of the Kichwa language, music, and culture in the United States.

== Bibliography ==
- Ciucci, Luca; Muysken, Pieter C. (2011). "Hernando de Alcocer y la Breve declaración del Arte de la lengua del Ynga. El más antiguo manuscrito de quichua de Ecuador". Indiana (in Spanish). 28: 359–393. doi:10.18441/ind.v28i0.359-393. hdl:2066/94456.
- Conejo Muyulema, Arturo (2013). "Presente y futuro de la lengua quichua desde la perspectiva de la experiencia vasca (Kichwa sisariy ñan)". In Haboud, Marleen; Ostler, Nicholas (eds.). Voces e Imagenes de las Lenguas en Peligro (in Spanish) (1st ed.). Abya-Yala. pp. 234–235. ISBN 9789942091376.
