= Gonzanamá Canton =

Canton in Loja, Peru

Coordinates: 4°13′53″S 79°26′7″W

- Canton
- Location of Loja Province in Ecuador

- Gonzanamá Canton in Loja Province
- Country: Ecuador
- Province: Loja Province

Area
  - Total: 681.9 km^{2} (263.3 sq mi)

Population (2022 census)
  - Total: 12,247
  - Density: 17.96/km^{2} (46.52/sq mi)

Gonzanamá is a canton in the Province of Loja, Ecuador. It is located in the south-east of the province, bordered by the cantons of Catamayo, Loja, Quilanga, Calvas, and Paltas. It is the "agricultural, farming, and craftsmanship capital of Loja." Gonzanamá Canton covers 681.9 km^{2} at an altitude of 2,045 m, with a population of 12,247. The principal town is Gonzanamá.

== Demographics ==
Ethnic groups as of the Ecuadorian census of 2010:

- Mestizo 96.7%
- White 1.6%
- Afro-Ecuadorian 1.2%
- Montubio 0.3%
- Indigenous 0.0%
- Other 0.0%

== Attractions ==
- Festivals of Buen Suceso Señor and Virgen de el Carmen - celebrated on August 20 and July 16, respectively.

Pagina Web(Blog): https://web.archive.org/web/20080409014717/http://gonzanama.ec.kz/
