= Macara (disambiguation) =

Macará is a city in Ecuador.

Macara may also refer to:

Places

- Macará Canton, a canton of Ecuador
- Macará River, which forms part of the border between Ecuador and Peru

People

- Alexander MacAra (1932-2012), British epidemiologist
- Robert Macara (1759–1815), British Army officer of the Napoleonic War era
- Macara baronets
- Nigel Macara, Australian musician, member of Ariel

Other

- Macara (moth), a genus of moth
- Club Social y Deportivo Macará, an Ecuadorian association football team

== See also ==
- McAra (disambiguation)
