= Celica Canton =

Coordinates: 4°6′9″S 79°57′16″W

- Canton
- Flag

- Location of Loja Province in Ecuador

- Celica Canton in Loja Province
- Country: Ecuador
- Province: Loja Province

Area
  - Total: 521.9 km^{2} (201.5 sq mi)

Population (2022 census)
  - Total: 14,379
  - Density: 27.55/km^{2} (71.36/sq mi)

Celica is a canton in Loja Province, Ecuador. Its seat is Celica. The canton is located in the west of the province and is bordered by the cantons of Puyango and Paltas in the north, Sozoranga in the east, Macará in the south, and Pindal and Zapotillo in the west. It covers 521.9 km^{2} at an altitude of 2,500 m.

== Demographics ==
Ethnic groups as of the Ecuadorian census of 2010:

- Mestizo 95.5%
- White 2.1%
- Afro-Ecuadorian 1.5%
- Montubio 0.6%
- Indigenous 0.2%
- Other 0.1%

== Attractions ==
- "El Pucará" Hill
- The Pillars of Quilluzara - an archaeological site of pre-Incan petroglyphs
