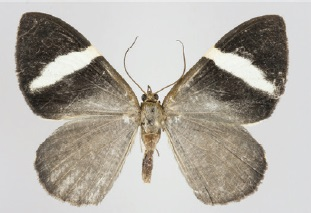
- Male
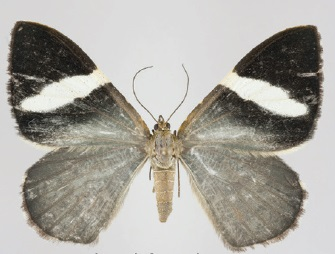
- Female

Scientific classification
- Domain: Eukaryota
- Kingdom: Animalia
- Phylum: Arthropoda
- Class: Insecta
- Order: Lepidoptera
- Family: Geometridae
- Genus: Hagnagora
- Species: H. richardi

Binomial name
- Hagnagora richardi Brehm, 2015

= Hagnagora richardi =

Species of moth

Hagnagora richardi is a species of moth of the family Geometridae first described by Gunnar Brehm in 2015. It is only known from a small region around Podocarpus National Park in Zamora-Chinchipe and Loja provinces in Ecuador.

The length of the forewings is 19 mm for males and 21 mm for females. Adults closely resemble other species of the H. anicata clade. On average it is significantly larger than Hagnagora anicata, but the female has about the same size as Hagnagora hedwigae. It is easily distinguishable from Hagnagora marionae by the cream-white colour of the blotches on the forewing.

== Etymology ==
The species is named in honour of Richard Philipp, in recognition of his and his parents' support for the taxonomy of Neotropical geometrid moths.
