= Alamor =

- Town
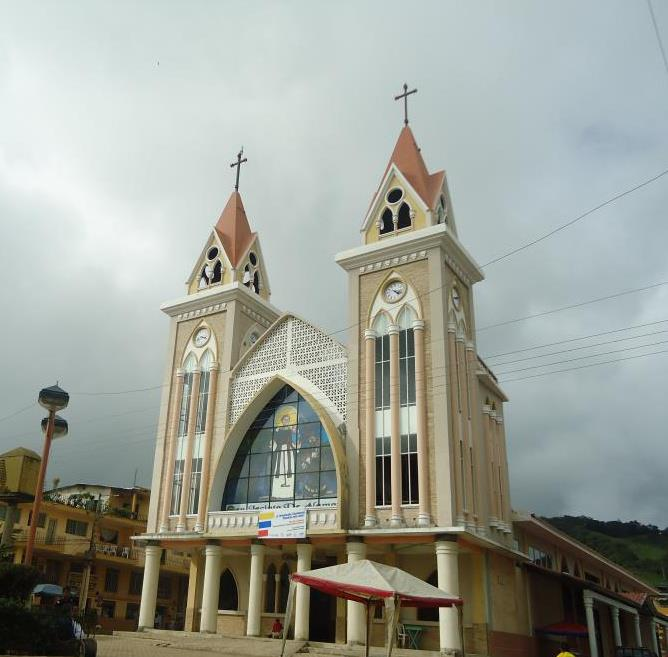
- Iglesia San Jacinto de Alamor

- Location within Ecuador
- Coordinates: 04°02′0″S 80°02′0″W
- Country: Ecuador
- Province: Loja Province
- Canton: Puyango Canton

Government
  - Mayor: Víctor Tinoco Montaño

Area
  - Town: 1.63 km^{2} (0.63 sq mi)

Population (2022 census)
  - Town: 5,981
  - Density: 3,670/km^{2} (9,500/sq mi)
- Time zone: ECT
- Climate: Aw
- Website: www.hcpl.gov.ec / Puyango Canton

Alamor is a town and the seat of the Puyango canton, province of Loja, Ecuador.

== Geographic Location ==
In the south-western province of Loja, is the canton Puyango, bordered on the north by the canton Avocados and the province of El Oro, on the south by the cantons of Celica and Pindal, east of Celica and Avocado Zapotillo and west of the Republic of Peru. Alamor is 214 km from the provincial capital and 140 km. from the city of Machala. Latitude 4'02'S Long 80'01'W Height 1380 meters above sea level Average temperature 18 °C 643 km2 area Population 16,804 inhabitants

== Political Divisions ==
Puyango has six parishes: one urban (Alamor cantonal head) and five rural: Vicentino, Mercadillo, The Limo, Ciano and El Arenal.

== Climate ==
Puyango enjoys a mild climate, warm and humid. In the lowlands the temperature reaches 26 °C, and in parts of the temperature range is between 14 °C and 18 °C

== Symbols ==
Alamors' heraldic shield is divided into four quarters, standing on them; Puyango river, the sun, the flag of the canton, farming tools and cattle. On the outside we have a range of coffee and a corn plant, the main agricultural area and a loop where will your name and date of cantonization' The flag comprises three horizontal stripes of the same dimension, their colors are: yellow on top, green in the middle and white on the bottom. Anthem: Dr. Luis Antonio Aguirre Alamor pastor is the author of the hymn to the parish Alamor. The shield and banner Puyango were approved in solemn session of January 23, 1966. In 1979 Dr. Marcelo Reyes Orellana, write the letter of the current Puyango hymn that was made official by the camera Edilicia the December 3, 1989.

== Topography ==
Two ridges protrude from Puyanguense territory: The Alamor and the Laborers in the predominantly Black and Curiachi Cerro. The mountain range of The Limo is divided into branches, Canoas, Puerto Nuevo, Banderones, Gentil and Achiral. Rivers: Puyango, the largest river, forms the border with the Gold and Peru, flows into the Pacific Ocean with the name of Tumbes River; Alamor river rises in the foothills of Guachanama in its route goes through the cantonal Pindal and Zapotillo and lays its waters in the Pacific Ocean, as well as have significant streams of Ingenio, Cochurco, Shoa, (Tunima).

== Production ==
Main products: coffee, corn, trifles, banana, brown sugar or cane to make rum, On the livestock, cattle, pigs, horses and poultry. Citrus, oranges, lemons and tropical fruit.

== Communication channels ==
Highway. - Main. - Loja-Alamor and Alamor-Arenillas Secondary: Alamor Vicentino, Ciano, Arenal. Alamor, silt, Mangaurco. Alamor, The collapsed Puyango (Old Bridge) Alamor Chaquinal, Pindal.

== Festivals civic and religious ==
January 23, Puyango cantonization anniversary. July 16, commercial and religious celebration in honor of the Virgin of El Carmen. August 15, commercial and religious celebration in honor of the Virgin of the Assumption. September 14 commercial and religious celebration in honor of our Señor del Girón, in Mercadillo. December 8, commercial and religious celebration in honor of the Immaculate Conception.
