= Gonzanamá =

- Town
- Location within Ecuador
- Coordinates: 4°13′53″S 79°26′7″W
- Country: Ecuador
- Province: Loja Province
- Canton: Gonzanamá Canton

Government
  - Mayor: Ing. Norman Omar Espinoza

Area
  - Town: 1.27 km^{2} (0.49 sq mi)

Population (2022 census)
  - Town: 1,973
  - Density: 1,550/km^{2} (4,020/sq mi)
- Time zone: ECT
- Climate: Cwb

Gonzanamá is a small town and also part of one of the 16 cantons (Gonzanamá) in Loja Province, Ecuador.

== History ==
The name of the city was created by two different native languages of Ecuador: Spanish and Quechua. The name of the cacique from the tribe of the anamaés is Gonza and the name of the coveted territory, which means favorite to the god of the water, is Anama or Munamá. Another meaning of the name is break of hills, because the city is located on the Andes Mountains.

After the Spanish conquest came some Dominicans, who have founded "The doctrine of Santo Domingo de Gonzanamá".

This was formed from different big confederations:

- Colambos
- Colcas
- Purunumas
- Sacapalcas
- Changaiminas
- Lanzacas
- Quilangas
- Nambocolas
- Anganumas
- Luginumas
- Chalangas

During colonization, the citizens of Gonzanamá did not want to submit to the Spanish. The town decided to write a Declaration of Independence on 17 February 1822. At the beginning, Gonzanamá was just a rural parish from the canton of Loja. On 27 September 1943 the Government of Dr. Carlos Arroyo del Rio created legislative Decree number 928 for it to become a big canton. This was officially published on 30 September 1943.

== Location ==
- Altitude: 1980 meters
- Area of the town: 712 km^{2}
- It is located in the middle of Loja Province. The borders are:
- To the north: Catamayo
- To the south: Quilanga
- To the east: Catamayo and Loja
- To the west: Paltas and Calvas

Distance from Gonzanamá to Loja (capital city of Loja Province): 81 km

== Government ==
The leader of the town is called mayor, and selected every 5 years. The current mayor is Ing. Norman Omar Espinoza.

It is divided into:

- One urban parish: Gonzanamá
- Four rural parishes: Nambacola, Purunuma, Salcapalca and Changaimina
- Eighty neighborhoods

The basic services are:

- Drinking water
- Sewerage
- Electricity
- Telephony

== Population ==
The population of Gonzanamá represents 3.7% of the total of Loja Province, and grows every year about 1.3%. 89.7% of the population is rural and 45.8% of them are under 20.

The 14,987 inhabitants are divided as:

- Urban area: 1,539
- Rural area: 13,448

Most of the people dedicated their lives to agriculture, producing tomatoes, sugar cane and other products. Cattle is another agricultural product, especially in the area of Colca. Timber production is very high and one of the most popular trees is the pine. Hand craftsmanship is also practiced. The native language is Spanish.

== Climate ==
Gonzanamá has a subtropical highland climate (Köppen: Cwb). Light showers and small storms are very common.

Gonzanamá was devastated by an earthquake in the last century, which also toppled the principal church of the town.

Temperature: 18 °C (11 °C – 22 °C)

== Culture ==
=== Typical food ===
- Pea soup and green bananas with coffee or colada
- Beef stew with coffee or colada
- Sponge cake with milk or coffee
- Marzipan with milk or coffee

There are also many parties, which are celebrated every year.

=== Events ===
The date of the party will be planned every year. Special guests will be invited and parades-competitions of horses. At the party dimantina (a mix of fresh milk and alcohol) will be offered for all the people. The exhibition of beautiful crafts is also a part of this party.

- 11 September: The anniversary of Changaimina as a parish.
- 13 September: The anniversary of Purunuma as a parish.
- 24 June: The anniversary of Nambacola as a parish.
- 8 December: The anniversary of Sacapalca as a parish.

At many of these parties the Queen of the parish will be selected. Another tradition is choosing a symbol mother.

== Education ==
The lessons started in the mountain range and the Amazon at the same time (1 September). The school year is divided into two parts, each lasting 5 months.

The highest school score is 10/10 points.

A list of school supplies is required for all students, it is composed by:

- School supplies: notebooks, folders, pens and others.
- Personal cleaning supplies: a small tower, soap, toilet paper and damp paper.

There are four elementary schools, four high schools, one weekend school and also a few state universities.

Some of them are:

- Unidad Educativa Fiscomisional "Padre Jorge Aviatar Quevedo Figueroa": Catholic-Nursery, elementary and high school.
- Colegio técnico Gonzanamá: High school.
- Escuela fiscal 12 de Octubre: High school only for girls.
- Escuela Laultaro Loayza: Elementary school only for boys.
- Universidad Cotopaxi: College

Most of the schools are located in the middle of the town.

== Religion ==
Like many Latin-Americans, the Ecuadorians are catholic. The citizens of Gonzanamá are Catholic, too.

There are also Catholic parties, which are celebrated every year. For Example:

- 19 March: "Fiesta del Senor del Buen Suceso", the biggest Catholic celebration of the town. It starts on 18 August with the "arrival" of god and it will be kept from many Ecuadorians and also on the north of Peru. In Gonzanamá it is characterized by burning castles in the night, native music and the traditional crazy cow.
- First Sunday of July: "Fiesta del Sagrado Corazón de Jesus" will celebrated by almost all Catholics.
- 16 July: "Fiesta de la Virgen del Carmen or the Virgin of Colca"
- 20 August: "Fiestas de San José"

== Tourism ==
=== Natural attractions ===
Gonzanama's geography zone shows a lot of spring landscapes, which attract the attention of many tourists.

The viewpoint of the Columbo's hill: With altitude of 3097 meters, it exposes the treasure of herds and invites the tourists to an eco-tourism experience.

The river pool of Lansaca: The ravine of Lansaca is located three kilometers away from Gonzanamá, on the way to Cariamanga. The tourists loved this.

La Banda: It is a spring of medicinal waters, because of the long amount of sulfur. The benefits of the water attract the attention of many tourists.

=== Cultural attractions ===
The urban center or the city center: The central park with his pool and crowned with the Matrix church.

The livestock center: It is located near to the town and reserved for the exhibition and the sale of cattle.

Petroglyph: In the parish of Sacapalca is a pyramid-shaped petroglyph on a stone. On both sides is the sun drawn. The sun was the god of the palta's tribu.

=== Tales ===
The legend of the Columbo's hill: With a maya, toleca, inca or palca origin. People say that on the top of the hill has existed a lake, surrounded by gardens of colorful flowers. In the middle of the lake floats a gold pan and over this a bull's head. Every year during the party's the flowers have been brushed by the horns of the bull. The right horn has sprouted gold grains and the left horn silver grains, which are later distributed between the anamáes.
