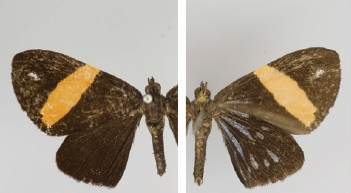
- Male (dorsal view left and ventral view)

Scientific classification
- Domain: Eukaryota
- Kingdom: Animalia
- Phylum: Arthropoda
- Class: Insecta
- Order: Lepidoptera
- Family: Geometridae
- Genus: Hagnagora
- Species: H. lex

Binomial name
- Hagnagora lex H. Druce, 1885

= Hagnagora lex =

Species of moth

Hagnagora lex is a species of moth of the family Geometridae first described by Herbert Druce in 1885. It is found in the eastern Ecuadorian Andes.

Adults are smaller than Hagnagora buckleyi and of similar size to Hagnagora catagrammina. The extension of the blue blotches is significantly smaller than in H. buckleyi. The form of the transversal band on the forewing is similar to that in H. buckleyi, but the band does not stretch as far towards the wing margins.
