= Zapotillo =

Zapotillo may refer to:

- Zapotillo, Ecuador, town in Ecuador, capital of the Zapotillo Canton
  - Zapotillo Canton, canton in Loja Province, Ecuador
- Zapotillo, Panama, corregimiento in Las Palmas District, Veraguas Province, Panama
- Zapotillo River, river in Mexico
