= Chaguarpamba Canton =

- Canton
- The location of Loja Province in Ecuador

- Chaguarpamba Canton in Loja Province
- Coordinates: 03°51′0″S 79°39′0″W
- Country: Ecuador
- Province: Loja Province

Area
  - Total: 313.4 km^{2} (121.0 sq mi)

Population (2022 census)
  - Total: 6,857
  - Density: 21.88/km^{2} (56.67/sq mi)

Chaguarpamba is a canton in the Province of Loja Ecuador. Its seat is Chaguarpamba. The canton is located in the north of the province and is bordered by the cantons of Catamayo, Olmedo, Paltas, and the province of El Oro. The name is Quichua for "Valley of Jaguars." It occupies an area of 313.4 km^{2} at an altitude of 1050 m, with a population of 6,857. Average temperature is between 18 and 24 °C

Chaguarpamba is noted for its coffee.

== Demographics ==
Ethnic groups as of the Ecuadorian census of 2010:

- Mestizo 95.7%
- White 2.3%
- Montubio 1.3%
- Afro-Ecuadorian 0.6%
- Indigenous 0.1%
- Other 0.0%
