= Espíndola Canton =

Canton of Loja province, Ecuador

Coordinates: 4°34′59″S 79°25′37″W

Loja Province

Espíndola is a canton in the Province of Loja Ecuador. It is located in the south-east, bordered by the cantons of Quilanga and Calvas, the province of Zamora-Chinchipe and the country of Peru. It covers an area of 632 km^{2} at an altitude of 1720 m, with a population of 19,213. The average temperature is 19.9 °C.

== Demographics ==
Ethnic groups as of the Ecuadorian census of 2010:

- Mestizo 97.0%
- White 1.4%
- Afro-Ecuadorian 1.1%
- Montubio 0.4%
- Indigenous 0.1%
- Other 0.0%

== Attractions ==
- The Black Lakes of Jumbura - a series of lakes at 3390m, occupying about 15 hectares.
