= Celica =

Celica may refer to:

- Celica, Ecuador, capital of the below canton
- Celica Canton, canton in Loja Province, Ecuador
- Toyota Celica, sports car
  - Toyota Celica GT-Four, a high performance model of the Celica Liftback
  - Toyota Celica Camry, a four-door sports sedan based on the Toyota Carina
  - Toyota Celica LB Turbo, a Group 5 Special Production racecar
  - Toyota Celica Supra, a sports car and grand tourer
- Celica, one of the two protagonists of Fire Emblem Gaiden and its remake, Fire Emblem Echoes: Shadows of Valentia
- Celica A. Mercury, a fictional character from the BlazBlue series
