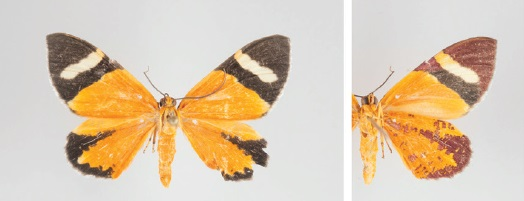
- Male (dorsal view left and ventral view)
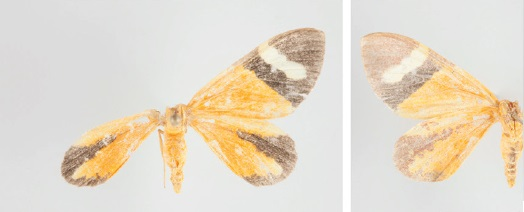
- Female (dorsal view left and ventral view)

Scientific classification
- Domain: Eukaryota
- Kingdom: Animalia
- Phylum: Arthropoda
- Class: Insecta
- Order: Lepidoptera
- Family: Geometridae
- Genus: Hagnagora
- Species: H. mirandahenrichae

Binomial name
- Hagnagora mirandahenrichae Brehm, 2015

= Hagnagora mirandahenrichae =

Species of moth

Hagnagora mirandahenrichae is a species of moth of the family Geometridae first described by Gunnar Brehm in 2015. It is only known from the sectors Santa Maria and Pitilla from Área de Conservación Guanacaste, Guanacaste Province, in north-western Costa Rica.

Adults are easily distinguished from Hagnagora croceitincta by its wing patterns. The yellow ground colour of H. mirandahenrichae is slightly more intense than in Hagnagora clustimena.

== Etymology ==
The species is named in honour of Ms. Miranda Henrich of California in recognition of her and her mother's critical support for understanding the taxonomy and biodiversity development of the Área de Conservación Guanacaste in northwestern Costa Rica.
