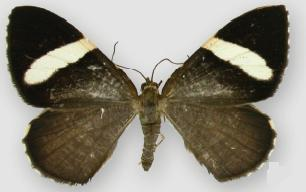
- Male
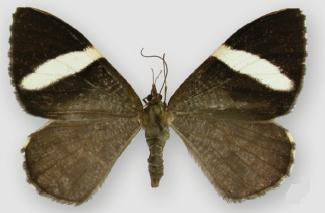
- Female

Scientific classification
- Domain: Eukaryota
- Kingdom: Animalia
- Phylum: Arthropoda
- Class: Insecta
- Order: Lepidoptera
- Family: Geometridae
- Genus: Hagnagora
- Species: H. elianne

Binomial name
- Hagnagora elianne Sullivan, 2011

= Hagnagora elianne =

Species of moth

Hagnagora elianne is a species of moth of the family Geometridae first described by J. Bolling Sullivan in 2011. It is found in Costa Rica and Honduras.

Adults are very similar to Hagnagora anicata and Hagnagora unnia. Males are slightly larger than those of H. unnia (by 2 mm on average but with overlapping ranges) but otherwise indistinguishable. They may be distinguished from H. anicata by the swollen distal half of the uncus (as opposed to gently tapered) and the absence of a moderately large, upcurved spine at the end of the costa. Females may be distinguished from females of H. unnia by their longer, more complex signa. The female of H. anicata is undescribed.

== Etymology ==
The species is named for Eli-Anne Lindstrom, a scientist whose biological studies of freshwater algae have contributed significantly to water quality monitoring in Norway.
