= José María Velasco Ibarra Airport =

- IATA: MRR; ICAO: SEMA

Summary
- Airport type: Public
- Operator: Government
- Serves: Macará, Ecuador
- Elevation AMSL: 1,508 ft (460 m)
- Coordinates: 04°22′45″S 79°56′29″W

Map
- Location of the airport in Ecuador

Runways
| Direction | Length | | Surface |
| Direction | m | ft | Surface |
|---|---|---|---|
| 01/19 | 1,080 | 3,543 | Asphalt |
- Source: WAD GCM Google Maps

José María Velasco Ibarra Airport (Spanish: Aeropuerto J.M. Velasco Ibarra) (IATA: MRR, ICAO: SEMA) is an airport serving Macará, a city in the Loja Province of Ecuador. Macará is on Ecuador's border with Peru.

The airport is named for José María Velasco Ibarra, a former president of Ecuador.

The airport is within the city, and has mountainous terrain north, and rising terrain in all other quadrants. The Macara non-directional beacon (Ident: MAC) is located on the field.

== See also ==
- Transport in Ecuador
- List of airports in Ecuador
