= Protepicorsia costalis =

Scientific classification
- Domain: Eukaryota
- Kingdom: Animalia
- Phylum: Arthropoda
- Class: Insecta
- Order: Lepidoptera
- Family: Crambidae
- Genus: Protepicorsia
- Species: P. costalis

Binomial name
- Protepicorsia costalis (Dognin, 1903)

Synonyms
- Ebulea costalis Dognin, 1903

Species of moth

Protepicorsia costalis is a moth in the family Crambidae. It was described by Paul Dognin in 1903. It is found in Loja Province, Ecuador.
