= Andes Children's Foundation =

American charity for education of children in Ecuador

Andes Children's Foundation is a registered 501 (c)(3) non-profit supporting the education of children in the rainforest of Vilcabamba, Ecuador. The non-profit was founded in 2003 by Craig Keeland.

== History ==
In 1991, Craig Keeland took a trip to Ecuador to study the legendary centenarians of the Vilcabamba Valley and attempt to understand why they live so long. During his visit, he found the state of the educational system to be "extremely basic." Some of the schools had no roof, desks, or running water. Textbooks were rare, and technology was basically non-existent.

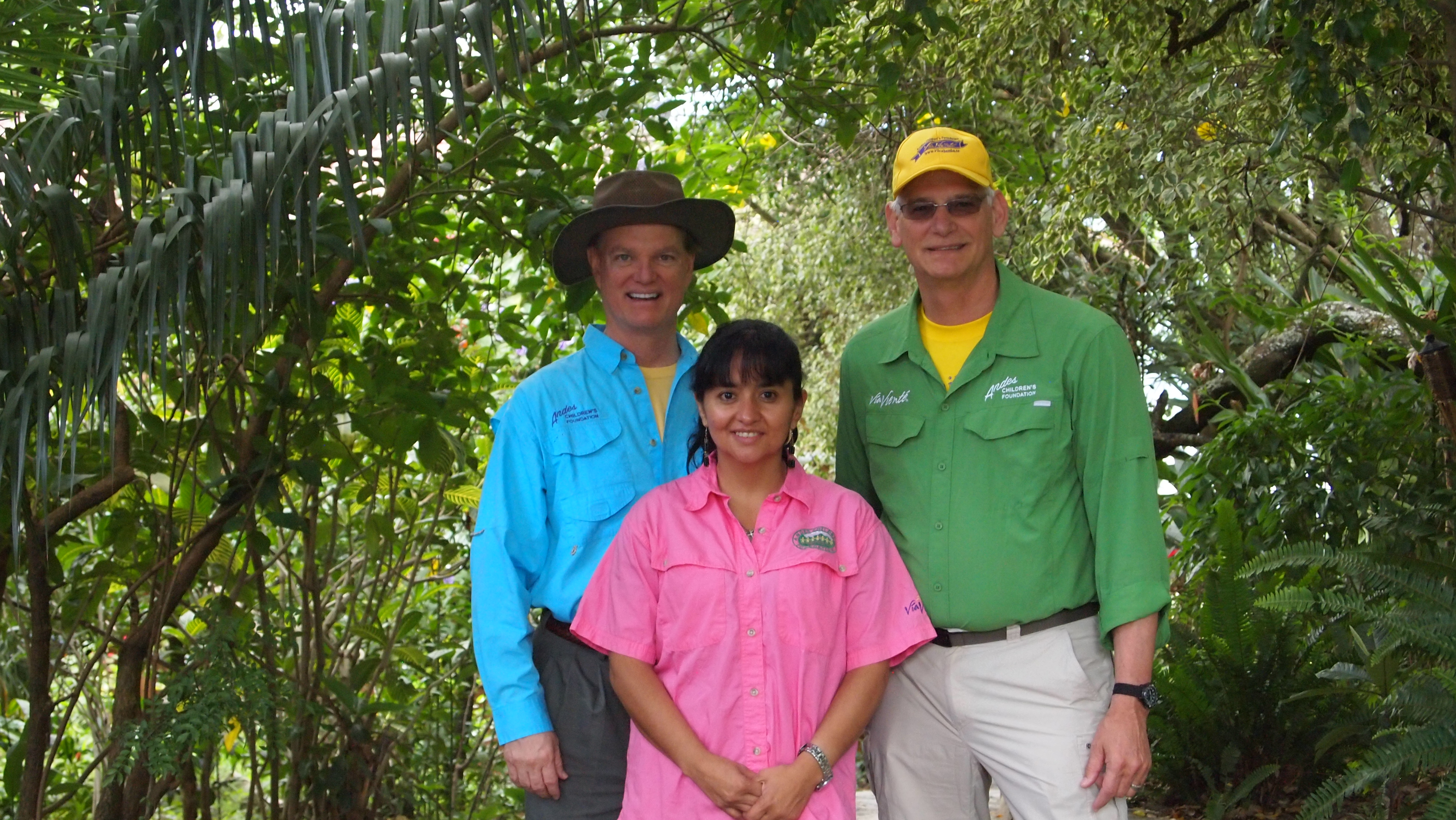
Craig Keeland, Terry Minke, and Cristina Alvarez on Mission Trip 6 in 2013

In 2003 (22 years ago), Craig Keeland founded the Andes Children's Foundation. Dr. Mark Pedersen and Terry Minke joined him as co-founders. Jaime Mendoza, a resident of Vilcabamba, was also in the founders and trustees until his death in 2011.

In October 2003, Keeland delivered the first computers to the schools. The formal ACF Mission Trips began in 2004, with subsequent trips in 2006, 2008, 2009, 2011, and 2013. Terry Minke and his wife led the first mission trip in 2004. Through these mission trips, ACF has provided computers, printers, school supplies, educational DVDs, microscopes and other science lab equipment, copy machines, and computer repair support. Mission trip volunteers have offered teacher training on computers and arts and crafts. Additionally, part of the Andes Children's Foundation is Mission: Vilcabamba, a group that takes volunteers to Vilcabamba to teach their areas of expertise to the students.

In 2006, ACF contracted with Ivan Macanchi in Quito, Ecuador to install towers and antennas in the Valley for Internet. Ivan's company is now VilcaNet and has expanded to 2,000 residents in the area.

In 2007, the ACF completed the building of Mollepamba School. As of 2013, the foundation supports 13 schools in the Vilcabamba Valley.

== General Structure and Funding ==
The ACF works with Vilcabamba school district administrators to assess school needs. A Vilcabamba resident is the liaison between the ACF board and the administrators. While in this position, Jaime Mendoza met with school administrators each month. Cristina Alvarez was appointed to this position in 2012.

Foundation funding comes from individual contributors and a percentage of sales from the whole food puree marketed by CK Companies. All overhead is paid for by CK Companies, and 100% of funds raised go to educational support in Vilcabamba.
