= Black Lakes of Jumbura =

The Black Lakes of Jumbura (Spanish: Lagunas Negras de Jimbura) are located in the canton of Espíndola in the province of Loja, Ecuador.

They are a 15-hectare complex of volcanic crater lakes at the altitude of 3390 m, with water temperature ranging from 6 to 8°C. The largest lake has a waterfall which forms a smaller sub-lake. The name "Black Lakes" comes from the colour of the volcanic stone that forms the lakebeds. The lakes are only accessible in October, November, and the first week of December, due to weather conditions. There is a wide range of orchids along the paths, and trout fishing is popular.
