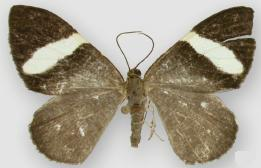
- Male
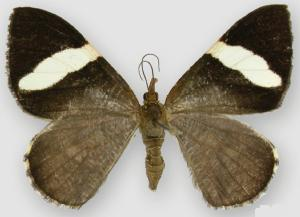
- Female

Scientific classification
- Kingdom: Animalia
- Phylum: Arthropoda
- Clade: Pancrustacea
- Class: Insecta
- Order: Lepidoptera
- Family: Geometridae
- Genus: Hagnagora
- Species: H. unnia

Binomial name
- Hagnagora unnia Sullivan, 2011

= Hagnagora unnia =

Species of moth

Hagnagora unnia is a species of moth of the family Geometridae first described by J. Bolling Sullivan in 2011. It is found in Costa Rica.

Males are usually smaller but otherwise are indistinguishable from those of Hagnagora elianne. They may be distinguished from Hagnagora anicata by the swollen distal half of the uncus (as opposed to gently tapered) and the absence of a moderately large, upcurved spine at the end of the costa. Females may be distinguished from those of H. elianne by their shorter, less complex signum. The female of H. anicata is undescribed. Specimens from higher altitudes are larger as are most H. elianne. Specimens from lower altitudes are smaller as are most H. unnia. Although size alone cannot always be used to distinguish the species, it is often an excellent indicator, particularly where both species occur together.

== Etymology ==
The species is named for Unni E. H. Fyhn, a postdoctoral student in the laboratory of the author in the 1970s who continued to work on the genetic control of fish hemoglobins until her untimely death from cancer.
