= Airo =

Airo may refer to:

- Airó, a Portuguese parish
- El Airo, Loja, Ecuador, a village
- Airo Aviation, an aircraft manufacturer headquartered in the United Arab Emirates
- Italian Operations Research Society (Associazione Italiana di Ricerca Operativa)
- AIRO, post-nominal letters for an Associate Member of the Institution of Railway Operators (changed to ACIRO in October 2021)
- Aksel Airo (1898-1985), Finnish lieutenant general
- Amtrak Airo, the brand for Siemens Venture trainsets to be operated in the United States of America
- Airo (more commonly Aiho), 16th century ruler of the Ondo Kingdom in what is now Nigeria
- Airo, a character in the Japanese/Korean anime series Zoobles!
