= Puyango Canton =

Puyango
- Location of Loja Province in Ecuador.

- Puyango Canton in Loja Province
- Coordinates: 3°52′12″S 80°5′24″W
- Country: Ecuador
- Province: Loja

Area
  - Total: 637.3 km^{2} (246.1 sq mi)

Population (2022 census)
  - Total: 16,257
  - Density: 25.51/km^{2} (66.07/sq mi)

Puyango is a canton of the Province of Loja, Ecuador. It is located in the west of the province, and borders the cantons of Paltas, Celica, Pindal, and Zapotillo.

== Sources ==
- World-Gazetteer.com
