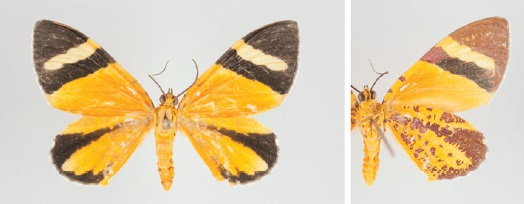
- Male (dorsal view left and ventral)
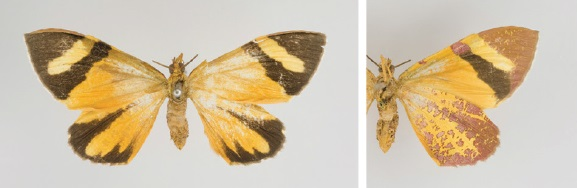
- Female (dorsal view left and ventral)

Scientific classification
- Domain: Eukaryota
- Kingdom: Animalia
- Phylum: Arthropoda
- Class: Insecta
- Order: Lepidoptera
- Family: Geometridae
- Genus: Hagnagora
- Species: H. clustimena

Binomial name
- Hagnagora clustimena (H. Druce, 1893)

Synonyms
- Heterusia clustimena H. Druce, 1893

= Hagnagora clustimena =

Species of moth

Hagnagora clustimena is a species of moth of the family Geometridae first described by Herbert Druce in 1893. It is found in Mexico, Panama, Honduras and Costa Rica.

Adults are on average smaller than Hagnagora croceitincta and slightly larger than Hagnagora mirandahenrichae. The white transversal blotch on the forewing stretches to the costal margin and the apical dark-brown area reaches vein CuA2, as also observed in H. mirandahenrichae. H. clustimena is slightly paler than H. mirandahenrichae.
