= Puyango =

Puyango may refer to:

- Puyango River, the name in Ecuador for the Tumbes River, flowing from Ecuador through Peru to the Pacific Ocean
- Puyango Canton, Ecuador
- Puyango Petrified Forest, Ecuador
