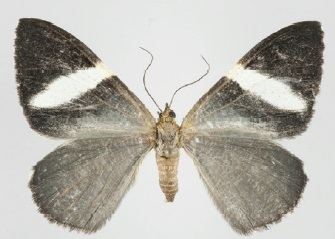
- Female

Scientific classification
- Domain: Eukaryota
- Kingdom: Animalia
- Phylum: Arthropoda
- Class: Insecta
- Order: Lepidoptera
- Family: Geometridae
- Genus: Hagnagora
- Species: H. hedwigae

Binomial name
- Hagnagora hedwigae Brehm, 2015

= Hagnagora hedwigae =

Species of moth

Hagnagora hedwigae is a species of moth of the family Geometridae first described by Gunnar Brehm in 2015. It is only found in southern Ecuador.

The length of the forewings is 21 mm. Adults closely resemble Hagnagora anicata and Hagnagora richardi, but is larger than H. anicata, and the signum of the bursa copulatrix is more complex than in H. richardi.

== Etymology ==
The species is named in honour of Hedwig Seppelt in recognition of support for the taxonomy of Neotropical geometrid moths provided by her daughter-in-law Irmgard Seppelt and her son Winfried Seppelt.
