= Palpusia subcandidalis =

Scientific classification
- Kingdom: Animalia
- Phylum: Arthropoda
- Class: Insecta
- Order: Lepidoptera
- Family: Crambidae
- Genus: Palpusia
- Species: P. subcandidalis

Binomial name
- Palpusia subcandidalis (Dognin, 1905)

Synonyms
- Pilocrocis subcandidalis Dognin, 1905

Species of moth

Palpusia subcandidalis is a moth in the family Crambidae. It was described by Paul Dognin in 1905. It is found in Loja Province, Ecuador.
