= Pyrausta internexalis =

Scientific classification
- Domain: Eukaryota
- Kingdom: Animalia
- Phylum: Arthropoda
- Class: Insecta
- Order: Lepidoptera
- Family: Crambidae
- Genus: Pyrausta
- Species: P. internexalis

Binomial name
- Pyrausta internexalis (Dognin, 1905)

Synonyms
- Pionea internexalis Dognin, 1905

Species of moth

Pyrausta internexalis is a moth in the family Crambidae. It was described by Paul Dognin in 1905. It is found in Loja Province, Ecuador.
