= Palpusia goniopalpia =

Scientific classification
- Kingdom: Animalia
- Phylum: Arthropoda
- Class: Insecta
- Order: Lepidoptera
- Family: Crambidae
- Genus: Palpusia
- Species: P. goniopalpia

Binomial name
- Palpusia goniopalpia (Hampson, 1912)

Synonyms
- Pilocrocis goniopalpia Hampson, 1912

Species of moth

Palpusia goniopalpia is a moth of the family Crambidae. It was described by George Hampson in 1912 and is found in Colombia, but has also been recorded from North America.

The wingspan is about 25 mm.
