= Chaguarpamba =

- Location within Ecuador
- Coordinates: 03°51′0″S 79°39′0″W
- Country: Ecuador
- Province: Loja Province
- Canton: Chaguarpamba Canton

Government
  - Mayor: Darwin Diaz

Area
  - Total: 0.61 km^{2} (0.24 sq mi)

Population (2022 census)
  - Total: 1,342
  - Density: 2,200/km^{2} (5,700/sq mi)
- Time zone: ECT
- Climate: Aw

Chaguarpamba is a location in the Loja Province, Ecuador. It is the seat of the Chaguarpamba Canton.
