= Calvas Canton =

Coordinates: 4°19′12″S 79°33′36″W

- Canton
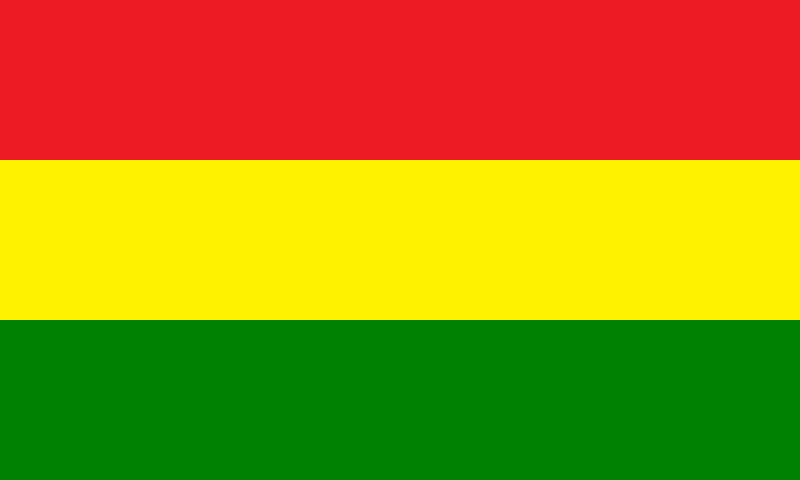
- Flag

- Location of Loja Province in Ecuador

- Calvas Canton in Loja Province
- Country: Ecuador
- Province: Loja Province

Area
  - Total: 851.2 km^{2} (328.7 sq mi)

Population (2022 census)
  - Total: 26,042
  - Density: 30.59/km^{2} (79.24/sq mi)

Calvas is a canton of the Province of Loja, Ecuador, located in the south of the province, bordering Paltas and Gonzanamá in the north, Quilanga and Espíndola in the east, Peru in the south, and Sozoranga in the west. It covers 851.2 km^{2} at an altitude of about 1,932 m. The total population is 26,042, and the capital city of the canton is Cariamanga.

== Demographics ==
Ethnic groups as of the Ecuadorian census of 2010:

- Mestizo 95.9%
- White 2.2%
- Afro-Ecuadorian 1.2%
- Indigenous 0.4%
- Montubio 0.3%
- Other 0.1%

== Attractions ==
- Ahuaca Hill - 2463m tall, it is made up of two peaks. A cross is placed at 2454m as a symbol of local faith.
