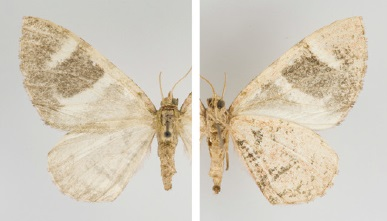
- Female (dorsal view left and ventral view)

Scientific classification
- Domain: Eukaryota
- Kingdom: Animalia
- Phylum: Arthropoda
- Class: Insecta
- Order: Lepidoptera
- Family: Geometridae
- Genus: Hagnagora
- Species: H. subrosea

Binomial name
- Hagnagora subrosea (Warren, 1909)

Synonyms
- Cophocerotis subrosea Warren, 1909

= Hagnagora subrosea =

Species of moth

Hagnagora subrosea is a species of moth of the family Geometridae first described by William Warren in 1909. It is found in Peru.

Adults have a unique combination of a pale brown wing colour with two white transversal bands on the forewings not found in any other species of Hagnagora.
