= Protepicorsia =

Scientific classification
- Domain: Eukaryota
- Kingdom: Animalia
- Phylum: Arthropoda
- Class: Insecta
- Order: Lepidoptera
- Family: Crambidae
- Subfamily: Pyraustinae
- Genus: Protepicorsia; Munroe, 1964

Genus of moths

Protepicorsia is a genus of moths of the family Crambidae.

== Species ==
- Protepicorsia agraptalis (Dognin, 1903)
- Protepicorsia albipennis (Dognin, 1903)
- Protepicorsia bicolor Munroe, 1964
- Protepicorsia costalis (Dognin, 1903)
- Protepicorsia ectoxanthia (Hampson, 1899)
- Protepicorsia flavidalis (Hampson, 1913)
- Protepicorsia latimarginalis Munroe, 1964
- Protepicorsia maculifera Munroe, 1964
- Protepicorsia magnifovealis (Hampson, 1918)
- Protepicorsia pozuzoa Munroe, 1964
- Protepicorsia quincemila Munroe, 1978
- Protepicorsia sordida Munroe, 1978
- Protepicorsia thyriphora (Hampson, 1899)
