= Palpusia glaucusalis =

Scientific classification
- Kingdom: Animalia
- Phylum: Arthropoda
- Class: Insecta
- Order: Lepidoptera
- Family: Crambidae
- Genus: Palpusia
- Species: P. glaucusalis

Binomial name
- Palpusia glaucusalis (Walker, 1859)

Synonyms
- Botys glaucusalis Walker, 1859

Species of moth

Palpusia glaucusalis is a moth in the family Crambidae. It was described by Francis Walker in 1859. It is found in Jamaica.
