= Cariamanga =

Town in Loja Province, Ecuador

Cariamanga Cariamanga
- Town
- San Pedro Mártir de Cariamanga
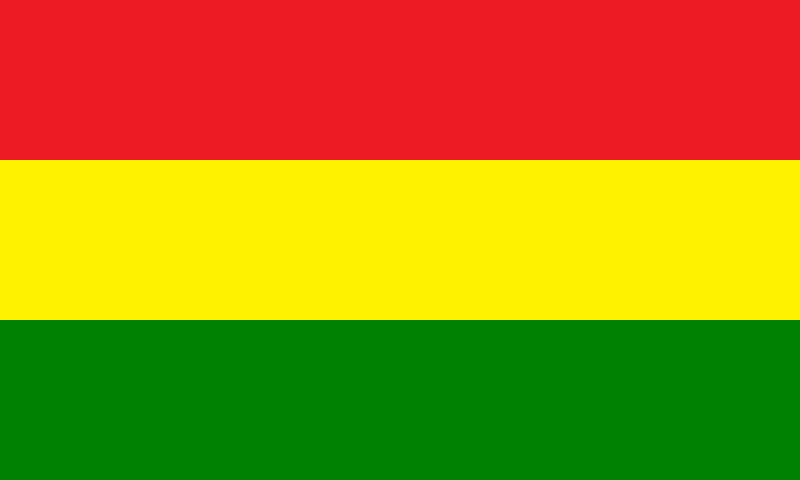
- Flag

- Location within Ecuador
- Coordinates: 4°19′12″S 79°33′36″W
- Country: Ecuador
- Province: Loja
- Canton: Calvas
- Founded: 29 April 1546
- Founded by: Gonzalo Pizarro

Government
  - Mayor: Jorge Montero Rodríguez

Area
  - Total: 3.32 km^{2} (1.28 sq mi)
- Elevation: 1,950 m (6,400 ft)

Population (2022 census)
  - Total: 13,175
  - Density: 3,970/km^{2} (10,300/sq mi)
- Time zone: UTC−5 (ECT)
- Postal code: 110606, 110607
- Area code: (+593) 7
- Climate: Cwb

Cariamanga, officially San Pedro Mártir de Cariamanga is a town in southern Ecuador and the seat of Calvas Canton in Loja Province. The urban parish occupies a compact plateau beneath the twin-peaked Cerro Ahuaca and serves as a commercial hub between Loja and the Peru border at Macará.

== Etymology ==
Local historiography records the colonial style San Pedro Mártir de Cariamanga. Municipal tradition also attributes the toponym Cariamanga to Quichua curi (gold) and manga (pot), a folk etymology not universally accepted by linguists.

== History ==
Spanish foundation is dated to 29 April 1546, during campaigns in southern Quito Province; documentary syntheses attribute the act to Gonzalo Pizarro.

== Geography ==
Cariamanga lies at about 1,950 metres (6,400 ft) on a tableland beneath Cerro Ahuaca, a twin-peaked inselberg rising to roughly 2,470 metres (8,100 ft) that dominates the northern skyline and is a local hiking venue.

=== Ecology and wildlife ===
The granite outcrop of Cerro Ahuaca is the only confirmed locality of the mountain viscacha Lagidium ahuacaense, first observed in 2005 near Cariamanga and formally described in 2009. The species is restricted to rocky habitats on the Cerro and was recommended for assessment as Critically Endangered due to its small range and population.

== Demographics ==
According to the 2022 national census compiled by INEC, the urban population of the Cariamanga parish is 13,175 out of a total parish population of 19,551.

== Economy ==
Cariamanga functions as a service and trade center for the surrounding highland valleys. Specialty coffee from farms on Cerro Ahuaca’s slopes contributes to the local agro-economy and export micro-lots.

== Culture and landmarks ==
- Cerro Ahuaca – emblematic twin-peaked formation with panoramic viewpoints.

== Transport ==
Cariamanga sits on the Loja–Macará corridor; intercity buses link to Loja and Macará and the E682 provides access toward La Balsa and the Andean piedmont.

== Climate ==
Climate data for Cariamanga, elevation 1,950 m (6,400 ft) (1971–2000)
Month	Jan	Feb	Mar	Apr	May	Jun	Jul	Aug	Sep	Oct	Nov	Dec	Year
Mean daily maximum °C (°F)	23.7 (74.7)	23.0 (73.4)	23.0 (73.4)	23.2 (73.8)	24.1 (75.4)	24.3 (75.7)	24.6 (76.3)	25.2 (77.4)	25.6 (78.1)	25.0 (77.0)	24.1 (75.4)	24.8 (76.6)	24.2 (75.6)
Mean daily minimum °C (°F)	12.4 (54.3)	12.6 (54.7)	12.1 (53.8)	12.5 (54.5)	11.3 (52.3)	10.8 (51.4)	10.4 (50.7)	11.1 (52.0)	11.2 (52.2)	11.5 (52.7)	11.0 (51.8)	11.6 (52.9)	11.5 (52.8)
Average precipitation mm (inches)	110.0 (4.33)	202.0 (7.95)	294.0 (11.57)	204.0 (8.03)	77.0 (3.03)	27.0 (1.06)	7.0 (0.28)	14.0 (0.55)	26.0 (1.02)	57.0 (2.24)	50.0 (1.97)	65.0 (2.56)	1,133 (44.59)
Average relative humidity (%)	83	85	86	90	81	76	70	70	69	77	76	81	79
Source: FAO

== Notable people ==
- Jerónimo Carrión (1804–1873), lawyer and statesman, President of Ecuador (1865–1867); born in Cariamanga.
- José María Riofrío y Valdivieso (1794–1877), Roman Catholic prelate; Archbishop of Quito (1861–1867).
- Moisés Oliva Jiménez (1874–1926), army general; first president of the Círculo Militar (1916); born in San Pedro Mártir de Cariamanga.
- Max Berrú (1942–2018), Ecuadorian–Chilean musician; co-founder and lead singer of Inti-Illimani; born in Cariamanga.
- Jordy Jiménez (born 1994), Olympic racewalker; born in Cariamanga.

== See also ==
- Calvas Canton
- Loja Province
