= Catamayo Canton =

Coordinates: 3.98°S 79.35°W

- Canton
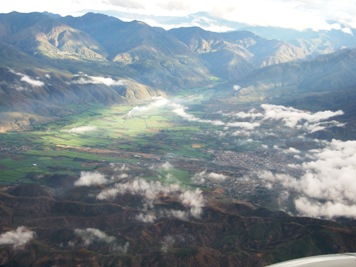
- Vista aérea del Valle de Catamayo.

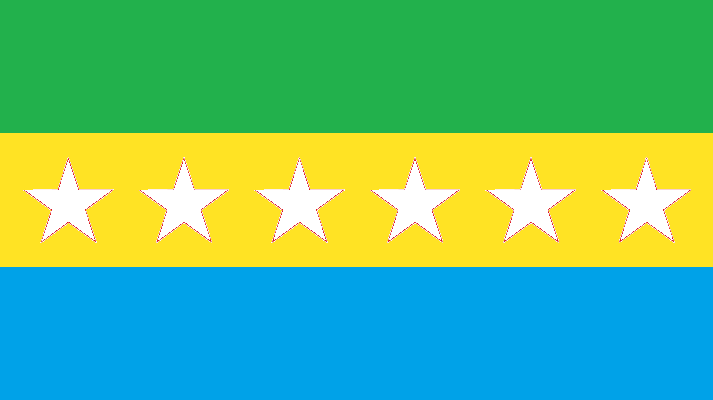
- Flag

- Location of Loja Province in Ecuador

- Catamayo Canton in Loja Province
- Country: Ecuador
- Province: Loja Province

Area
  - Total: 651.9 km^{2} (251.7 sq mi)

Population (2022 census)
  - Total: 35,240
  - Density: 54.06/km^{2} (140.0/sq mi)

Catamayo Canton is a canton of Loja Province in Ecuador. Its seat is Catamayo. It is located in the north of the province, bordered by the cantons of Loja, Gonzanamá, Olmedo, and Chaguarpamba. In it is located the largest and most fertile valley of the province, and is the location of the Monterrey Sugar Cane Processing Plant, a major sugarcane operation which is a financial boon to the province and country. The town of La Toma in Catamayo is the seat of the city of Loja's airport.

== Geography ==
The canton covers 651.9 km^{2} situated between altitudes of 500 – 1700 m, and has a population of 35,240.

Main exports are sugar and bananas

Attractions include:

- Boqueron River - with sandy beaches and warm water, the river is a popular tourist destination

== Demographics ==
Ethnic groups as of the Ecuadorian census of 2010:

- Mestizo 88.0%
- Afro-Ecuadorian 7.5%
- White 3.8%
- Indigenous 0.3%
- Montubio 0.3%
- Other 0.3%
