= Palpusia fulvicolor =

Scientific classification
- Kingdom: Animalia
- Phylum: Arthropoda
- Class: Insecta
- Order: Lepidoptera
- Family: Crambidae
- Genus: Palpusia
- Species: P. fulvicolor

Binomial name
- Palpusia fulvicolor (Hampson, 1917)

Synonyms
- Pilocrocis fulvicolor Hampson, 1917

Species of moth

Palpusia fulvicolor is a moth in the family Crambidae. It was described by George Hampson in 1917. It is found in Bolivia.
