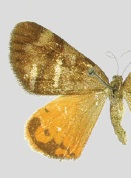
- Male

Scientific classification
- Domain: Eukaryota
- Kingdom: Animalia
- Phylum: Arthropoda
- Class: Insecta
- Order: Lepidoptera
- Family: Geometridae
- Genus: Hagnagora
- Species: H. ignipennis

Binomial name
- Hagnagora ignipennis (Dognin, 1913)

Synonyms
- Heterusia ignipennis Dognin, 1913

= Hagnagora ignipennis =

Species of moth

"Hagnagora" ignipennis is a species of moth of the family Geometridae first described by Paul Dognin in 1913. It is found in Colombia.

== Taxonomy ==
The species was provisionally removed from the genus Hagnagora. The wing pattern and particularly the wing shape diverge strongly from species in this genus.
