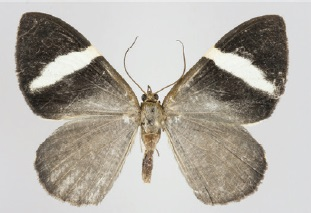
- Hagnagora richardi

Scientific classification
- Domain: Eukaryota
- Kingdom: Animalia
- Phylum: Arthropoda
- Class: Insecta
- Order: Lepidoptera
- Family: Geometridae
- Genus: Hagnagora; H. Druce, 1885

= Hagnagora =

Genus of moths

Hagnagora is a genus of moths in the family Geometridae erected by Herbert Druce in 1885.

== Species ==
- buckleyi clade
  - Hagnagora buckleyi Druce, 1885
  - Hagnagora catagrammina Druce, 1885
  - Hagnagora lex Druce, 1885
- anicata clade
  - Hagnagora anicata (Felder & Rogenhofer, 1875)
  - Hagnagora elianne Sullivan, 2011
  - Hagnagora unnia Sullivan, 2011
  - Hagnagora marionae Brehm and Sullivan, 2005
  - Hagnagora richardi Brehm, 2015
  - Hagnagora hedwigae Brehm, 2015
- croceitincta clade
  - Hagnagora croceitincta (Dognin, 1892)
  - Hagnagora clustimena (Druce, 1893)
  - Hagnagora mirandahenrichae Brehm, 2015
- mortipax clade
  - Hagnagora mortipax (Butler, 1872)
  - Hagnagora jamaicensis (Schaus, 1901)
  - Hagnagora acothysta (Schaus, 1901)
  - Hagnagora guatica (Schaus, 1927)
- ephestris clade
  - Hagnagora ephestris (Felder & Rogenhofer, 1875)
  - Hagnagora discordata (Guenée [1858])
  - Hagnagora luteoradiata (Thierry-Mieg, 1892)
- subrosea clade
  - Hagnagora subrosea (Warren, 1909)

== Species excluded from Hagnagora ==
- "Hagnagora" ignipennis (Dognin, 1913)
- "Hagnagora" mesenata (Felder & Rogenhofer, 1875)
- "Hagnagora" vittata (Philippi, 1859)
