= Protepicorsia albipennis =

Scientific classification
- Domain: Eukaryota
- Kingdom: Animalia
- Phylum: Arthropoda
- Class: Insecta
- Order: Lepidoptera
- Family: Crambidae
- Genus: Protepicorsia
- Species: P. albipennis

Binomial name
- Protepicorsia albipennis (Dognin, 1903)

Synonyms
- Pionea albipennis Dognin, 1903

Species of moth

Protepicorsia albipennis is a moth in the family Crambidae. It was described by Paul Dognin in 1903. It is found in Ecuador.
