= Palpusia ptyonota =

Scientific classification
- Kingdom: Animalia
- Phylum: Arthropoda
- Class: Insecta
- Order: Lepidoptera
- Family: Crambidae
- Genus: Palpusia
- Species: P. ptyonota

Binomial name
- Palpusia ptyonota (Hampson, 1912)

Synonyms
- Nacoleia ptyonota Hampson, 1912

Species of moth

Palpusia ptyonota is a moth in the family Crambidae. It was described by George Hampson in 1912. It is found in Peru.
