= Protepicorsia ectoxanthia =

Scientific classification
- Domain: Eukaryota
- Kingdom: Animalia
- Phylum: Arthropoda
- Class: Insecta
- Order: Lepidoptera
- Family: Crambidae
- Genus: Protepicorsia
- Species: P. ectoxanthia

Binomial name
- Protepicorsia ectoxanthia (Hampson, 1899)

Synonyms
- Pionea ectoxanthia Hampson, 1899

Species of moth

Protepicorsia ectoxanthia is a moth in the family Crambidae. It was described by George Hampson in 1899. It is found in Brazil.
