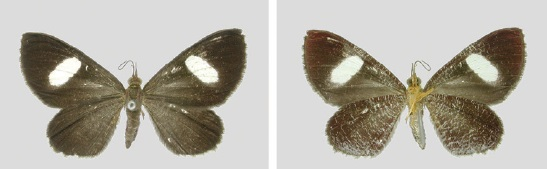
- Female (dorsal view left and ventral view)

Scientific classification
- Domain: Eukaryota
- Kingdom: Animalia
- Phylum: Arthropoda
- Class: Insecta
- Order: Lepidoptera
- Family: Geometridae
- Genus: Hagnagora
- Species: H. acothysta

Binomial name
- Hagnagora acothysta (Schaus, 1901)

Synonyms
- Heterusia acothysta Schaus, 1901

= Hagnagora acothysta =

Species of moth

Hagnagora acothysta is a species of moth of the family Geometridae first described by William Schaus in 1901. It is found in Brazil.

Unlike related species Hagnagora mortipax and Hagnagora jamaicensis, this species shows no white transversal band on the forewing, but rather a reduced blotch that reaches only about half of the size observed in H. mortipax.
