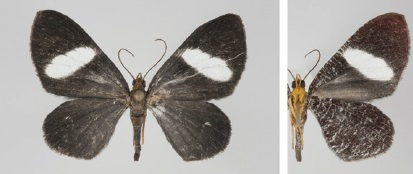
- Male (dorsal view left and ventral view)

Scientific classification
- Domain: Eukaryota
- Kingdom: Animalia
- Phylum: Arthropoda
- Class: Insecta
- Order: Lepidoptera
- Family: Geometridae
- Genus: Hagnagora
- Species: H. mortipax

Binomial name
- Hagnagora mortipax (Butler, 1872)

Synonyms
- Scordylia mortipax Butler, 1872; Heterusia flavipectus Warren, 1897

= Hagnagora mortipax =

Species of moth

Hagnagora mortipax is a species of moth of the family Geometridae first described by Arthur Gardiner Butler in 1872. It is found in Costa Rica and Ecuador.

The upperside of the wing has a dark brown base colour with a large cream-white blotch on the forewing. This blotch almost reaches the outer margin, also either reaching the costal margin (in Costa Rican specimens), or scantily not (in Ecuadorian specimens). The white blotch is narrower in Hagnagora jamaicensis, and significantly smaller, and separated from the outer margin, in Hagnagora acothysta from Brazil. All three species are significantly larger than Hagnagora guatica.

== Gallery ==
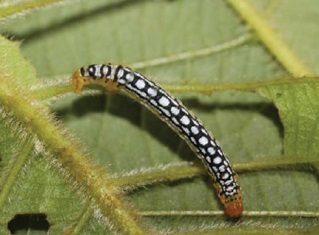
Larva dorsal view

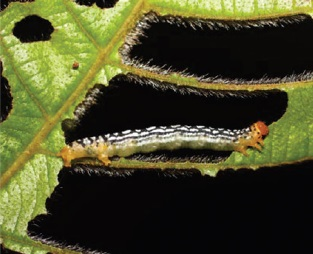
Larva lateral view
