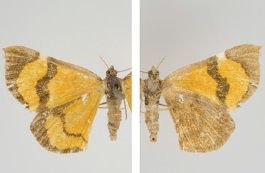
- Male (dorsal view left and ventral view)

Scientific classification
- Kingdom: Animalia
- Phylum: Arthropoda
- Class: Insecta
- Order: Lepidoptera
- Family: Geometridae
- Genus: Hagnagora
- Species: H. mesenata

Binomial name
- Hagnagora mesenata (Felder & Rogenhofer, 1875)

Synonyms
- Heterusia mesenata Felder & Rogenhofer, 1875

= Hagnagora mesenata =

Species of moth

"Hagnagora" mesenata is a species of moth of the family Geometridae first described by Felder and Rogenhofer in 1875. It is found in Chile.

== Taxonomy ==
The species was provisionally removed from the genus Hagnagora. The wing pattern and particularly the wing shape diverge strongly from species in this genus.
