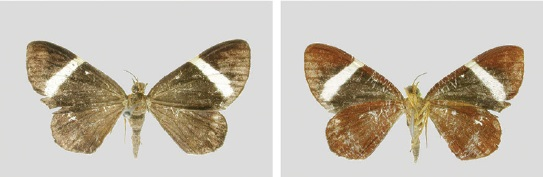
- Male (dorsal view left and ventral view)

Scientific classification
- Domain: Eukaryota
- Kingdom: Animalia
- Phylum: Arthropoda
- Class: Insecta
- Order: Lepidoptera
- Family: Geometridae
- Genus: Hagnagora
- Species: H. jamaicensis

Binomial name
- Hagnagora jamaicensis (Schaus, 1901)

Synonyms
- Heterusia jamaicensis Schaus, 1901

= Hagnagora jamaicensis =

Species of moth

Hagnagora jamaicensis is a species of moth of the family Geometridae first described by William Schaus in 1901. It is found on Jamaica.

In contrast to the other taxa in the Hagnagora mortipax clade, this species displays a very narrow, cream-white transversal band on the forewings. The striation on the underside of the hindwing is reduced in comparison to Hagnagora mortipax and Hagnagora acothysta.
