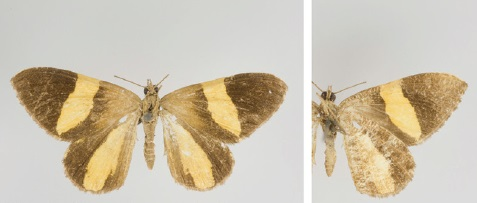
- Male (dorsal view left and ventral)

Scientific classification
- Kingdom: Animalia
- Phylum: Arthropoda
- Class: Insecta
- Order: Lepidoptera
- Family: Geometridae
- Genus: Hagnagora
- Species: H. discordata

Binomial name
- Hagnagora discordata (Guenée, [1858])

Synonyms
- Scordylia discordata Guenée, 1858

= Hagnagora discordata =

Species of moth

Hagnagora discordata is a species of moth of the family Geometridae first described by Achille Guenée in 1858. Although the type locality is Chile, the species is not thought to be found there. It has been recorded from Santa Catarina in Brazil.

Both H. discordata and H. ephestris show a pronounced yellow blotch on the hindwings that is absent in H. luteoradiata. The yellow transversal band on the forewing is narrower than in H. ephestris, and it does not reach the outer margin of the wing. Furthermore, the yellow blotch on the hindwing is much broader.
