= Protepicorsia flavidalis =

Scientific classification
- Kingdom: Animalia
- Phylum: Arthropoda
- Class: Insecta
- Order: Lepidoptera
- Family: Crambidae
- Genus: Protepicorsia
- Species: P. flavidalis

Binomial name
- Protepicorsia flavidalis (Hampson, 1913)

Synonyms
- Noorda flavidalis Hampson, 1913; Psara melanosoma Hampson, 1918

Species of moth

Protepicorsia flavidalis is a moth in the family Crambidae. It was described by George Hampson in 1913. It is found in Peru.
