= Nahuel Oviedo =

Argentine footballer

Personal information
- Full name: Nahuel Oviedo Betancourt
- Date of birth: 9 May 1990 (age 36)
- Place of birth: Buenos Aires, Argentina
- Height: 1.83 m (6 ft 0 in)
- Position: Forward

Senior career*
Years	Team	Apps	(Gls)
2010–2015	Huracán	22	(3)
2012–2014	→ Sportivo Italiano (loan)	23	(4)
2015	→ San Antonio Unido (loan)	11	(8)
2015–2018	San Telmo	35	(8)
2016	→ Deportes La Serena (loan)	6	(0)
Total		97	(23)
- * Club domestic league appearances and goals

Nahuel Oviedo Bentancourt (born 9 May 1990) is a former Argentine footballer who played as a forward.

== Personal life ==
In July 2018, Oviedo was arrested for the murder of fellow footballer Facundo Espíndola. He was sentenced to 14 years in prison in February 2020.
