= Protepicorsia magnifovealis =

Scientific classification
- Kingdom: Animalia
- Phylum: Arthropoda
- Class: Insecta
- Order: Lepidoptera
- Family: Crambidae
- Genus: Protepicorsia
- Species: P. magnifovealis

Binomial name
- Protepicorsia magnifovealis (Hampson, 1918)

Synonyms
- Hapalia magnifovealis Hampson, 1918

Species of moth

Protepicorsia magnifovealis is a moth in the family Crambidae. It was described by George Hampson in 1918. It is found in Peru.
