= Palpusia eurypalpalis =

Scientific classification
- Kingdom: Animalia
- Phylum: Arthropoda
- Class: Insecta
- Order: Lepidoptera
- Family: Crambidae
- Genus: Palpusia
- Species: P. eurypalpalis

Binomial name
- Palpusia eurypalpalis (Hampson, 1912)

Synonyms
- Pilocrocis eurypalpalis Hampson, 1912

Species of moth

Palpusia eurypalpalis is a moth in the family Crambidae. It was described by George Hampson in 1912. It is found in Costa Rica and Cuba.
