= Palpusia terminalis =

Scientific classification
- Kingdom: Animalia
- Phylum: Arthropoda
- Class: Insecta
- Order: Lepidoptera
- Family: Crambidae
- Genus: Palpusia
- Species: P. terminalis

Binomial name
- Palpusia terminalis (Dognin, 1910)

Synonyms
- Sylepta terminalis Dognin, 1910

Species of moth

Palpusia terminalis is a moth in the family Crambidae. It was described by Paul Dognin in 1910. It is found in Peru.
