= Palpusia =

Scientific classification
- Kingdom: Animalia
- Phylum: Arthropoda
- Class: Insecta
- Order: Lepidoptera
- Family: Crambidae
- Subfamily: Spilomelinae
- Tribe: Spilomelini
- Genus: Palpusia; Amsel, 1956

Genus of moths

Palpusia is a genus of moths of the family Crambidae. The genus was erected by Hans Georg Amsel in 1956.

== Species ==
- Palpusia coenulentalis (Lederer, 1863)
- Palpusia eurypalpalis (Hampson, 1912)
- Palpusia fulvicolor (Hampson, 1917)
- Palpusia glaucusalis (Walker, 1859)
- Palpusia goniopalpia (Hampson, 1912)
- Palpusia plumipes (Dognin, 1905)
- Palpusia ptyonota (Hampson, 1912)
- Palpusia squamipes Amsel, 1956
- Palpusia subcandidalis (Dognin, 1905)
- Palpusia terminalis Dognin, 1910
