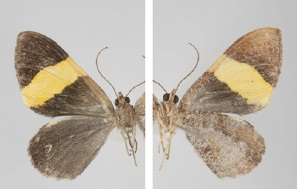
- Male (dorsal view left and ventral view)

Scientific classification
- Domain: Eukaryota
- Kingdom: Animalia
- Phylum: Arthropoda
- Class: Insecta
- Order: Lepidoptera
- Family: Geometridae
- Genus: Hagnagora
- Species: H. luteoradiata

Binomial name
- Hagnagora luteoradiata (Thierry-Mieg, 1892)

Synonyms
- Heterusia luteoradiata Thierry-Mieg, 1892

= Hagnagora luteoradiata =

Species of moth

Hagnagora luteoradiata is a species of moth of the family Geometridae first described by Paul Thierry-Mieg in 1892. It is found from Costa Rica to Ecuador.

The most prominent difference from related species is the absence of the yellow blotches on the hindwings that are present in both Hagnagora ephestris and Hagnagora discordata. The transversal yellow band on the forewing is broader than in H. discordata and has a different shape than in H. ephestris.

== Gallery ==
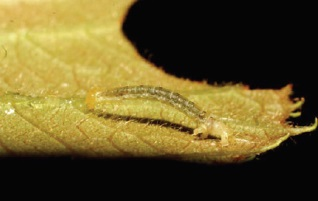
Young larva

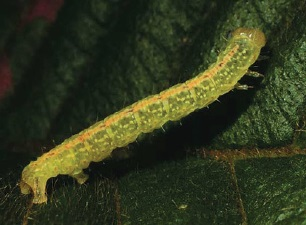
Final-instar larva
