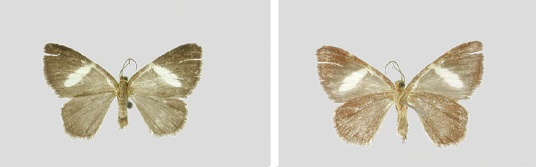
- Male (dorsal view left and ventral view)

Scientific classification
- Domain: Eukaryota
- Kingdom: Animalia
- Phylum: Arthropoda
- Class: Insecta
- Order: Lepidoptera
- Family: Geometridae
- Genus: Hagnagora
- Species: H. guatica

Binomial name
- Hagnagora guatica (Schaus, 1927)

Synonyms
- Scordylia guatica Schaus, 1927

= Hagnagora guatica =

Species of insect

Hagnagora guatica is a species of moth of the family Geometridae first described by William Schaus in 1927. It is found in Guatemala.

It is the smallest Hagnagora species, lacking the typical striation on the underside of the hindwing found in all other members of the Hagnagora mortipax clade.
