= Catacocha =

- Town
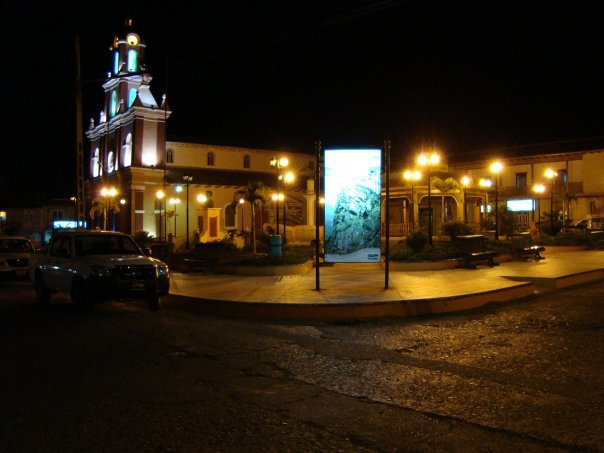
- Central park of Catacocha

- Location within Ecuador
- Coordinates: 4°3′0″S 79°39′0″W
- Country: Ecuador
- Province: Loja Province
- Canton: Paltas Canton

Government
  - Mayor: Jorge Feijoo Valarezo

Area
  - Town: 2.28 km^{2} (0.88 sq mi)

Population (2022 census)
  - Town: 7,831
  - Density: 3,430/km^{2} (8,900/sq mi)
- Climate: Cwb

Catacocha is a town in the Loja Province of Ecuador. It is the seat of the Paltas Canton.
