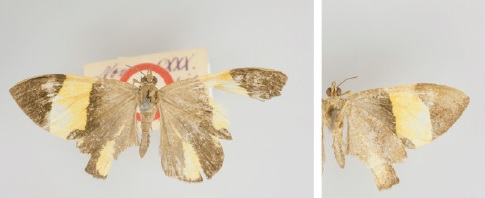
- Male (dorsal view left and ventral view)

Scientific classification
- Domain: Eukaryota
- Kingdom: Animalia
- Phylum: Arthropoda
- Class: Insecta
- Order: Lepidoptera
- Family: Geometridae
- Genus: Hagnagora
- Species: H. ephestris

Binomial name
- Hagnagora ephestris (Felder & Rogenhofer, 1875)

Synonyms
- Heterusia ephestris Felder & Rogenhofer, 1875

= Hagnagora ephestris =

Species of moth

Hagnagora ephestris is a species of moth of the family Geometridae. It is found in Colombia.

Both H. ephestris and related H. discordata show a pronounced yellow blotch on the hindwings that is absent in H. luteoradiata. Different from H. discordata, the yellow transversal band on the forewing of H. ephestris reaches the outer margin of the wing. Moreover, the band is broader than in H. discordata, whereas the yellow field of the hindwing is narrower, particularly in the proximate half of the wing.
