= Espíndola =

Espíndola or Espindola is a surname. Notable people with the surname include:

- Cacho Espíndola (1940–2004), Argentine actor
- Esteban Espíndola (born 1992), Argentine footballer
- Fabián Espíndola (born 1985), Argentine footballer
- Facundo Espíndola (1992–2018), Argentine footballer
- Hernan Espindola (born 1994), Argentine footballer
- Luis Fernando Espindola (born 1975), Uruguayan footballer
- Lucas Espíndola (born 1994), Argentine footballer
- Lucas Espindola da Silva (born 1990), Brazilian footballer
- Noelia Espíndola (born 1992), Argentine footballer
- Raúl Espíndola (born 1958), Argentine footballer
- Rodrigo Espíndola (1989–2016), Argentine footballer
- Rodrigo Andrés González Espíndola (born 1968), German bassist and singer, see Rodrigo González (musician)
