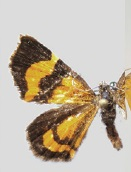
- Male

Scientific classification
- Kingdom: Animalia
- Phylum: Arthropoda
- Class: Insecta
- Order: Lepidoptera
- Family: Geometridae
- Genus: Hagnagora
- Species: H. vittata

Binomial name
- Hagnagora vittata (Philippi, 1859)

Synonyms
- Euclidia vittata Philippi, 1859; Phalaena ceraria Molina, 1782

= Hagnagora vittata =

Species of moth

"Hagnagora" vittata is a species of moth of the family Geometridae first described by Rodolfo Amando Philippi in 1859. It is found in Chile.

Larvae have been reported feeding on Fuchsia magellanica.

== Taxonomy ==
The species was provisionally removed from the genus Hagnagora. The wing pattern and particularly the wing shape diverge strongly from species in this genus.
