= El Airo, Loja =

Coordinates: 4°28′37″S 79°23′24″W

El Airo is a village located in the southern part of Ecuador's Loja province known for growing some of the best coffee in Ecuador. It is in the northwestern part of the Espindola canton about 25 km from Amaluza, the canton's capital.

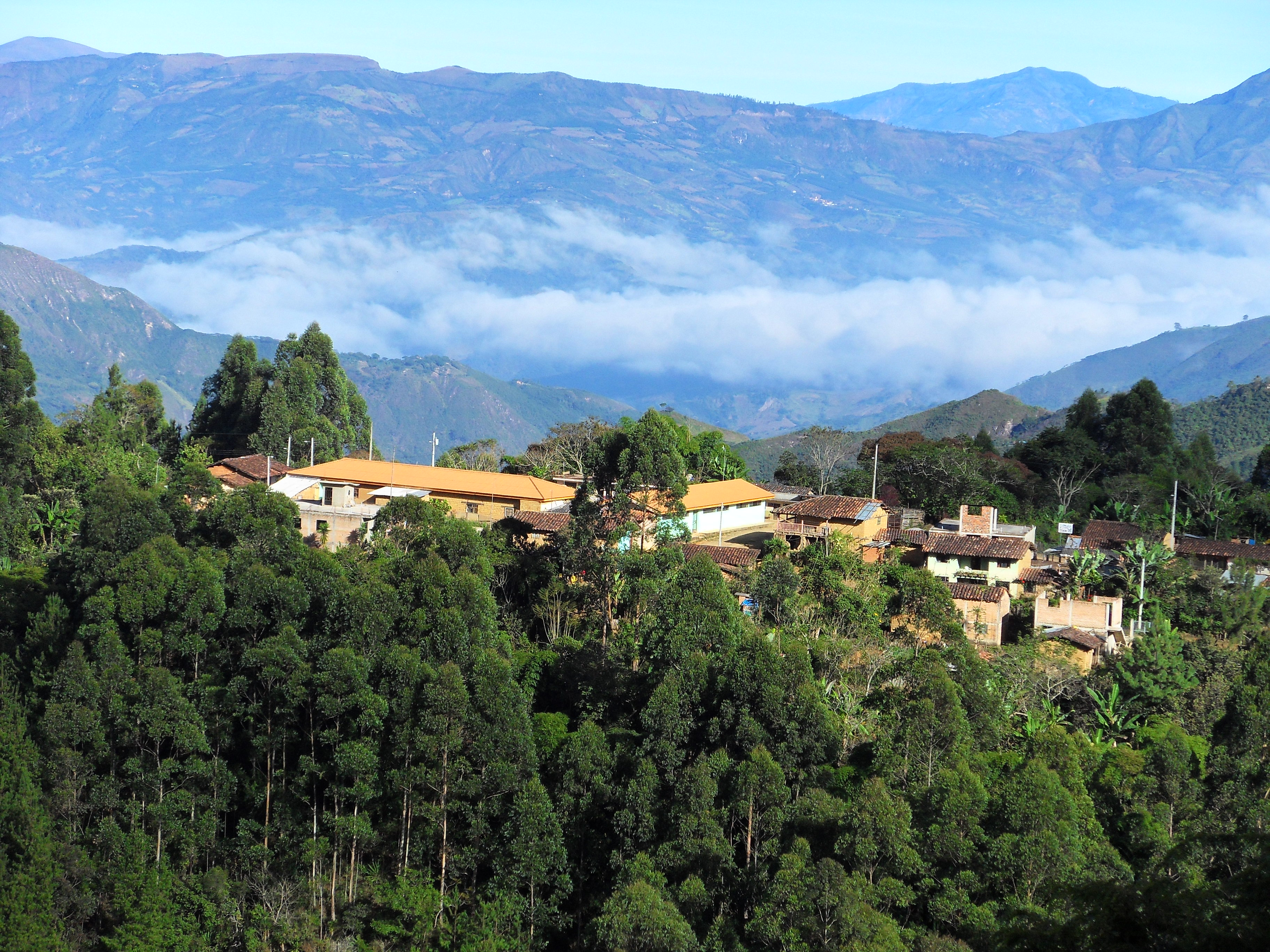

== History ==
The village of El Airo's name originates from the time of the "Patrones" or moneyed landowners, who named their hacienda El Airo due to the strong winds that existed in the area as well as its high elevation. The highest parts of El Airo are near the presumed location of the Inca Trail through Southern Ecuador. This assumption along with the rudimentary stone tools and structure foundations that have been found in El Airo suggest that the first inhabitants of the area now known as El Airo were indigenous in origin. For a large part of the 20th century El Airo existed as a hacienda with the majority of the mixed race population working the patrones' land in exchange for a small subsistence plot of their own. In the 1960s Ecuador enacted agricultural land reform which led to the majority population of El Airo gaining land and freedom from the authority of the patrón. It was at this time that the patrones left El Airo.

In 1988 led by the revered Father Ernesto Celi Roman, the leaders and inhabitants of the area began the political and legal process of converting the area into a recognized parish. This was seen as essential for the development of the area and culminated with the founding of El Airo on August 2, 1992. As part of this process a secondary school named Colegio Dos de Agosto was inaugurated on the same day as the parish was established.

== Climate ==
El Airo comprises four small neighborhoods or "barrios". La Guaca is the most populated and this is where the parish council is based. The other neighborhoods are El Tambo, El Laurel and El Batan.

The parish of El Airo is bordered by the Ecuadorian province of Zamora Chinchipe on the east and by other parishes with the canton of Espindonla on the north, west and south.

El Airo possesses a temperate climate with an average temperature of 21 °C. Within the parishes area the altitude is between 1600 and 3200 meters above sea level. Both the rivers El Airo and Chiriacu begin in the mountains of El Airo

== Population ==
The population of El Airo at the 2001 census was 1,093 inhabitants divided into 565 males and 528 women. The ethnicity of the residents is mestizo which is a mix of indigenous and Spanish ethnicities.

== Religion ==
The people of El Airo consider themselves to be Catholic and as such celebrate religious festivals such as the festival of the cross in May and a festival to the patron saint San Vicente Ferrer the first Saturday of June each year.

== Art and culture ==
The inhabitants of El Airo produce small handcrafted goods such as decorative pillows, handbags and doilies. Traditional satchels are also produced and can be either decorative or functional. These satchels range in size and be put on a donkey to carry heavy produce or over the shoulder for lighter loads.

== Agriculture and economy ==
El Airo's economy centers on agriculture. The majority of families in El Airo dedicate themselves to the cultivation of coffee as a cash crop. This crop is the principal source of income for almost every family, is recognized as one of the best in Ecuador and is grown organically. Sugar cane, yucca, banana and a variety of fruits are also grown for sustenance. Most families also raise chickens, pigs and a few have cattle and cuyes (guinea pigs).

Because of coffee's importance the inhabitants of El Airo have organized themselves into coffee cooperatives. These cooperatives exist to improve crop management and quality and negotiate better prices for members’ harvest. The organizations are: APROCAIRO which placed #2 in the Taza Dorada Ecuadorian coffee contest in 2009, and Mercedes de Jesús Molina.

== Tourism ==
El Airo is a destination for those interested in coffee, outdoor and cultural tourism through its community tourism association, CoffeeWorks. National Park Yacuri is within El Airo's limits and as such several natural points of interest exist within the parish such as highland paramo lakes (Las Rositas) and several waterfalls. The most interesting of these is located at 2000 meters above sea level and is called El Palmo because of the solitary palm tree at the top of its fall. Some visitors come to El Airo to observe organic coffee agriculture as well.

== Flora and fauna ==
El Airo has several bird, butterfly and animal species. In the highlands area the spectacled bear has been spotted by locals.

== Communication ==
El Airo recently was connected to the Ecuadorian mobile phone network and for much longer has received radio and television reception including some channels from Peru because of its proximity to the border.

== Transport ==
Transport within El Airo is mostly by foot, donkey or motorcycle. Transport in and out of El Airo is provided by one bus a day as well as two rancheras (open air bus/truck combos)
