= Palpusia squamipes =

Scientific classification
- Kingdom: Animalia
- Phylum: Arthropoda
- Class: Insecta
- Order: Lepidoptera
- Family: Crambidae
- Genus: Palpusia
- Species: P. squamipes

Binomial name
- Palpusia squamipes Amsel, 1956

Species of moth

Palpusia squamipes is a moth in the family Crambidae. It is found in Venezuela.
