= Protepicorsia thyriphora =

Scientific classification
- Kingdom: Animalia
- Phylum: Arthropoda
- Class: Insecta
- Order: Lepidoptera
- Family: Crambidae
- Genus: Protepicorsia
- Species: P. thyriphora

Binomial name
- Protepicorsia thyriphora (Hampson, 1899)

Synonyms
- Pionea thyriphora Hampson, 1899

Species of moth

Protepicorsia thyriphora is a moth in the family Crambidae. It was described by George Hampson in 1899. It is found in Paraná, Brazil.
