= Palpusia coenulentalis =

Scientific classification
- Kingdom: Animalia
- Phylum: Arthropoda
- Class: Insecta
- Order: Lepidoptera
- Family: Crambidae
- Genus: Palpusia
- Species: P. coenulentalis

Binomial name
- Palpusia coenulentalis (Lederer, 1863)

Synonyms
- Botys coenulentalis Lederer, 1863

Species of moth

Palpusia coenulentalis is a moth in the family Crambidae. It is found in Brazil.
