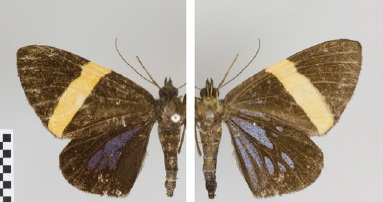
- Male (dorsal view left, and ventral)
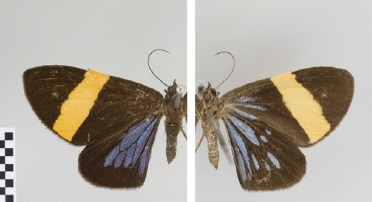
- Female (dorsal view left, and ventral)

Scientific classification
- Domain: Eukaryota
- Kingdom: Animalia
- Phylum: Arthropoda
- Class: Insecta
- Order: Lepidoptera
- Family: Geometridae
- Genus: Hagnagora
- Species: H. catagrammina

Binomial name
- Hagnagora catagrammina H. Druce, 1885

= Hagnagora catagrammina =

Species of moth

Hagnagora catagrammina is a species of moth of the family Geometridae first described by Herbert Druce in 1885. It is found in Central America, from Nicaragua to Panama.

It is closely related to the other two species of the H. buckleyi clade and particularly similar to Hagnagora buckleyi.
