= Celica, Ecuador =

Celica
- Town
- Location within Ecuador
- Coordinates: 4°6′9″S 79°57′16″W
- Country: Ecuador
- Province: Loja Province
- Canton: Celica Canton

Government
  - Mayor: Oswaldo Román Calero

Area
  - Town: 1.27 km^{2} (0.49 sq mi)

Population (2022 census)
  - Town: 4,486
  - Density: 3,530/km^{2} (9,150/sq mi)
- Time zone: ECT
- Climate: Cwb

Celica is a town in the Loja Province, Ecuador. It is the seat of the Celica Canton.
