= Sozoranga Canton =

Coordinates: 4°19′40″S 79°47′23″W

- Canton
- Location of Loja Province in Ecuador.

- Sozoranga Canton in Loja Province
- Country: Ecuador
- Province: Loja Province
- Time zone: UTC-5 (ECT)
- Website: http://www.sozoranga.gob.ec

Sozoranga Canton is a canton of Ecuador, located in the Loja Province. Its capital is the town of Sozoranga. Its population at the 2001 census was 7,994.
