= Macará Canton =

- Canton
- Location of Loja Province in Ecuador.

- Macará Canton in Loja Province
- Coordinates: 4°23′S 79°57′W
- Country: Ecuador
- Province: Loja Province

Area
  - Total: 573.1 km^{2} (221.3 sq mi)

Population (2022 census)
  - Total: 18,215
  - Density: 31.78/km^{2} (82.32/sq mi)
- Time zone: UTC-5 (ECT)

Macará Canton is a canton of Ecuador, located in the Loja Province. Its capital is the town of Macará. Its population at the 2001 census was 18,350.

The Macará River runs through the canton.

== Demographics ==
Ethnic groups as of the Ecuadorian census of 2010:

- Mestizo 90.5%
- White 4.7%
- Afro-Ecuadorian 4.2%
- Montubio 0.3%
- Indigenous 0.1%
- Other 0.1%
