= Zapotillo, Ecuador =

Zapotillo
- Town
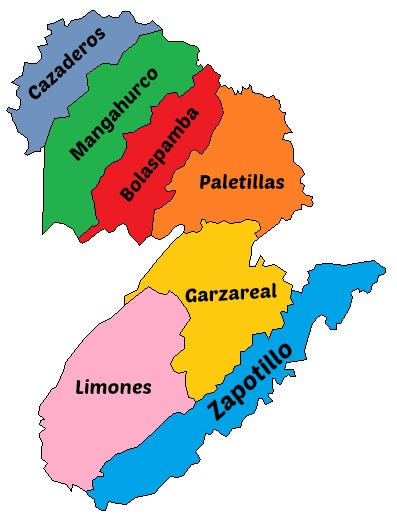
- Zapptillo on the political map of Loja province

- Location within Ecuador
- Coordinates: 4°23′11″S 80°14′37″W
- Country: Ecuador
- Province: Loja
- Canton: Zapotillo Canton

Area
  - Town: 2.39 km^{2} (0.92 sq mi)

Population (2022 census)
  - Town: 3,599
  - Density: 1,510/km^{2} (3,900/sq mi)
- Climate: BSh
- Website: www.manabi.gov.ec/cantones16-san-vicente/

Zapotillo is a town in the Loja province of Ecuador and the capital of Zapotillo Canton.
