= Vilcabamba, Ecuador =

Village in Loja Province, Ecuador

- Parish
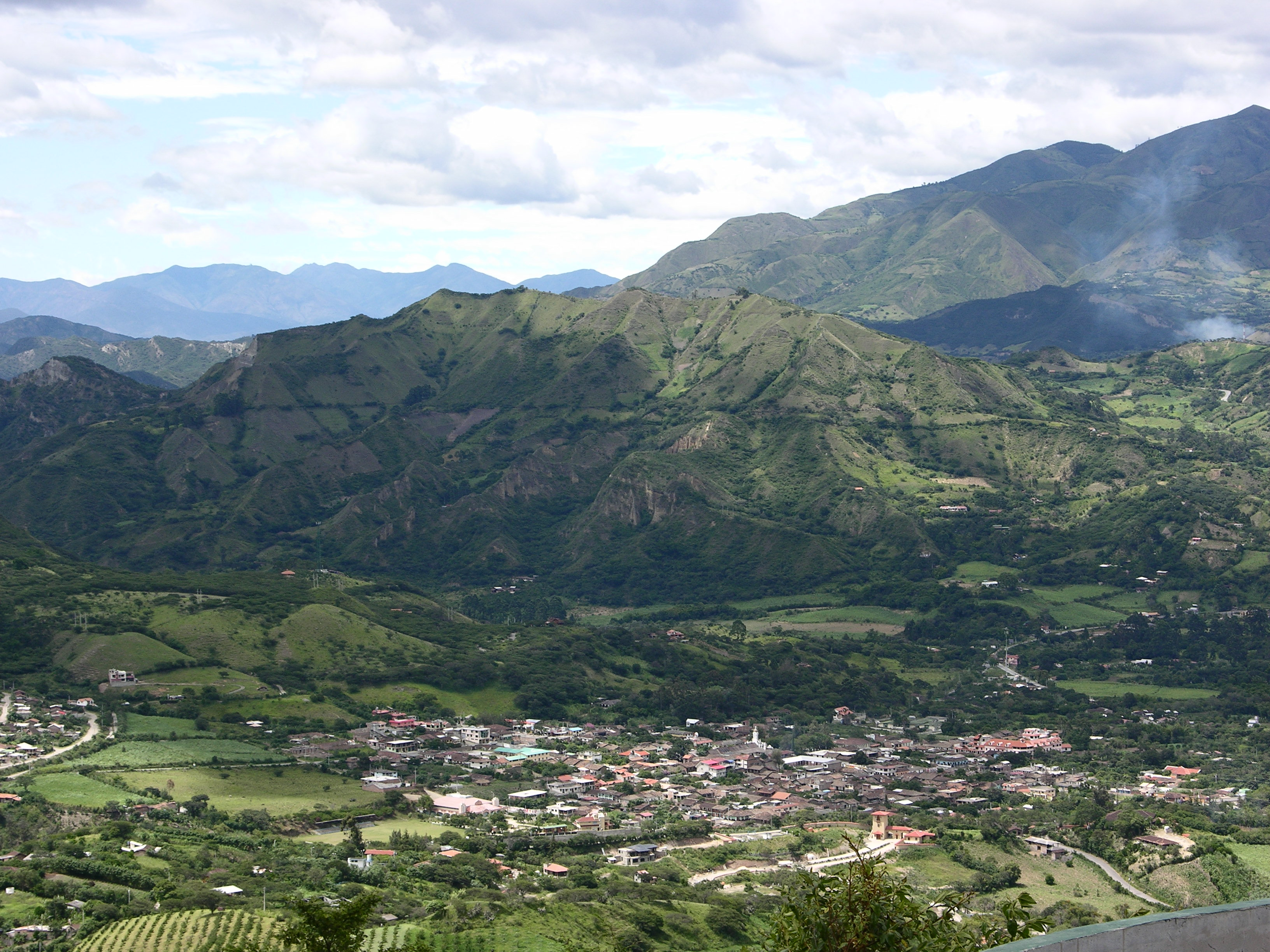
- Town and valley of Vilcabamba

- Location within Ecuador
- Country: Ecuador
- Province: Loja Province

Population (2012)
  - Total: 4,478

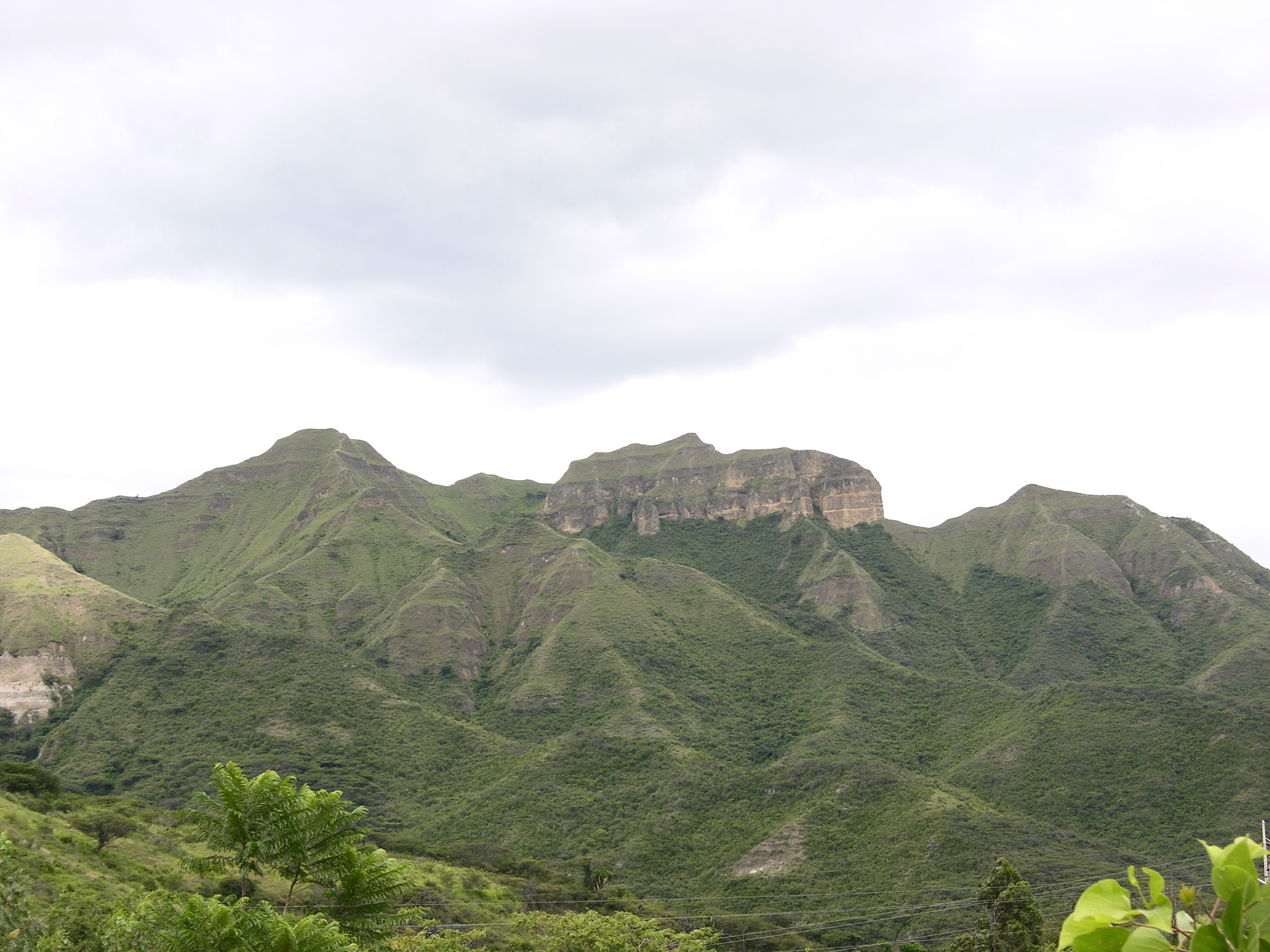
Mandango, the Sleeping Inca

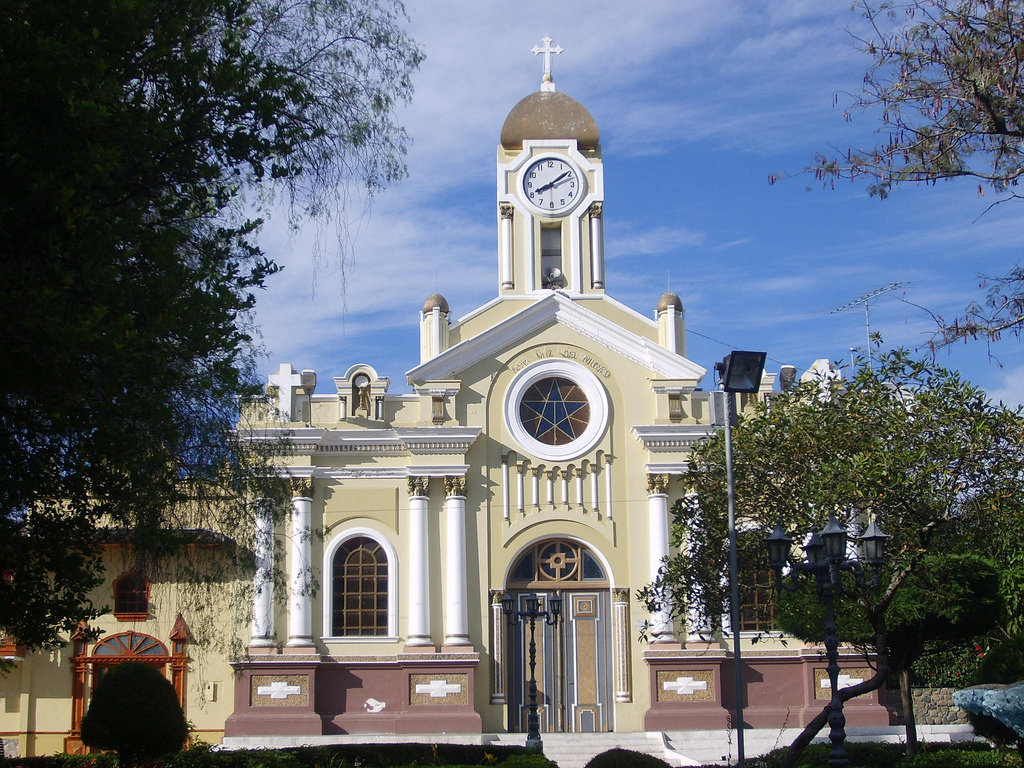
Church on the main square of Vilcabamba

Vilcabamba is a village in the southern region of Ecuador, in Loja Province, about 45 km (28 mi) south of the city of Loja. The name ‘Vilcabamba’ apparently derives from the Quichua ‘huilco pamba’. Huilco denotes the sacred trees, Anadenanthera colubrina, that grow in the region; pamba (cognate with pampa) means ‘plain’.The area has been referred to as the ‘Playground of the Inca’, which refers to its historic use as a retreat for Incan royalty. The valley is overlooked by a mountain called Mandango, the Sleeping Inca, which is said to protect the area from earthquakes and other natural disasters.

== Longevity of residents ==
=== Reputation ===
Located in a historical and scenic valley, it is a common destination for tourists, in part because it is widely believed that its inhabitants live to a very old age. Locals assert that it is not uncommon to see a person reach 100 years of age and it is claimed that many have lived to 120 and even to 135, which would make it an area with the oldest inhabitants in the world. It is often called the Valley of Longevity.

In 1973 Dr. Alexander Leaf of Harvard Medical School introduced these people to the rest of the world in his cover story for National Geographic Magazine.

=== Skepticism of claims ===
According to The Bewildering History of the History of Longevity by Peter Laslett, ‘geographical variation in the incidence of long life is no doubt a reality but better general survival does not demonstrably raise the probability of extreme ages and systematic, sceptical analysis of these confidently asserted propositions has condemned them as entirely baseless.’

Longevity in Vilcabamba has been attributed to nothing more special than the benefits of exercise, a healthy diet and good treatment of the elderly by the community. Longevity of the residents has also been attributed to a result of migration of younger people to cities.

=== Age exaggeration ===
Even as Vilcabamba's international fame grew, scientists continued to investigate the secret of the villagers' longevity, but some were beginning to grow skeptical. In particular, Dr Alexander Leaf, the Harvard Medical School researcher who had been among the first to conduct research in Vilcabamba, was having doubts. His suspicions were aroused when he realized that the villagers were inconsistent in their self-reported ages. For instance, in 1971 he had met a man who reported his age as 122. When Leaf returned three years later, that same man claimed to be 134 years old.

Leaf then persuaded Dr Richard Mazess of the University of Wisconsin Madison and Dr. Sylvia Forman of the University of California Berkeley to help determine the correct ages of Vilcabamba's elderly population. They reached the conclusion that there was not a single centenarian living in Vilcabamba. The oldest person in the village was found to be 96 years old. The average age of those claiming to be over 100 years was actually 86 years. The researchers presented these results on February 27, 1978, at a workshop at the National Institutes of Health in Bethesda, Md.

Far from being the 'Valley of Longevity,' the researchers concluded that "Individual longevity in Vilcabamba is little, if any, different from that found throughout the rest of the world." Further, they reported that "Life expectancy (corrected for exaggeration) at all ages in Vilcabamba (and Loja) is, in fact, less than in the U.S."

=== Sources of error ===
Mazess and Forman identified two sources of error. First, the villagers systematically exaggerated their ages and the older they grew the greater their exaggerations became. Mazess and Forman provided the example of Miguel Carpio Mendieta (MCM):

Apparently MCM did not begin exaggerating his age until later in life. When he was 61 in 1944 he reported an age of "70". Five years later he was reputedly "80". In 1970, at age 87, he was reputedly "121" and in 1974, at 91, he was "127".

The researchers speculated that the villagers had originally exaggerated their ages in order to gain prestige in the community. This practice appeared to have been occurring for generations, long before academic researchers had arrived in the village. Additionally Dr. Leaf speculated that the international publicity, and subsequent rise in tourism, may have encouraged the villagers' exaggerations to grow more prolific.

The second source of error was the widespread use of identical names in the small community. This had initially confused researchers who had studied the baptismal and birth records. The birth-date of an identically named uncle or father would appear to confirm the extreme longevity of a resident. By asking the Vilcabambans for the names of their godparents, the researchers were able to identify the correct records for each resident.

It turned out that Vilcabamba did actually have a higher-than-normal percentage of elderly people, but that this was caused by migration patterns: Young people tended to move out of the area, while the elderly moved in.

=== Assessment ===
Although the Vilcabambans did not enjoy greater longevity than the rest of the world, researchers noted that the Vilcabamban lifestyle, which included hard work in a high altitude combined with a low-calorie, low-animal-fat diet, did seem to keep the villagers healthy and vigorous in their old age.

== Climate ==
Climate data for Vilcabamba/Malacatos, elevation 1,600 m (5,200 ft), (1961–1990)
Month	Jan	Feb	Mar	Apr	May	Jun	Jul	Aug	Sep	Oct	Nov	Dec	Year
Mean daily maximum °C (°F)	27.7 (81.9)	27.8 (82.0)	27.7 (81.9)	28.1 (82.6)	28.5 (83.3)	27.5 (81.5)	27.2 (81.0)	27.7 (81.9)	28.3 (82.9)	28.6 (83.5)	29.0 (84.2)	28.7 (83.7)	28.1 (82.5)
Daily mean °C (°F)	20.7 (69.3)	20.7 (69.3)	20.7 (69.3)	20.7 (69.3)	20.5 (68.9)	20.2 (68.4)	20.2 (68.4)	20.5 (68.9)	20.8 (69.4)	21.0 (69.8)	21.2 (70.2)	21.1 (70.0)	20.7 (69.3)
Mean daily minimum °C (°F)	14.5 (58.1)	14.6 (58.3)	14.3 (57.7)	14.3 (57.7)	13.1 (55.6)	12.6 (54.7)	12.5 (54.5)	12.6 (54.7)	12.6 (54.7)	13.1 (55.6)	13.0 (55.4)	13.6 (56.5)	13.4 (56.1)
Average precipitation mm (inches)	60.0 (2.36)	87.0 (3.43)	125.0 (4.92)	103.0 (4.06)	29.0 (1.14)	21.0 (0.83)	11.0 (0.43)	15.0 (0.59)	26.0 (1.02)	59.0 (2.32)	54.0 (2.13)	61.0 (2.40)	651 (25.63)
Source: FAO
