= Raúl Espíndola =

Argentine footballer

Personal information
- Full name: Raúl José Espíndola
- Date of birth: September 13, 1958 (age 68)
- Place of birth: Rafaela, Argentina
- Position: Midfielder

Youth career
- Atlético Rafaela

Senior career*
Years	Team	Apps	(Gls)
1974–1978	Atlético Rafaela	–	(–)
1979	Sportivo Belgrano	–	(–)
1982	Colón	32	(12)
1983–1986	Deportivo Morón	115	(35)
1986–1987	Deportivo Cuenca	37	(20)
1987–1988	Argentinos Juniors	26	(11)
1989	Cobreloa	–	(–)
1989–1991	Deportivo Morón	31	(11)
1991–1992	Talleres RdE	7	(1)
1992–1993	Deportivo Quito		
- * Club domestic league appearances and goals

Raúl José Espíndola (born September 13, 1958, in Rafaela, Santa Fe, Argentina) is a former footballer. He played for clubs in Argentina, Chile and Ecuador.

== Teams ==
- Atlético Rafaela 1974–1978
- Sportivo Belgrano 1979
- Colón 1982
- Deportivo Morón 1983–1986
- Deportivo Cuenca 1986–1987
- Argentinos Juniors 1987–1988
- Cobreloa 1989
- Deportivo Morón 1989–1991
- Talleres de Remedios de Escalada 1991–1992
- Deportivo Quito 1992–1993
