= Facundo Espíndola =

Argentine footballer

Personal information
- Full name: Facundo Julián Espíndola
- Date of birth: 26 December 1992
- Place of birth: Argentina
- Date of death: 22 July 2018 (aged 25)
- Place of death: Hurlingham, Buenos Aires, Argentina
- Height: 1.90 m (6 ft 3 in)
- Position: Goalkeeper

Youth career
- Chacarita Juniors
- River Plate
- Lanús

Senior career*
Years	Team	Apps	(Gls)
2013–2016	Club Almagro	12	(0)
2016–2017	Defensores de Belgrano		
2017	Atlético Uruguay		
- * Club domestic league appearances and goals

Facundo Julián Espíndola (26 December 1992 – 22 July 2018) was an Argentine footballer.

== Death ==
On 22 July 2018, Espíndola was attacked after leaving a bar in Hurlingham, Buenos Aires, and died from his injuries. Fellow footballer Nahuel Oviedo was arrested in connection with his death. Oviedo was sentenced to 14 years in prison in February 2020, while Ever Brizuela Cáceres, who was considered to be a participant in the attack, was sentenced to 12 years.

== Career statistics ==
Club	Season	League			Cup		Other		Total	
Club	Season	Division	Apps	Goals	Apps	Goals	Apps	Goals	Apps	Goals
Club Almagro	2013–14	Primera B Metropolitana	4	0	0	0	0	0	4	0
Club Almagro	2015	Primera B Metropolitana	6	0	0	0	0	0	6	0
Club Almagro	2016	Primera B Nacional	2	0	0	0	0	0	2	0
Career total			12	0	0	0	0	0	12	0
