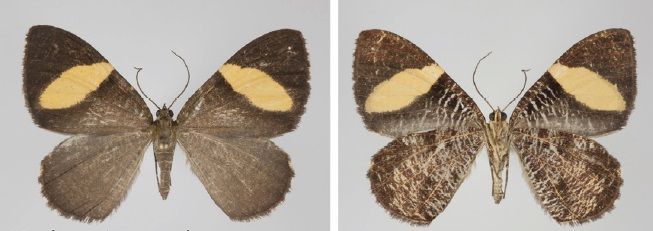
- Male (dorsal view left and ventral view)

Scientific classification
- Domain: Eukaryota
- Kingdom: Animalia
- Phylum: Arthropoda
- Class: Insecta
- Order: Lepidoptera
- Family: Geometridae
- Genus: Hagnagora
- Species: H. marionae

Binomial name
- Hagnagora marionae Brehm & Sullivan, 2005

= Hagnagora marionae =

Species of moth

Hagnagora marionae is a species of moth of the family Geometridae first described by Gunnar Brehm and J. Bolling Sullivan in 2005. It has been collected only at two high mountain areas in Costa Rica at elevations above 2,500 metres (8,200 ft).

The species resembles the other species of the H. anicata clade, but is easily distinguished by large orange-yellow blotches on the forewings.
