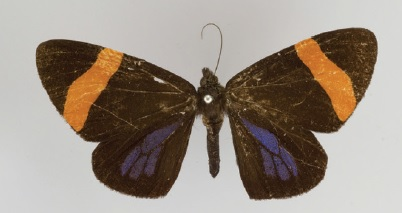
- Male
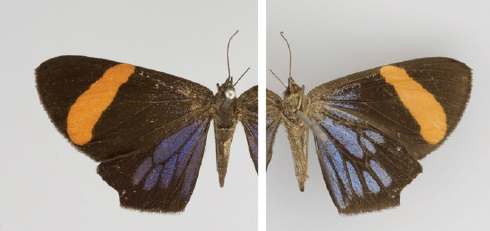
- Female (dorsal view left and ventral view)

Scientific classification
- Domain: Eukaryota
- Kingdom: Animalia
- Phylum: Arthropoda
- Class: Insecta
- Order: Lepidoptera
- Family: Geometridae
- Genus: Hagnagora
- Species: H. buckleyi

Binomial name
- Hagnagora buckleyi H. Druce, 1885

= Hagnagora buckleyi =

Species of moth

Hagnagora buckleyi is a species of moth of the family Geometridae first described by Herbert Druce in 1885. It is found in north-western Ecuador. It is named for the botanist Samuel Botsford Buckley.

The uppersides and undersides of the wings are very similar, with the colour of the hindwings generally being paler. The forewings feature a deep-orange transversal band on a dark brown background, and the hindwings show metallic-blue fields between the veins, with three located on the upperside between M3 and CuA2 and one in the cell, and eight between all veins on the underside. The pattern of the female is similar, with the blue fields extending further on the forewing, including the blotch between veins CuA2 and A. In the female, metallic-blue scales are also present at the base of the forewing at both the wing upperside and underside.
