= Catamayo =

- City
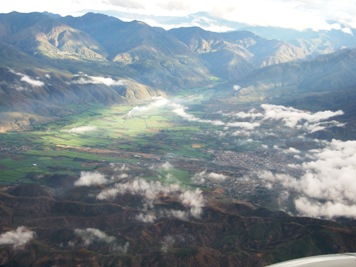

- Location within Ecuador
- Coordinates: 03°59′0″S 79°21′0″W
- Country: Ecuador
- Province: Loja Province
- Canton: Catamayo Canton

Government
  - Mayor: Janet Guerrero

Area
  - City: 14.71 km^{2} (5.68 sq mi)

Population (2022 census)
  - City: 27,026
  - Density: 1,837/km^{2} (4,758/sq mi)
- Time zone: ECT
- Climate: BSh
- Website: www.hcpl.gov.ec

Catamayo is a city in the Loja Province, Ecuador. It is the seat of the Catamayo Canton, and is located 18 kilometres (11 mi) west of the province capital, Loja.

It is served by Ciudad de Catamayo Airport.

== Climate ==
Climate data for Catamayo (La Toma), elevation 1,238 m (4,062 ft), (1961–1990)
Month	Jan	Feb	Mar	Apr	May	Jun	Jul	Aug	Sep	Oct	Nov	Dec	Year
Mean daily maximum °C (°F)	31.2 (88.2)	31.3 (88.3)	31.0 (87.8)	30.7 (87.3)	31.1 (88.0)	30.3 (86.5)	30.2 (86.4)	30.7 (87.3)	31.5 (88.7)	32.0 (89.6)	32.2 (90.0)	32.2 (90.0)	31.2 (88.2)
Daily mean °C (°F)	23.7 (74.7)	23.7 (74.7)	23.7 (74.7)	23.8 (74.8)	23.7 (74.7)	23.5 (74.3)	23.3 (73.9)	24.2 (75.6)	24.2 (75.6)	23.7 (74.7)	23.8 (74.8)	24.0 (75.2)	23.8 (74.8)
Mean daily minimum °C (°F)	16.7 (62.1)	16.8 (62.2)	16.8 (62.2)	16.6 (61.9)	16.2 (61.2)	16.3 (61.3)	16.7 (62.1)	17.2 (63.0)	17.0 (62.6)	16.7 (62.1)	16.2 (61.2)	16.8 (62.2)	16.7 (62.0)
Average precipitation mm (inches)	36.0 (1.42)	78.0 (3.07)	79.0 (3.11)	58.0 (2.28)	22.0 (0.87)	11.0 (0.43)	2.0 (0.08)	7.0 (0.28)	16.0 (0.63)	45.0 (1.77)	25.0 (0.98)	29.0 (1.14)	408 (16.06)
Average relative humidity (%)	76	76	76	76	73	71	65	59	63	68	70	70	70
Source: FAO
