= Macará River =

River in Peru and Ecuador

The Macará River forms part of the border between Ecuador and Peru.
