= Quilanga Canton =

- Canton
- Location of Loja Province in Ecuador.

- Quilanga Canton in Loja Province
- Coordinates: 4.2980°S 79.3986°W
- Country: Ecuador
- Province: Loja Province

Population (2001)
  - Total: 4,582
- Time zone: UTC-5 (ECT)

Quilanga Canton is a canton of Ecuador, in the Loja Province. Its capital is the town of Quilanga. Its population at the 2001 census was 4,582.
