= Pindal Canton =

- Canton
- Location of Loja Province in Ecuador.

- Pindal Canton in Loja Province
- Coordinates: 4.1161°S 80.1076°W
- Country: Ecuador
- Province: Loja Province
- Time zone: UTC-5 (ECT)

Pindal Canton is a canton of Ecuador, located in the Loja Province. Its capital is the town of Pindal. Its population at the 2001 census was 7,351.
