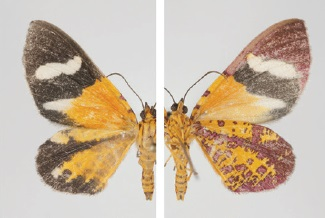
- Male (dorsal view left and ventral)
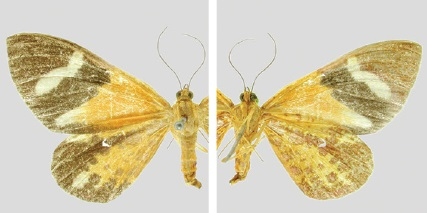
- Female (dorsal view left and ventral)

Scientific classification
- Domain: Eukaryota
- Kingdom: Animalia
- Phylum: Arthropoda
- Class: Insecta
- Order: Lepidoptera
- Family: Geometridae
- Genus: Hagnagora
- Species: H. croceitincta

Binomial name
- Hagnagora croceitincta (Dognin, 1892)

Synonyms
- Polythrena croceitincta Dognin, 1892; Heterusia epimena Bastelberger, 1908

= Hagnagora croceitincta =

Species of moth

Hagnagora croceitincta is a species of moth of the family Geometridae first described by Paul Dognin in 1892. It is found from central Colombia to south-eastern Peru.

The length of the forewings is about 23 mm. Adults are conspicuously coloured, with orange, dark brown and white patterns.
