= Macará =

- City
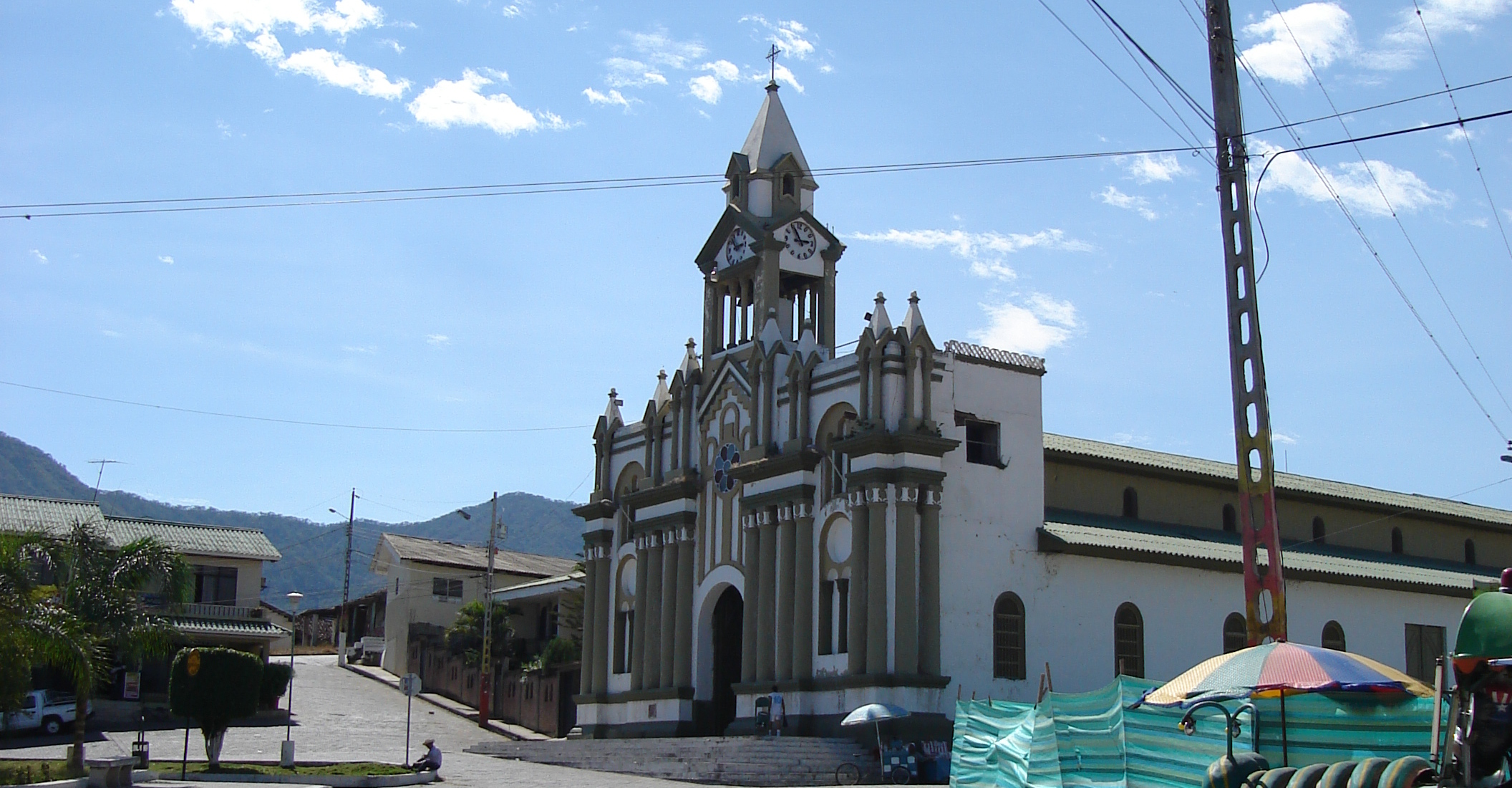
- Catholic church in Macará,

- Location within Ecuador
- Coordinates: 04°23′S 79°57′W
- Country: Ecuador
- Province: Loja
- Canton: Macará

Area
  - City: 4.98 km^{2} (1.92 sq mi)

Population (2022 census)
  - City: 12,454
  - Density: 2,500/km^{2} (6,480/sq mi)
- Climate: BSh

Macará is a city in the Loja Province of Ecuador. It is the seat of the Macará Canton and is located on the border between Ecuador and Peru.

The population as of the 2001 census was 11,483.

It is served by José María Velasco Ibarra Airport.

== Climate ==
Climate data for Macará (José María Velasco Ibarra Airport), elevation 430 m (1,410 ft), (1971–2000)
Month	Jan	Feb	Mar	Apr	May	Jun	Jul	Aug	Sep	Oct	Nov	Dec	Year
Mean daily maximum °C (°F)	31.2 (88.2)	31.3 (88.3)	30.1 (86.2)	31.2 (88.2)	30.2 (86.4)	30.9 (87.6)	30.2 (86.4)	31.0 (87.8)	32.0 (89.6)	32.0 (89.6)	31.9 (89.4)	32.2 (90.0)	31.2 (88.1)
Mean daily minimum °C (°F)	19.4 (66.9)	20.1 (68.2)	20.0 (68.0)	18.8 (65.8)	18.0 (64.4)	16.4 (61.5)	15.2 (59.4)	15.4 (59.7)	15.7 (60.3)	16.2 (61.2)	16.4 (61.5)	17.6 (63.7)	17.4 (63.4)
Average precipitation mm (inches)	59.0 (2.32)	111.0 (4.37)	232.0 (9.13)	103.0 (4.06)	15.0 (0.59)	5.0 (0.20)	0.0 (0.0)	1.0 (0.04)	2.0 (0.08)	7.0 (0.28)	2.0 (0.08)	4.0 (0.16)	541 (21.31)
Average relative humidity (%)	65	69	75	72	71	68	64	61	59	59	58	58	65
Source: FAO

== See also ==
- List of cities in Ecuador
