= Zapotillo Canton =

Zapotillo Canton Zapotillo Hermoso, Paraiso escondido en la tierra, Centinela de la Patria
- Canton
- Location of Loja Province in Ecuador.

- Zapotillo Canton in Loja Province
- Coordinates: 4.3873°S 80.2454°W
- Country: Ecuador
- Province: Loja Province
- Capital: Zapotillo

Area
  - Total: 1,212 km^{2} (468 sq mi)
- Elevation: 325 m (1,066 ft)

Population (2022 census)
  - Total: 14,571
  - Density: 12.02/km^{2} (31.14/sq mi)
- Time zone: UTC-5 (ECT)

Zapotillo Canton is a canton of Ecuador, located in the Loja Province. Its capital is the town of Zapotillo. Its population at the 2001 census was 10,940.

== General information ==
Header Cantonal: Zapotillo

Elevation: 325 m.s.n.m

Average temperature: 26 °C

Area: 1238 Km2

Climate: Subtropical dry

Location: Southeast of the province of Loja

Limits:
North and South: Republic of Peru
East Puyango Canton, Pinal, and Macara Celica
West. Republic of Peru

Political Division:
1 urban parish, 5 rural parishes and 69 barrios

urban parish: Zapotillo

rural parishes: Mangahurco, Garzarreal, Lemons, Paletillas, and Bolaspamba

TRADITIONAL PARTY

- Cantonization August 27
- Religious celebration January 20
