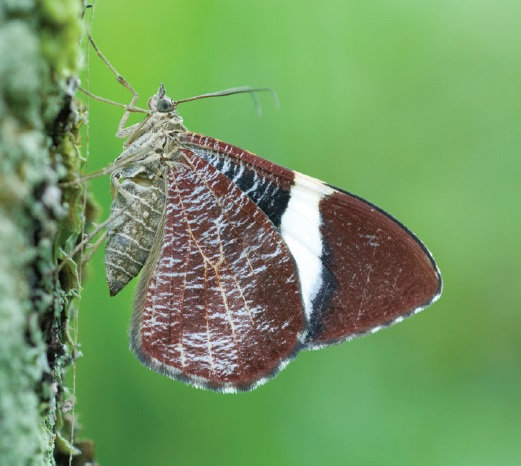

Scientific classification
- Domain: Eukaryota
- Kingdom: Animalia
- Phylum: Arthropoda
- Class: Insecta
- Order: Lepidoptera
- Family: Geometridae
- Genus: Hagnagora
- Species: H. anicata

Binomial name
- Hagnagora anicata (Felder & Rogenhofer, 1875)

Synonyms
- Heterusia anicata Felder & Rogenhofer, 1875

= Hagnagora anicata =

Species of moth

Hagnagora anicata is a species of moth of the family Geometridae first described by Felder and Rogenhofer in 1875. It is a species complex with a range that extends from Mexico to Bolivia and east into western Venezuela paralleling the Andes. A population occurs on Jamaica. While traditionally considered a single species, DNA barcode and genitalic analyses indicate that five or more species are probably involved in the complex.

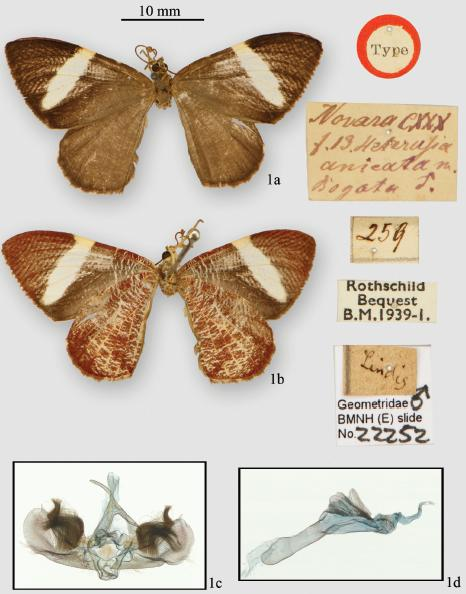
Male lectotype: 1a. dorsal view; 1b. ventral view; 1c. genital capsule and 1d. aedeagus (BMNH slide 22252)

Adults have a cream-white band, originating on the costa near the midpoint and running diagonally toward a point 1/3 above the tornus, rounding off and ending without touching the margin. Distal to this band is dark brown scaling to the wing apex. Proximal to the band is dark brown scaling which becomes brighter toward the wing base. At the terminus of the wing veins are small white crescents which are usually worn off in flown specimens. The hindwing is the brownish color of the forewing base and with larger marginal crescents at the vein termini. The underside is repeated with some slight variation.
