= Paltas Canton =

Coordinates: 4°3′0″S 79°39′0″W

- Canton
- Location of Loja Province in Ecuador

- Paltas Canton in Loja Province
- Country: Ecuador
- Province: Loja Province

Area
  - Total: 1,156 km^{2} (446 sq mi)

Population (2022 census)
  - Total: 22,841
  - Density: 19.76/km^{2} (51.17/sq mi)

Paltas Canton is located to the south of Loja city and is one of the oldest cantons of province of the same name. It was named after the Paltas, a community who used to live over the new city now called Catacocha in Ecuador.

Shiriculapo is a pick of the mountain which holds the capital, Catacocha. Mostly foggy during night, even though down the valley of Casanga, Macandamine, Yamana, Playas and Naranjo has a temperature that goes over the normal at its capital.
