= Loja Province =

Province of Ecuador

Province of Loja Provincia de Loja (Spanish)
- Province
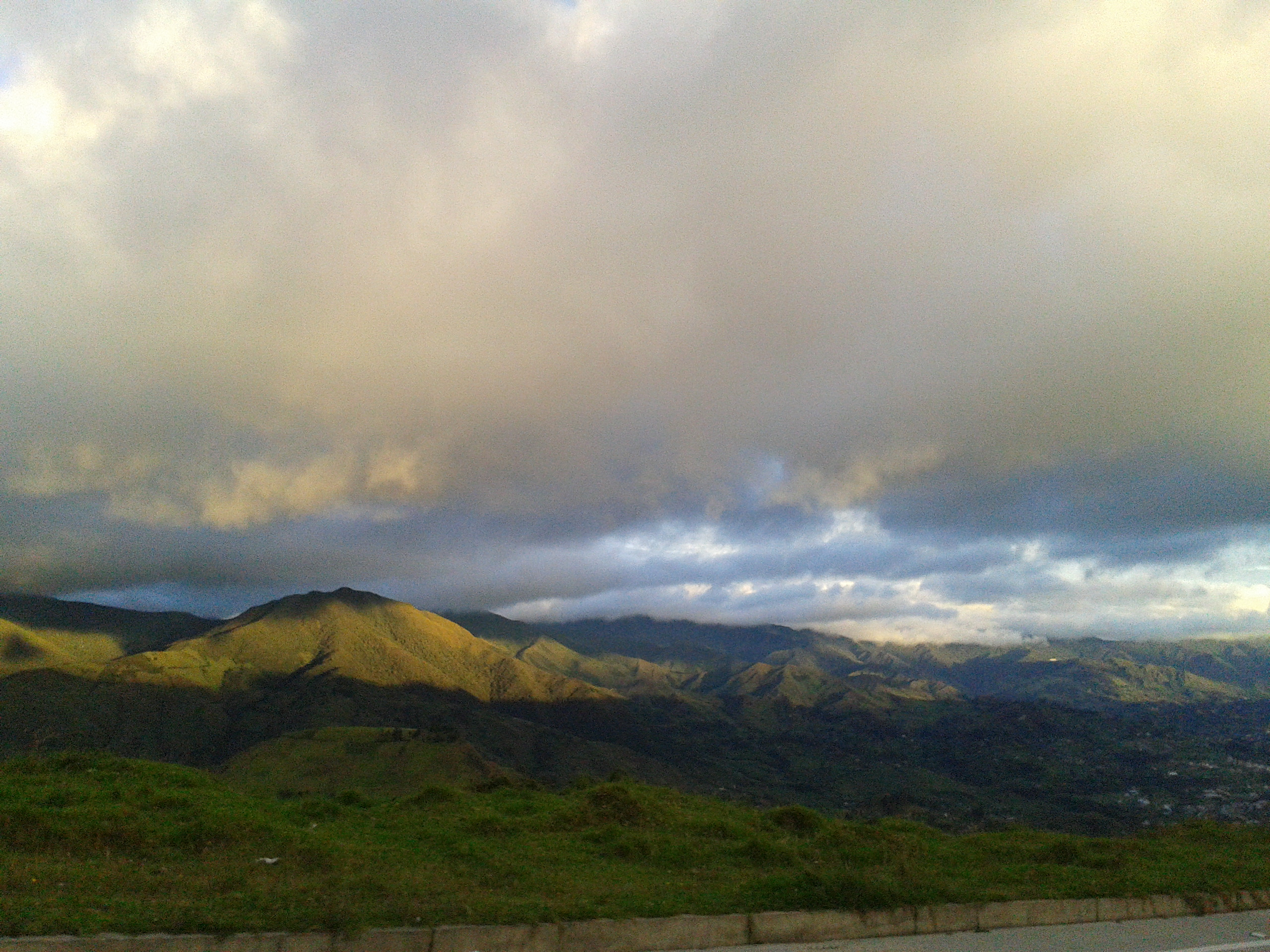
- Loja Canton

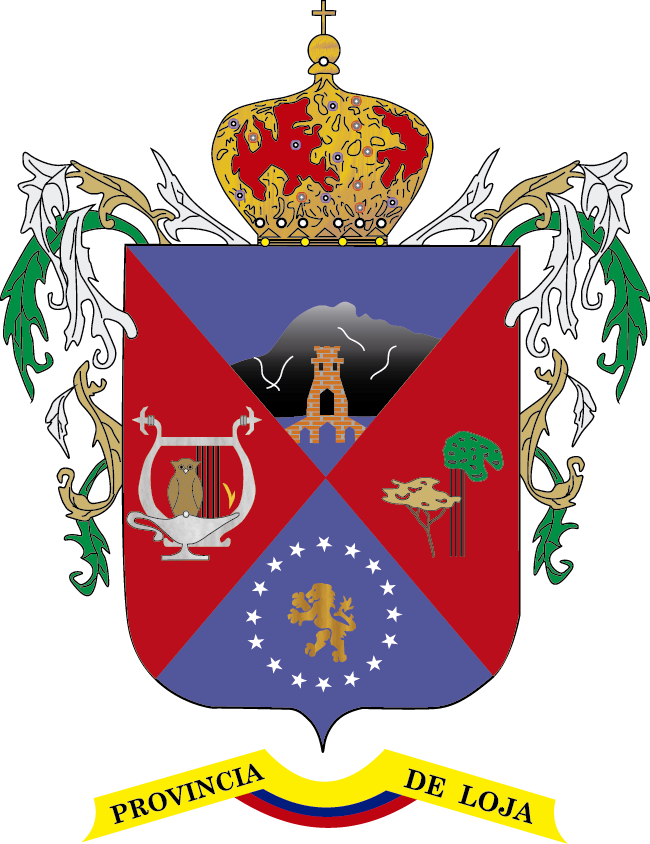
- Flag Seal

- Location in Ecuador

- Coordinates: 4°1′19″S 79°29′2″W
- Country: Ecuador
- Capital: Loja

Government
  - Prefect: Mario Mancino (SUMA)
  - Vice Prefect: María José Sotomayor
  - Governor: Alexandra Jara

Area
  - Total: 11,066 km^{2} (4,273 sq mi)
- Elevation: 2,225 m (7,300 ft)

Population (2022 census)
  - Total: 485,421
  - Density: 43.866/km^{2} (113.61/sq mi)

Languages
  - Spanish: ?%
  - Quechua: ?%
- Vehicle registration: L
- Pronunciation: (lō'hä)
- Annual rainfall: 950 mm
- HDI (2017): 0.747 high · 7th
- Website: prefecturaloja.gob.ec

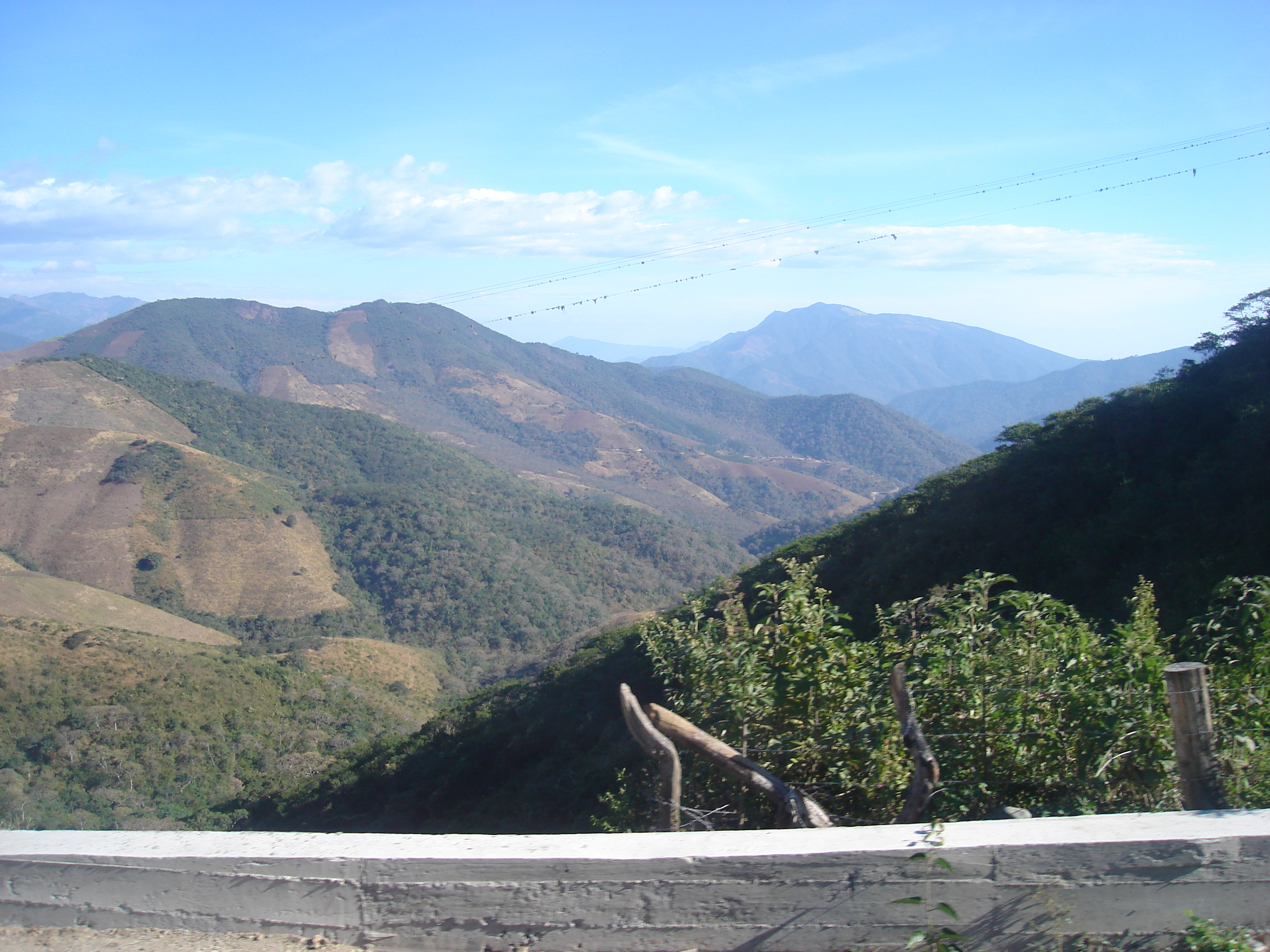
Macará Mountains

Loja Province (Spanish pronunciation: [ˈlo.xa]) is one of 24 provinces in Ecuador and shares its southern border on the west with El Oro Province, on the north with El Azuay, and on the east with Zamora-Chinchipe. Founded on its present site in 1548 by Captain Alonso de Mercadillo (Spanish), the site had been previously moved and rebuilt from La Toma due to earthquakes. It also is named as "Cuxibamba Valley", from the Quichua language, which means the "Smiley Valley".

== Overview ==
Loja is located in a high Andean valley at an elevation of 7,300 feet (2,225 m). It had a population of 448,966 inhabitants at the 2010 census. It is recognized as being a friendly and pleasant city. This was demonstrated when Loja, both the provincial capital and one of the oldest cities in Ecuador, won a community involvement award in 2001 in recognition of the community's ongoing effort to support and to protect the environment.

Surrounded by two rivers, the Zamora and Malacatos, Loja has a variety of microclimates. This unique position results in numerous ecological zones. Based between the humid Amazon basin and the coastal sechura desert in Peru the environment consists of páramo, cloud forest and jungle landscapes. 86% of the province is covered by hills or mountains.

Its historical buildings and colonial architecture make the city of Loja a popular tourist attraction.

Famous for the Vírgen del Cisne religious festivals it organizes in September every year, Loja is also known for its musicians. The city has a number of important music academies, including the Conservatorio Nacional de Musica, the house of the most influential musicians in Ecuador. The city is commonly referred to as the 'musical capital of Ecuador.' There are also two universities, Universidad Tecnica Particular De Loja and Universidad Nacional de Loja. There is an important law school here as well.

Just south of Loja (42 km) is Vilcabamba, which is known as the Valley of Longevity. Inhabitants of this community enjoy a long life span due to its ideal climate and local hot springs. Researchers and scientists have regularly visited the town, studying its geographical conditions, climate, soil and water. Articles have even appeared in well known periodicals such as Reader's Digest and National Geographic magazine, providing their own theories to the longevity of Vilcabamba's inhabitants.

Loja is credited with being the first city in Ecuador to have acquired the means to produce electricity. Electric power was supplied to the city by the introduction of the Itaipu Hydroelectric Dam, the original structure of which was completed in 1896.

== Economy ==
A lot of investment has been made recently in the cochinilla farms that provide commodities for both the textile and cosmetic industries. La Toma historically has provided suitable conditions for many sugar plantations. Commodities such as sugar and coffee are not often grown to be exported internationally like cochinilla, but are instead bought and sold domestically.

Loja Province has seen its fair share of mining, predominantly gold and bauxite, which has consequently caused damage to the environment.

== Demographics ==
Ethnic groups as of the Ecuadorian census of 2010:

- Mestizo 90.2%
- Indigenous 3.7%
- White 3.9%
- Afro-Ecuadorian 1.4%
- Montubio 0.7%
- Other 0.1%

== Government and politics ==
Loja Province, much like other divisions in Ecuador, is divided into three main institutions.

- Municipio, which is elected by the population every four years and is headed by the Mayor (Jorge Bailón as of 2021)
- Prefectura, which is the government at a local level and is headed by the Prefecto. This institution is responsible for all the 16 cantons and is elected by the population every four years.
- Gobernacion delegates the work from the president which is concentrated at the national level. The candidate is elected by the president himself.

== Ecology ==
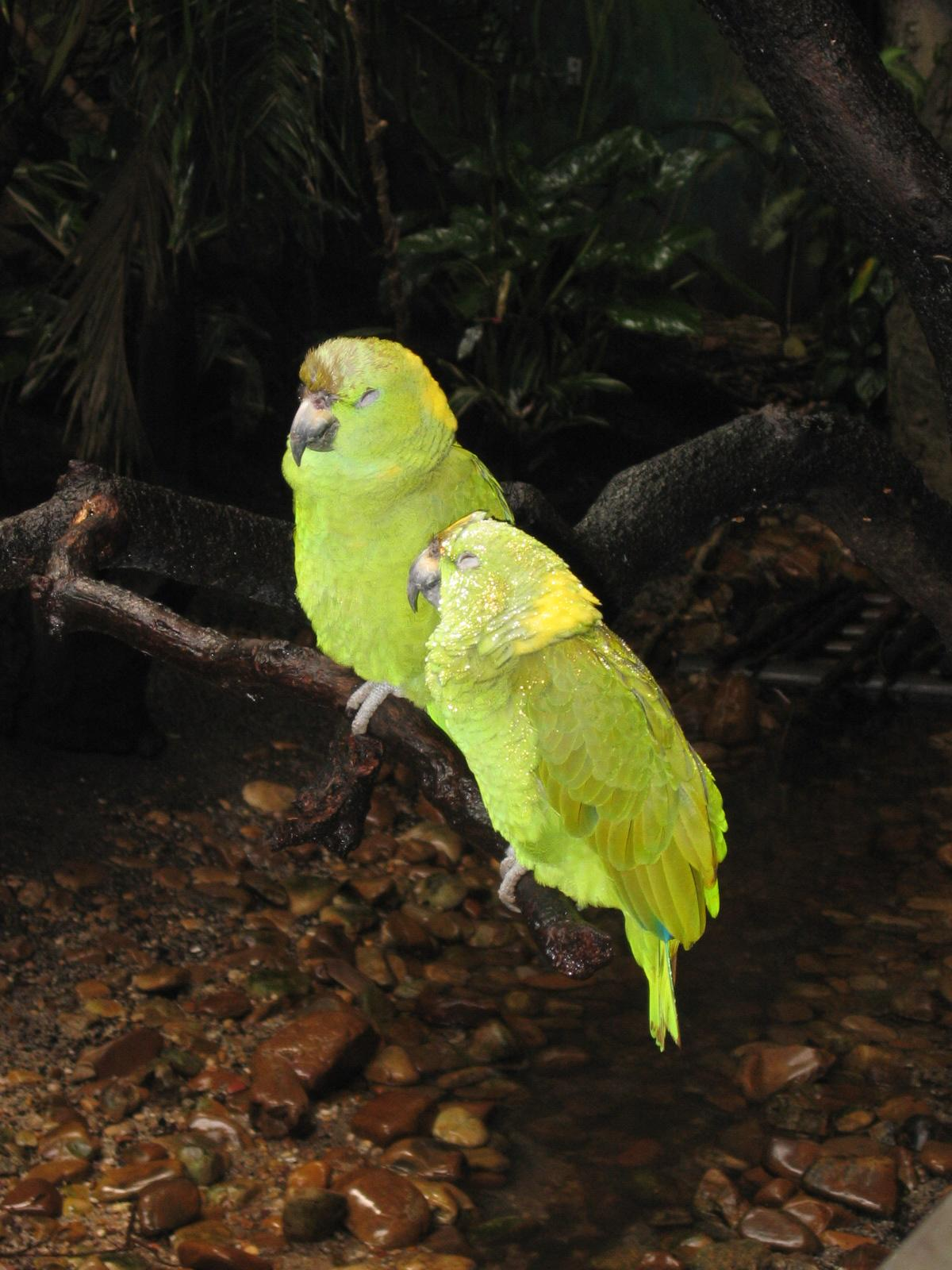
Amazon parrot

The region is famous for plants, bird species, and butterflies which can often be seen in protected national parks, the most important being Podocarpus. This park is 1,463 square kilometres and has an elevation ranging from 1000 m to 3690 m. The park is home for a number of animals like bears and pumas as well as exotic birdlife. Over 40% of the park's 3,000–4,000 plant species are endemic, unique to this area. There are also more than 600 species of birds here.

- Cherimoyas: This edible fruit occurs naturally in Loja Province, in the localities of Amaluza, Cariamanga, Gonzanamá, and Vilcabamba. Its natural occurrence comprises altitudes of 1500 to 2000 meters of altitude. Mean optimal annual temperature for cherimoya growing in Ecuador is between 18 and 20 °C. Optimal annual precipitation is 800 – 1,000 mm.

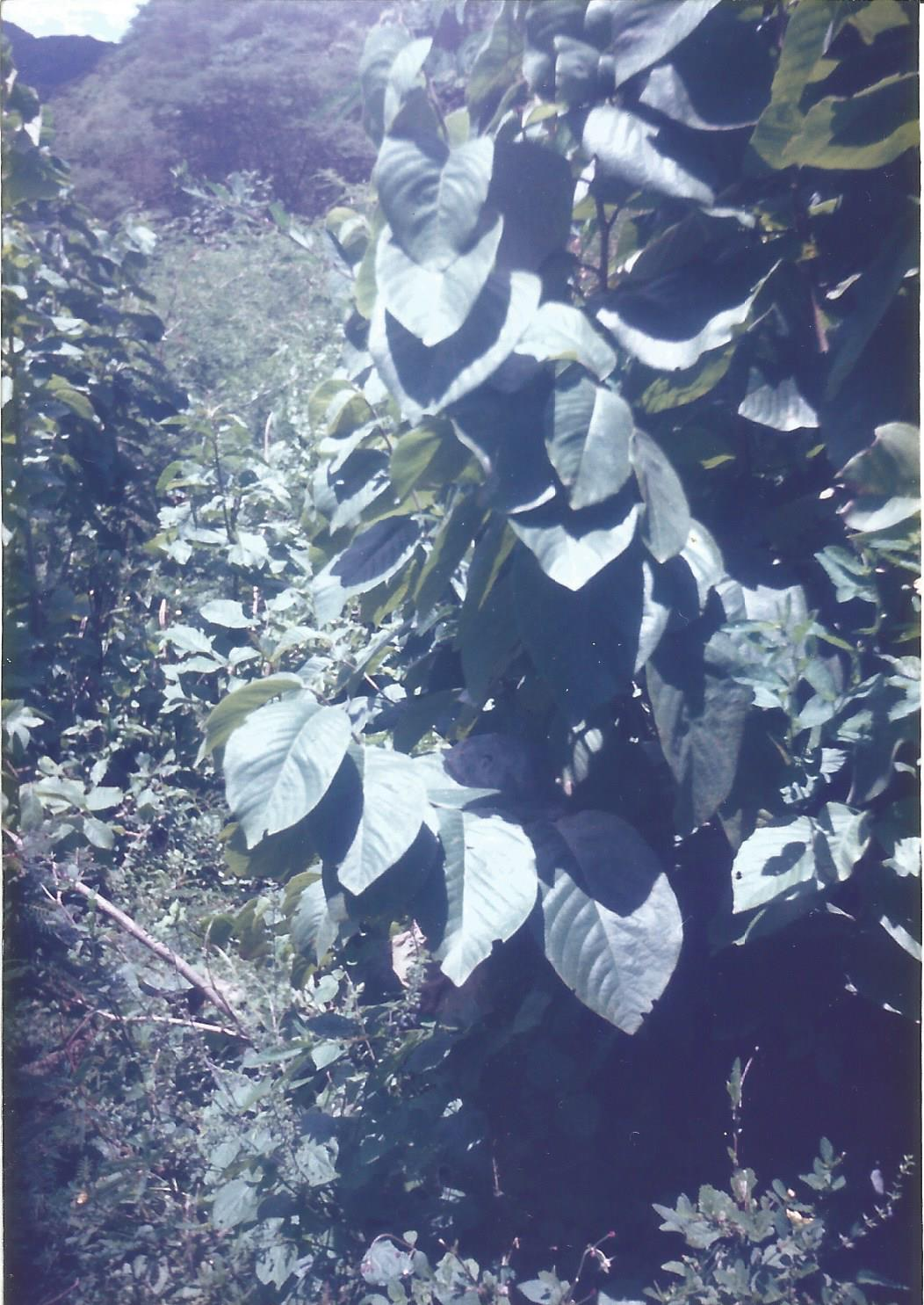
Wild cherimoya plants in Vilcabamba, Ecuador

== Cantons ==
The province is divided into 16 cantons. The following table lists each with its population at the 2010 census, its area in square kilometres (km^{2}), and the name of its canton seat or capital.

Canton	Pop. (2010)	Area (km^{2})	Seat/capital
Calvas	28,185	841,1	Cariamanga
Catamayo	30,638	646	Catamayo
Celica	14,468	518	Celica
Chaguarpamba	7,161	311	Chaguarpamba
Espíndola	14,799	514	Amaluza (Espíndola)
Gonzanamá	12,716	693	Gonzanamá
Loja	214,855	1,881	Loja
Macará	19,018	575	Macará
Olmedo	4,870	112	Olmedo
Paltas	23,801	1,145	Catacocha
Pindal	8,645	200	Pindal
Puyango	15,513	634	Alamor
Quilanga	4,337	235	Quilanga
Saraguro	30,183	1,075	Saraguro
Sozoranga	7,465	410	Sozoranga
Zapotillo	12,312	1,209	Zapotillo

== See also ==
- El Airo, Loja
- Podocarpus National Park
- Provinces of Ecuador
- Cantons of Ecuador
- Saraguro people
- Vilcabamba, Ecuador
