= List of botanical gardens in Ecuador =

Botanical gardens in Ecuador have collections consisting entirely of Ecuador native and endemic species; most have a collection that include plants from around the world. There are botanical gardens and arboreta in all states and territories of Ecuador, most are administered by local governments, some are privately owned.

- Jardin Tropical de Esmeraldas, Esmeraldas
- Fundacion Jardin Botanico de Guayaquil, Guayaquil
- FInca Pastaza La Palmera Tungurahua
- Jardin Botanico Reinaldo Espinosa, Loja
- Jardín Botánico de la Universidad Técnica de Manabí, Portoviejo, Manabí
- Jardin Botanico Las Orquideas, Puyo
- Parque Pedagogico Etnobotanico OMAERE, Puyo, Pastaza
- FundRAE - Reserva Etnobotánica Cumandá Quito
- Quito Botanical Garden, Quito, Pichincha Province
- Reserva Rio Guaycuyacu Quito
- Timbre Botanic Garden Project Quito
- Jardín Botánico Hacienda Verde Quito, Puéllaro, Pichincha Province
- Jardín Botánico Yachay, Yachay University, Urcuqui, Imbabura
- Jardín botánico La Carolina
- Botanical Garden Atocha-La Liria, Ambato, Tungurahua Province

== Herbarium collections ==
- The Mazan Ecological Foundation (Spanish: Fundación Ecológica Mazán) was granted the AZUA initials to its herbarium by Botanic Gardens Conservation International (BGCI).
