= Clodoveo Carrión Mora =

Ecuadorian scientist (1883–1957)

- Born: 1883; Loja, Ecuador
- Died: 1957 (aged 73–74)
- Education: University of London, University of Manchester
- Known for: Work contributed to understanding geological evolution.
- Parents: Manuel Alejandro Carrión Riofrío (father); Filomena Mora Bermeo (mother)
- Relatives: Hector Manuel (brother), José Miguel (brother), Benjamín Carrión (brother)
- Scientific career
- Fields: Paleontology, naturalist
- Institutions: Colegio Bernardo Valdivieso

Clodoveo Carrión Mora (1883 – 1957) was an Ecuadorian palaeontologist and naturalist.

== Early years ==
Clodoveo Carrión was born in 1883, in Loja, the second son of Manuel Alejandro Carrión Riofrío (Poet) and Filomena Mora Bermeo. Among his brothers are Hector Manuel (Poet), José Miguel (lawyer, sociologist, senator, rector of the Universidad Nacional de Loja) and Benjamín Carrión.

Clodoveo attended a Catholic primary school La Salle and then a secular high school Colegio Bernardo Valdivieso. As a young man he recognised that he had no aptitude for the letters ---something rare in his family--- but rather for the natural sciences. To pursue his scientific education, Clodoveo travelled to Europe. He studied at the University of London and at the University of Manchester obtaining the title of Industrial Engineer. During his 10-year stay in Europe he also carried out many studies in Spain and France. He never married and was a very reserved person. Having been born into an affluent family of intellectuals and liberals certainly contributed to achieving his plans.

== Return from Europe ==
Upon returning from Europe, he became Professor of Natural Sciences at the Colegio Bernardo Valdivieso until his retirement. In 1924, he presented some of his findings to the Panamerican Scientific Congress in Lima, for which he was widely praised. He kept a longtime correspondence and working relationship with distinguished scientists of several renowned international institutions, e.g. with the American palaeontologist Edward W. Berry of the Johns Hopkins University, Baltimore; with the British geologist Errol I. White of the British Museum in London; with Orestes Cendrero of the Instituto General y Técnico de Santander, Spain, and Waldo L. Schmitt of the American Museum of Natural History. For all his teaching and scientific achievements he obtained the degree of Doctor Honoris causa from the Universidad Nacional de Loja.

== Scientific contributions ==
Carrión was very active in paleontology and entomology, fields in which he discovered many species and one genus. His main discoveries were:

- Plants: Elaphoglossum carrioni, Melochia carrioni, and Caussapea carrioni.
- Other paleo-species that he classified belonged to the following groups: Spotfungi , Bryophyta, Pteridophyta, Monocotyledonae, Dicotyledonae, Urticales, Santalales, Chenopodiales, Ranales, Rosales, Geraniales, Sapindales, Rivimnales, Malvales, Laurales, Myrtales, Ebenales, Gentianales, Rubiales.

These findings were thoroughly described by White (1927) and Berry (1929). Such transcendental discoveries were crucial to understanding the last phase of the geological evolution of the Andes by correlating several sedimentary basins in the American Continent.

In zoology his main findings were:

- Fish: Carrionellus diomortus and Lipopterichthys carrioni.
- Reptiles: Atractus carrioni Parker, 1930; Bothrops lojanus Parker, 1930; Stenocercus carrioni Parker, 1934.
- Arthropods: Triatoma carrioni (usually called in Spanish chinche de caballo); which is the vector of the Chagas Disease in Southern Ecuador. This finding was documented by F. Larrousse (1926).
- Frogs: Eleutherodactylus carrioni, Hyla carrioni, Gastrotheca marsupiata lojana. The latter is a frog with the peculiarity that during reproduction she incubates her eggs in a special bag that is carried on her back. His findings were thoroughly reported by Parker (1930, 1932, 1934, 1938).
- Coleoptera: many beetles belonging to the families Cerambycidae, Scarabaeidae, Meloidae, Elateridae, and Tenebrionidae.

The beetles that Clodoveo contributed were saved by his nephew Jorge Castillo Carrión, in Loja, Ecuador.
