= Martínez-Holguín House Museum =

Coordinates: 1°13′40″S 78°37′18″W

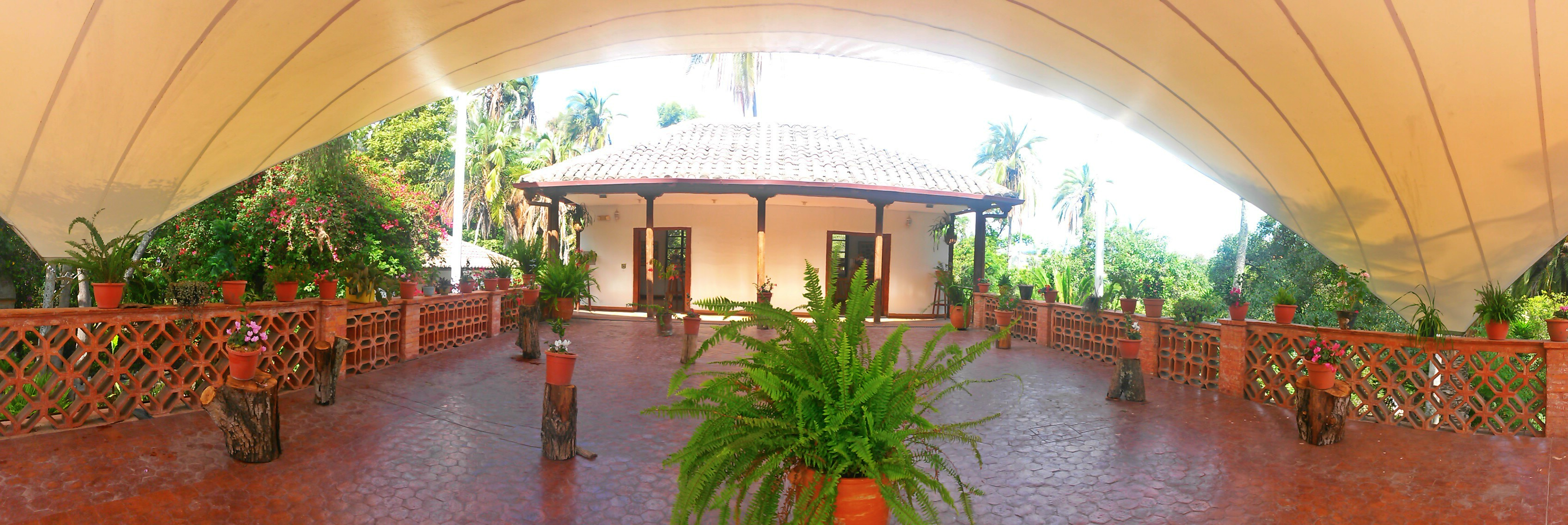
Museum Martínez-Holguín

Martínez-Holguín House (Spanish: Casa Museo Martínez-Holguín) is a historic house museum in Atocha parish, in the northern suburbs of Ambato, Ambato Canton, Tungurahua Province, Ecuador. It is situated in the Botanical Garden Atocha-La Liria, and dates to 1865, when it was built by Dr. Nicolás Martínez Vasconez. Since then, it has been the residence of several notable figures, including Luis A. Martínez, the author of the novel A la Costa and Minister of State and Education, who established the Colegio Normal de Agricultura in Ambato, and scientist Augusto Nicolás Martínez. It has since been converted into a wax museum.

== Gallery ==
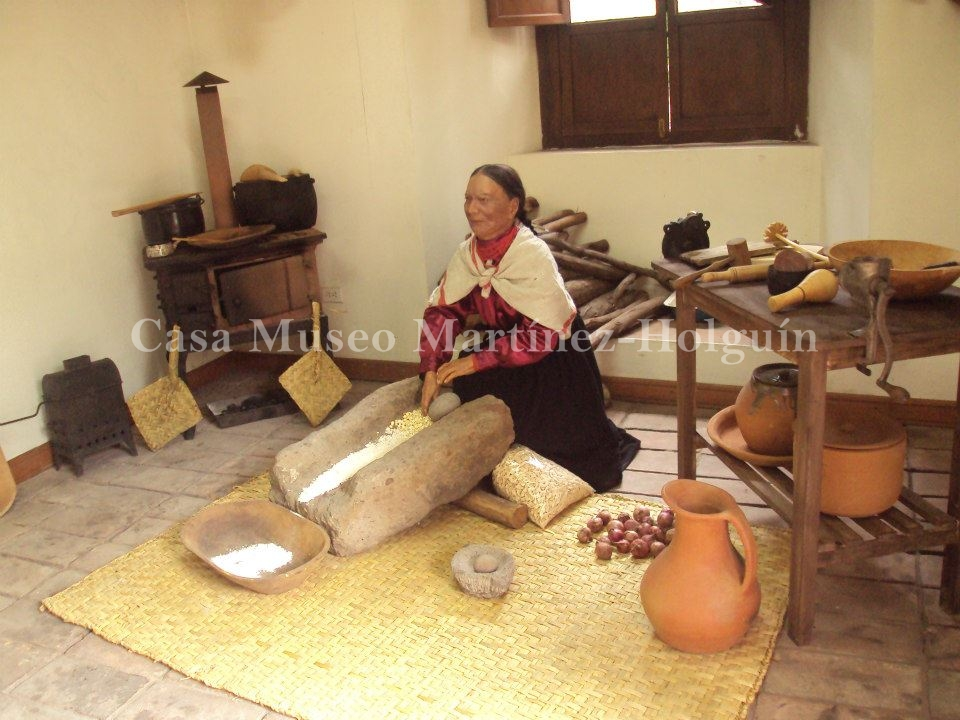
A museum exhibit

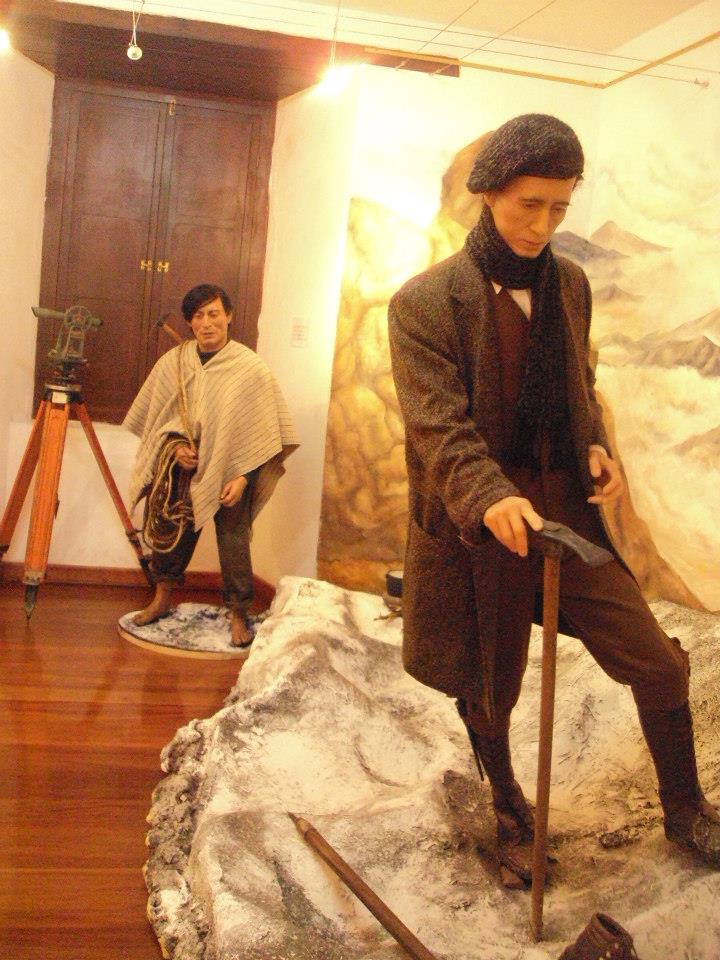
An exhibit
