= Chachoan Airport =

Airport in Tungurahua Province, Ecuador

- IATA: ATF; ICAO: SEAM

Summary
- Airport type: Public / Military
- Serves: Ambato, Ecuador
- Elevation AMSL: 8,502 ft (2,591 m)
- Coordinates: 01°12′45″S 78°34′28″W

Map
- Location of the airport in Ecuador

Runways
Direction	Length		Surface
Direction	m	ft	Surface
01/19	1,920	6,299	Asphalt
- Source: WAD GCM Google Maps

Chachoan Airport (Spanish: Aeropuerto Chachoan) (IATA: ATF, ICAO: SEAM) is a high elevation airport serving Ambato (also known as San Juan de Ambato), capital of the Tungurahua Province in Ecuador. The airport is 6 kilometres (3.7 mi) northeast of Ambato, in a broad basin of the central Andes mountains cut through by the Ambato River.

The Ambato VOR-DME (Ident: AMV) is located on a ridge 4.7 nautical miles (8.7 km) south-southeast of the airport. The Ambato non-directional beacon (Ident: AMB) is located on the field. There is rising and mountainous terrain in all quadrants.

== Accident ==
On October 28, 1997, An Aerogal Fairchild FH-227D, with registration HC-BUF, was operating a repositioning ferry flight with staff and equipment from Quito's Mariscal Sucre International Airport to Chachoan. Due to the pilots' and the airline's poor-to-none flight preparation to fly into this high-elevation airfield, the plane touched down halfway down the runway at high speed (at 100 knots). It overran the runway by 170 meters and fell into a 90-meter-deep ravine. There were no casualties among the seven occupants but the plane was written off.

This particular airframe (cn.573 formerly N2784R) had been briefly used in 1992 for photoshoot purposes for the 1993 movie Alive, painted in the livery of the ill-fated Uruguayan Air Force 571. The photoshoot took place in Boeing Field, Seattle.

== See also ==
- Transport in Ecuador
- List of airports in Ecuador
