= Velastegui =

Velastegui is a Basque surname.

There are several etymological possibilities for this surname - either it comes from clumping belha z tegi words which means the place of grass hay - or it comes from the agglutination z bela words tegi which means the place of the crows; patronymic this precise location of the ancestral home.

Notable people with the surname include:

- Anita Velastegui (born 1952), Ecuadorean colonel
- David Velastegui (born 1991), Canadian professional soccer player
