= Augusto Nicolás Martínez =

- Born: 28 March 1860
- Died: 19 March 1946 (aged 85)
- Known for: Geology, Agronomy

Augusto Nicolás Martínez (March 28, 1860 – March 19, 1946) was an Ecuadorian agronomist, geologist, farmer, researcher, educator, and mountaineer.

== Biography ==
Martínez was the son of Nicolás Martínez Vásconez and Adelaida Holguín Naranjo

. He lived for a period in Martínez-Holguín House, in the northern outskirts of Ambato. His primary education was under Christian Brothers in Quito. In 1874, he studied geology and the following year he studied German language under Father Luis Dressel.

In 1880, Martinez conducted geological studies for a month in Antisana, and wrote a report of his findings in Guayaquil's La Nación. Two years later, he served in the Ecuadorian Army in Chambo/Quero cantons. He married Roxana Quirola Saá in April 1890. In the early 1890s, he found work as an assistant in the Astronomical Observatory of Quito, and later published Historia de la Ciencia Ecuatoriana (1896). He was appointed Director, Geology section, in the government of General Eloy Alfaro. He served again in the army in the liberal revolution of 1895 under General Francisco H. Moncayo, under whom he attained the rank of lieutenant colonel.

In the early 1900s, Martinez published a series of works, including Vestigios del hombre cuaternario en la región interandina (1901), Algunas montañas volcánicas (1905), and El Profesor Hans Meyer en el Ecuador (1905). As rector, he taught at the Eugenio Espejo School in 1904. He served as acting Governor of Tungurahua in 1906, and in the same year, he was professor of natural science at Universidad Laica Vicente Rocafuerte. The following year, Martinez settled in Ambato and accepted the Chemistry Chair, a position he held until 1927; he also served as rector till 1910. Fluent in English, French and German as well as his native Spanish, he was corresponding member of the National Academy of History, the Deutsche Gesellschaft für Geowissenschaften and Société astronomique de France. He translated several works into Spanish. He was awarded by the French Academy of Sciences for his work in 1920. The Colegio Augusto Nicolás Martínez in Ambato, established on 29 December 1994, is named in his honor.

After retirement, he lived with his son Carlos. He died in Ambato of cardiac failure on 19 March 1946.
