= Quisapincha =

Coordinates: 1°14′4″S 78°41′4″W

Quisapincha is a town in Ecuador, located in the province of Tungurahua in the Ambato Canton. It lies about 12 km west of the city of Ambato, high upon the mountainside of Cerro Casigana. From Quisapincha, there are excellent views of the Andes, including the smoking Tungurahua volcano and the valley in which Ambato sits.

The town has once been the center of Kisapincha resistance against Spanish and Creole intruders. Many of the Kisapincha now live in the high altitude communities that form Quisapincha Alto, part of the parroquia of Quisapincha. The only footpaths connecting Quisapincha Alto with larger cities were constantly watched and could be easily blocked by the defenders. Locals remember that "until 1975 no white man could enter Quisapincha Alto. It was impossible." The parroquia of Quisapincha once had infant mortality of 547 deaths per 1000 births, and the communities of Quisapincha Alto are now growing at 6.3% per annum. During the 1992 uprising the indigenous people of Quisapincha Alto reappropriated the land from the church and gained some Kisapincha representation in local politics. Their rule faces continuing opposition from mestizo townspeople.

Quisapincha is famous for its leather products. Almost 70% of the town's workforce is involved in the leather trade. Leather goods include shoes, jackets, wallets, hats, and gloves. The town also lies close to Parque de la Familia (Family Park), a provincial park dedicated to family activities. The park features sports facilities, a picnic area, and even an eco-walk.
