= Chaetostoma carrioni =

Conservation status
- Data Deficient (IUCN 3.1)

Scientific classification
- Kingdom: Animalia
- Phylum: Chordata
- Class: Actinopterygii
- Order: Siluriformes
- Family: Loricariidae
- Genus: Chaetostoma
- Species: C. carrioni

Binomial name
- Chaetostoma carrioni (Norman, 1935)

Synonyms
- Lipopterichthys carrioni Norman, 1935

Species of fish

Chaetostoma carrioni is a species of freshwater ray-finned fish belonging to the family Loricariidae, the suckermouth armoured catfishes, and the subfamily Hypostominae, the suckermouth catfishes. This catfish is endemic to Ecuador where was described from the Zamora River near Loja in the, upper Amazon basin. This species reaches a standard length of 7.8 cm (3.1 in). The specific name, carrioni, honours the Ecuadorean paleontologist and naturalist Clodoveo Carrión, the collector of the holotype which he gave to the British Museum (Natural History). There is very little information about the population size, distribution and biology of this catfish, leading the International Union for Conservation of Nature to classify it as Data Deficient.
