= Colegio Bernardo Valdivieso =

One of the oldest secondary schools in Ecuador

- Unidad Educativa Bernardo Valdivieso

Location
- Loja, Loja Province; Ecuador
- Coordinates: 4°00′38″S 79°11′56″W

Information
- Type: Public secondary school
- Established: 1727 (Note: Earliest antecedent was the Jesuit-run Colegio de Loja (1727); teaching ceased after the 1767 expulsion of the Jesuits, and nineteenth-century initiatives led to the later re-establishment that took the name Bernardo Valdivieso.)
- Campus: Urban

Colegio Bernardo Valdivieso is a historic public secondary school in Loja, Ecuador. Press and scholarly accounts trace its antecedents to a Jesuit school created in 1727, interrupted by the 1767 expulsion of the Society of Jesus, and reorganized during the nineteenth century; it is therefore regarded as one of the oldest secondary schools in Ecuador.

== History ==
Educational activity in Loja is documented for the early eighteenth century. In 1727 the Jesuits established the Colegio de Loja; the school operated for roughly four decades until the order's expulsion in 1767, which led to closure of Jesuit institutions across the Spanish Empire.

During the nineteenth century, local efforts to restore secondary education gained momentum. Lojano philanthropist Bernardo Valdivieso (1745–1805) earmarked assets to sustain schooling in the city; the present school later adopted his name in recognition of that bequest. Accounts of Loja's civic and cultural life note mid-century initiatives such as the Colegio La Unión (organized in 1857), which form part of the lineage leading to today's institution.

A local monograph compiles archival material on the school's evolution and its links with the subsequent creation (1859) of the National University of Loja.

== Campus and status ==
The school occupies an urban site in central Loja and is recognized locally as an emblematic public institution; its facilities were renewed within Ecuador's Unidades Educativas del Milenio program in the 2010s.

== Legacy ==
The school features prominently in Loja's educational historiography for its long continuity and contribution to the city's intellectual life since colonial times.
