= Loja Canton =

Coordinates: 3°59′S 79°12′W

- Canton
- Location of Loja Province in Ecuador

- Loja Canton in Loja Province
- Country: Ecuador
- Province: Loja

Area
  - Total: 1,891 km^{2} (730 sq mi)

Population (2022 census)
  - Total: 250,028
  - Density: 132.2/km^{2} (342.4/sq mi)

The following article is about the Loja Canton. For the Loja Province, see Loja Province and for the city, see Loja, Ecuador.

Loja Canton is located in the southeast of the Province of Loja bordering the Podocarpus National Park and the Province of Zamora-Chinchipe in the east and south, and the cantons of Saraguro in the north, Catamayo, Gonzanama, and Quilanga in the west. The principal city is Loja which is also the provincial capital. It is also home to Vilcabamba, the "Valley of Longevity."

== Demographics ==
Ethnic groups as of the Ecuadorian census of 2010:

- Mestizo 90.2%
- White 3.5%
- Indigenous 2.6%
- Afro-Ecuadorian 2.5%
- Montubio 1.1%
- Other 0.1%

== Sights ==
- City of Loja
- National Shrine of Our Lady of El Cisne.
- Reynaldo Espinoza Botanical Gardens (one of the world's highest-altitude botanical gardens, at 2100m)
- The Incan ruins of de Ciudadela, Quinara, Taranza, and Llano Grande.

== Traditional celebrations ==
- Border Integration Fair, September 8
- Province Day, September 18
- Independence of Loja, November 18
- Founding of Loja, December 8
