= El Cisne =

- Location within Ecuador
- Coordinates: 3°51′4.46″S 79°25′31.14″W
- Country: Ecuador
- Province: Loja
- Canton: Loja
- Elevation: 2,440 m (8,010 ft)

Population
  - Total: 1,532
- Time zone: UTC-5 (NAET)
- Climate: Cwb

El Cisne is a city in the southern region of Ecuador, in Loja province, about 74 km (46 mi) from the city of Loja.

The city is known for the much venerated Marian National Shrine of Our Lady of El Cisne.

== History ==
The inhabitants of El Cisne region had wanted their own virgin Mary shrine similar to the Virgin of Guadalupe in Mexico City. Representatives of the city in 1594 requested sculptor Don Diego de Robles to build the Virgin de El Cisne statue which he made from the wood of a cedar tree. Each year on August 17 thousands of pilgrims gather in El Cisne to carry the Virgin Mary statue in a religious procession to the cathedral of Loja where it is the focus of a great festival on September 8 and is later returned to El Cisne.

== Image gallery ==
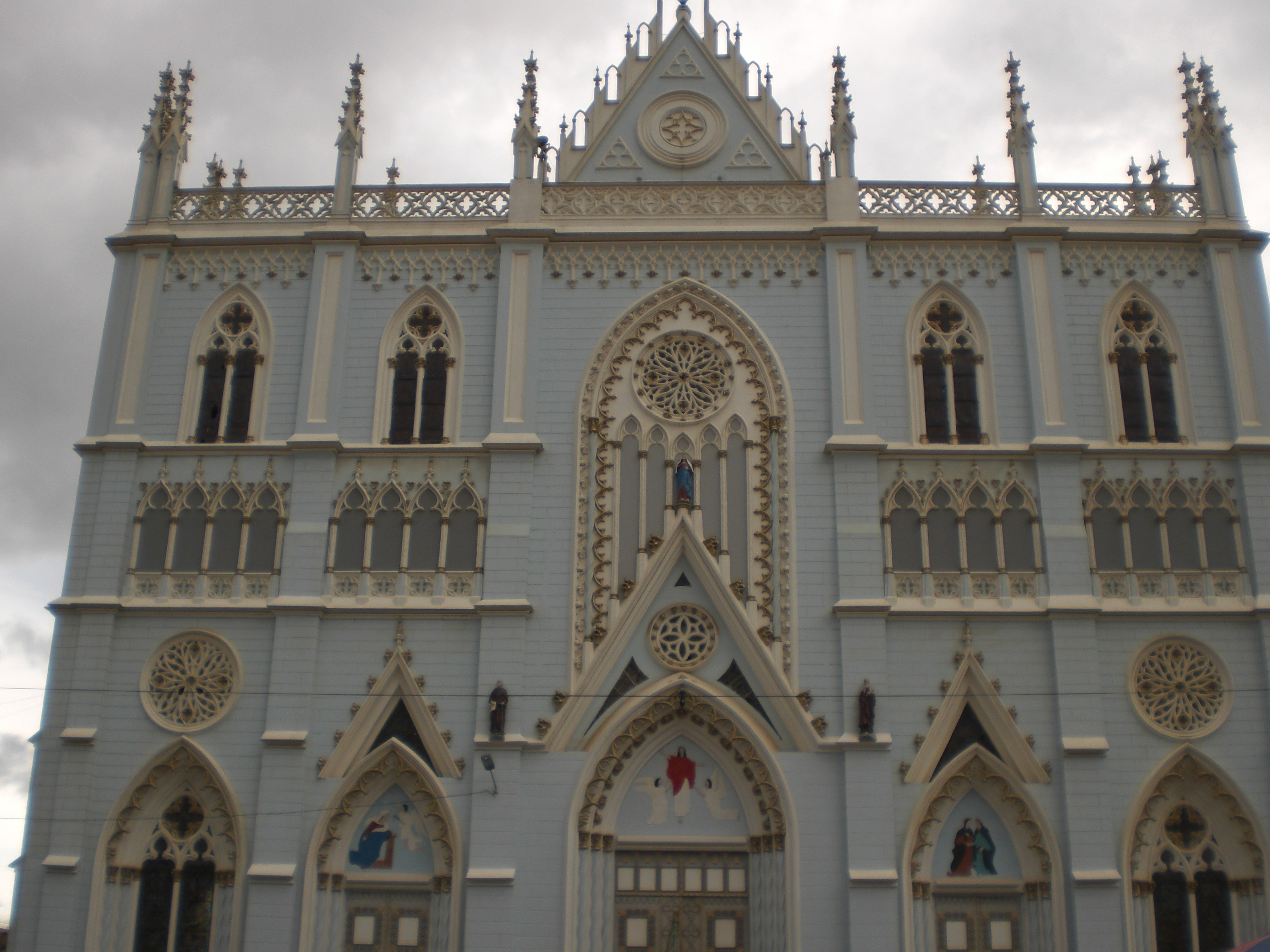
Marian National Shrine of Our Lady of El Cisne

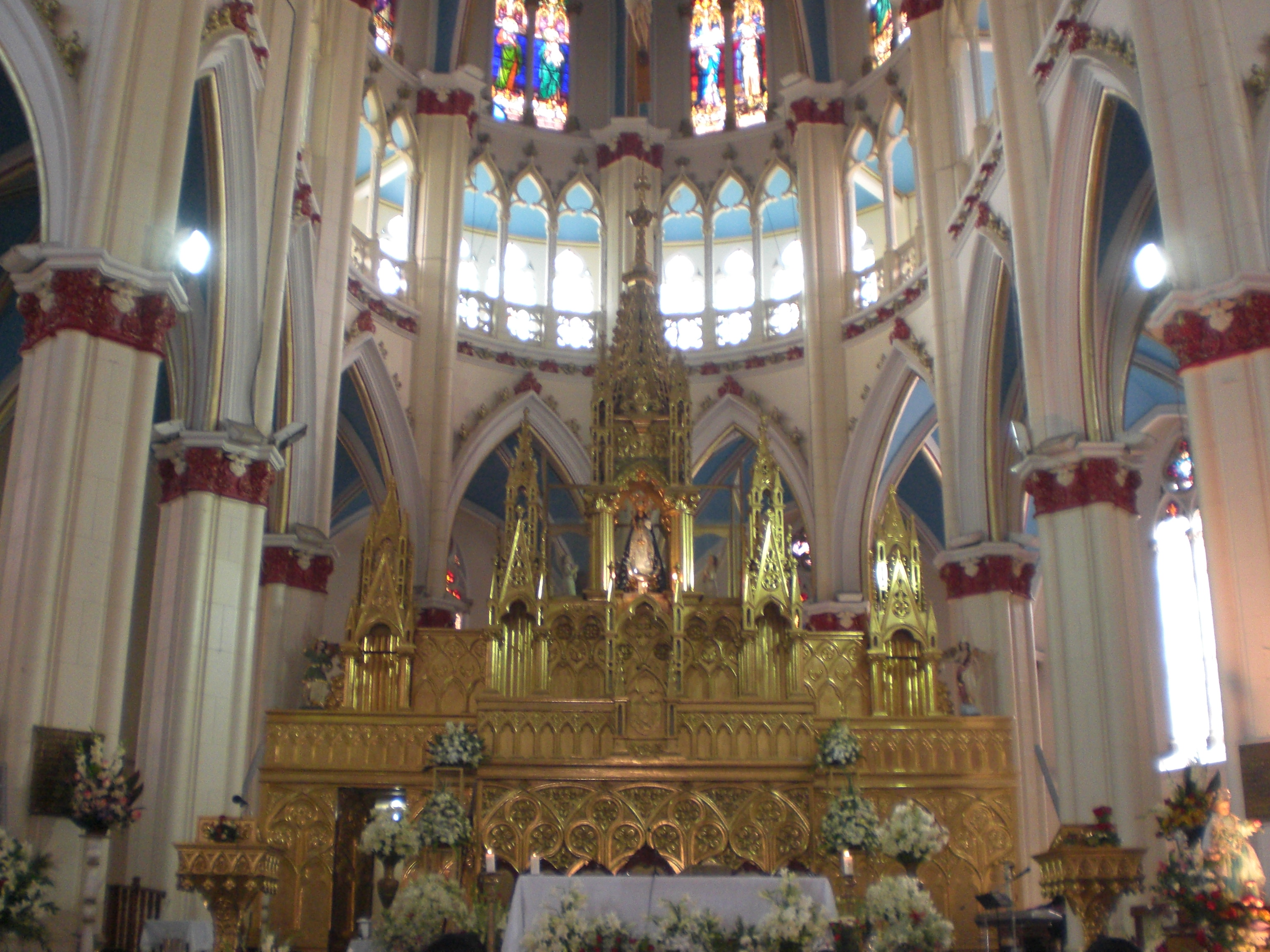
Altar of the Marian National Shrine of Our Lady of El Cisne with the icon of the virgin in the center.
