= Ambato River (Ecuador) =

River in Ecuador

Coordinates: 1.24264°S 78.58167°W

Location
- Country: Ecuador

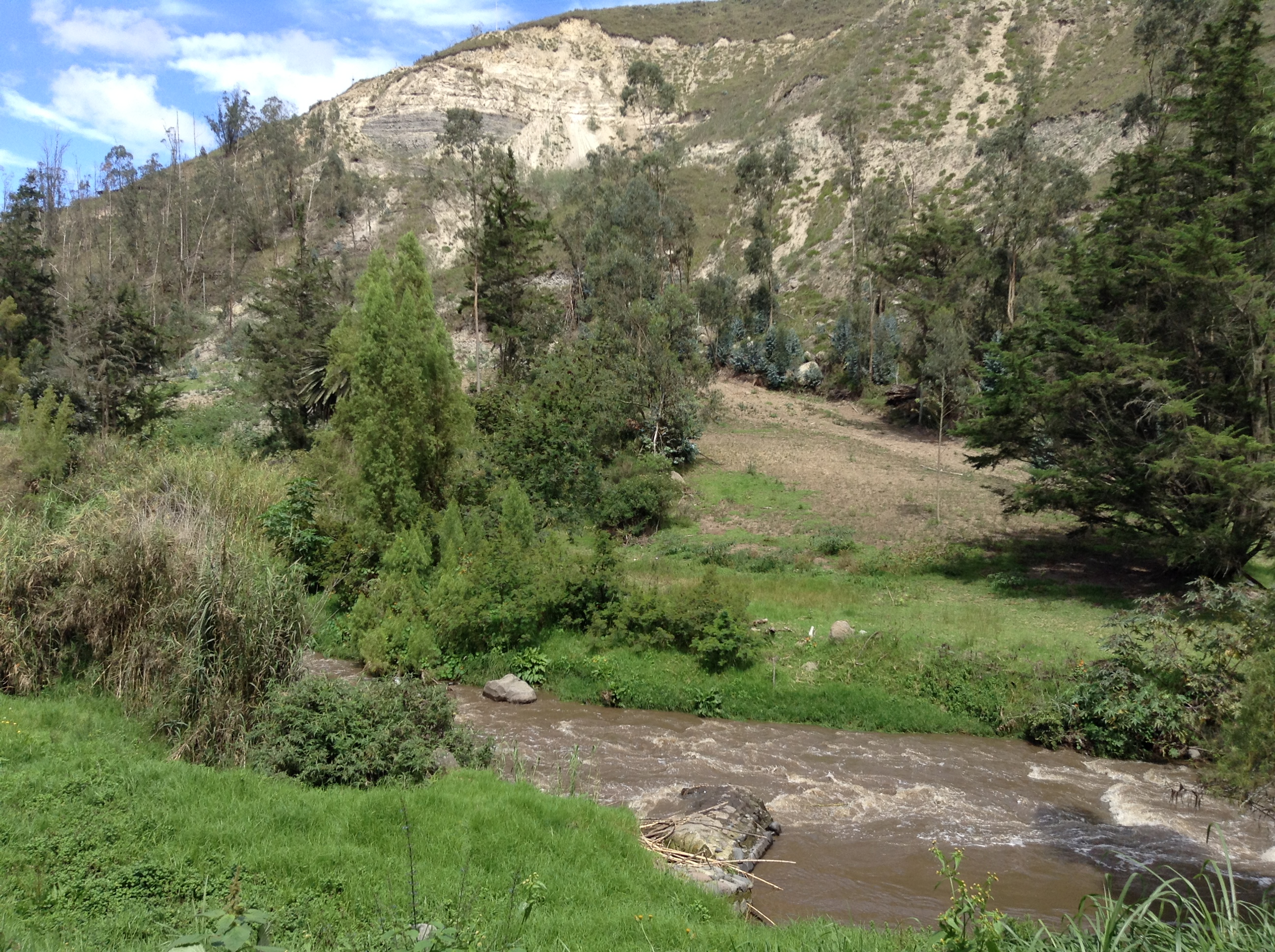

The Ambato River is a river of Ecuador. It flows near the city of Ambato. It empties into the Pastaza River, and ultimately via the Amazon into the Atlantic Ocean.

== See also ==
- List of rivers of Ecuador
