= Ecua-volley =

Type of Volleyball played in Ecuador

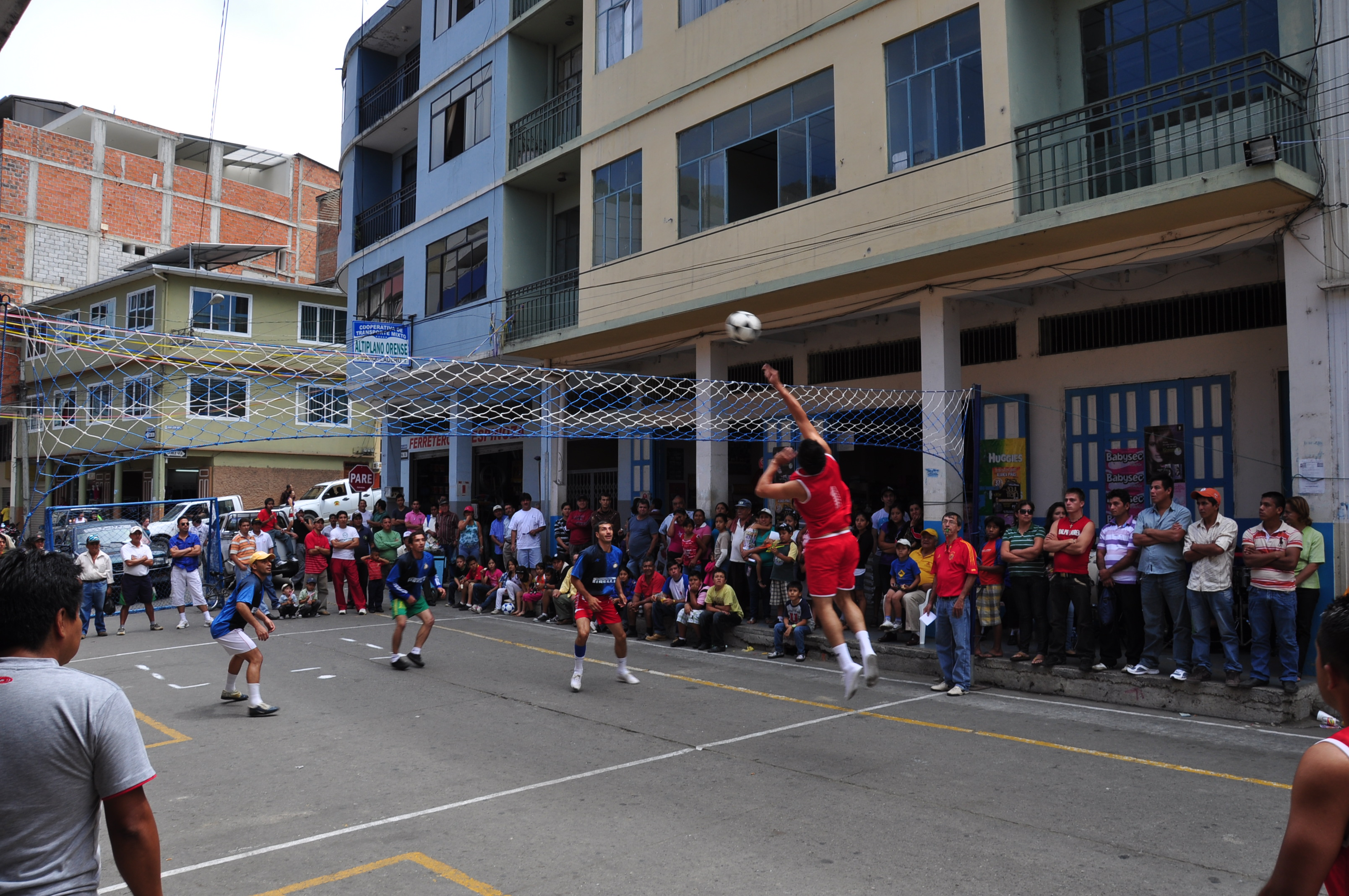
- An ecua-volley game in Piñas, Ecuador
- Highest governing body: FEDENALIGAS
- Nicknames: Boly
- First played: unknown

Characteristics
- Team members: 3 player
- Mixed-sex: team,
- Type: Indoor, Outdoor, Beach
- Equipment: mikasa ft-5 football

Presence
- Olympic: no

Ecua-volley is a variant of volleyball invented and played in Ecuador. Its official name is Ecuavoley, however it can be informally called ecuavolley, ecuavoly, ecuabol, or simply boly. Its popularity has also spread to Colombia, the United States, and Europe.

== History ==
The beginning of this variant volleyball game needs to be clarified. It is believed that some type of game similar to this already existed prior to European contact. While it is adherent that volleyball was invented in 1895, and the first world tournaments were held 1949, organized tournaments of ecuavolley were held in 2000, suggesting it could not have spread throughout the world that quickly, which would mean that the national volley game was developed independently and had a convergent evolution. Ecuavoley tournaments in neighborhoods were held by different organization since 1944.

== Rules of the game ==
The setup of the game is similar to volleyball, with a few key differences:

- Each team is made up of three players: the setter (Spanish: colocador), the flyer (volador), and the server (servidor).
- The net is higher and tighter: 2.80 meters high and 60 centimeters wide.
- The court is made of cement and has the same dimensions: 18 meters long and 9 meters wide
- The game is played with a mikasa ft-5 football.
- Games consist of two sets of 15 points. If both teams agree, they can alternatively play two sets of points with the option of a third tie-breaking set.
- The ball can be held each time it is received, as long as the holding lasts less than one second.

== Gameplay ==
The flyer plays behind the setter and server, and runs quickly from one side to another recovering balls. Usually the flyer recovers the ball for the server. The server sets the ball in the air so the setter can pass the ball over the net. The setter places the ball on the opposite court in a strategic manner, in an attempt to deceive the other team of where it will land. The referee is called the judge.
