= National University of Loja =

Public university in Loja

- Universidad Nacional de Loja
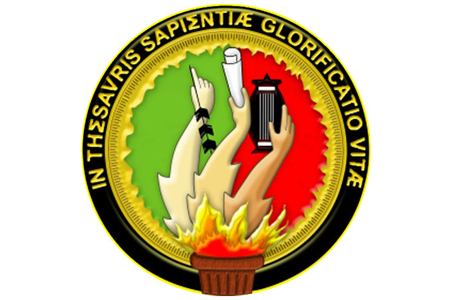
- Seal of the National University of Loja
- Motto: In thesauris sapientiae glorificatio vitae
- Motto in English: In the treasures of wisdom, there is the glorification of life
- Type: Public
- Established: December 31, 1859; 166 years ago
- Founders: Manuel Carrión Pinzano
- Affiliations: PRME (UN)
- Vice-Chancellor: Elvia Maricela Zhapa Amay
- Rector: Nikolay Aguirre Mendoza
- Students: 16,817 (2024)
- Location: Av. Pío Jaramillo Alvarado y Reinaldo Espinosa, Loja, Ecuador
- Campus: Ciudad Universitaria Guillermo Falconí Espinosa
- Website: unl.edu.ec

The National University of Loja (Spanish: Universidad Nacional de Loja) is a public university in Loja, southern Ecuador. University-level teaching in the city dates to 1859, when the Federal Government of Loja, led by Manuel Carrión Pinzano, ordered higher studies to be offered under the auspices of the then Colegio San Bernardo; in practice, Jurisprudence was the first effective chair. The university is considered one of the country's oldest institutions of higher education.

== History ==
In 1859, during the Federal Government of Loja headed by Manuel Carrión Pinzano, a decree provided for higher studies (jurisprudence, philosophy and letters, theology, and medicine) to be attached to Colegio San Bernardo; Jurisprudence effectively began to be taught that year, marking the start of higher education in Loja.

On 26 December 1895, Supreme Chief Eloy Alfaro issued a decree creating the faculty of jurisprudence in Loja, attached to Colegio San Bernardo, and authorizing it to confer academic degrees in law—consolidating the city's university tradition.

By executive decree published in the Registro Oficial No. 948 (27 October 1943), the existing university board in Loja was elevated to the category of university, enabling the new National University of Loja to confer academic degrees.

== Organization ==
UNL operates as a public, secular university under Ecuadorian higher education law and maintains its main campus at the Ciudad Universitaria Guillermo Falconí Espinosa in Loja. Official planning and accountability instruments describe its academic structure and programs (primary sources for current data).
