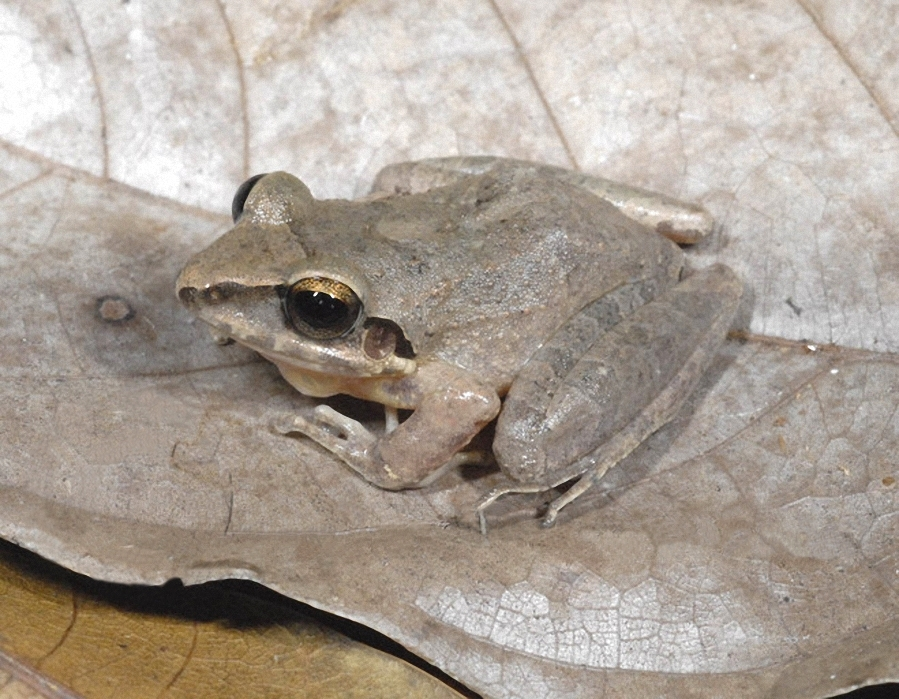

Conservation status
- Least Concern (IUCN 3.1)

Scientific classification
- Kingdom: Animalia
- Phylum: Chordata
- Class: Amphibia
- Order: Anura
- Clade: Brachycephaloidea
- Family: Craugastoridae
- Genus: Pristimantis
- Species: P. lymani

Binomial name
- Pristimantis lymani (Barbour & Noble, 1920)

Synonyms
- Eleutherodactylus lymani Barbour and Noble, 1920; Eleutherodactylus carrioni Parker, 1932

= Pristimantis lymani =

Species of frog

Pristimantis lymani, also known as Lyman's robber frog, is a species of frog in the family Strabomantidae. It is found in southern Ecuador and northern Peru. Its natural habitats are montane forests, sub-páramo, and páramo. These common frogs have been found under stones by streams as well as in large bromeliads on rocky slopes and cliffs. While common and having a stable population trend, it is suffering from habitat loss.
