= Orestes Cendrero =

Spanish scientist

Orestes Cendrero was a Spanish naturalist and professor of biology at Instituto Nacional de Segunda Enseñanza in Santander. He was a colombophilia researcher, (studied pigeons), and was editor of the pigeon scientific journal: Boletín Colombófilo Español.

== Bibliography ==
- Lecciones de Historia Natural acomodadas al cuestionario oficial. Santander.s.e. Cendrero * Curso cíclico de ciencias físico-naturales (primer año). Cendrero Curiel, Orestes. Santander.s.e. .1935.2ª ed.Un vol. 8º.182 pág+125 fig.
- Nociones de Historia Natural. Cendrero Curiel, Orestes. Santander.J. Martínez .1917.1ª ed.Un Curiel, Orestes.1929.2ª ed.Un vol. 4º.201.

vol. 4º.288.

- Curso elemental de historia natural: botánica . Cendrero Curiel, Orestes. Buenos Aires: López. 1961. AR. 10a ed. Botánica. Filosofía vegetal. Taxonomía vegetal. Anatomía vegetal.
- Nociones de historía natural. Orestes Cendrero Curiel. Tercera edición corregida y aumentada. Media piel nueva. Imprenta y encuadernacion de Antonio Andrey y cia. Año 1922. 333pag
