= Anita Velasteguí =

Anita Priscela Velasteguí Ramos
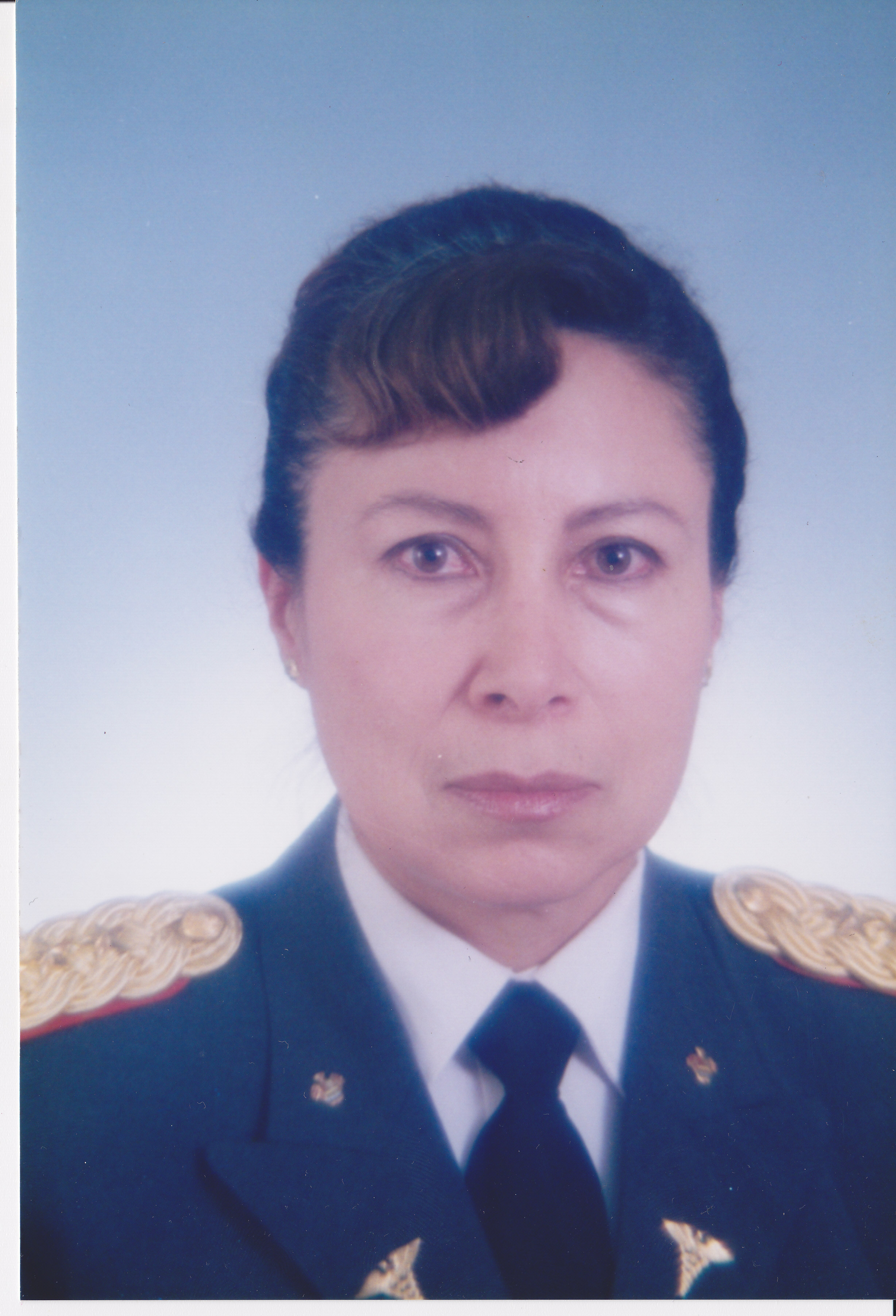
- Dr. Col. EMS. Anita Priscela Velasteguí Ramos
- Born: 26 July 1942; Ambato, Ecuador
- Allegiance: Ecuador
- Branch: Ecuadorian Army
- Service years: 1974-1999
- Rank: Colonel

Anita Priscela Velasteguí Ramos (born July 26, 1942, in Ambato) was one of the first female officers to have reached the military rank of colonel in the Ecuadorian Army.

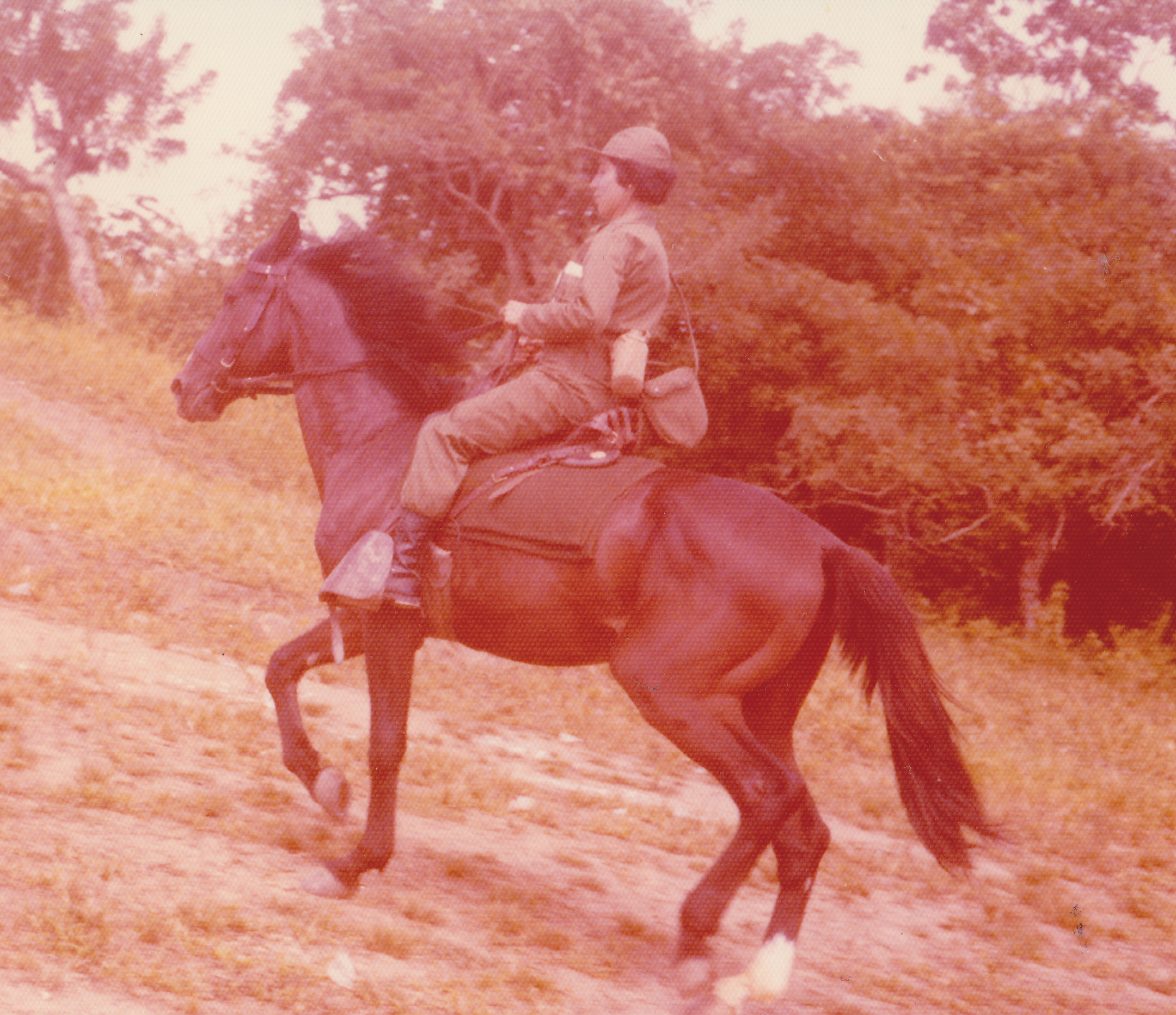
Anita's early years as an Officer

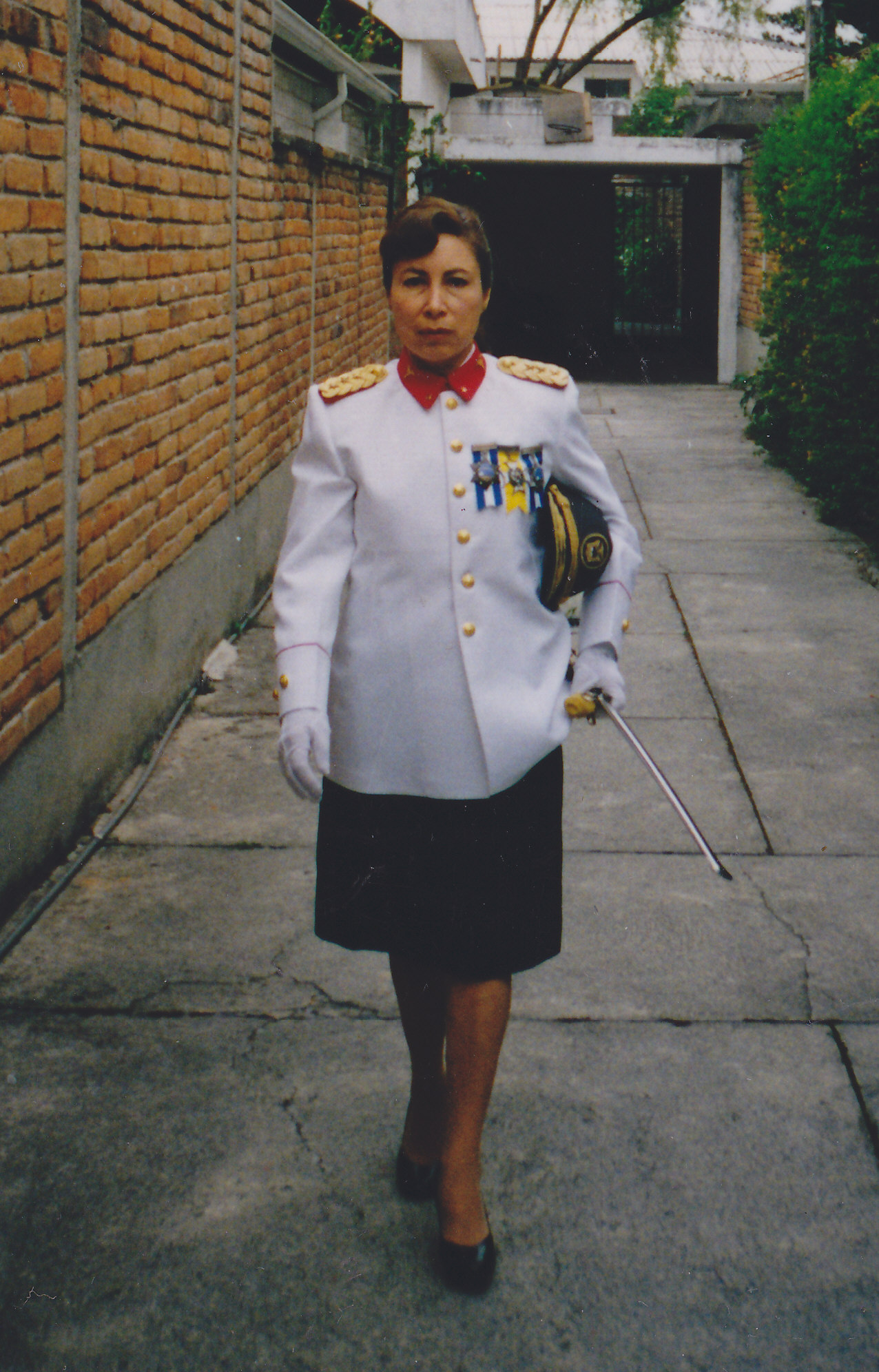
Anita in formal uniform

== Early years ==
Anita Velasteguí was born into a family of agricultural producers and distributors in Ambato, where she grew up together with three brothers and one sister. She attended primary school at the “Cevallos” Primary School and Middle and High school at the “Colegio Nacional Ambato” all-girls school where she completed her secondary education. Influenced by her father she took up the field of dentistry and studied in Ecuador's largest National University, the Central University of Ecuador in Quito. In 1974 Anita applied to the Ecuadorian Army, in response to a recruitment advertisement as the army was in search of graduates of several career fields of the health services branch.

== Army career ==
She started her career as a first lieutenant and was initially posted in the southern city of Cuenca. She would later serve also in posts at El Oro province and in Cayambe, Pichincha province. Eventually she was assigned to the Armed Forces' National Hospital, where she served as a dentist for many years. Whilst in service at this hospital, she was promoted to captain, major and lieutenant colonel. After 20 years of service Anita was one of the first three female officers that were promoted to the rank of Colonel (the highest rank that a services branch officer could reach by the law of the day) in the Ecuadorian armed forces. Among the three she had the best overall grades. Shortly after her promotion she was appointed Director of the Health Services Department of the Ministry of Defense. She retired from this position after 25 years of service.

== Present day ==
After retirement, Anita has devoted herself to a lifelong passion: painting, and had attended many painting courses mostly through the Ecuadorian Cultural Institute (Casa de la Cultura Ecuatoriana). Over the years she has created a small painting collection with over 50 works which have been exhibited in different galleries. Anita lives in Quito, and has been married to Numa Pompilio Garcés Altamanirano for more than 30 years; they have three adult sons: David, Pablo and Miguel.
