= Ambato, Ecuador =

Ambato
- City
- San Juan de Ambato
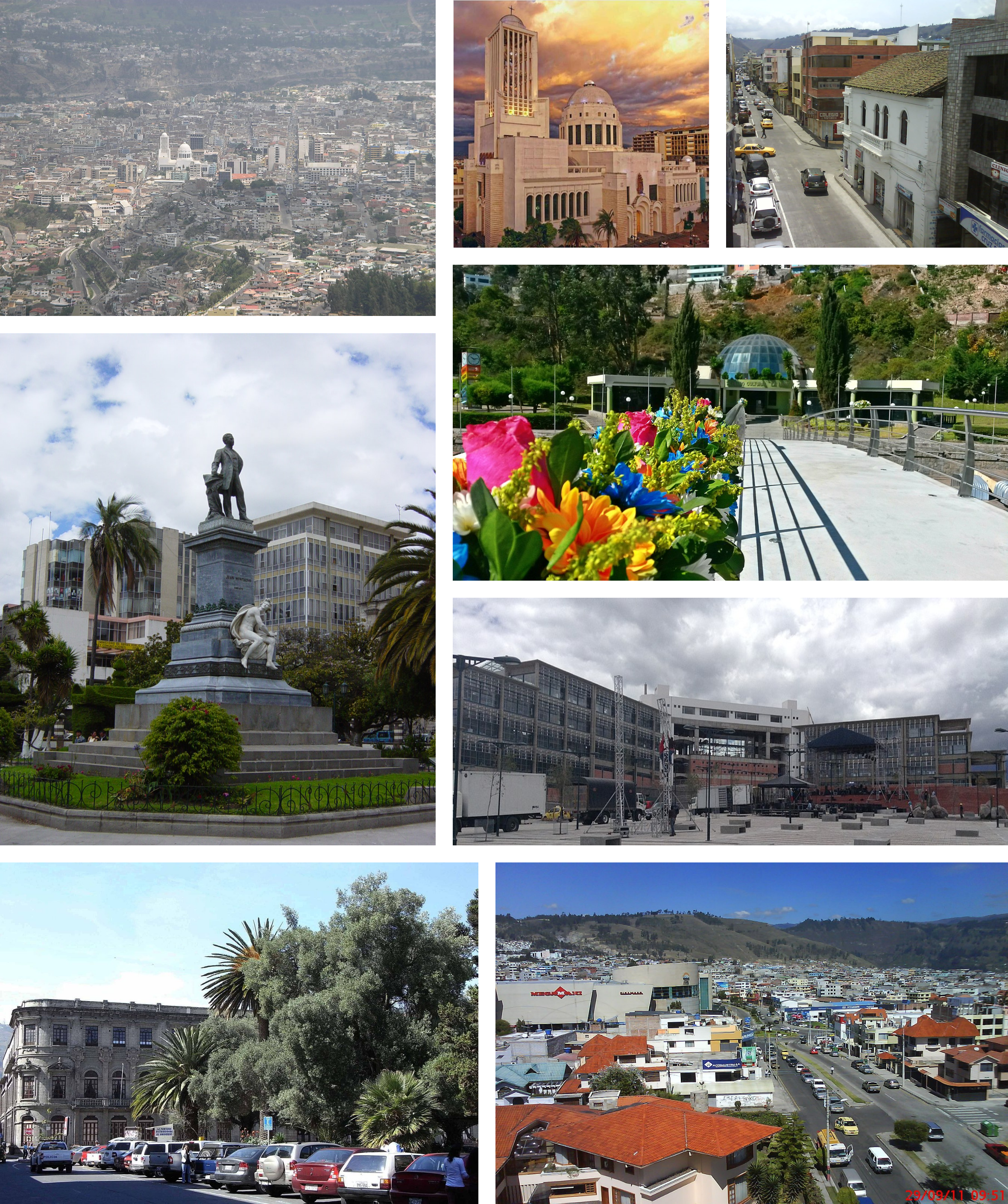
- From top, left to right: Panoramic view of the city, Cathedral Basilica of Our Lady of Elevation, Bolivar street, Atocha-La Liria Historical Botanical Garden, Juan Montalvo monument, City hall of Ambato, Cevallos Park and Victor Hugo avenue.

- Flag
- Nickname: Spanish: Tierra de las Flores y las Frutas (Land of Flowers and Fruits)
- Motto: Tierrita linda
- Location within Ecuador
- Coordinates: 1°14′32″S 78°37′44″W
- Country: Ecuador
- Province: Tungurahua
- Canton: Ambato Canton
- Founded: December 6, 1698

Government
  - Mayor: Diana Caiza

Area
  - City: 34.64 km^{2} (13.37 sq mi)
- Elevation: 2,577 m (8,455 ft)
- Highest elevation: 3,900 m (12,800 ft)
- Lowest elevation: 1,800 m (5,900 ft)

Population (2022 census)
  - City: 177,316
  - Density: 5,119/km^{2} (13,260/sq mi)
- Demonyms: Ambateño,-a
- Time zone: UTC-5 (ECT)
- Area code: (+593) 3
- Climate: Cfb
- Website: www.ambato.gob.ec (in Spanish)

Ambato (Spanish pronunciation: [amˈbato]; full form, San Juan de Ambato; Quechua: Ampatu Llaqta) is a city located in the central Andean valley of Ecuador. Lying on the banks of the Ambato River, the city also sits beneath several tall mountains. It is the capital city of the Tungurahua Province, situated at an elevation of 2,577 meters above sea level. It is variously nicknamed "City of Flowers and Fruits", "Land of the Three Juans", and "Garden of Ecuador." Ambato's inhabitants are called Ambateños or Guaytambos (after a type of native peach that the valley is famous for producing). The current mayor of Ambato is Diana Caiza.

The city has been fully or partially destroyed by earthquakes several times in its history, most recently on August 5, 1949, when the city and its cathedral were almost completely devastated. The city was rebuilt in the following two years. In honour of the tenacity of their residents, Ambato celebrates "The Festival of Fruits and Flowers" during Carnival in February. Today, the Festival of Fruits and Flowers is one of the most important festivities in Ecuador.

The city is referred to as "Land of the Three Juans" as it was the birthplace of three notable Ecuadorians: Juan Montalvo, a noted essay writer of the 19th century, Juan León Mera, the author of the country's national anthem, and Juan Benigno Vela, a key figure in the Ecuadorian independence movement. The city is well known for its production of fruit, tanneries, food products and textiles. It also serves as a major transportation hub, especially for travelers moving south on the Pan-American Highway.

== History ==
The city of Ambato was founded in its present location on December 6, 1698, as the Seat of Ambato, on the request of Ambateños to the Royal Audience of Quito. Prior to its founding, on June 20, the former Ambato settlement was destroyed by an earthquake and landslide which killed thousands. The settlement was relocated to higher ground at its present location. For the next century, Ambato grew slowly into an important mountain center. The city was to play a pivotal role in the Ecuadorian War of Independence. On October 9, 1820, the citizens of Guayaquil, along with help from a number of Venezuelans and Colombians, declared independence from the Spanish monarchy. The group raised an army (known as the Junta de Guayaquil), and began to move against Spanish forces in Quito. On their way to Quito, Ambato was one of the first cities to be liberated. The city formally declared its separation from Spain on November 12, 1820.

After liberating Ambato, the Junta de Guayaquil then turned their attention to Quito. Under the command of Colonel Luis Urdaneta, the army had liberated most of the central highland region, but Quito and the northern highland region were still under the authority of the Royal Audience. Field-Marshal Melchor Aymerich, acting President and commander of the Royalist army took swift action and ordered forces to march on the Urdaneta's army stationed in Ambato. Urdaneta's army met the Royalists, led by Colonel Francisco Gonzaelz at the First Battle of Huachi just outside Ambato on November 22, 1820, and were soundly defeated. Urdeneta retreated and Gonzalez entered Ambato.

A year later, the reformed patriots, under Antonio José de Sucre, left their position in Babahoyo to retake the highlands. In September 1821, the forces left the city, marching to reconquer Guaranda. On September 12, 1821, Sucre met the same fate as Urdeneta in the Second Battle of Huachi. Aymerich's forces defeated Sucre in the same plains that now form the neighborhood of Huachi, just southeast of downtown Ambato. Sucre returned to Guayaquil once more.

In 1822, the tide began to turn for Ambato and the rest of the towns in the central mountains. After two attempts to take the highlands, Sucre and the revolutionaries had built a network of spies and a dedicated spirit of liberation. They had also had some luck; in 1821, the Spanish monarch, Fernando VII had sent his own commander, General Mourgeon to lead the royalist defense in Quito. Mourgeon arrived in November only to fall terminally ill in the spring of 1822. At the same time, Sucre was marching his army south to Macará to meet up with Peruvian forces sent by General José de San Martín. From Loja they moved north retaking Riobamba in April. Ambato was retaken soon after and the royalists were soon defeated at the Battle of Pichincha.

During the early years of the Republic of Ecuador, the city served as an important cultural and economic center. Several times, Ambato served as the setting for rewriting of constitutions and continued to produce excellent artists and thinkers like Montalvo and Mera.

On August 5, 1949, the city was struck by a devastating earthquake. It is estimated that more than 6,000 people died, and thousands more were left homeless and destitute by the disaster. Much of the city's colonial center was completely ruined, including the cathedral that many considered on par with Cuenca's Iglesia de El Sagrario. The city was rebuilt with significant help from international aid organizations and the Ecuadorian government. The new modernist cathedral was inaugurated on December 12, 1954.

== Geography ==
Chimborazo and Carihuairazo seen from the outskirts of Ambato

Ambato lies in the main valley of the Central Cordillera, the highest of the Andean mountain ranges. The city itself is carved into the side of Cerro Casigana, the mountain that dominates the north end of the city. From Ambato, it is possible to see many snow-capped volcanoes including Cotopaxi, Tungurahua, Carihuairazo, and the largest mountain in Ecuador, Chimborazo. Tungurahua lies about 40 kilometers to the southeast. The threat of eruption from the volcano is constant. On May 16, 2006, Tungurahua erupted, covering the city with a thick layer of ash.

The Ambato River cuts through the north end of the city. It is not a very wide or deep river, but can cause significant flooding during periods of heavy rainfall. Throughout the years, the river has cut a deep basin into the land, creating the need for better bridges. In October 2008, the City of Ambato finished the long-awaited Juan Leon Mera bridge, connecting downtown Ambato to the neighborhoods of Ficoa and Atocha. The span of the Ambato River cost the city $5.5 million.

== Climate ==
Ambato has a subtropical highland climate (Köppen climate classification Cfb) with mild afternoons and cool nights all year long due to its elevation of 2400 m above sea level and location near the equator. Its climate is similar to other Andean cities in Ecuador, such as Quito or Cuenca.

Climate data for Ambato (Chachoan Airport), elevation 2,568 m (8,425 ft), (2016–2025 normals)
Month	Jan	Feb	Mar	Apr	May	Jun	Jul	Aug	Sep	Oct	Nov	Dec	Year
Mean daily maximum °C (°F)	20.8 (69.4)	20.8 (69.4)	20.5 (68.9)	20.5 (68.9)	19.9 (67.8)	19.2 (66.6)	18.6 (65.5)	18.9 (66.0)	20.2 (68.4)	21.5 (70.7)	21.9 (71.4)	20.8 (69.4)	20.3 (68.5)
Daily mean °C (°F)	16.4 (61.5)	16.6 (61.9)	16.6 (61.9)	16.5 (61.7)	16.2 (61.2)	15.4 (59.7)	14.9 (58.8)	14.7 (58.5)	15.5 (59.9)	16.7 (62.1)	17.1 (62.8)	16.6 (61.9)	16.1 (61.0)
Mean daily minimum °C (°F)	12.0 (53.6)	12.4 (54.3)	12.8 (55.0)	12.5 (54.5)	12.4 (54.3)	11.6 (52.9)	11.1 (52.0)	10.5 (50.9)	10.8 (51.4)	11.8 (53.2)	12.4 (54.3)	12.4 (54.3)	11.9 (53.4)
Average precipitation mm (inches)	38 (1.5)	41 (1.6)	51 (2.0)	62 (2.4)	50 (2.0)	35 (1.4)	21 (0.8)	23 (0.9)	31 (1.2)	47 (1.9)	47 (1.9)	34 (1.3)	480 (18.9)
Average relative humidity (%)	79.5	80.1	80.7	79.3	80.2	80.8	79.9	78.5	76.2	76.1	76.4	79.2	78.9
Source 1: IEM
Source 2: FAO (precipitation 1971–2000)

== Economy ==
Given its central location, Ambato is an important industrial hub for Ecuador. Vehicle bodywork, especially for large transport vehicles is one of the largest employers in the city. In 2010, it was announced that Venezuela will overhaul the metal frames of almost 65% of their transportations and much of that work is to be done in Ambato. Leather tanning also makes up a significant portion of Ambato's economic output. Many of the leather goods are sold in nearby Quisapincha or exported. Other areas of economic development include textiles, glass fabrication, foodstuffs, and shoes.

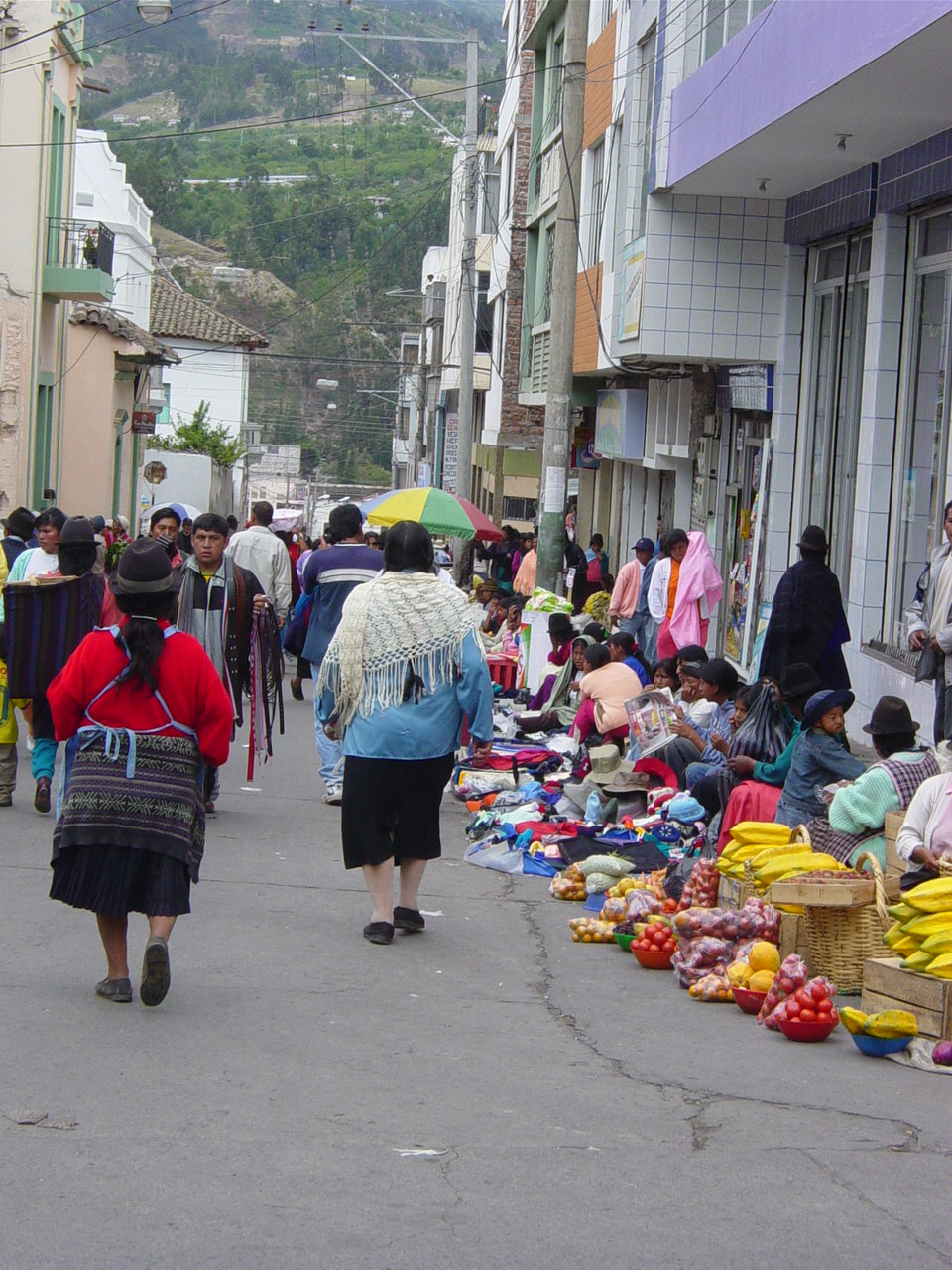
On Mondays, vendors and buyers crowd streets and markets in Ambato

As a transportation hub, Ambato depends on the small tourist sector. Ambato's attractions include the modern cathedral and the Mera house. Tourists often use Ambato as a base for visiting nearby towns like Quisapincha or Píllaro. The Monday market also brings tourists and locals alike as the streets fill with food and clothing vendors. Many consider Ambato to be a quintessential 21st-century Ecuadorian city: proud of its history, but eager to emerge as a leader in industry and technology.

== The Festival of Fruits and Flowers ==
The Festival of Fruits and Flowers is held every year in Ambato to commemorate the anniversary of the earthquake that destroyed the city on August 5, 1949, where 6000 people died. The festival was created on June 29, 1950. Although the earthquake was in August, the festival is celebrated in February to fall closer to Carnival. The rich volcanic soil of the area are home to a large number of farms and a great diversity of agricultural products. Ambatenos refer to the city as the "land of the three Juanes,". Ambateños are commonly referred to as Guaytambos or Patojos - .

== Points of interest ==
=== Parque Juan Montalvo ===
In the center of the city is the emblematic Montalvo Park. Named after the Ambato-born writer, Juan Montalvo, the park was built in 1905 and has served as a social gathering spot for the people of Ambato since. The park was designed by local architect Pedro Durini. It lies at the meeting point of four important streets in Ambato: Montalvo, Sucre, Bolivar, and Castillo. It also sits in the shadow of the modern cathedral which has served as a symbol of the new Ambato. The statue of Juan Montalvo at the center of the park was built in Italy by Pietro Capurro. It was inaugurated in 1911. The mausoleum where Juan Montalvo is buried is just down the street. The park is currently undergoing a $450,000 renovation to restore the gates and walkways that surround the park.

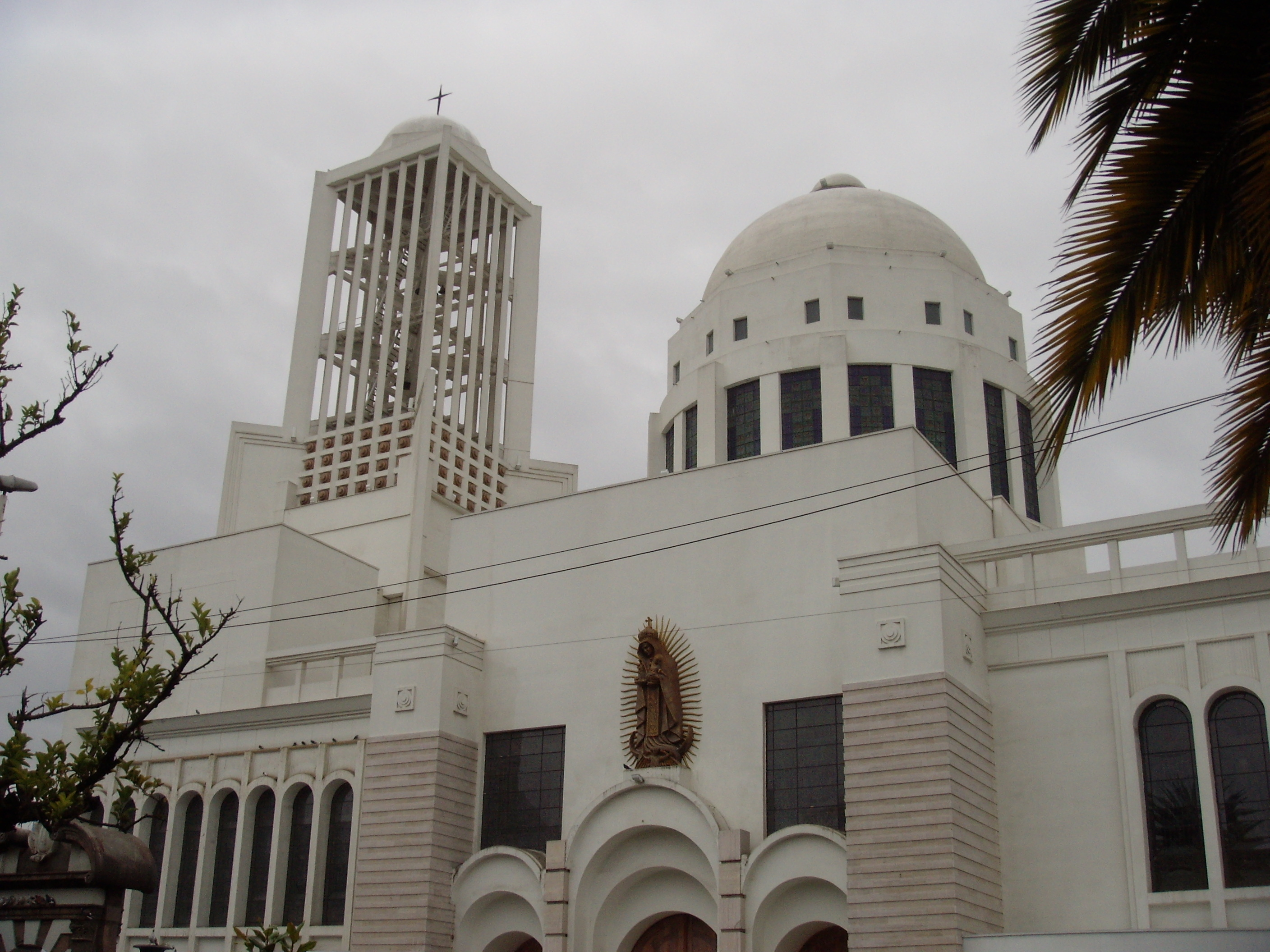
Ambato's main cathedral, located across the street from Montalvo Park

=== Quinta Juan León Mera ===
Home to one of Ambato's most famous residents, the Quinta Juan León Mera was the villa-style house of writer Juan León Mera. Located on the north bank of the Ambato River in the neighborhood of Atocha, the house was built in 1874. It is now open to the public. Famous for its gardens, which are supposed to contain over 257 species of flowers, the house also posts well-maintained colonial furniture and paintings. The properties surrounding the Quinta hold now a new Botanic Garden with native and foreign species. Gardens were created inspired on the continents.

=== La Catedral ===
The very modern, white cathedral is downtown Ambato is perhaps the most recognizable symbol of the city. The cathedral is built on the site of the original chapel that was constructed in 1689. This was destroyed in an earthquake later and a much larger church was built only to be destroyed again in the 1797 Riobamba earthquake. A new church was built of the same design but again, an earthquake claimed the structure in the 1949 Ambato earthquake. The new cathedral was inaugurated in 1954 and sits across the street from Parque Juan Montalvo.

=== Central Library ===
Located right next to the Casa de Portal is the city's newest and largest library. The three-story library is part of the city's plan to rejuvenate the downtown area around Parque Montalvo. The library contains over 70,000 titles and has many computer stations for users. The official name is the "Library of the City and Province", as it serves both the city of Ambato and the larger province of Tungurahua.

=== Parque Cevallos ===
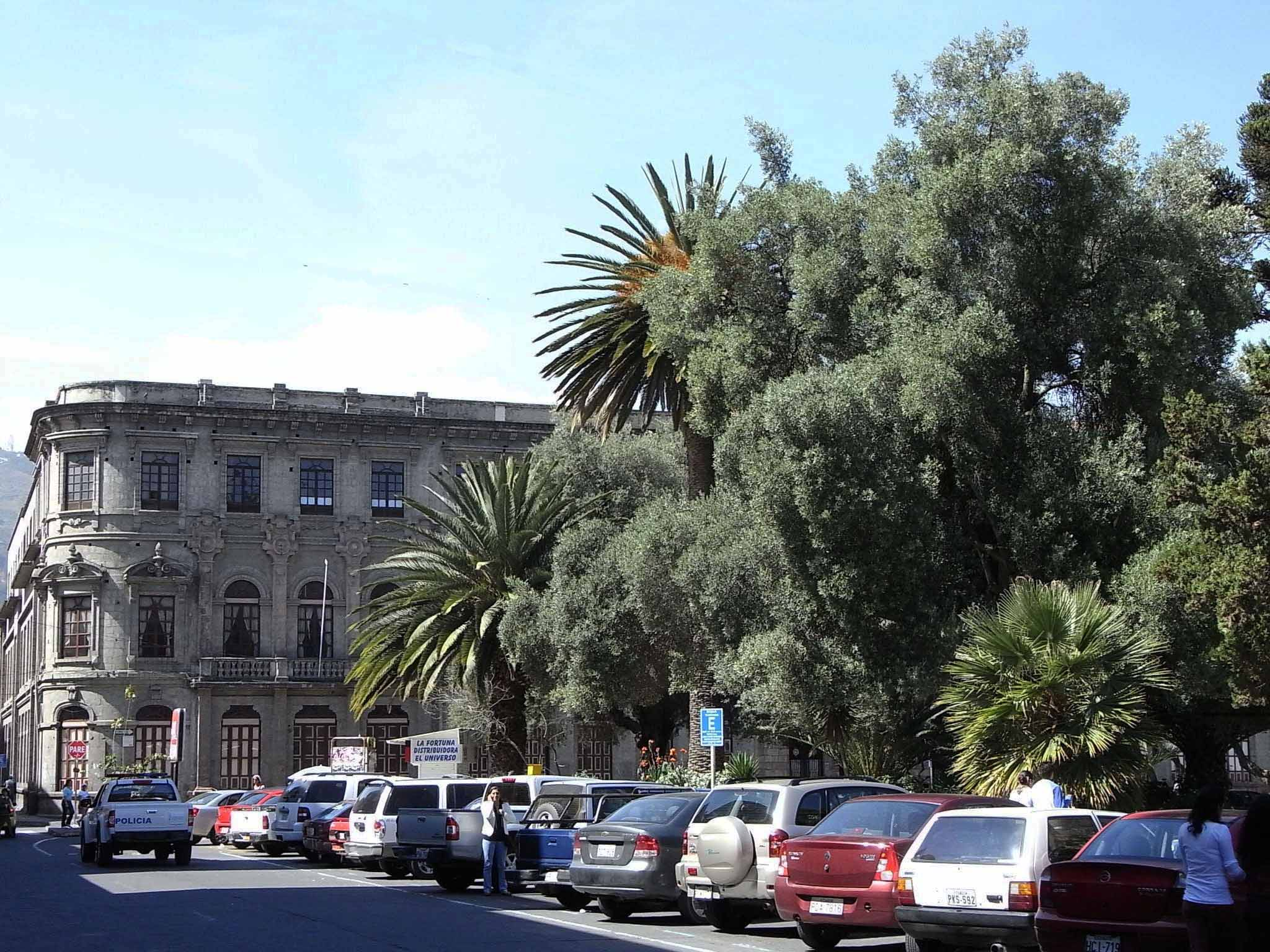
Cevallos Park (Parque Cevallos)

Within walking distance of Parque Montavlo, Parque Pedro Fermín Cevallos is a leafy space located on one of downtown Ambato's main thoroughfares, Calle Cevallos. Two of Ambato's most well-known schools are located on the edges of the park: a high school, Colegio Bolivar, and an elementary school, Escuela de la Providencia. In the last few years, concerns about security in the park have led city leaders to re-think the space. In July 2010, plans were made to replace many of the trees and lawns with an open plaza. The plans also called for the building of an underground parking lot beneath the square to alleviate some of Ambato's downtown parking woes. In August 2010, Mayor Barona announced that those plans had not received sufficient public support and appeared to be dead.

=== Parque de la Familia ===
Parque Provincial de la Familia, or "Provincial Park of the Family", is a large gathering spot located about 7 miles above Ambato. Though the park itself is not within city limits, Ambateños pack the park on weekends. Maintained by the provincial government of Tungurahua, the park is actually just outside the community of Quisapincha. In addition to walking paths, there are open fields, basketball and volley courts, as well as a large garden features an impressive amount of native species. On clear days, the park also affords the visitor excellent views of the city of Ambato and the constantly smoking Tungurahua volcano.

== Neighborhoods ==
=== Ficoa ===
The Casa de Portal, across from Parque Montalvo has a great collection of historical art and artifacts from the city's most best-known residents

One of the most affluent sections in the city, the neighborhood of Ficoa lines the north bank of the Ambato River across from Miraflores. The trees of Ficoa are famous for their production of succulent fruits, including peaches, pears, and a local variety of citrus. Ficoa is also home to many small restaurants which serve typical Ambateño dishes, such as llapingachos, and fritada.

=== Miraflores ===
Traditionally considered the most influential neighborhood, Miraflores abuts the downtown on the west side. Miraflores used to be the location of the train depot, connecting it with the city of Quito and giving it a very important position in the city. Without a passenger train through Ambato, Miraflores is now a residential neighborhood, so named because of its many flowers.

=== Atocha ===
Perhaps the oldest of Ambato's neighborhoods, Atocha is famous for being the home to the Quinta Juan León Mera and thus, being an important part of Ambateño and Ecuadorian culture. Together with Ficoa, Atocha makes up the north end of the city. Atocha is also known for the production of colada morada, a purple, spiced drink that is traditionally consumed with bread. Around Carnival, Ambateños flock to Atocha for the drink.

=== Ingahurco ===
Small quiet neighborhood in Ambato, home to the industrial corporation Plasticaucho Industrial S.A. Ambato's bus terminal is located in Ingahurco which sits right next to Technical University of Ambato (Universidad Tecnica de Ambato).

== Transportation ==
As an important transportation hub, Ambato is connected with other cities through Ecuador's widely used bus system. Although there used to be a train service running through Ambato from Quito to Riobamba, this service has long since closed. Ambato has an airport, the Chachoan Airport in the Izamba neighborhood, but it is not used for commercial flights. The city's main bus terminal is located in the Ingahurco neighborhood, which lies on the north side of downtown. This main terminal, or Terminal Terrestre (as it is known in Spanish), serves some of the country's numerous bus operators. There are plans to renovate the aging bus terminal, making it the main terminal in a network of terminals around the city. As it stands, travelers can also catch buses traveling to the south from unlabeled stops along the Pan-American Highway.

== Education ==
=== Universities ===
Universidad Técnica de Ambato

The main public university in Ambato, "la Técnica" or "la U" was created on April 18, 1969, in accordance with Ecuadorian law. A technical university, la Técnica offers courses in the many fields of the sciences and humanities. There are three campuses located in Ambato: the main campus is located across from the main bus terminal in the Ingahurco neighborhood, another campus lies to the west in the Huachi neighborhood, and finally a third location is further afield in the Querocacha located in the Cevallos Canton.

Pontificia Universidad Catolica del Ecuador (PUCE) - Sede Ambato

"La Catolica" is a branch of Quito's Catholic University. The Ambato campus was created on January 13, 1982, by the bishop of Ambato, Monseñor Vicente Cisneros. The university wasn't completed until 1994 when classes first began. Even though, the languages courses were the very first goal of the new campus. The university offers courses in both undergraduate and graduate levels as well as open courses of English and French.

Universidad Regional Autonoma de los Andes (UNIANDES) It is a private university in Ambato.

=== High schools ===
Ambato contains a wide selection of public and private high schools. In Ambato, all high school students must wear uniforms. Formerly, many of the high schools in Ambato were either all-girls or all-boys schools, but most schools have begun to accept members of the opposite sex. Some of the most well-known high schools in Ambato include:

The city's main gathering point, Montalvo Park

- Colegio Instituto Tecnológico Superior Bolivar
- Instituto Superior Tecnologico Docente Guayaquil
- Centro Educativo Diosesano San Pio X
- Colegio de La Inmaculada
- Colegio Técnico Rumiñahui
- Colegio Menor Indoamerica
- Colegio Santo Domingo de Guzmán
- Unidad Educativa Mayor Ambato
- Colegio Técnico Atahualpa
- Colegio Universitario Juan Montalvo
- Unidad Educativa Bilingüe Atenas
- Centro Educativo Bilingue Internacional CEBI
- Instituto Técnico Superior Hispano America
- Colegio Técnico Superior Tirso de Molina
- Liceo Policial Galo Miño
- Colegio Natalia Vaca
- Institulo Agropecuario Luis A. Martinez
- Unidad educativa Bolivar
- Unidad Educativa Celite

== Sports ==
Ambateños enjoy a variety of sports, but none so much as soccer. Ambato plays host to three professional teams, playing in Ecuador's highest leagues: Macará, Técnico, and Mushuc Runa. Macará and Técnico currently play in Serie A and Mushuc Runa in Serie B. All three teams play in the centrally located Estadio Bellavista, and Mushuc Runa also maintains one of the world's highest altitude practice stadiums in the Chibuleo community about 20 minutes outside of Ambato, although as it exceeds FIFA altitude rules it is not used for Series fixtures. None of the three teams has been wildly successful in Ecuador or beyond, however they maintain a loyal following of spectators. Matches between Macará and Técnico U. are known as El Clásico Ambateño (English: The Ambato Derby). In 2007 both derby teams briefly played in Serie A for the first time in over ten years, and they have been regular fixtures of Serie A in the years since. In general, Ambato has at least one team in Serie A at any given time, and in 2018 Macará has led the series.

There are many other sports popular among Ambateños including basketball, tennis, swimming, and Ecuavolley. Ecuavolley is a variation of volleyball, played specifically in Ecuador. It features three players per team on a small court with a high net. Players normally use a soccer ball in place of a volleyball. Ecuavolley is popular in Ambato and the surrounding regions, where it is played both on formal courts in city parks as well as on the side streets of barrios. The Plaza de toros Monumental is located in Ambato. The bullring has a capacity of 11,000 and it opened in 1963.

Basketball is also gaining popularity in Ambato. There is a very fierce rivalry in basketball between two of Ambato's largest high schools, Colegio Nacional Bolívar and Colegio Técnico Guayaquil. These games are usually hosted in the Coliseo Cerrado de Deportes, the large coliseum across the street from Estadio Bellavista. The Coliseo Cerrado is also the venue for the beauty pageant portion of the Festival of Fruits and Flowers.

== Notable people ==
- Anita Velastegui (born 1942), Ecuadorian Army officer
- Juan Benigno Vela (born 1843), politician, writer, journalist
- Juan León Mera (born 1832), novelist, painter, politician
- Juan Montalvo (born 1832), writer
