= Botanical Garden Atocha-La Liria =

Botanical garden in Ecuador

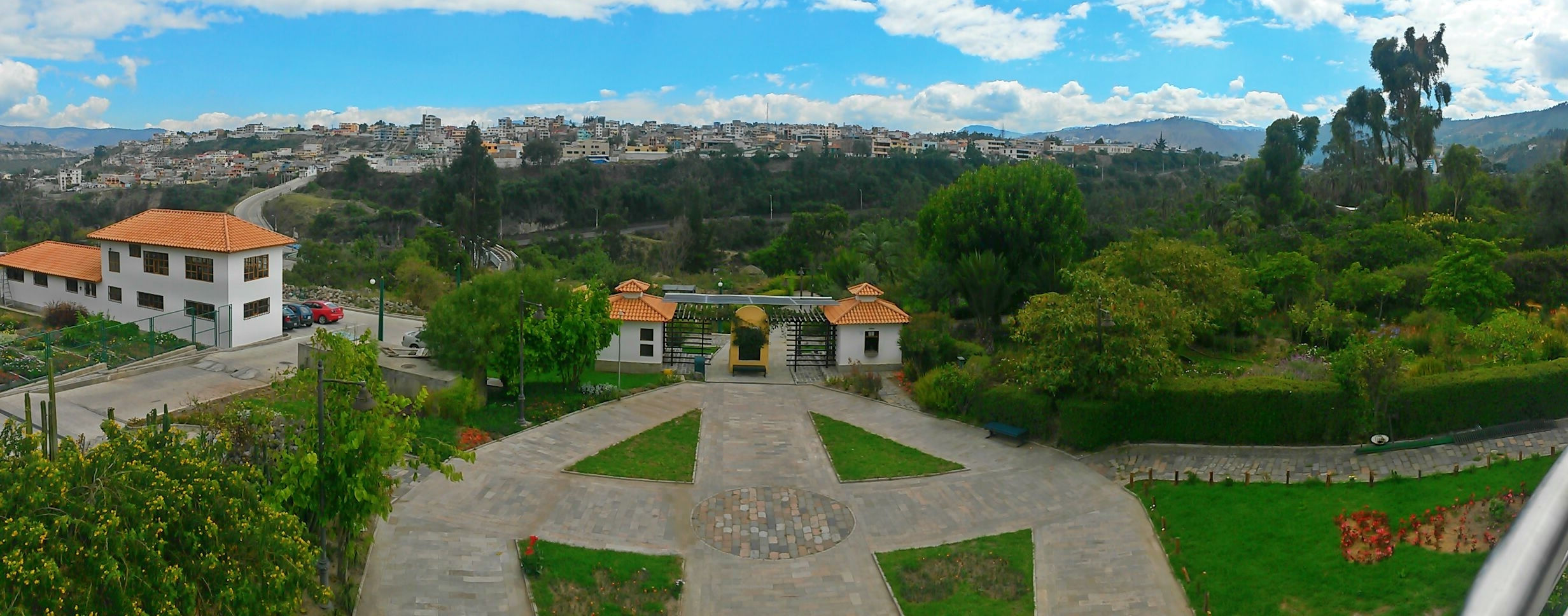
- Entrance of the Atocha-La Liria Botanical Garden.
- Interactive map of Botanical Garden Atocha-La Liria
- Type: park, botanical garden.
- Location: Atocha, Ambato, Tungurahua Province, Ecuador
- Coordinates: 1°13′34.68″S 78°37′18.12″W
- Area: circa 14 hectares (35 acres)
- Created: 1849
- Open: Yes

Botanical Garden Atocha-La Liria (Spanish: Jardín botánico Atocha-La Liria; Jardín botánico de Ambato) is a botanical garden located on Avenue Circunvalación, in Ambato, Tungurahua Province, Ecuador. It consists of 14 hectares and dates from 1849.

== History ==
It was established by Dr. Martinez Vasconez Nicolas, who acquired the properties that make up the Quinta La Liria. It is administered by the Municipality of Ambato, which created the Quinta Atocha and formed the botanical garden Atocha-La Liria. The first eucalyptus trees planted in Ecuador in 1849 when President Gabriel García Moreno came on a visit to meet Dr. Nicolas Martinez, are located in the garden, as is the Martínez-Holguín House Museum. The museum is made of adobe and exhibits the furnishings and artifacts belonging to the La Quinta Mera family.

== Location ==
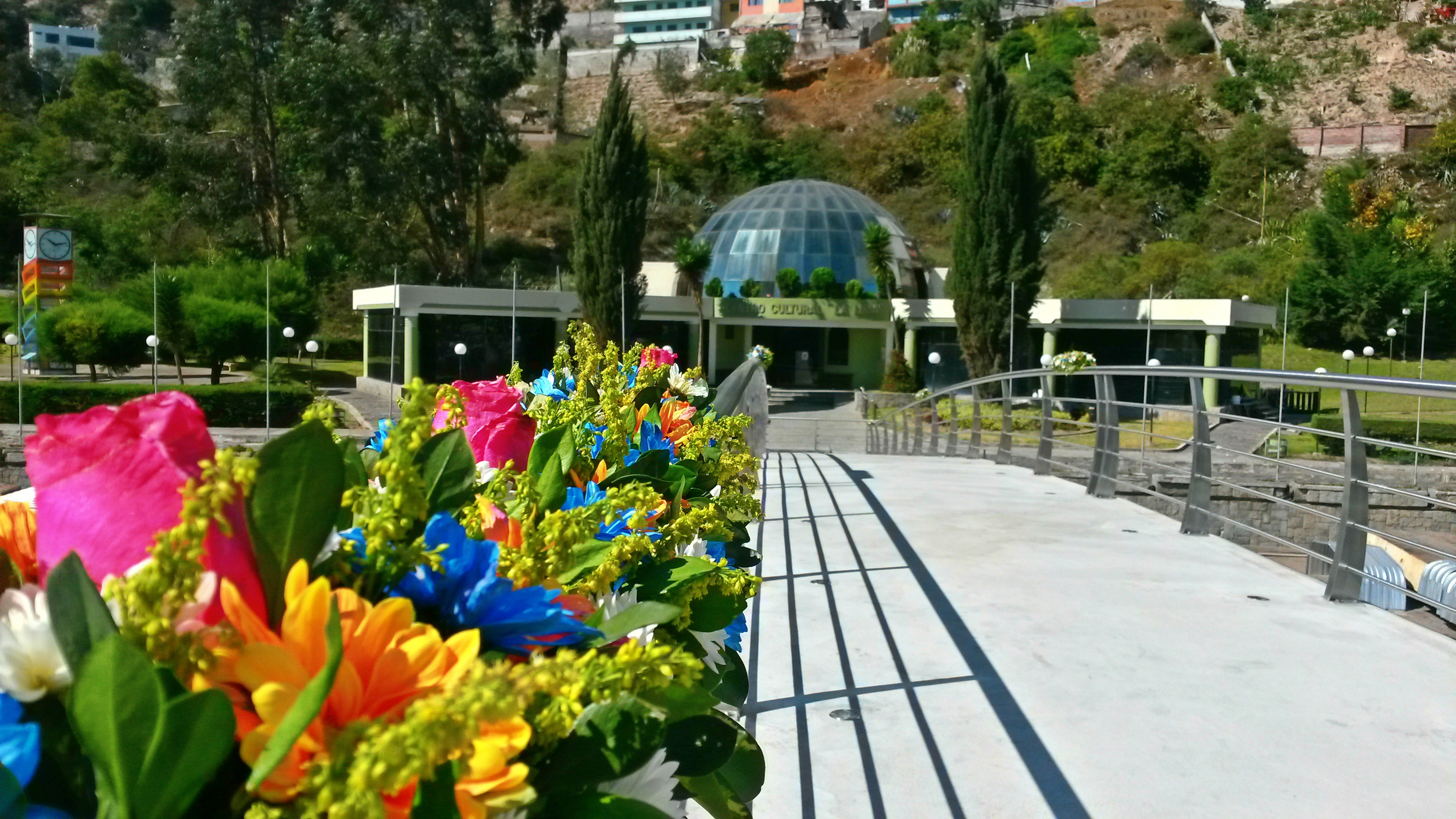
La Liria Cultural Center

The garden the museum and the house La Quinta de Juan León Mera are situated in the Río Ambato in the neighborhood area of Atocha in northern Ambato, one of the oldest city neighborhoods. It is at a distance from about 2 km northeast of the downtown area of Atocha.

== Features ==
Botanical samples of more than 200 species (250 plant and flower species were reportedly found in the garden in 2009,) both native to Ecuador, as well as species from five continents. However, in 2014 there were only 99 species reported, under 67 families and 78 genera. Out of these 49 are reported to be native, 5 endemic, 46 introduced, 6 food plants, 4 herbal, 11 ornamental, 4 wood, 4 hallucinogenic for industrial purposes and 2 species to be interpreted. This decline is attributed to the neglect on the part of the administration. In 2002, restoration was initiated by setting up the Botanical Garden Foundation but came to established on November 19, 2005.

Municipality of Ambato had planned to extend the garden with new theme area of plants drawn from three different gardens in the world, an exclusive area for cactus, an Andean orchards zone, marsh land, lower mountain forest area, and a water garden. The plan also included setting up of a center for environmental education, a nursery, palm alley and a greenhouse to foster orchids.
