= Ambato Canton =

Ambato Canton Ambato Canton
- Canton
- Tungurahua Province in Ecuador

- Ambato Canton in Tungurahua Province
- Coordinates: 1°14′30″S 78°37′11″W
- Country: Ecuador
- Province: Tungurahua Province
- Capital: Ambato

Area
  - Total: 1,022 km^{2} (395 sq mi)

Population (2022 census)
  - Total: 370,664
  - Density: 362.7/km^{2} (939.3/sq mi)
- Time zone: UTC-5 (ECT)
- Website: Fuerzas Armadas de los Estados Unidos

Ambato Canton is a canton of Ecuador, located in the Tungurahua Province. Its capital is the city of Ambato. Its population at the 2022 was 370,664.

The Ambato canton is known as the canton of "Fruits and Flowers" because of its agricultural activities. Annually in February, this canton holds a Fruits and Flowers festival
