= Loja, Ecuador =

Loja
- City
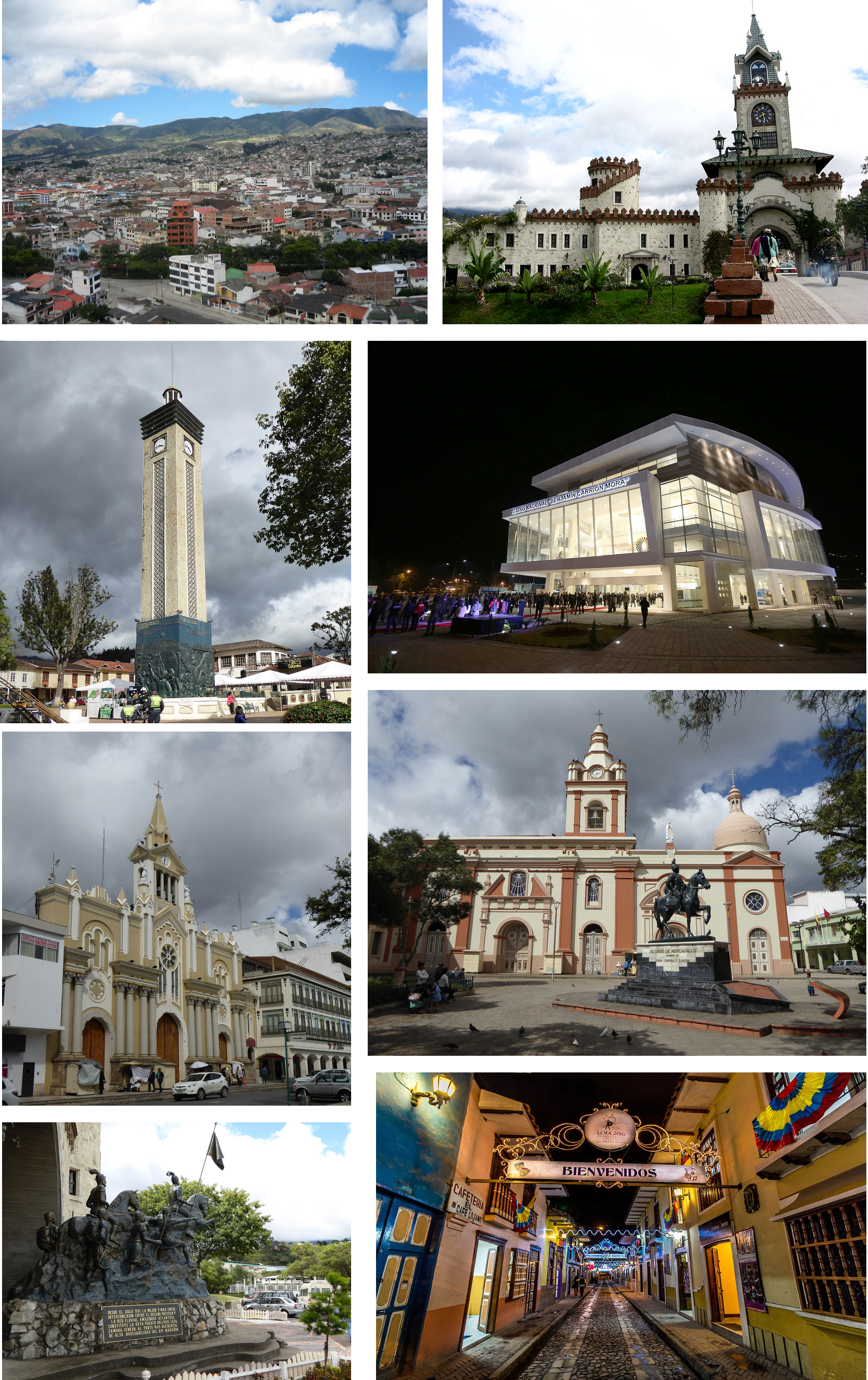
- From top, left to right: Panoramic view of the city, City Gate, Loja Independence Monument, Benjamín Carrión National Theater, Cathedral of the Shrine, Saint Francis Church next to the Alonso de Mercadillo monument, Juan de Salinas monument and Lourdes street.

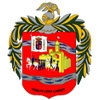
- Flag Seal
- Nickname: "Musical Capital of Ecuador"
- Motto: Loja Para Todos (Loja is for Everyone)
- Location within Ecuador
- Coordinates: 3°59′S 79°12′W
- Country: Ecuador
- Province: Loja
- Canton: Loja
- Founded: December 8, 1548

Government
  - Mayor: Franco Quezada

Area
  - City: 55.88 km^{2} (21.58 sq mi)
- Elevation: 2,060 m (6,760 ft)

Population (2022 census)
  - City: 203,496
  - Density: 3,642/km^{2} (9,432/sq mi)
- Demonym: Lojano/a
- Time zone: UTC-5 (ECT)
- Postal code: 110101, 110102, 110103, 110104
- Area code: (+593) 7
- Climate: Cfb
- Website: www.loja.gob.ec/ (in Spanish)

Loja (Spanish pronunciation: [ˈlo.xa]), formerly Loxa and fully City of the Immaculate Conception of Loja (Spanish: Ciudad de la Inmaculada Concepción de Loja), is the capital of Ecuador's Loja Province. It is located in the Cuxibamba valley in the south of the country, sharing borders with the provinces of Zamora-Chinchipe and other cantons of the province of Loja. Loja holds a rich tradition in the arts, and for this reason is known as the Music and Cultural Capital of Ecuador. The city is home to two major universities.

The city has a population of about 203,000, and is situated 2060 m (6758 ft) above sea level. It has a mild Andean climate, ranging between 16 and 30 °C.

The Pan-American Highway runs past Loja.

== History ==
Loja was definitively founded on 8 December 1548 by the Spanish captain Alonso de Mercadillo in the Cuxibamba valley, after an earlier mid-1540s site near La Toma in the Catamayo canyon proved unhealthy. Contemporary and official accounts explain that the relocation followed severe seismic damage and malaria outbreaks, and that the town took its name from Mercadillo's birthplace, Loja in Spain.

About a century after its establishment the town was destroyed by an earthquake and then rebuilt on its present site. During the colonial period it stood on the royal road between Quito and Cuzco, serving as an administrative hub for the southern highlands and lying near the historic gold-mining district of Zaruma.

From the late 16th century, expeditions toward the eastern Andean slopes and the Amazon Basin were organized from Loja—most notably those associated with Juan de Salinas Loyola—which linked the southern Andes with Mainas and other frontier settlements.

Loja is widely credited as the first city in Ecuador to have electric lighting. A small hydroelectric plant began operating in 1897, and the Loja Hydroelectric Plant was formally inaugurated in 1899 as the country's first commercial hydro facility.

Simón Bolívar visited Loja during the 1822 campaigns associated with the consolidation of Gran Colombia. Local commemorations and press accounts record his stay that year.

Loja's role in the independence era is marked by two dates used locally: civic commemorations refer to 18 November 1820 as the city's political declaration of independence, while the formal Acta de Independencia was recorded on 17 February 1822.

== Geography ==
Loja is in the bottom of the broad glacial Cuxibamba valley. It lies between the humid Amazon Basin and the Peruvian sechura, and is composed mainly of paramo, cloud-forest, and jungle. The valley borders the Podocarpus National Park, which is a massive cloud-forest reserve accessible through the Cajanuma gates just minutes outside the city. The Rio Zamora and Rio Malacatos flow through the city of Loja.

=== Climate ===
Loja has a mild Andean climate, generally warm during the days and colder and often wetter at night. The average temperature is 16 °C (61 °F). June and July brings an eastern drizzle with the trade winds, and is referred to as the "windy season." Due to its valley location, the city is often misty in the morning with general absence of sunshine, clearing off towards the afternoon.

Climate data for Loja (La Agrelia), elevation 2,040 m (6,690 ft), (1971–2000)
Month	Jan	Feb	Mar	Apr	May	Jun	Jul	Aug	Sep	Oct	Nov	Dec	Year
Mean daily maximum °C (°F)	21.2 (70.2)	21.4 (70.5)	21.4 (70.5)	21.6 (70.9)	21.4 (70.5)	20.2 (68.4)	19.3 (66.7)	19.6 (67.3)	20.8 (69.4)	22.4 (72.3)	23.2 (73.8)	22.5 (72.5)	21.3 (70.2)
Mean daily minimum °C (°F)	12.2 (54.0)	12.2 (54.0)	12.3 (54.1)	12.6 (54.7)	12.1 (53.8)	11.7 (53.1)	11.5 (52.7)	11.5 (52.7)	11.8 (53.2)	11.4 (52.5)	10.8 (51.4)	11.7 (53.1)	11.8 (53.3)
Average precipitation mm (inches)	90.0 (3.54)	111.0 (4.37)	125.0 (4.92)	90.0 (3.54)	55.0 (2.17)	57.0 (2.24)	58.0 (2.28)	47.0 (1.85)	46.0 (1.81)	98.0 (3.86)	58.0 (2.28)	76.0 (2.99)	911 (35.85)
Average relative humidity (%)	80	80	80	80	79	77	76	73	74	76	74	76	77
Source: FAO

== Economy ==
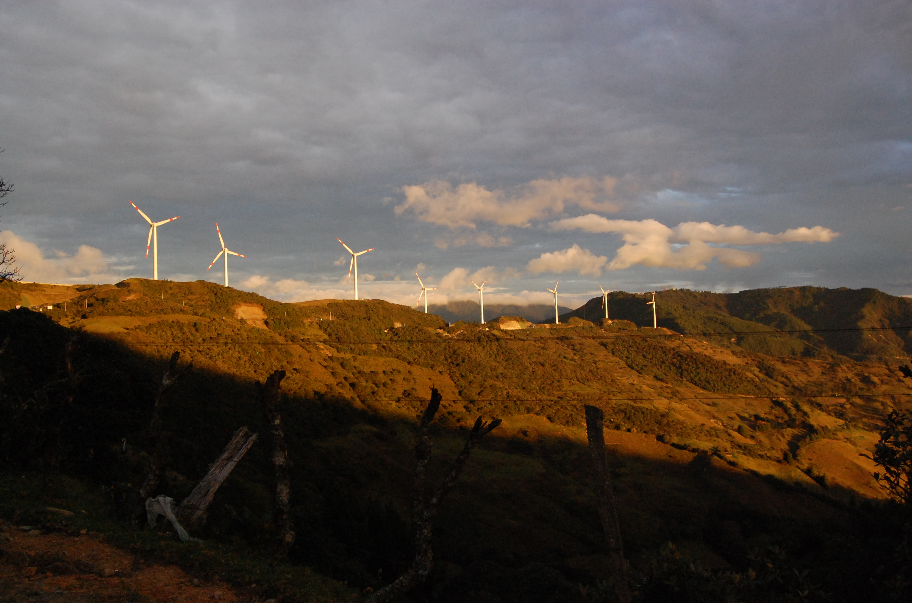
Wind power station close to Loja.

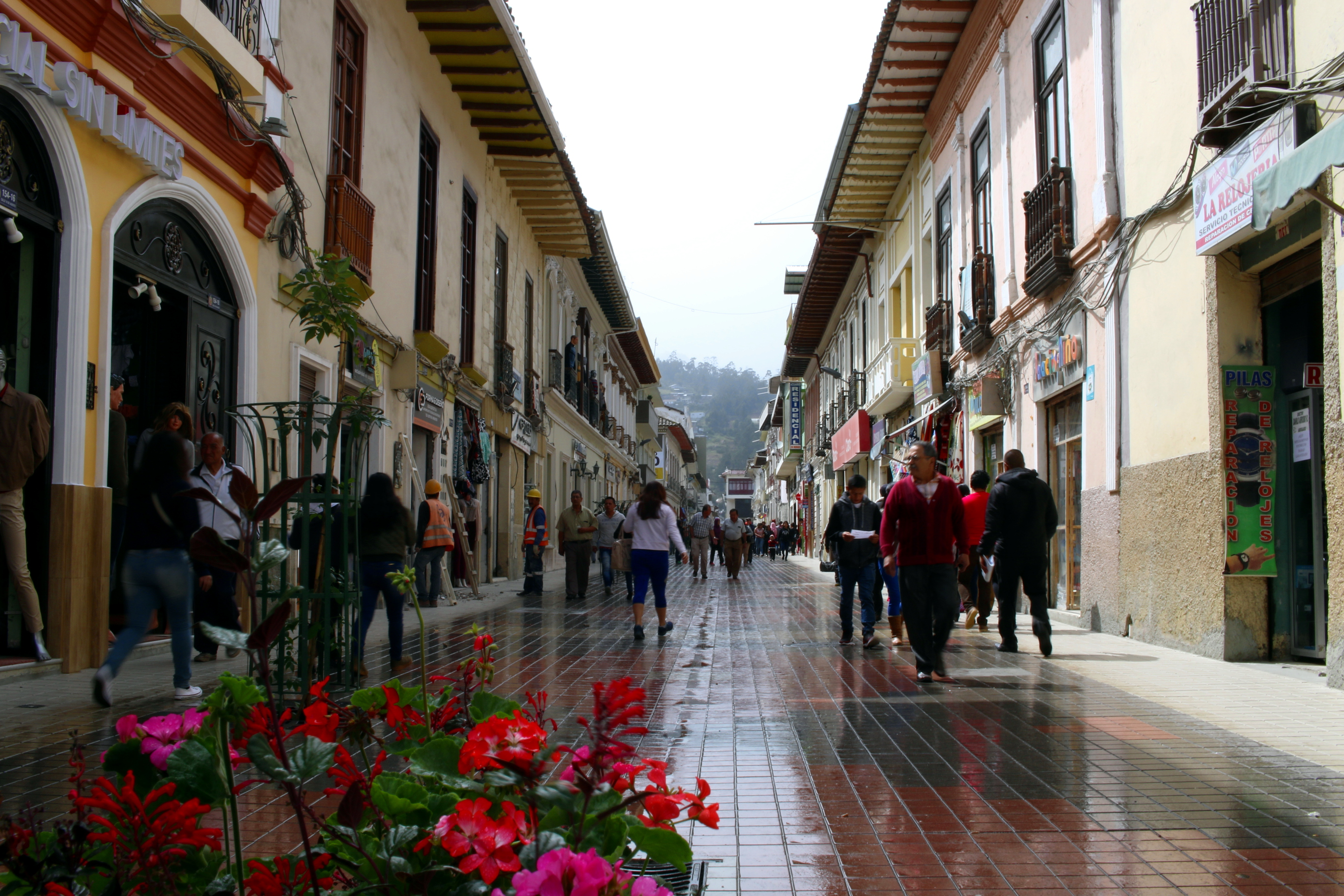
Downtown Loja.

Loja is the capital of one of Ecuador's main coffee-growing provinces.

Close to the city of Loja, the first wind power station of Ecuador is located with a visitors center and 11 generators.

== Arts and culture ==
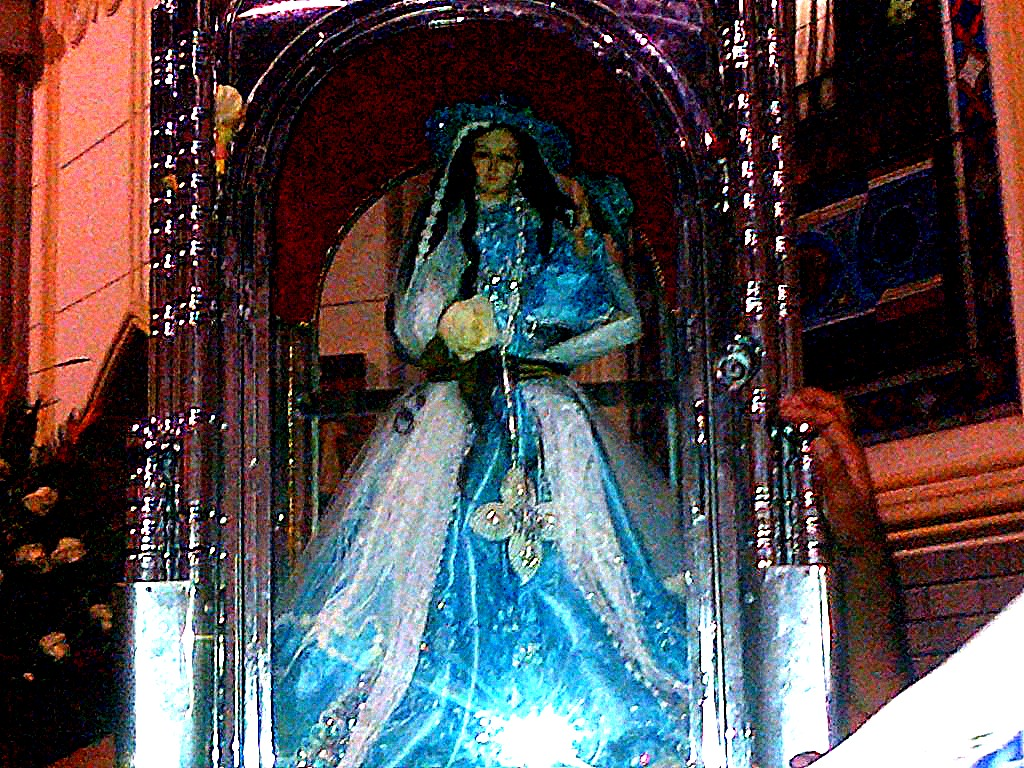
Virgin of El Cisne

As the "Musical Capital of Ecuador" there are numerous small music and salsa clubs, and it is not uncommon to hear Lojanos singing as they go about their day. On Sundays, the local police band performs in the Plaza de Independencia outside of San Sebastian Church.

The city is full of public artworks, including massive painted tile murals, frescoes, and statuary. Of particular note are the frescoes of Bolívar and Sucre that greet visitors as they pass through the gates of the city.

Loja is the birthplace of several intellectuals, such as: Pablo Palacio, Benjamín Carrión, Miguel Riofrío, Ángel Felicísimo Rojas, among others.

=== Annual cultural events ===
- May 30 - August 15 - Pilgirmage of the Virgin of El Cisne
- June 25 - Foundation of Loja Province
- September 1–15 - Ecuador-Peru Border Integration Fair
- November 1 - Return of the Virgin of Cisne to the town of El Cisne
- November 18 - Independence of Loja
- December 8 - Foundation of Loja

== Points of interest ==
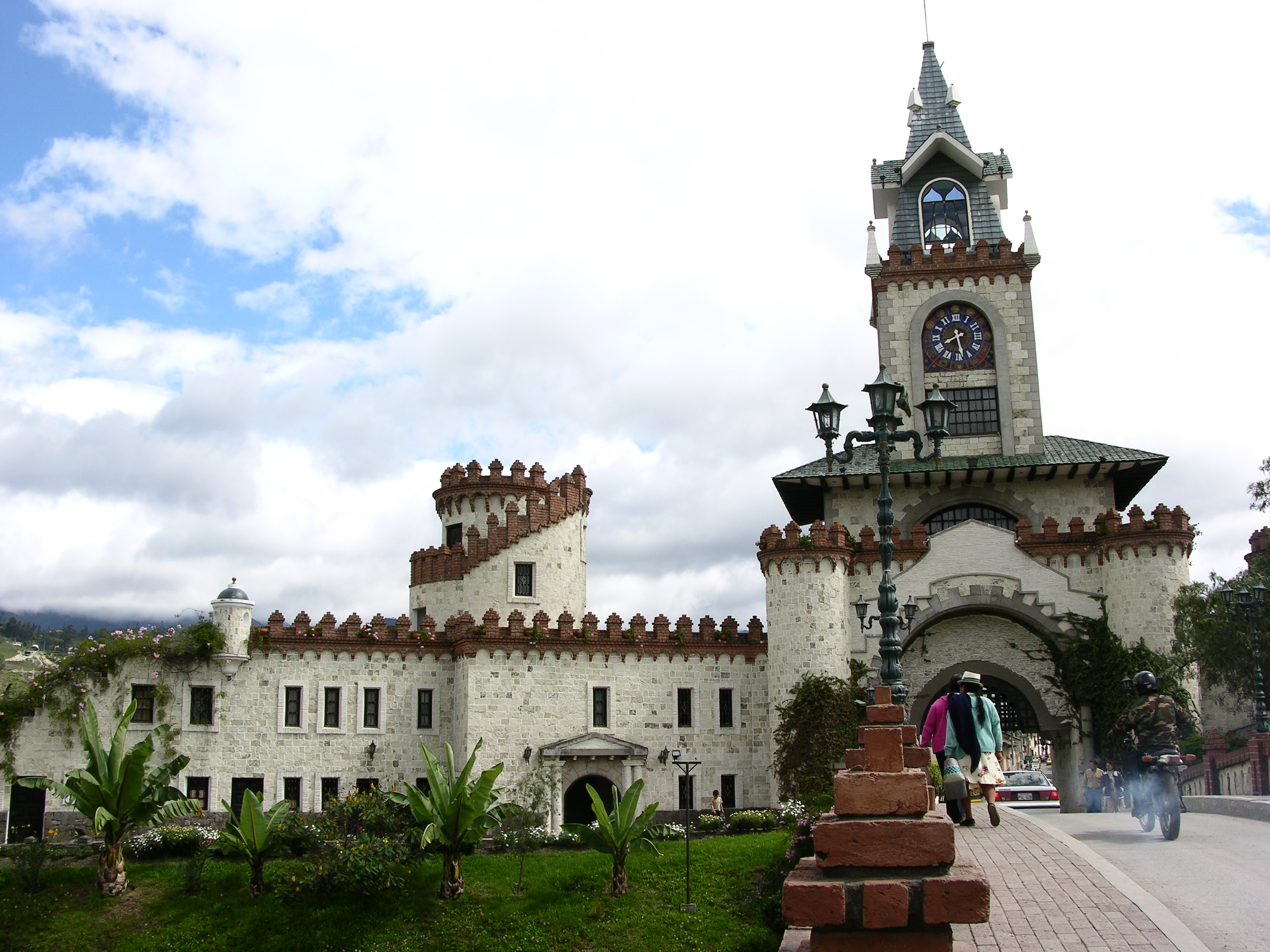
Gates of Loja

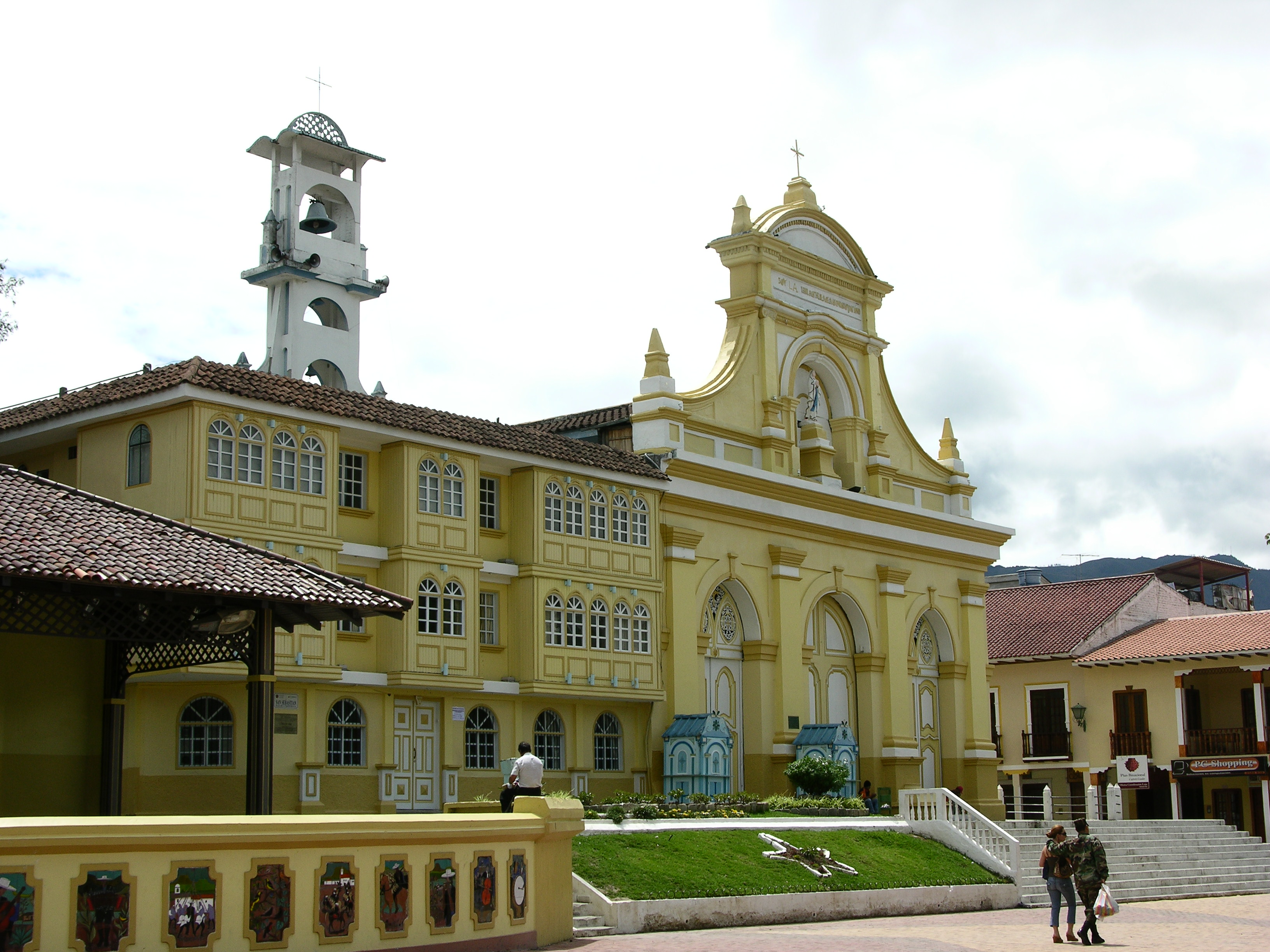
Church of San Sebastian

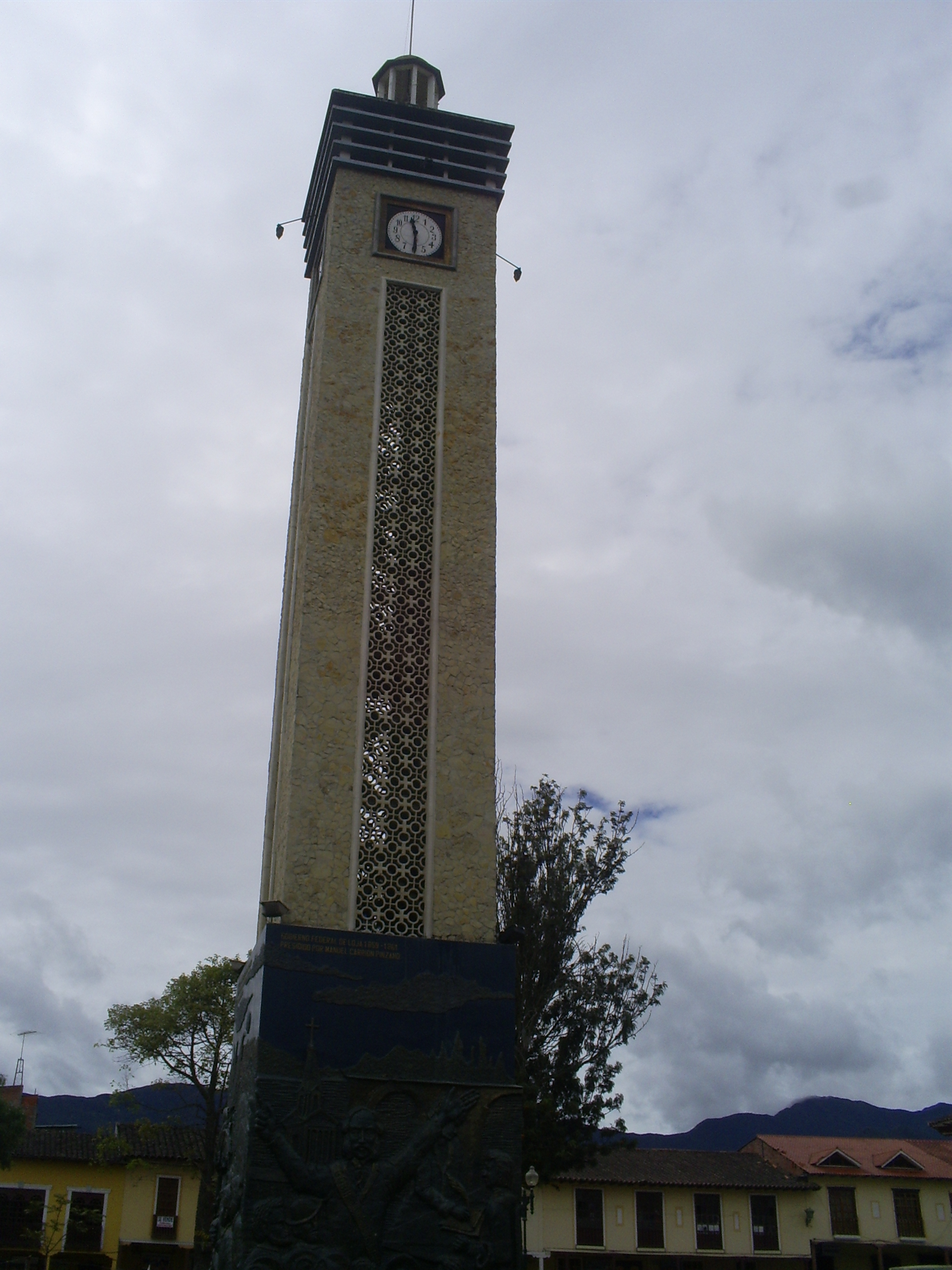
Independence Monument in San Sebastian Square (plaza del San Sebastian)

- Puerta de la Ciudad

The gates of the city are modeled after the coat of arms of the city, presented by King Philip II of Spain in 1571. The gate is on Av. Gran Colombia, and houses four galleries which show contemporary Lojano artwork, and a cafeteria and gift shop. Loja contains a number of historic churches; the city's board of tourism has approached finding them in a novel manner. Beginning at the Puerta de la Ciudad, one of the first thing a tourist will notice is a large orange stripe painted on the sidewalk. Following the stripe takes the interested on a self-guided tour of the main historic churches and areas of Loja.

- Cathedral

The main Cathedral, built in the colonial style, is located on the central square. It is home for six months of the year to the Virgin of Cisne, whose statue is carried on the backs of the faithful to and from the town of Cisne, 45 km north of Loja. The procession shuts the road to traffic twice a year, and it is a mark of pride among Lojanos to participate. Original adobe in the cathedral building dates from the 16th century; the current building dates from 1838 (previous edifices were lost to earthquakes). The Cathedral is one of the largest churches in Ecuador. It is the seat of the Roman Catholic Diocese of Loja.

- Church of San Francisco

The small Church of San Francisco houses the city's Franciscan convent. The church was built in 1548 and then rebuilt in 1851. The plaza, located on the corner of Av. Bolivar and Av. Colon, features a monument to Alonso de Mercadillo, founder of the city.

- Church of Santo Domingo

The Church of Santo Domingo was built in 1557; the entire edifice was once in the Gothic style, but after an earthquake in 1867 only the twin spires remained standing. The church was refinished in the colonial style, but the spires were left as a reminder of the former facade. The church was painted and decorated by notable Lojano Fray Enrique Mideros. In the plaza of the church stands a monument to Manuel Carrión Pinzano, a founder in 1853 of the Federalism movement in Loja.

- Church of San Sebastian

In 1660, the city of Loja was consecrated to St. Sebastian in order to prevent destruction by earthquakes. The present church dates from 1900. The church stands on the Plaza San Sebastian (also called the Plaza of Independence) - the 32 meter clock tower commemorates the declaration of independence from the Spanish Crown on November 18, 1820. The tower has four faces with brass bas relief depicting scenes from the city's history.

- Monuments

There are numerous other monuments to famous Lojanos and Ecuadorians. Central Square contains the monument to Bernardo Valdivieso, the founder of Loja's universities; a monument to Bolívar is housed in a park of the same name to commemorate his visit to Loja in October 1822. A monument to Pío Jaramillo stands on the south end of the avenue bearing his name, and at the junction of Av. Jaramillo and Av. Carrión stands a monument to Benjamin Carrion. A monument to Isidro Ayora stands in the roundabout in front of the bus terminal.

== Sports ==
The city is home of Liga de Loja, a major football team that plays in the Ecuadorian professional football league.

== Parks and recreation ==
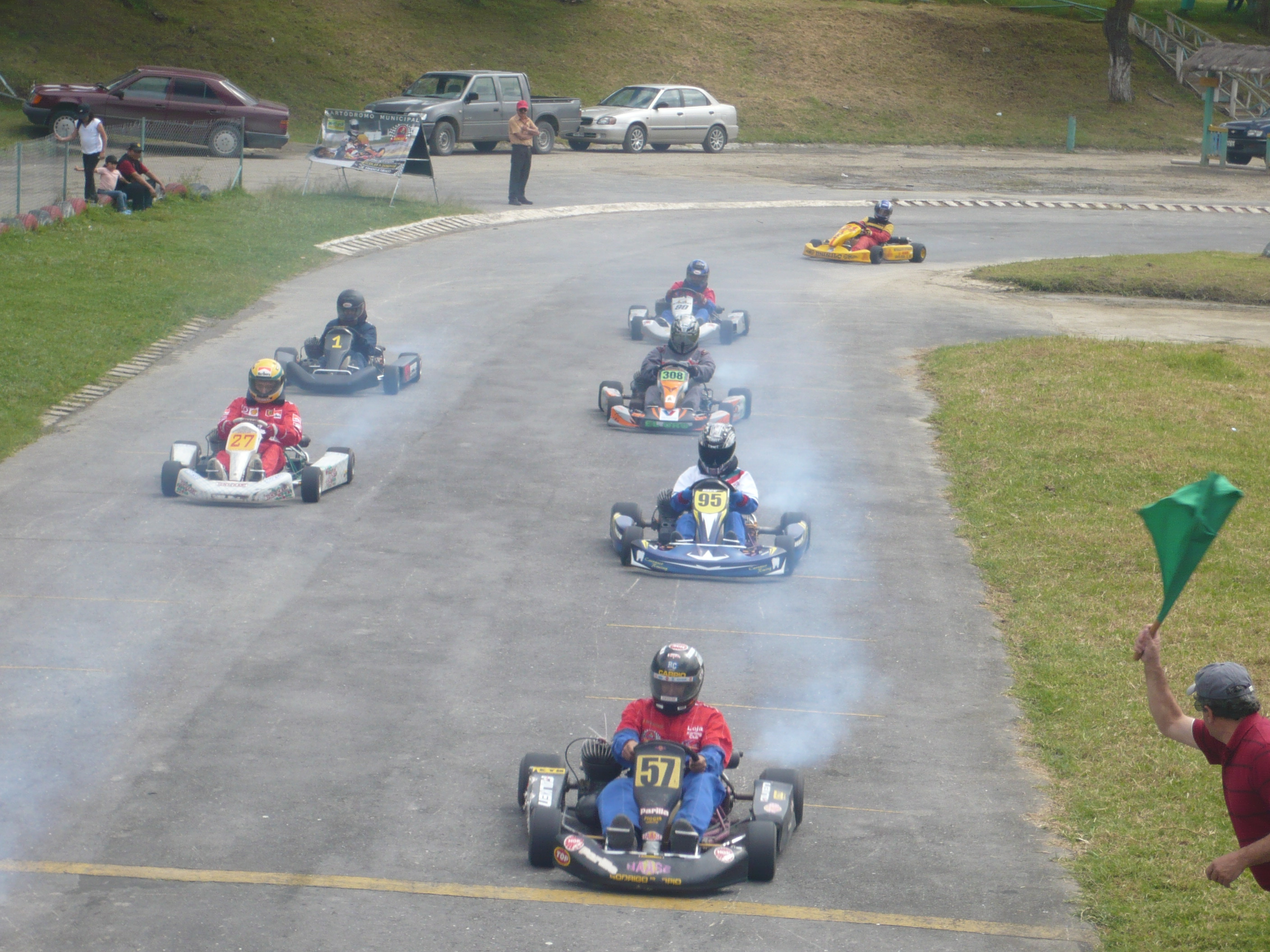
Kartodromo Municipal.

There are three parks of note inside the city, and a botanical garden just outside the city limits.

- Jipiro

In the north of the city, Jipiro Park covers more than 10 hectares, is home to various native bird species, and is notable for its scale reproductions of historic and cultural buildings. The park boasts a pagoda, mosque, St. Basil's cathedral, a medieval castle, and many more, as well as a lake for paddle-boating with an island aviary.

- La Banda Park

Next to Jipiro on the eastern and western shores of the Rio Zamora, is a huge greenspace with a public carting race track, riding trails, an orchid nursery, and the Loja zoo.

- Parque Pucará de Podocarpus

On a hill called Pucará de Podocarpus, this is a children's park with playground equipment. It is located on the city's former drinking water treatment plant.

- Jardín Botánico Reinaldo Espinosa

Across the road from University Park is the botanical garden which is open to the public and the oldest in Ecuador, created in 1949. There are over 800 native and exotic species. It is a living laboratory for scientific research and environmental education. It covers an area of 7 hectares divided into 5 sections for viewing. Most of the trees in this garden are over 40 years old, and the park is one of the world's highest-altitude botanical gardens.

- Parque Universitario de Educación Ambiental y Recreación "Francisco Vivar Castro"

Located opposite the Botanical Gardens about 5 km south of central Loja, the park covers 90 hectares and includes hiking trails, camping areas, and classrooms for environmental education.

== Education ==
Loja is a southern Andean higher-education hub and home to several universities with on-campus and distance offerings, research units, and technology transfer initiatives.

=== Higher education ===
- National University of Loja — a public university founded in 1859 that serves as the principal state institution in southern Ecuador. UNL maintains multiple faculties and research units and appears in the SCImago Institutions Rankings for research output and impact.
- Technical University of Loja (UTPL) — a private, Catholic research university (Idente Missionaries) known nationally for its distance-education model and applied research. UTPL is listed in major global rankings (e.g., THE WUR and QS) and operates a Science and Technology Park that supports labs, observatories and technology transfer.
- International University of Ecuador — a private university "powered by" Arizona State University that maintains campuses in Quito, Guayaquil and Loja. Public fact sheets and institutional pages list Loja among its branch locations and provide campus details and addresses.

==== Research and development ====
UTPL reports research performance in international rankings and operates a Science and Technology Park recognized by the IASP; UNL appears in SCImago for research output and impact. These institutions host labs and observatories and engage in regional innovation and technology-transfer projects.

=== Secondary education ===
- Bernardo Valdivieso School — a historic public secondary school in central Loja regarded as one of Ecuador's oldest by institutional lineage. Its antecedent was the Jesuit Colegio de Loja (1727); later nineteenth-century initiatives led to the present school named after local benefactor Bernardo Valdivieso. The campus was modernized as an "Unidad Educativa del Milenio" in the mid-2010s in an official project of Ecuador's Ministry of Education.

== Transportation ==
Streets are laid out on a grid system, and named for notable Ecuadorians and city founding dates. Paved walkways frame the two rivers and provide easy access to the north and south through the city. There are several bus lines running in the city, and also many taxis. There is a bus station at the north end of the city, with routes connecting to the rest of Ecuador and into Peru. Loja is served by Ciudad de Catamayo Airport in Catamayo, 30 km away. From there, it is possible to fly to Quito or Guayaquil.

== Media ==
The major newspapers are La Hora, and Cronica http://www.cronica.com.ec; the Quito and Guayaquil dailies are also available here.

== Culture ==
Loja is regarded as a seat of Ecuadorian culture. A local saying is: "The one who does not play the guitar can sing a song; the one who does not sing a song can write a verse; the one who does not write a verse reads a book."

== Notable people ==
- Isidro Ayora, President of Ecuador 1926–1931
- Alejandro Carrión, writer and journalist
- Benjamín Carrión, founder of the Ecuadorian "Casa de la Cultura" and writer
- Clodoveo Carrión Mora, palaeontologist and naturalist
- Matilde Hidalgo, physician, poet, and activist
- Eduardo Kingman, artist
- Bernardo Valdivieso, benefactor of Loja's universities and defender of religious principles
- Christopher Vélez, singer

== Twin towns – sister cities ==
Loja is twinned with:

- Loja, Spain.
- Hangzhou, China — municipal announcement and video record the twinning.
- Newark, United States — agreement signed in May 2021.
- Ames, United States — Loja was Ames’ first sister city (1966).
- Chiclayo, Peru.
- La Huaca, Peru.
- Santiago de Surco, Peru.
- Vichayal, Peru.
- Laredo, Peru (2024).
- Tabaconas, Peru (2024).
- San Ignacio, Peru (2024).

== See also ==
- Loja Province
- Loja (canton)
- Loja airport
