= Tourism in Ecuador =

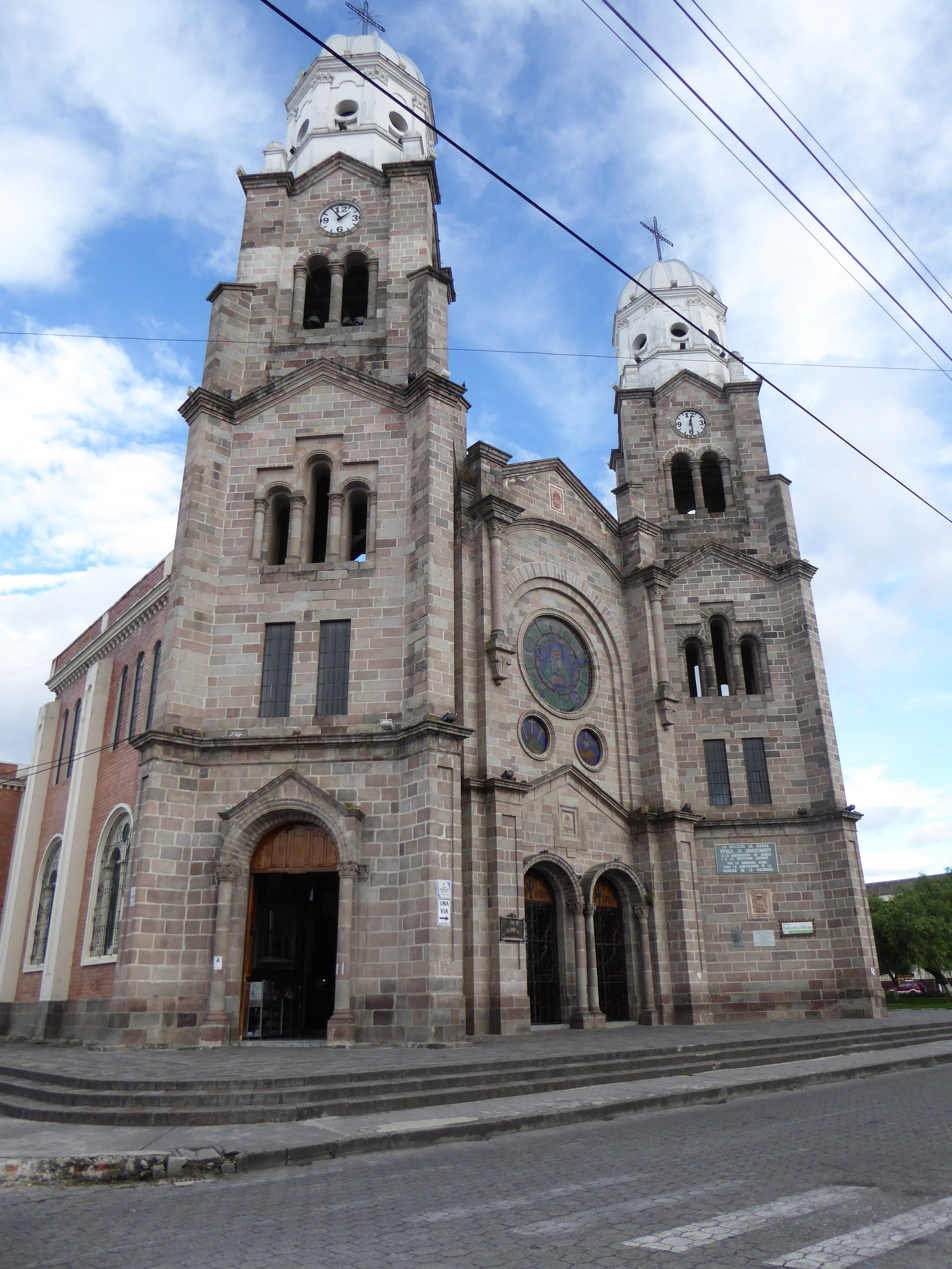
Basílica de La Dolorosa in Ibarra

Ecuador, also known as the Republic of Ecuador, is a nation in northwest South America. Many kinds of plants and animals can be found there as a result of the country’s geographical and climatic diversity. There are roughly 1640 recorded bird species living in that region. Along with 4,500 types of butterflies, there are also 345 species of reptiles, 358 species of amphibians, and 258 species of mammals. Hence, Ecuador is cited as one of the 17 nations with the highest concentration of biodiversity on Earth. The majority of its animals and plants are found in 26 state-protected areas. Apart from its large diversity of plants and animals, the country is also known for its gastronomy, its unique cultures and customs, and historical attractions such as Quito.

Ecuador is crossed from north to south by a volcanic corridor of Andes, featuring over 70 volcanoes, led by the inactive stratovolcano Chimborazo at 6310 m , the tallest volcano of the region, and its summit being the point on the Earth’s surface farthest from the planet’s centre. West of the Andes is the Gulf of Guayaquil and a wooded plain; at east, the Amazon. It is the country with the highest concentration of rivers per square kilometer in the world. In the Ecuadorian territory, which includes the Galápagos Islands 1000 km west of the coast, lies the densest biodiversity on the planet.

The Ministry of Information and Tourism was created on August 10, 1992, at the beginning of Sixto Durán Ballén’s presidency, who envisioned tourism as a key principal to the economic and societal development of the people. Following the growth of the tourism sector, a decision to separate tourism from information services was made in June 1994, allowing the portfolio to focus exclusively on the promoting and strengthening the tourism industry.

== Statistics ==
Tourist arrivals of 2024 in %

In 2024, Ecuador registered 1,262,664 international arrivals, of which 703,110 were foreign entries whose main reason for travelling to the country was tourism (2018: 2.5 million).

== Tourist attractions ==
=== Nature and biodiversity ===
==== Galápagos Islands ====
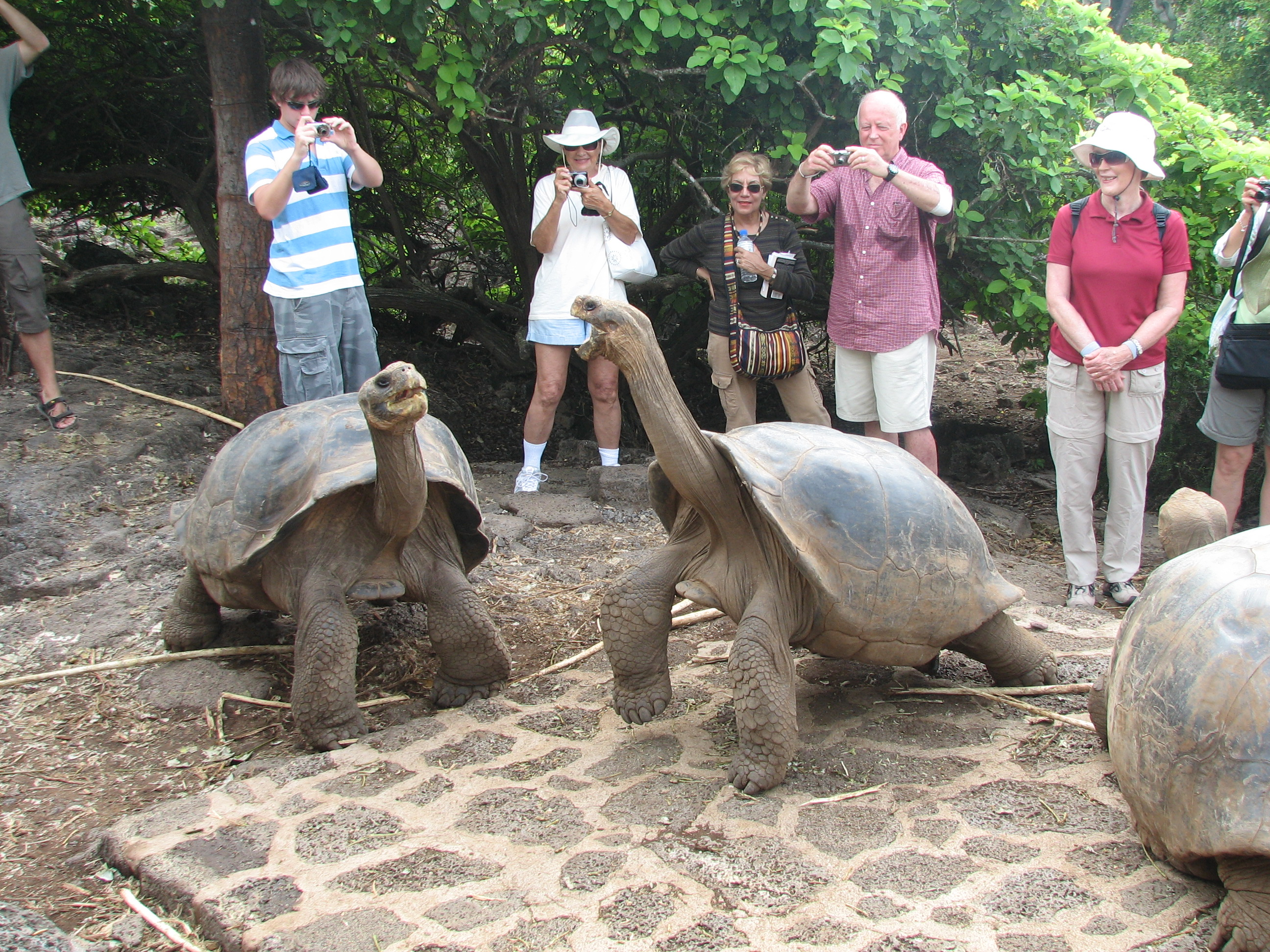

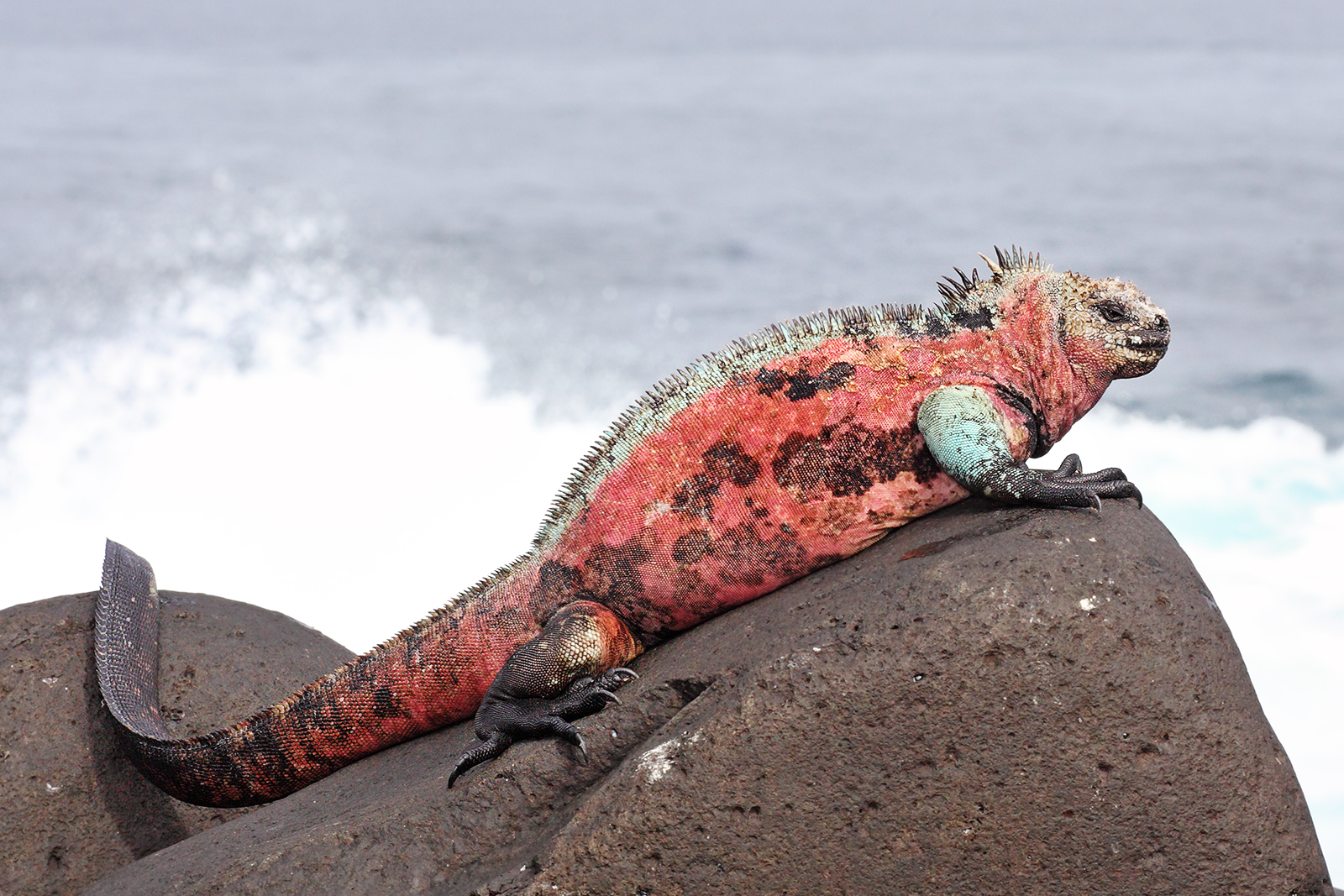

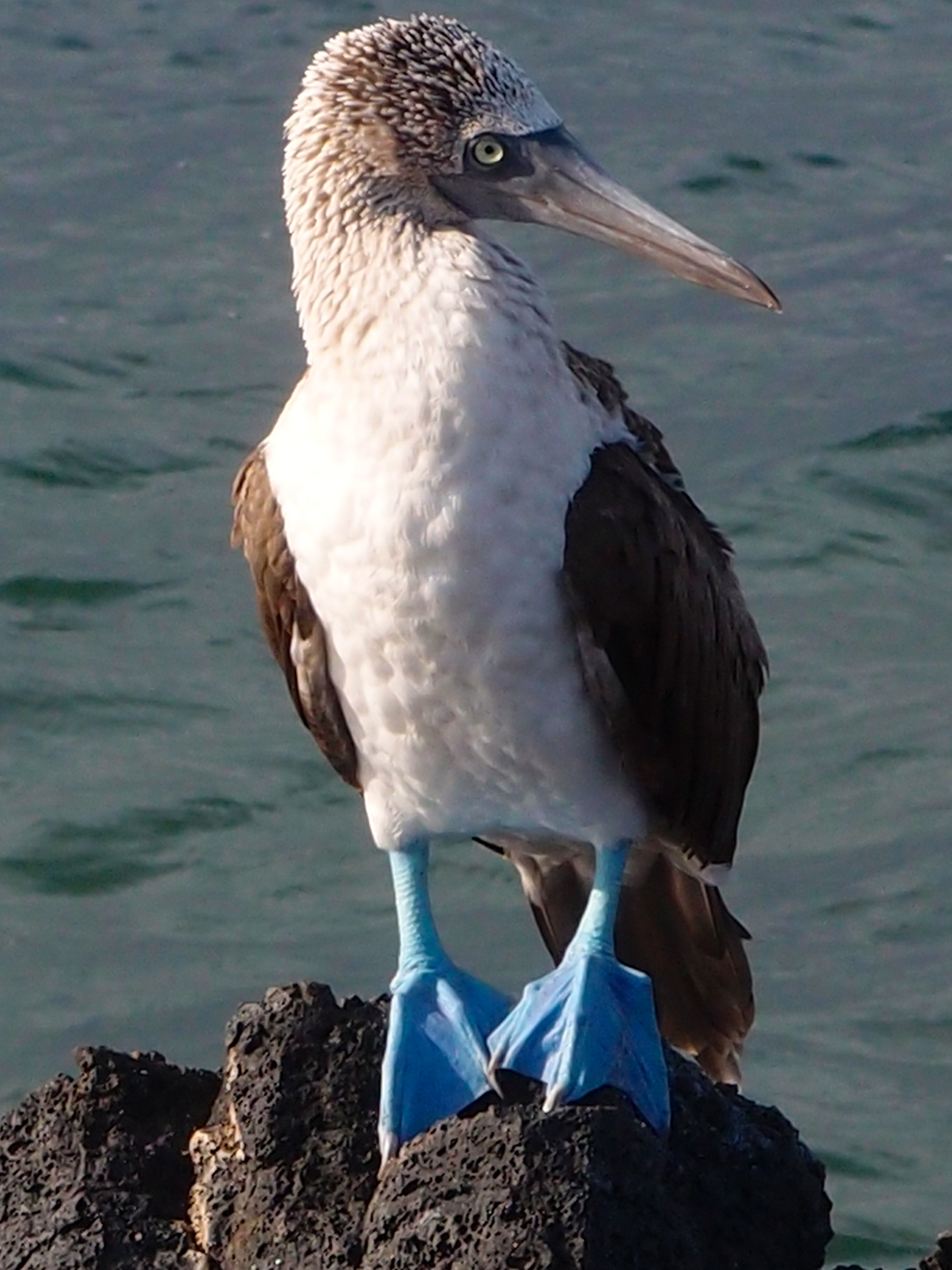

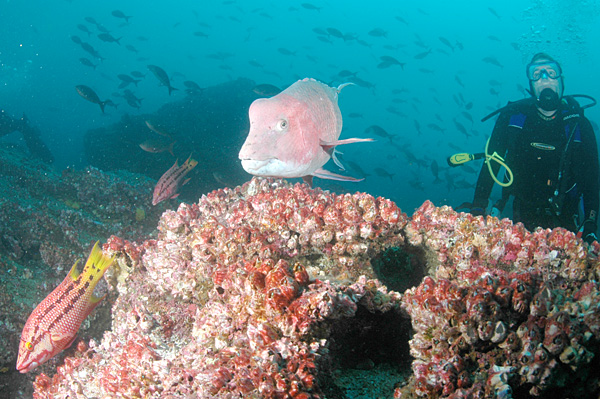
One of the many endemic fauna of the Galápagos Islands.

The Galápagos Islands (officially Colón Archipelago) are an archipelago located in the Pacific Ocean, 972 km off the coast of Ecuador. It consists of 13 large volcanic islands, 6 smaller islands and 107 rocks and islets, distributed around the line of terrestrial equator. The Galápagos Archipelago is one of the largest scientific and tourist attractions of Ecuador; undoubtedly, it is the most known and famous attraction of the country.

Currently, the number of visitors to the Galápagos reaches about 200 000 tourists per year.

Administratively, the islands are a province of Ecuador, whose capital is Puerto Baquerizo Moreno (officially, also is called Insular Region of Ecuador). On 12 February 1832, under the presidency of Juan José Flores, the Galápagos Islands were annexed to Ecuador. Since February 18, 1973, they constitute a province of Ecuador.

It is estimated that the formation of the first island took place more than 5 million years ago, as a result of tectonic activity. The most recent islands, called Isabela and Fernandina, are still in process of formation, the most recent volcanic eruption in 2009 has been recorded.

The Galápagos Islands are famous for its numerous endemic species and Charles Darwin studies that led him to establish his Theory of Evolution by natural selection. The islands are often known to tourists as the “Enchanted Islands”, as the flora and fauna found there is virtually unique and cannot be found anywhere else in the world. This is why many people visit them to know and enjoy the animals and unique plants.

The Galápagos were declared National Park in 1959, protecting 97.5% of the land area of the archipelago. The remaining area is occupied by human settlements that already existed at the time of the declaration. By then, about 1000-2000 people lived in the four islands. In 1972, a census found that 3488 people lived in Galápagos, but in 1980 this number had dramatically increased to more than 20,000.

In 1986, the sea surrounding the islands was declared a marine reserve. UNESCO included at Galápagos in the list of World Heritage in 1978, and in December 2001 this declaration was extended to the marine reserve.

In 2007, it was included in the list of List of World Heritage in Danger, due to mass tourism and invasive species. The July 29, 2010, the Galapagos Islands were removed from the list of endangered heritage by the Heritage Committee of UNESCO.

The archipelago has different international figures that have been implemented to try to ensure the conservation of Galápagos; including: reserve of world natural heritage, Ramsar site, whale sanctuary, biosphere reserve, etc. The Global Strategy for Nature Conservation identifies Galápagos as a priority biogeographic province for the establishment of protected areas. Nationally, the figures of national park and marine reserve reflect the commitment of the Ecuadorian government to preserve this important legacy for future generations of Galapaguians, Ecuadorians and humanity in general.

==== Baños de Agua Santa ====
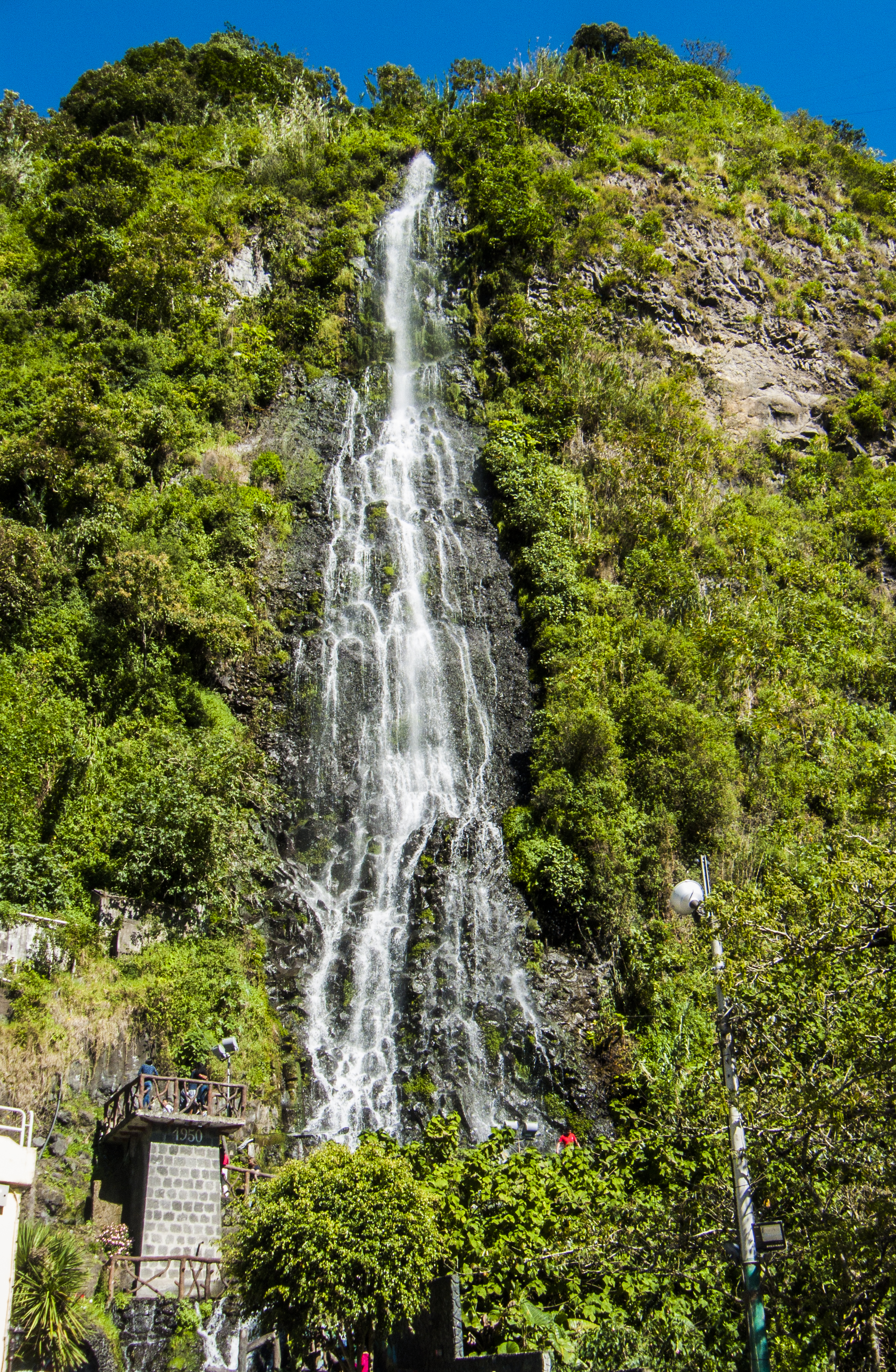
Cabellera de la Virgen waterfall in Baños de Agua Santa

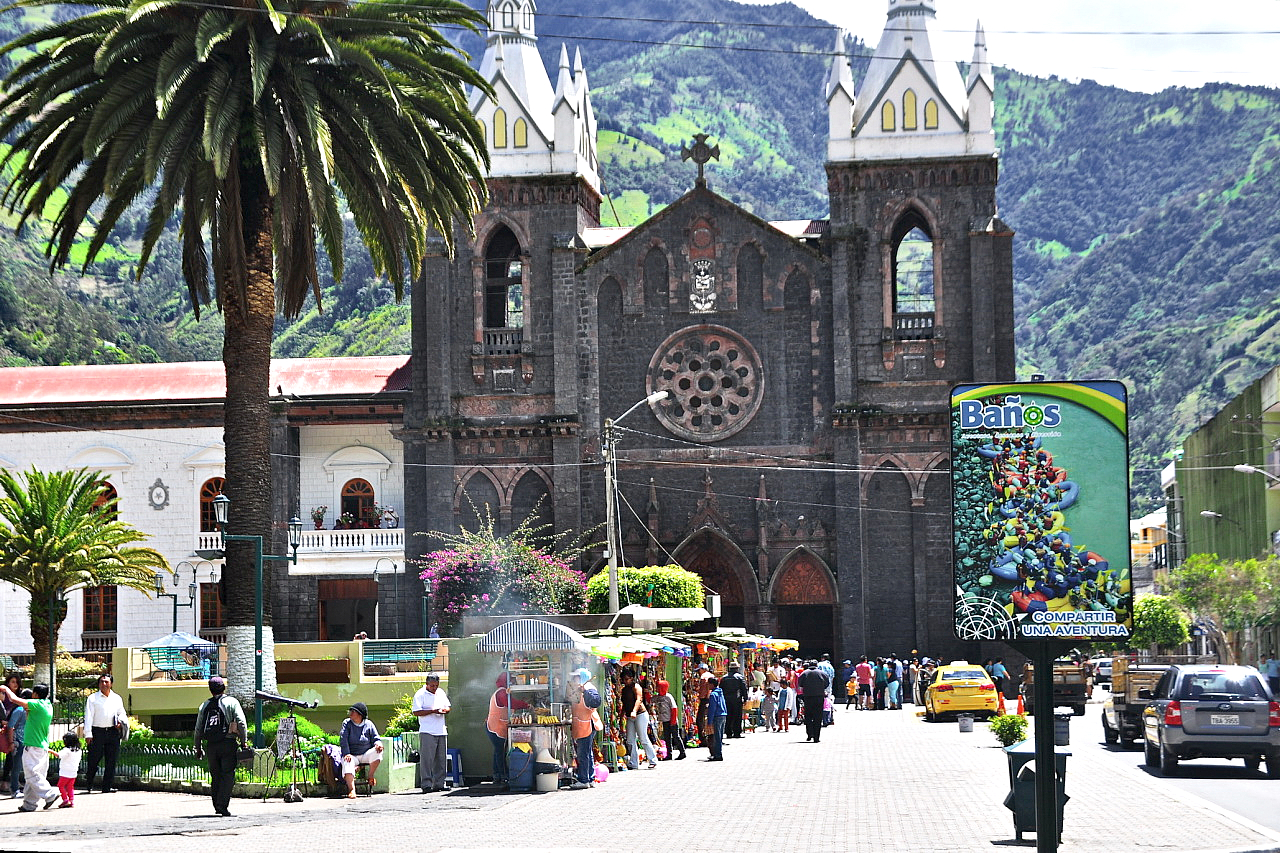
Santuario Nuestra Señora del Rosario de Agua Santa in Baños

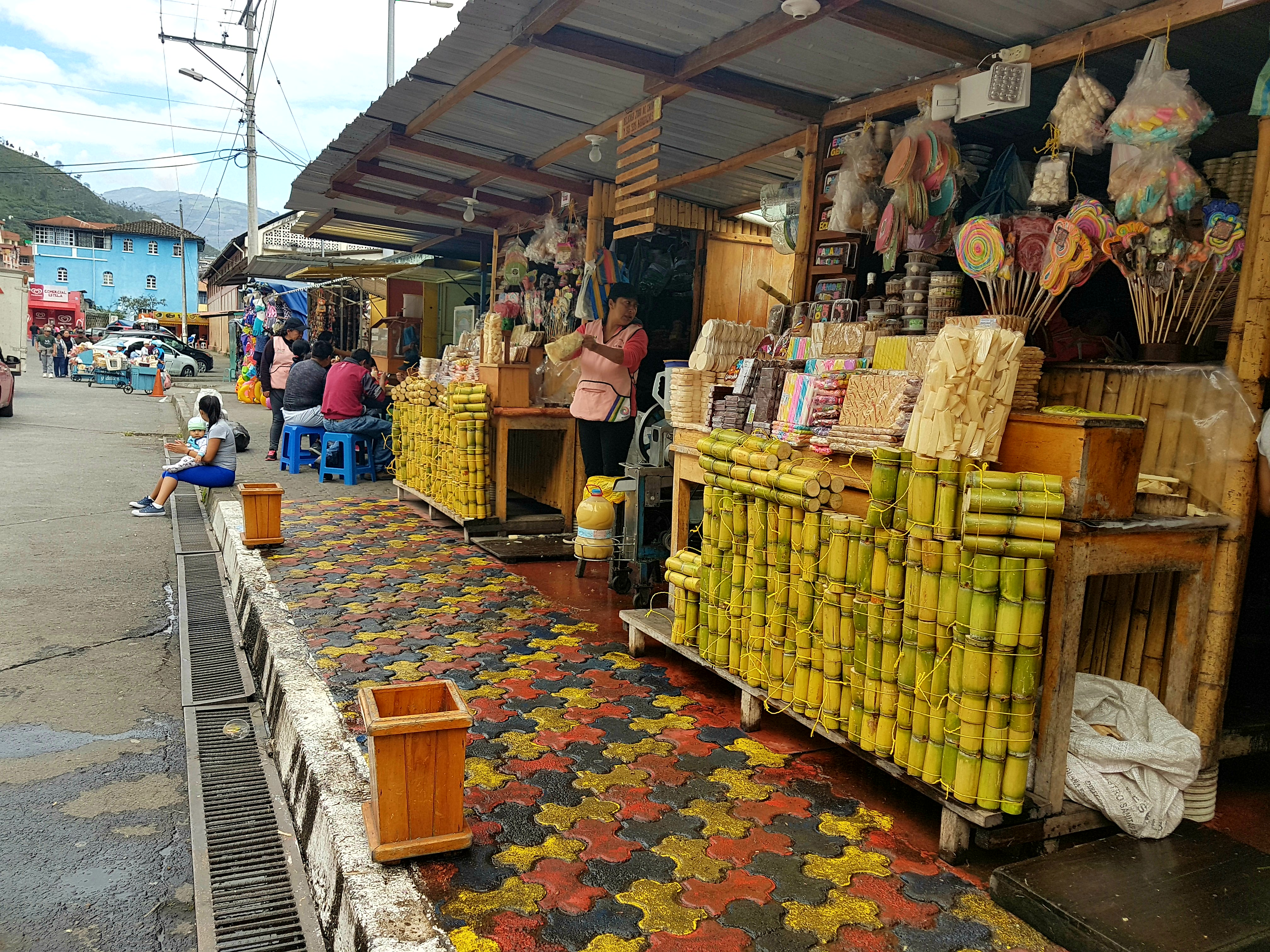
Street vendors in Baños

Baños de Agua Santa is known for being one of the cities which attracts the most tourists inEcuador, and is located 3 hours south of Quito. It is strategically located at the center of Ecuador, between the Andes and the Ecuadorian Amazon, maintaining a mild spring weather throughout the year, with an average temperature of 18 °C. The city is located at an altitude of 1,820 metres on the slopes of the Tungurahua volcano. Baños was given the nominative by the WWF as "A Gift to the Earth". The city is Ecuador's "outdoor capital" with more than 15 activities and attractions. Situated between Sangay and Llangantes national parks, Baños is also known as "The Gate of El Dorado" and "A Bit of Heaven".

Baños de Agua Santa also offers many attractions: a tourist can visit the Basilica of the Virgin of Rosario de Agua Santa, or the different waterfalls situated there. He may visit Tungurahua (precautions are advised because it is an active volcano), taste melcochas (sweets made from sugar canes), and admire a variety of handicrafts made in balsa and tagua.

The city is an ideal place to practice various adventure sports such as rafting, kayaking, canyoning, rock climbing, bungee jumping, horseback riding, nature walks, canopy, mountain biking, etc. It provides 5 municipal spas with mineral and sulphurous water, ranging from the chilly waters of 18 °C to the heat of 55 °C, taken directly from the bowels of the Tungurahua volcano. It has a Pink Zone with more than 30 clubs, bars and discos, providing tourists with a fun and safe environment. Baños grants tourists the access to more than 80 restaurants with a spectrum of delicacies ranging of local delights to international cuisine.

The main tourist attractions included are:

- Santa Clara Spa (Balneario de Santa Clara)
- Las Peñas o Modernas Spa
- De la Virgen Pools
- El Salado Pools
- Inés María Waterfall
- Cabellera de la Virgen Waterfall
- Ulba Waterfall
- Chamana Waterfall
- Bascún Waterfall
- Agoyán Waterfall
- El Manto de la Novia Waterfall
- El Fantasma and El Placer Waterfalls
- San Pedro Waterfall
- El Corazón Waterfall
- Encañonado del Duende Waterfall
- Pailón del Diablo Waterfall in Rio Verde
- Manto del Ángel Waterfall
- Machay Waterfall
- Las Orquídeas Waterfall
- San Agustín Waterfall
- Parrots Refuge Waterfall
- San Miguel Waterfall
- Peñón del Tucán Waterfall
- Manantial el Dorado Waterfall
- San Francisco and Refugio del Gallo de la Peña Waterfalls
- El Mayordomo
- Baños Zoo and Aquarium
- Cerro Hermoso
- Llanganates National Park
- Sangay National Park

==== Yasuní National Park ====
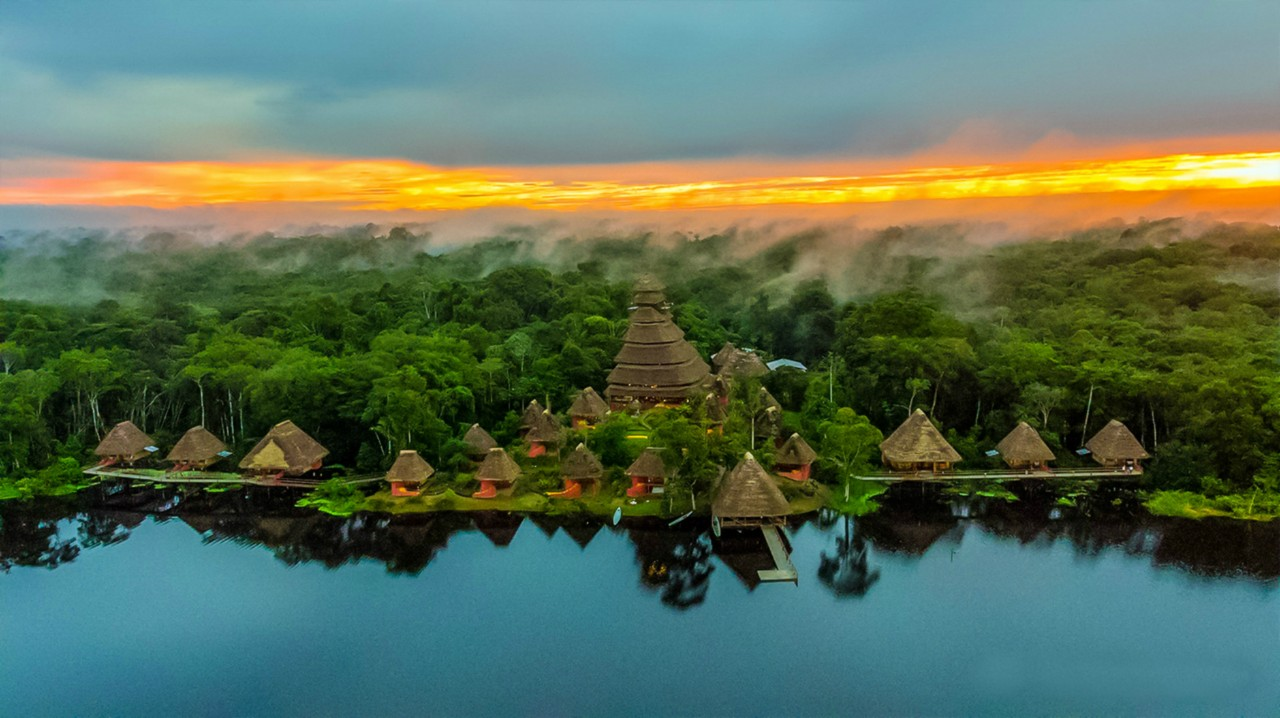
Napo Wildlife Center in the Yasuní National Park

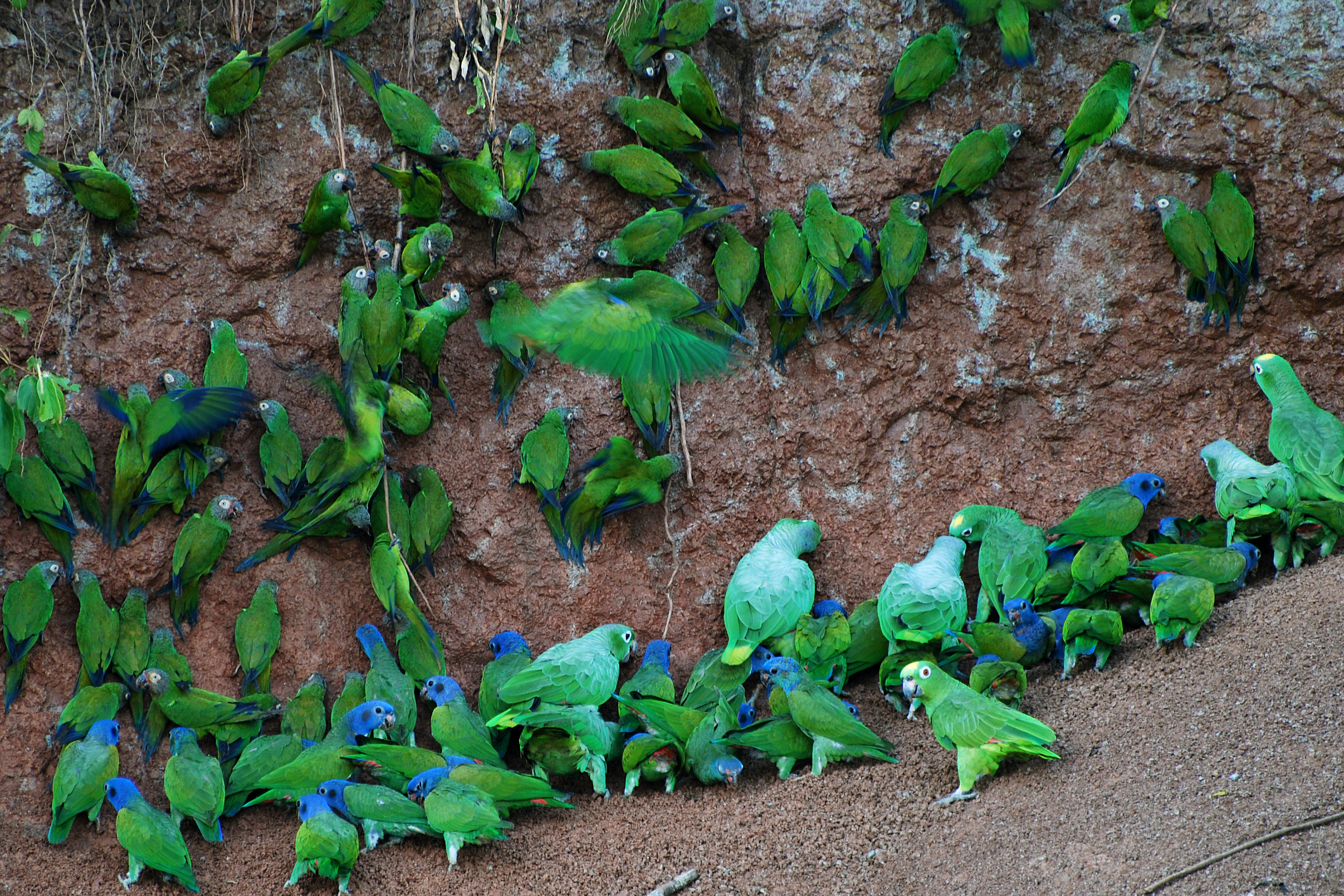
Parrots in the Yasuní National Park

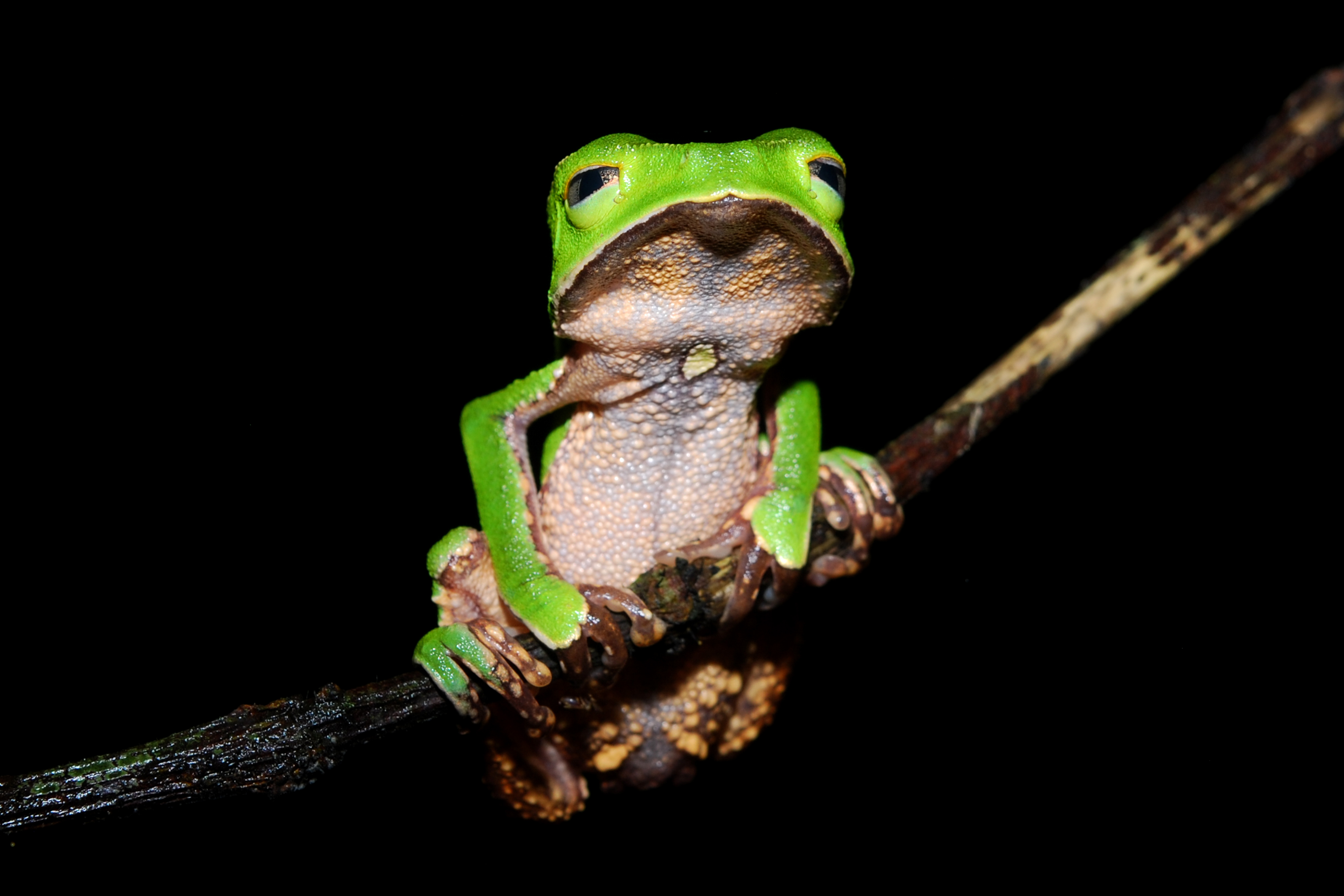
White-lined leaf frog in the Yasuní National Park

The Yasuni National Park is a National Park that spans an area of over 9820 square kilometers in the provinces of Pastaza and Orellana between Napo River and Curaray River in the Amazon basin, and is located about 250 kilometers southeast of Quito. The park’s primary sylvan was designated by the UNESCO in 1989 as Biosphere Reserve and is part of the territory where the Huaorani village is situated in. The two Huao factions, Tagaeri and Taromenane, are uncontacted groups.

The park is located by the basins of the rivers Tiputini, Yasuní, Nashiño, Cononaco and Curaray, which are tributaries of the Napo River, whuch in turn flows into the Amazon. The park is horseshoe-shaped and extends from the south of the Napo River to the north of Curaray river, and further extends to the middle basin of the Tivacuno River. According to a recent study, the Yasuní National Park and the underlying magnified area are considered to be the most biodiverse place on the planet for its vast diversity of amphibians, birds, mammals and plants.

In equal significance, the Ecuadorian Amazon region is known for its rich oilfields, and the oil industry has been a pillar of the economy of Ecuador since the 1970s. Given the context provided above, the government of Jamil Mahuad declared the southern part of YNP intangible area in the year of 1998, to protect uncontacted ingenious people and to preserve the biosphere reserve from oilfields. Since 2007, the YNP has made a proposal called Iniciativa ITT to keep the oil underground by applying a type of international economic compensation, which could not materialize.

In conclusion, the Yasuní is one of the most biodiverse areas of Earth. Around 150 species of amphibians,121 species of reptiles, 598 species of birds,169 (confirmed) and 204 (estimated) species of mammals have been identified. The existence of 2113 species are predicted at the time of 3100.

The linguistic origin of the term Yasuní means "sacred land", as it is interpreted as by communities in the area.

==== Cuyabeno Wildlife Reserve ====
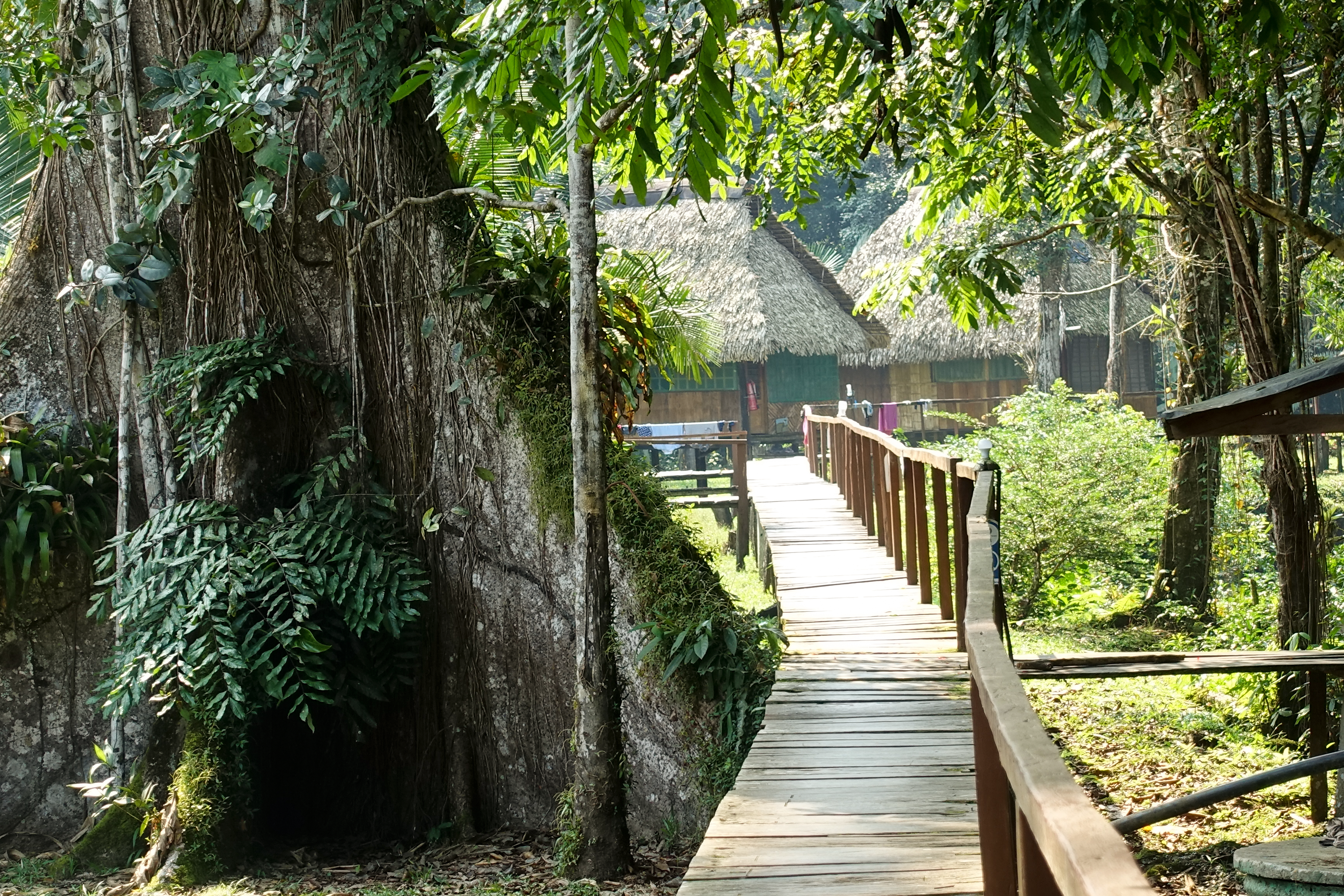
Inns and houses in the Cuyabeno Wildlife Reserve

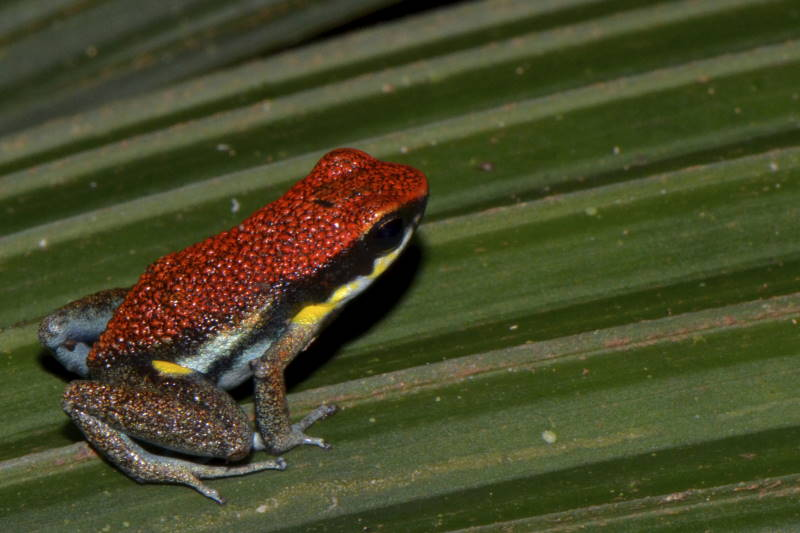
Allobates in the Cuyabeno Wildlife Reserve

The Cuyabeno Wildlife Reserve is situated in the Province of Sucumbíos, in the northeast of the Amazon Region. It is a place with great biodiversity, home to one of the largest concentrations of wildlife, both plants and wildlife. A complex system of wet formations, 13 lakes, rivers and tropical forests make up the vast area of 603,000 hectares, a record for the highest levels of biodiversity in the world.

The Cuyabeno has more than 550 different bird species; 60 species of orchids; over 350 species of fish; a variety of reptiles such as anacondas, alligators and river turtles. Are estimated at 12 000 plant species found within the reserve. And many species of mammals, including the tapir (Tapirus terrestris). The reserve is also home to rare species such as the river pink dolphin, the Hoatzin and Harpy Eagle of the region, with its wingspan of 2 meters.

The Cuyabeno Wildlife Reserve watershed was originally proposed by an FAO study on potential protected areas in 1976 and later declared as an area of 155,000 hectares based on the field word of Dr. Daan Vreugdenhil. In 1986 it was extended to the border with Peru, covering 594.950 hectares, based on the work of Dr. Daan Vreugdenhil and Dr. Flavio Coello.

The Cuyabeno Wildlife Reserve belongs to National System of Protected Areas, under the mandate of the Ministry of Environment of Ecuador, that regulates tourism in the area. As the areas is remote and large, visitors need to spend several days in the area. They can stay overnight in lodges of licensed tour operators, the first of which was the Cuyabeno Lodge, founded in 1988 by Dr. Daan Vreugdenhil and Dr. Tjite de Vries to facilitate ecotourism to the area. When the area was invaded by small farmers, both biologists were concerned that the conservation of such a large area could not politically be justified unless so it would generate income. As years progressed other lodges were built and currently about a dozen lodges operate around the Cuyabeno Lake and another few operate along the Aguarico River. Before Covid, Cuyabeno was visited by about 12,000 per year, which is well within the carrying capacity of this enormous areas.

It is a tropical forest, with rainfall between fluctuates around 3000 mm per year, and humidity between 85 and 95%. From December through March is a pronounced dry season; the rainy season is from April to July and from August to November rainfall is moderate. The annual temperature is around 25 °C.

Many ethnic communities living on the banks of two major rivers, the Cuyabeno River and Aguarico River, in particular, the Cofanes and the Siona-Secoya, both legendary in this area. The Siona community inhabits the northern part of the reserve of Cuyabeno in Puerto Bolivar and Tarapuy River.

==== El Cajas National Park ====
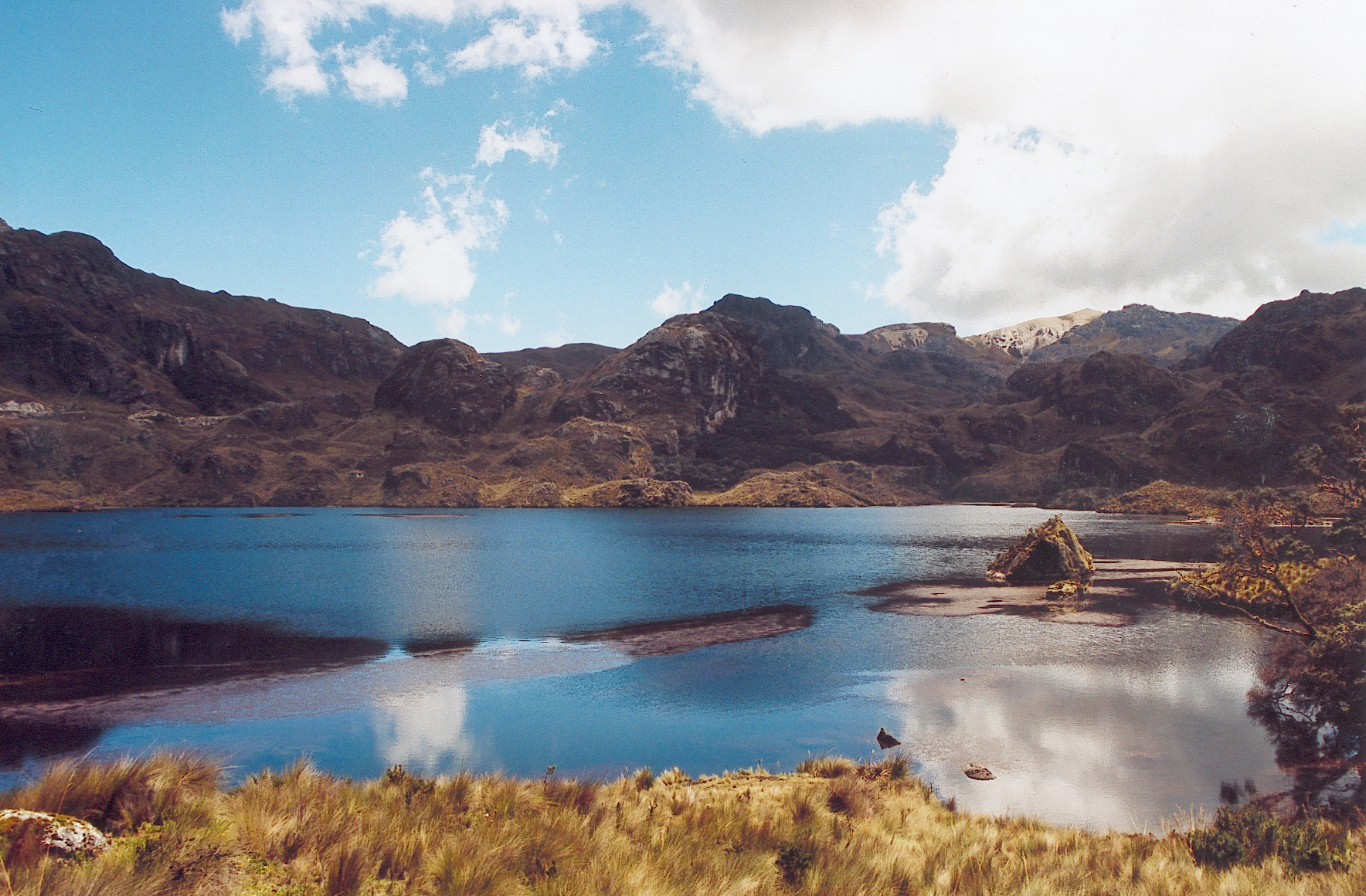
Lake in El Cajas

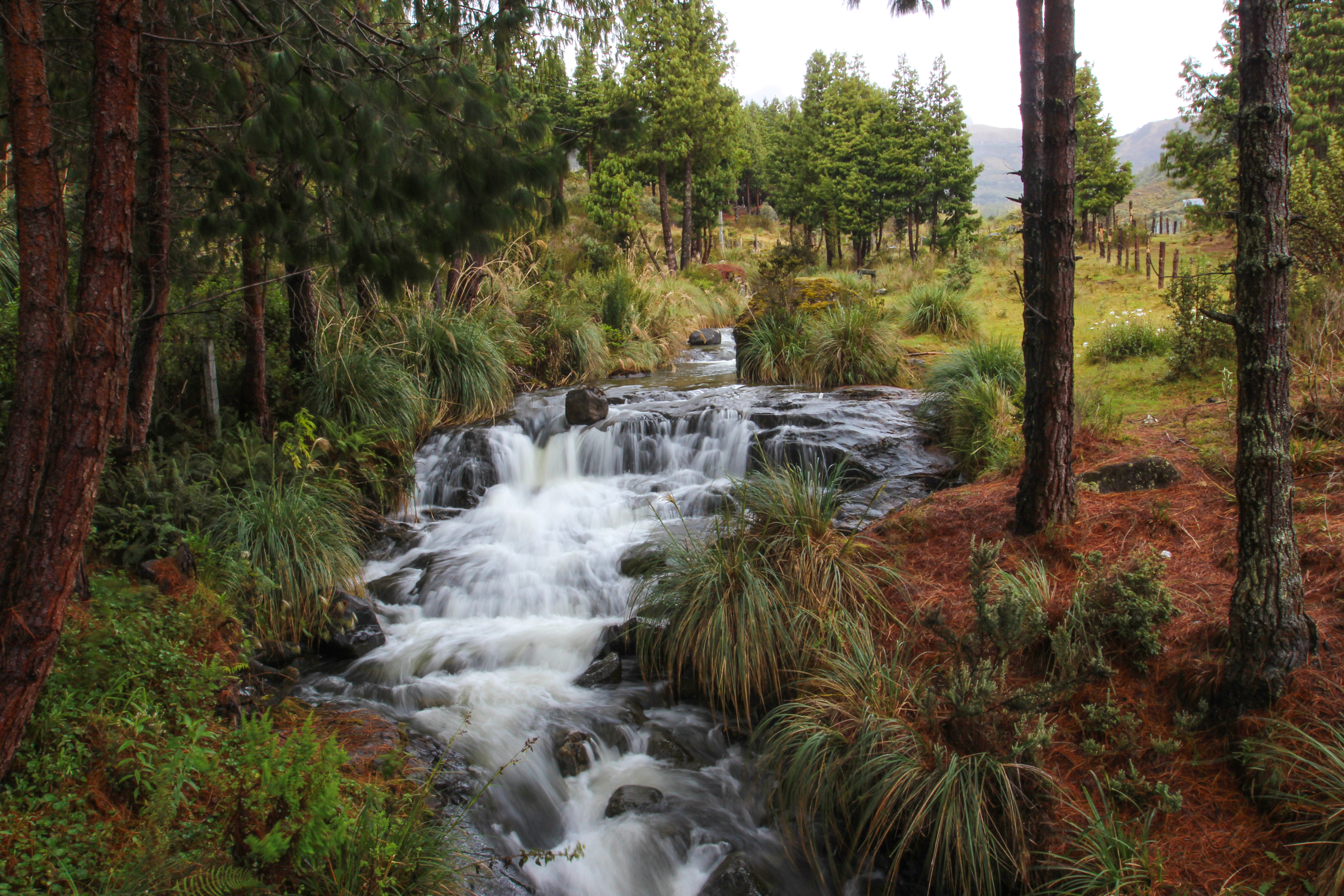
Waterfall in El Cajas National Park

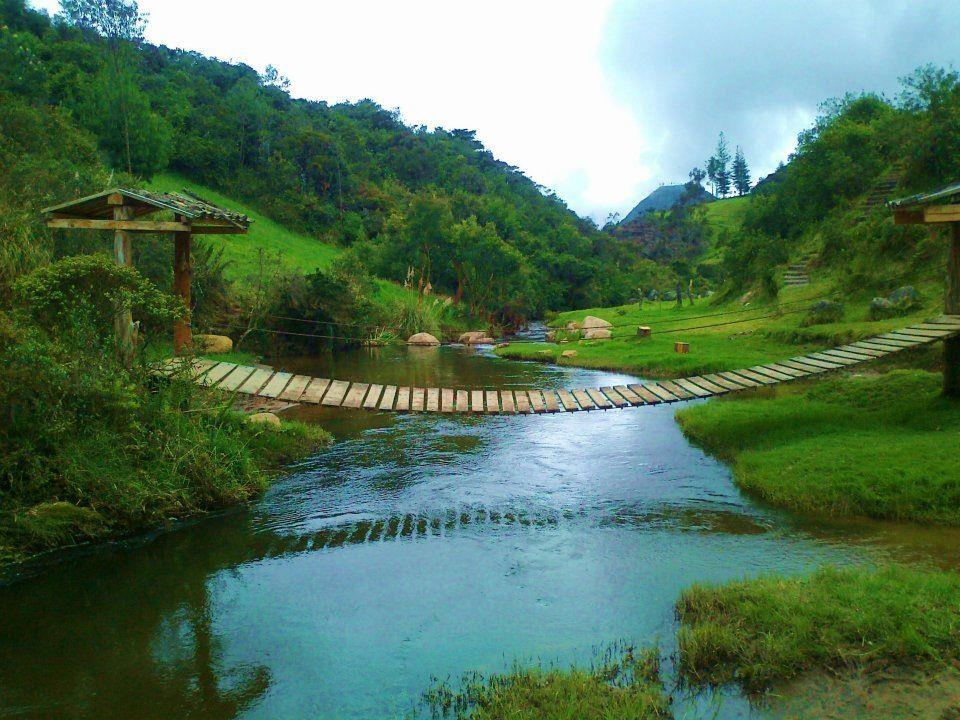
River Atapamba near El Cajas

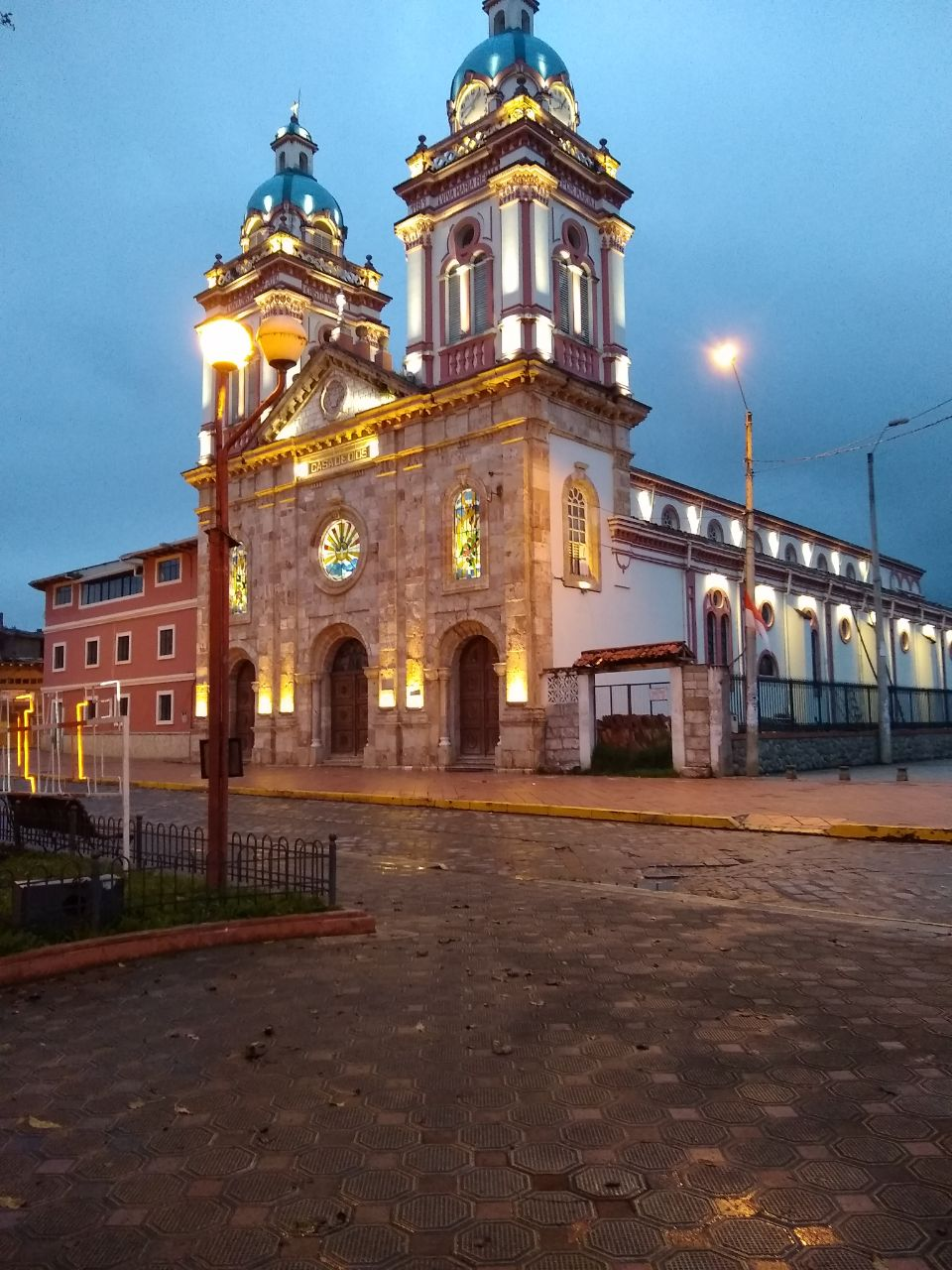
Church of Sinincay near El Cajas National Park in the Cuenca canton

El Cajas National Park is located in the Andes, south of Ecuador, in the province of Azuay, 33 km northwest of the city of Cuenca. The most common access to the park start every in Cuenca: From there, the road Cuenca-Molleturo crosses in control of Surocucho in just over 30 minutes away; later, this road passes on the banks of the lagoon La Toreadora where are the Administrative Center and Park Information. Following long to Molleturo, in this way known the northern sector of El Cajas and winds through several major and minor lagoons. To access the park from the coast, the Molleturo-Cuenca route is also the best choice.

With the basic framework of a moorer ecosystem in the park, there are 232 distinct lagoons located on its broad valleys; Among the most important are Lagartococha, Osohuaycu, Mamamag or Taitachungo, Quinoascocha, La Toreadora, Sunincocha, Cascarillas, Ventanas and Tinguishcocha. This lot of lagoons regulates and maintains the streams in the area through its drainage; rivers such as the Tomebamba, the Mazán, the Yanuncay and Migüir born in El Cajas and supply drinking water to the city of Cuenca; Its are, at the same time, major contributors of Paute Hydroelectric Complex, which provides electricity to most of the country.

On the heights of the Western Range of the Andes, west of the city of Cuenca, is El Cajas National Park, mainly formed by large elevations stored inside lake systems interconnected by way of huge boxes, is hence its name Cajas (Boxes). In the area there is not a marked regularity of climate; They are given frequent frosts and there permanent presence of showers (drizzle) and fog.

On the eastern edge of the park it erects a Rainforest Subalpine (SA-rf), mainly composed of tree and shrub species diversity of orchids, ferns and mosses. Stands the formation of forest Polylepis, qiwuña, "quinoa" or "árbol de papel", which has between 8 and 10 m high and it grows on the banks of lagoons or streams and rocky places and is the only species of tree above 4000 m. In the western boundary abound woodble species.

Are whitetail deer, spectacled bear, puma, ocelots, páramo deer, páramo rabbits and andean tapir. The most important birds are the caracara, the condor, the andean toucan, ducks and hummingbirds. The water mouse of Cajas is an endemic species of the park. Like the northern El Ángel Ecological Reserve, the lagoons in El Cajas are recognized and very popular for its trouts. Attractions:

Lagartococha Lagoon: On its shores there is camping and the place is very busy with sport fishing. Beside Lagartococha it lies the "Cave of the Deaths".

Avilahuayco: serves as a natural lookout or watchtower; the panorama offered from the summit is very attractive because from there are observed "the boxes" that dominate the whole area.

Loma de Tres Cruces: It is one of the highest parts of the park where is the water divide between those who go to the lies Amazon and advancing towards the Pacific. El García Moreno Road crosses there and tradition tells that owes its name to the many dead who sought the place overnight trip from the coast, but the intense cold of the night failed to see the sunrise.

Taitachungo Lagoon (Mamamag): Starting from La Toreadora are some trails that lead to it. From here it can follow a stretch of Ingañán or Inca Trail to the Luspa Cave. In Mamamag it found other traces of pre-Inca constructions represented by stone steps and foundation of any type of building, presumably rooms for the night; more than housing, these buildings seem to have served as inns, lodges trip, since the site is a key step towards the coast.

==== Cotopaxi National Park ====
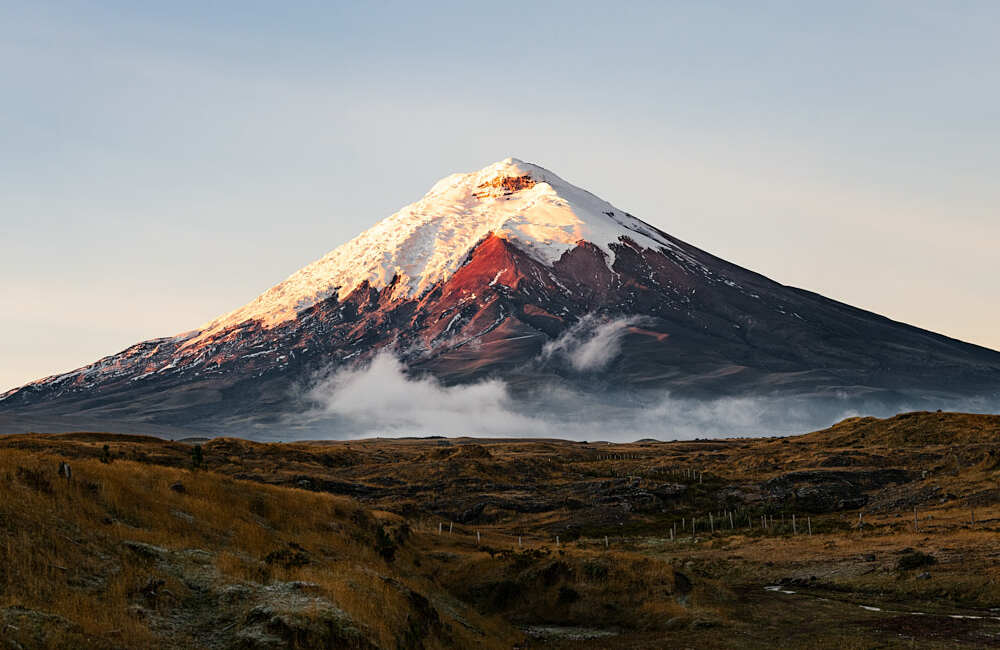
Historically famous Cotopaxi Volcano

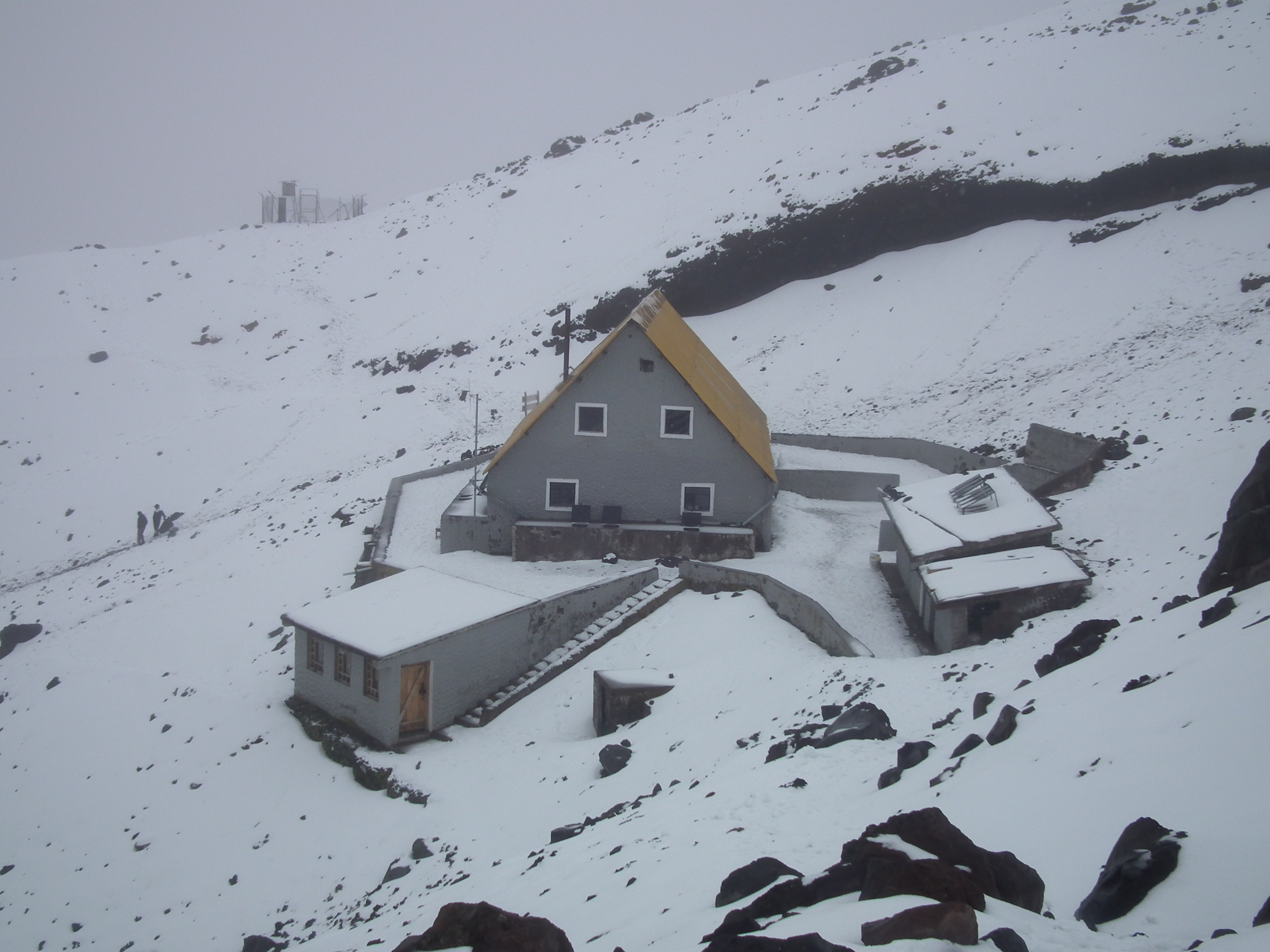
José Ribas Refuge in Cotopaxi National Park

Cotopaxi National Park is a protected area, located on the border of the provinces of Pichincha, Cotopaxi and Napo in Ecuador, which includes in its space Cotopaxi Volcano.

Its ecosystem hosts several arboreal species, especially pine, which turns the place into a unique site in South America because more reminiscent of an alpine forest than an Andean forest.

The park is connected to Quito by Pan-American Highway, four-lane, which allows travel from the city to the park in about an hour and a quarter. An alternative is the train, which also departs from Quito, and it takes an hour and a half to get to Park Station, another alternative would be entering the town of Machachi, addressing the neighborhood Santa Ana del Pedregal, where it can visit some inns.

It has an area of 3400–5897 masl. Its temperature ranges from 0 °C to 20 °C; with an annual average rainfall of 500–1500 mm.

There are many thick forests and the rest has been destroyed by fire or to plant grasses. There are extensive páramoland with páramo straw that is the dominant grass in the region as it ascends appear representative plants as chuquiraga, alchemilla, colonies of plants in the form of pads, mosses, lichens, romelio, quishuar or tree god, mortiño.

Fauna: wolves, pumas, bears, deer, rabbits, condors, wild horses and foxes. Geology: natural lagoons, trails, Cotopaxi snowy. Infrastructure: huts, high mountain center, camp center, community center, shelter for mountaineers. Archaeology: Ruins of citadel of the Puruhá. Astronomy: Center for Integrated Survey of Natural Resources by Remote Sensing (CLIRSEN)

==== Quilotoa Volcano ====
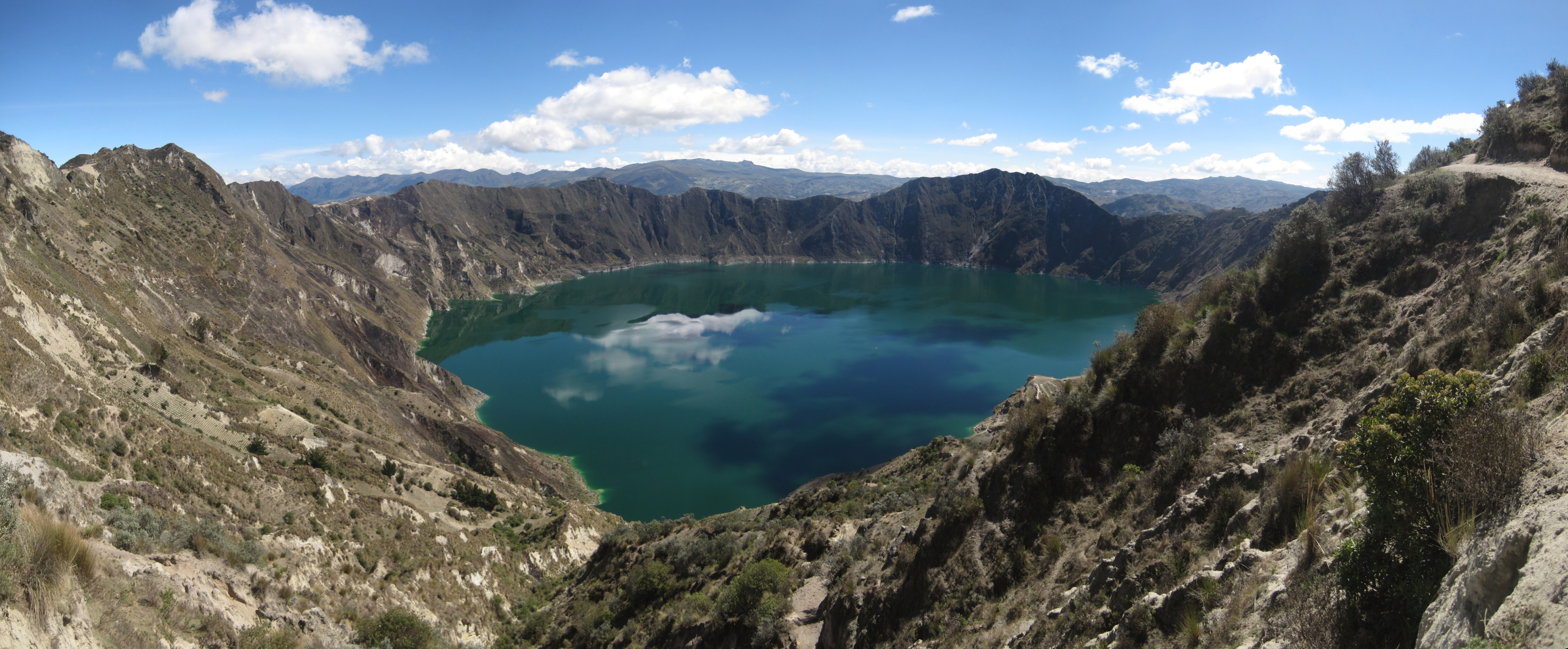
Quilotoa Crater

Quilotoa it is a water-filled boiler and the westernmost volcano in the Ecuadorian Andes. The 3-km-wide boiler was formed by the collapse of this dacite volcano following a catastrophic eruption 800 years ago, which produced pyroclastic flows and lahars that reached the Pacific Ocean, and spread in the air a deposit of volcanic ash along the northern Andes. The boiler has accumulated a depth of 250 m crater lake, which has a greenish color as a result of dissolved minerals. Vents are on the bottom of the lake and hot springs occur on the eastern flank of the volcano.

Quilotoa is an increasingly visited tourist site. The route of the "cumbre" (the small town of Quilotoa) is usually traveled in a hired truck or by bus from the town of Zumbahua 17 km south. Visitors must pay two dollars each to look from the edge of the boiler. A series of simple Hostels have developed in the immediate area, and offer services such as mules and guides to five-hour hike around the boiler (whose diameter is about 9 km), half hour hike down (and 02.01 hours walk back to the ascent of 400 vertical meters) and very basic accommodation in its bowl. Camping is permitted at the bottom of the crater, but no drinking water (except half-liter bottles sold at the lodge), and only one toilet well, located in the hostel.

==== Podocarpus National Park ====
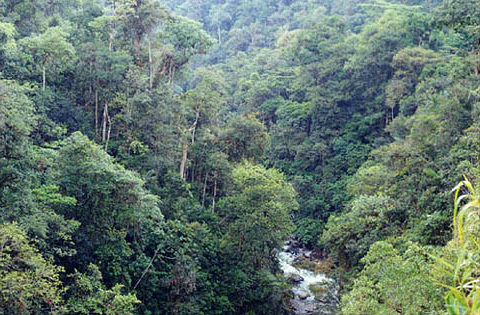
Forest surrounding the Bombuscaro river

The Podocarpus National Park is a National Park located in the provinces of Loja and Zamora Chinchipe, in the south east of Ecuador . It was established the December 15 of 1982. The park is an area of mega diversity and a high degree of endemism due to its location between diverse biological systems.

It extends over 146 280 [[km^{2}]]; in both foothills of the Eastern Range of the Andes until the basins of the rivers Nangaritza, Numbala and Loyola. About 85% of the park is in the province of Zamora Chinchipe and about 15% in the province of Loja.

The national park was established to protect the largest forest in romerillos in the country, consisting of three species of the genus Podocarpus the only conifer native of Ecuador.

Within the park it has developed a unique biological environment, especially represented by the only birds in the area. Podocarpus National Park is home to a complex of more than 100 lakes, one of the best known are the El Compadre Lagoon. There are also waterfalls, canyons and various kinds of mammals and plants.

To access the park there are two entrances main corresponding to its biogeographic zones, one is in the Cajanuma Sector 'in the upper biogeographic zone. The other is in the Bombuscaro Sector, corresponding to Bombuscaro river in the lower biogeographic zone. In addition, there are two alternative accesses in the high biogeographic zone of the province of Zamora Chinchipe, one is in the Romerillos Sector, corresponding to Jamboé river and other less known entering the Cerro Toledo from the Yangana-Valladolid route.

The park has an exceptional flora, it has been considered the Botanical Garden of America as it is located in the territory where overlap the centers of endemism in the northern Andes and Tumbes.

In its ecosystems of montane rain forests and lower montane, located in the Nudo de Sabanilla, as well as very wet montane and pre-montane forests in the basin Numbala river, there are over 4000 plant species among which stand trees that can measure up to 40 meters as the romerillo, which the park is named, and many other valuable as the cascarilla, called the national tree of Ecuador, and an so many varieties of orchids.

There are specific differences between the vegetation of the moors of the area and the north of the country, basically because they are lower, on the crests of the mountains and in the transition zone of a true moor that does not develop fully, because of the low-lying terrain. Among the main species found in the region are ragwort, laurel, Aguacolla, uvilla, black elderberry, pumamaqui, sapan, myrtle, cashoco, alder, acacia, sage, white guato, cedar, castor, walnut, yumbingue and sluice.

There are over 560 species of birds recorded in the park. This represents 40% of the birds of Ecuador and 6% of world birds. Therefore, it is noted as an important area for birds conservation. There are also 46 species of mammals including spectacled bear (Tremarctos ornatus), andean tapir (Tapirus pinchaque), common marsupial mouse (Caenolestes fuliginosus), smelly fox (striped hog-nosed skunk), dwarf deer (Pudu mephistophiles).

To visit this place there are four trails: Oso de Anteojos of 400 m with a moderate slope and easily accessible; the cloud forest, 750 m; El Mirador 1.5 km are medium level. Also being for day trips, the circuit I could continue down the path El Mirador with a distance of 3.5 km. To return to the refuge, but some parts of this trail are difficult, so it requires extra caution on the road. In addition, there are long trails where camping is necessary.

Loja is the closest city with airport, but Zamora is also nearby. Loja takes 25–40 minutes to reach to 3 of the 4 entrances, and two hours to reach the Vilcabamba entrance.

==== Mindo ====
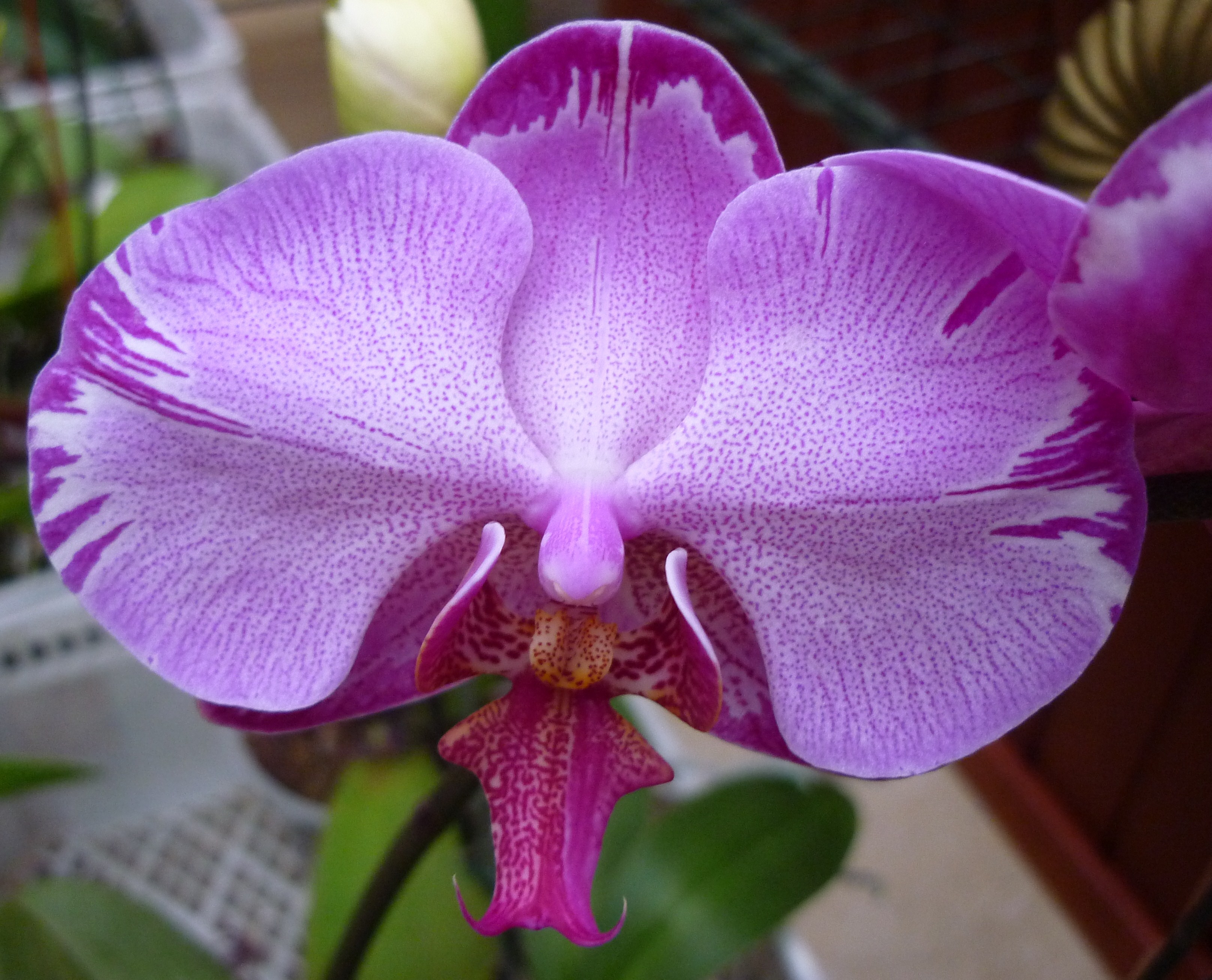

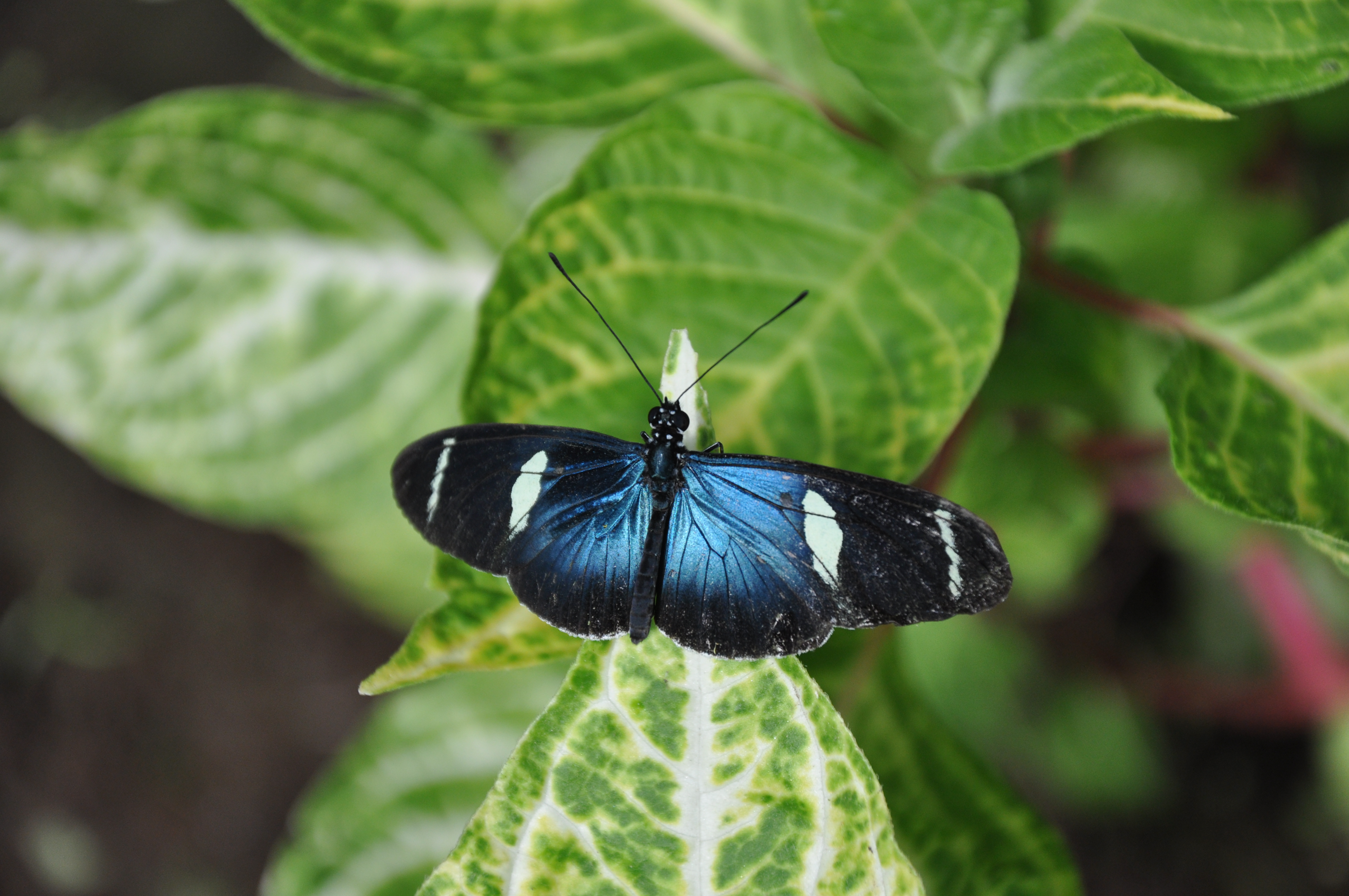

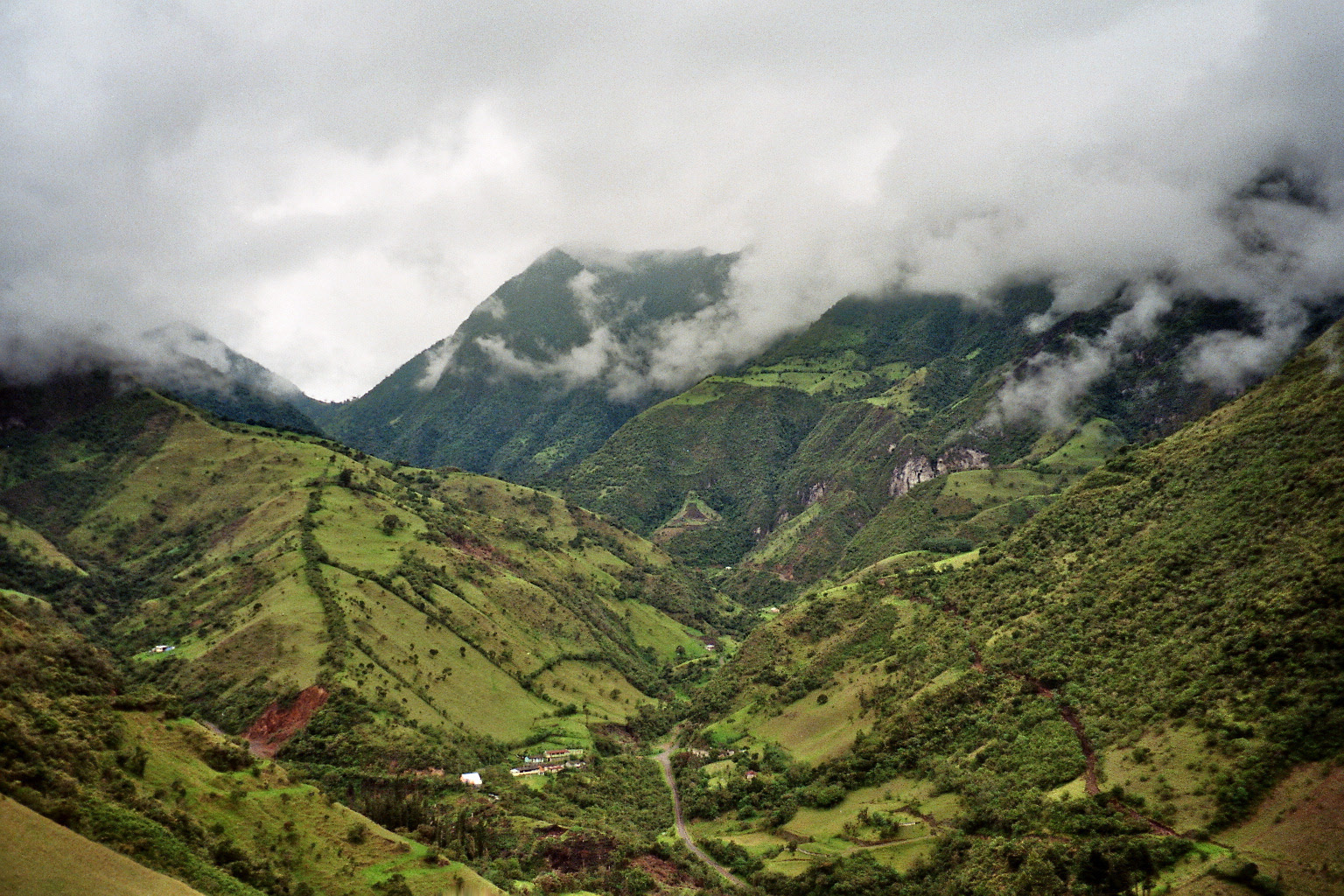
Mindo: The Country of the Birds

Mindo is a parish located in the north of Ecuador and one of the two Parish of San Miguel de Los Bancos canton in the province of Pichincha, about 80 km northwest of Quito.

The parish center is a small village located at 1250 m high, the region as a whole has about 2500 inhabitants engaged in livestock, agriculture, and tourism. The temperature in the area ranges between 15 °C - 24 °C throughout the year. The rains are common, but during the months of June to November the weather becomes drier.

Mindo is especially renowned for its natural environment that call for nature lovers attracted by its flora and fauna. It is located in a valley, of which some 19,000 hectares are protected in what is called the Bosque Protector Mindo Nambillo ecosystem in which live about 500 varieties of birds and 90 species of butterflies. Also in the reserve park of Mindo have been identified over 170 species of orchids and abundant bromeliads, heliconias, ferns, vines, mosses and lichens.

Between 2001 and 2002 Mindo was world player by the mobilization and protest activities of locals and environmentalists, within Ecuador and in various countries in Europe, USA, India and Australia, to prevent the construction of an oil pipeline by the OCP Ecuador SA now affecting the region since such activities were not successful Despite opposition from locals and environmentalists the pipeline was built and began operations in November 2003 and until 2010 carried approximately 375 million barrels of heavy oil of several oil companies that have activities in Ecuador as reported by the company mentioned.

=== Culture and history ===
==== Historic Center of Quito ====
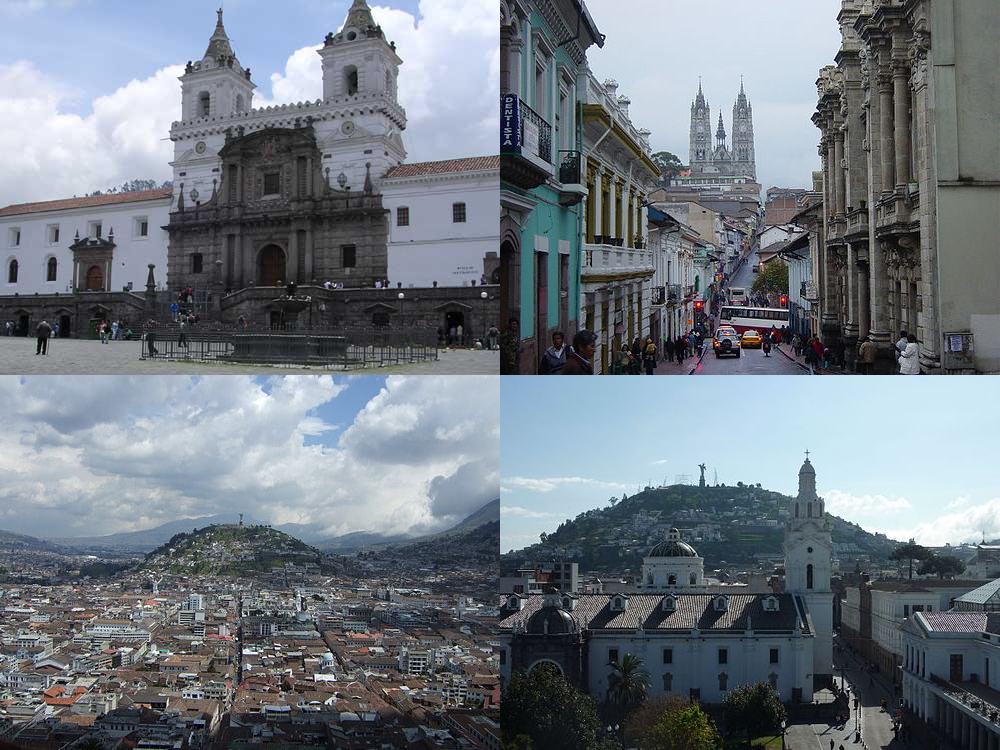
Images of Historic Center of Quito

San Francisco de Quito, is the city capital of the country and also of the province of Pichincha is also head of the metropolitan area that form, known as Metropolitan District of Quito

It is located on the basin of Guayllabamba on the eastern slopes of the stratovolcano active Pichincha, in the western part of the Andes. It is located approximately in the coordinates 0°11′S 78°29′W and its average altitude is 2850 m The city is divided into 32 parishes., Which are divided into sections

The date of his first foundation is uncertain; the oldest records are in the Inga estate, however, is used the Spanish conquest of the city, the 6 December 1534, as its birth

The modern structure mixes with the colonial where domestic residents and foreign visitors always find a place to work, enjoy and remember. In addition, the city is surrounded by volcanoes Pichincha, Antisana, Cotopaxi and Cayambe that make up the Andean contour majestic. Quito is full of meanings that identify and define, occupies hillsides or down to the valleys, winds through alleys and opens in wide avenues; zigzags, avoiding hills and ravines. For this physical beauty, its traditions, corners of mysticism and current legends, is considered "Reliquary of Art in America." These were the main features that in November 1978, Quito was declared by UNESCO "World Cultural Heritage".

In recent years tourism has grown tremendously in the city and has meant a new item in capital inflows. Most foreign visitors come from Quito belong to US and generally are young population, whose average age does not reach 28 years. Europeans also visit the city from Italy, France or Germany. A few years ago most tourists who stayed in city a few days they did because their main destination was the Galápagos Islands but now that has changed. Among the main annotations highlighting tourists are the kindness of the Quito people, the majesty of a full of snow-capped volcanoes landscape, and the cold wet mountain, which strange for foreigners because it is accompanied by a very low thermal sensation especially at night.

In the year 2008 Quito, it began in the travel section of the New York Times. This newspaper published the traditional list of 53 cities that Americans could visit, Quito for the first time was included. The website of the newspaper presented Quito as one of the best and most desirable tourist destinations in the world. "Tourism growth was 12% per annum, while the average before 2002 was of only 8%", says a publication of the Council. The capital lives its fiestas and heir to a rich history and culture, showing his legacy to those who travel.

Moreover, at the turn of Quito in the media, "Passport to Latin America with Samantha Brown" which premiered in the summer and continues into the air was perhaps the greatest achievement in television for the city. Samantha Brown told the Ecuador is "the perfect place to visit when it want to discover South America." The city also hosted a team of US channels CBS and NBC recently. Also it has received tremendously enthusiastic publications like Condé Nast Traveller, Frommer's 'Top Destinations for 2008', the Nexos magazine of the American Airlines, the Geographical magazine, the San Francisco Chronicle daily, and the German magazine Merian among others.

==== City Middle of the World ====
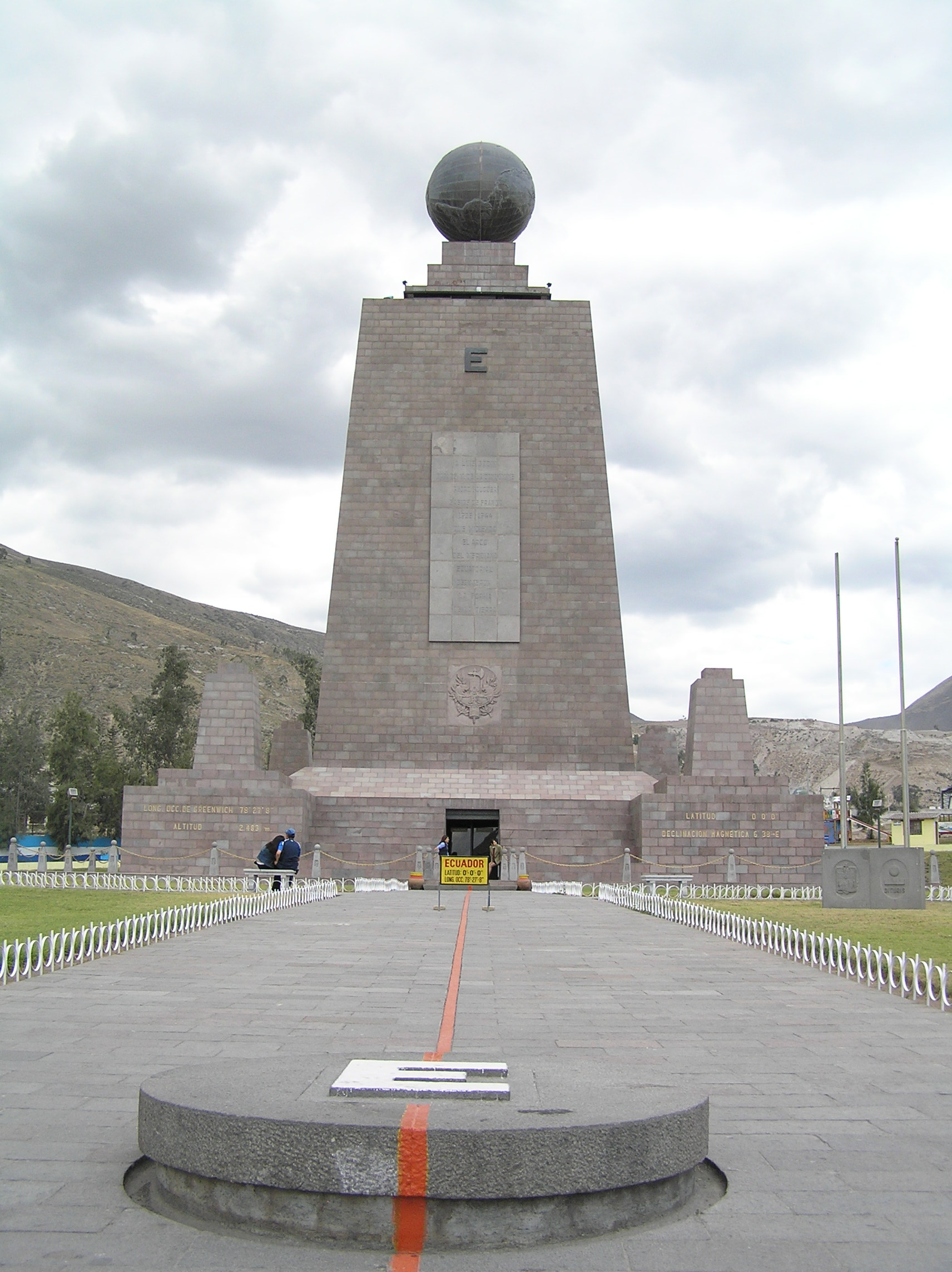
Monument to the Middle of the World

The Ciudad Mitad del Mundo is a land owned by the prefecture of the province of Pichincha, Ecuador. It is located in the parish of San Antonio of Quito Metropolitan District, north of downtown Quito.

In the field it built the headquarters of Union of South American Nations which is also the Ethnographic Museum Mitad del Mundo, a museum about the ethnography indigenous from Ecuador. Between 1979 and 1982 was built a monument of 30 meters high to mark the spot where it was believed that the equator facing the country at the time. In fact, a list was drawn from the center of the staircase leading to the east, across the square to mark the Ecuador.

But really the whole structure is 240 m south of the real equator, which was not located until recently, by the occurrence of GPS technology.

The pyramidal monument, with each side facing a cardinal direction, is topped by a globe of 4.5 m in diameter and 5 tons. Inside the monument there is a small museum that displays elements of indigenous culture of Ecuador, such as clothing, descriptions of the various ethnic groups, and samples of their activities. Mitad del Mundo has other attractions as a Planetarium, and in the Central Plaza are held several musical and cultural performances. A small town around the monument around the Ethnographic Museum acts as a tourist center, offering a replica of a Spanish colonial city called "Ciudad Mitad del Mundo".

==== Historical Center of Cuenca ====
Cuenca is a city of south central of the country, is the capital of province of Azuay and of the Región 6. Is located in the southern part of the Ecuadorian Andes. Its Historic Center was declared World Heritage by UNESCO in 1999. It is called the "Athens of Ecuador" for its majestic architecture, its cultural diversity, its contribution to the Ecuadorian arts, sciences and letters and for being the birthplace of many famous people of the Ecuadorian society. Handmade hats are a specialty in Ecuador and sold to tourists from around the world who visit Cuenca.

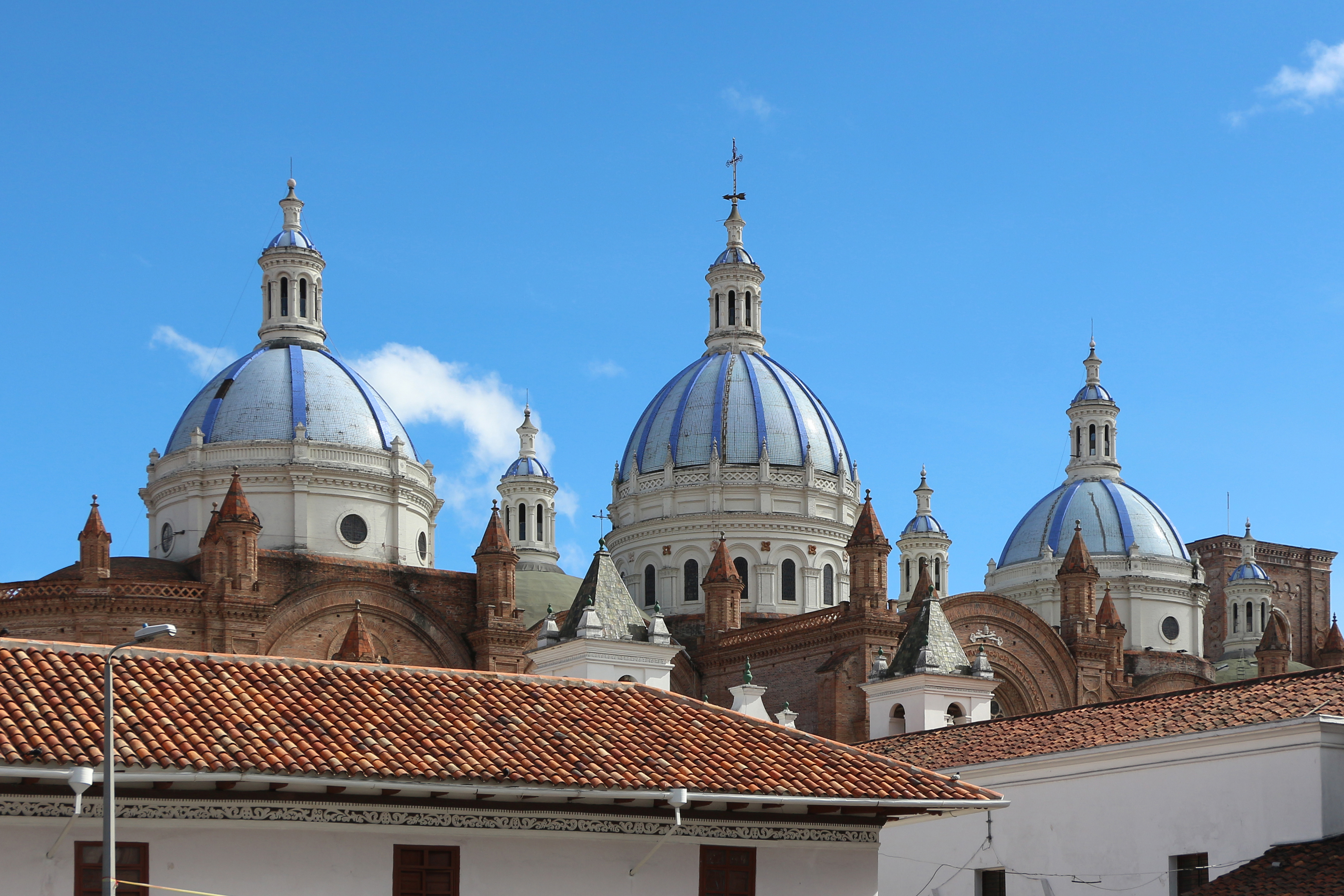
Domes of the Catedral Nueva in Cuenca.

In the center of the city are located important historical remains: museums and old churches (including the Cathedral of the Inmaculada Concepción, one of the largest of America, and others dating from the 16th and 17th centuries), paved streets and houses with facades of Republican style who point the different European influences with characteristic balconies and artistically carved ceilings and other forged in brass painted.

The city is also known as the "Cuenca of the Andes" or the "Athens of Ecuador" for being the birthplace of poets and illustrious men who have left high the name of this city, as Miguel Vélez, Gaspar Sangurima, Santo Hermano Miguel, Honorato Vázquez, Remigio Crespo Toral, among other characters as Abdón Calderón Garaicoa, Antonio Borrero. In Cuenca there are also many cultural organizations.

It also boasts a wide variety of cultural and traditional throughout the year as the fiesta of Corpus Christi which is held in June and the Feast of All Souls to be held in Ecuador at National level the November 2 and one festival with the festivities on November 3 during the holiday commemorating independence, also a sponsored by the City in a contest it choose to the "Chola cuencana" of the year who will chair the Foundation of the same name, entity that promotes various social projects in rural parishes. Another great festival tradition is the Pase del Niño Viajero that takes place on December 24 in the streets of the historic center (although many people also do so during the course of the months of December and January, arriving in sometimes until February), in which children dressed as characters from the Bible, pastors, overseers, cholas, gypsies, and others, through the streets, organized by families, educational communities, neighborhood, religious and parochial.

Cuenca has the thermal waters of Baños de Cuenca, with typical food, roasted guinea pig. For nightlife Calle larga has many bars, clubs, lodges and cybercafes. It is also advisable to visit the barranco (canyon) where it can appreciate the Tomebamba River, neighboring cantons as Chordeleg known for its jewelry, Gualaceo with its unique landscapes and delight its typical food, Girón with its waterfall.

==== Ingapirca archaeological complex ====
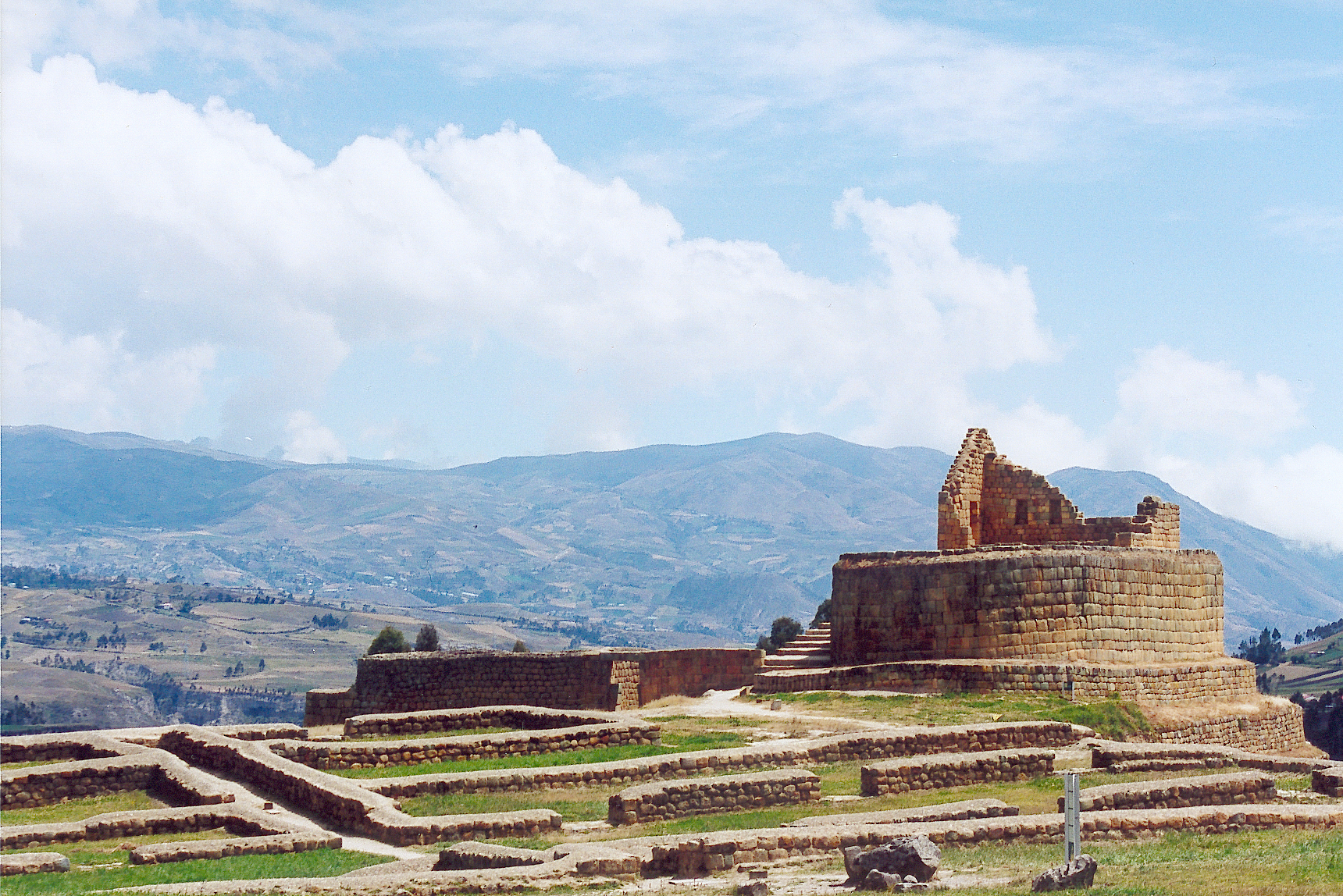
Ingapirca: "Temple of the Sun".

The fortress of Ingapirca is the most important archaeological construction of Ecuador, of Inca origin, is located in the province of Cañar, at 3,120 meters above sea level and 16 km from the Cañar city. It is an observatory of the sun and moon.

Ingapirka is a Quechua word which means Wall of the Inca. It is a truly Inca construction, even though this name was used to designate various pre-Hispanic ruins, without necessarily originate has to do with the Inca culture.

The ensemble of Ingapirca archaeological, is known since the mid-18th century, and the Cañar valley where are these sites, it was called in the 16th century as a province of Hatun Cañar (Quechua: Hatun Kañar ).

Fray Gaspar de Gallegos, parish priest of Sant Francisco Pueleusi of Azogue, wrote in 1582:

" It is generally called the cañares because three leguas from here's a town called Hatum Cañar that means in the Inca language" The largest province of the cañares "and there say that in time of the Inca Huayna Cápac were large populations of Indians and that there was the main head of these cañares, and it seems, because today there are large and very sumptuous buildings, among them a strong tower ... "

It is not known for certain what were the purposes for which it was built this building of origin Inca-Carari, the only criterion on which coincide several historians and archaeologists is that it was built under the exclusive orders of Huayna Cápac, during campaigns of conquest that her father Túpac Yupanqui, began years ago, to the territories that now comprise southern Ecuador.

Apparently it played a major role in the Inca military strategies, as outpost and supply of troops to the north of Ecuador, but his most important goal was that of being a place of worship and veneration of the sun, the most Inca God, thus becoming in a Coricancha, dedicated to Inca ritual.

Guayaquil

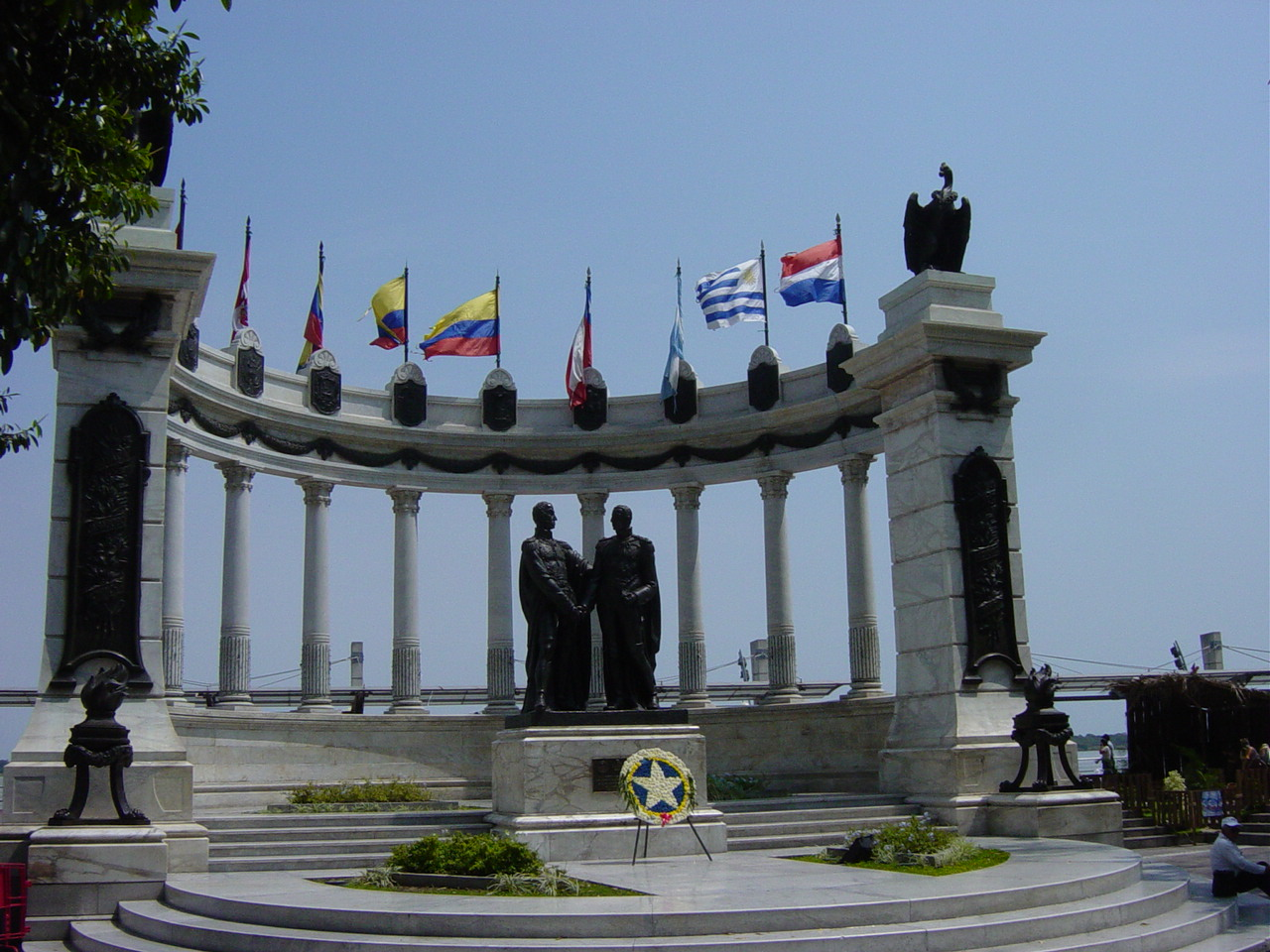
La Rotonda Malecón de Guayaquil

Despite being a predominantly commercial and business city in the country, it also has well known featured tourist places not only for Ecuador but also for South America, these places are the El Malecón 2000 and the biggest park of Ecuador, the Sports and Ecological Parque Samanes of Guayaquil

==== Historic center of Loja ====
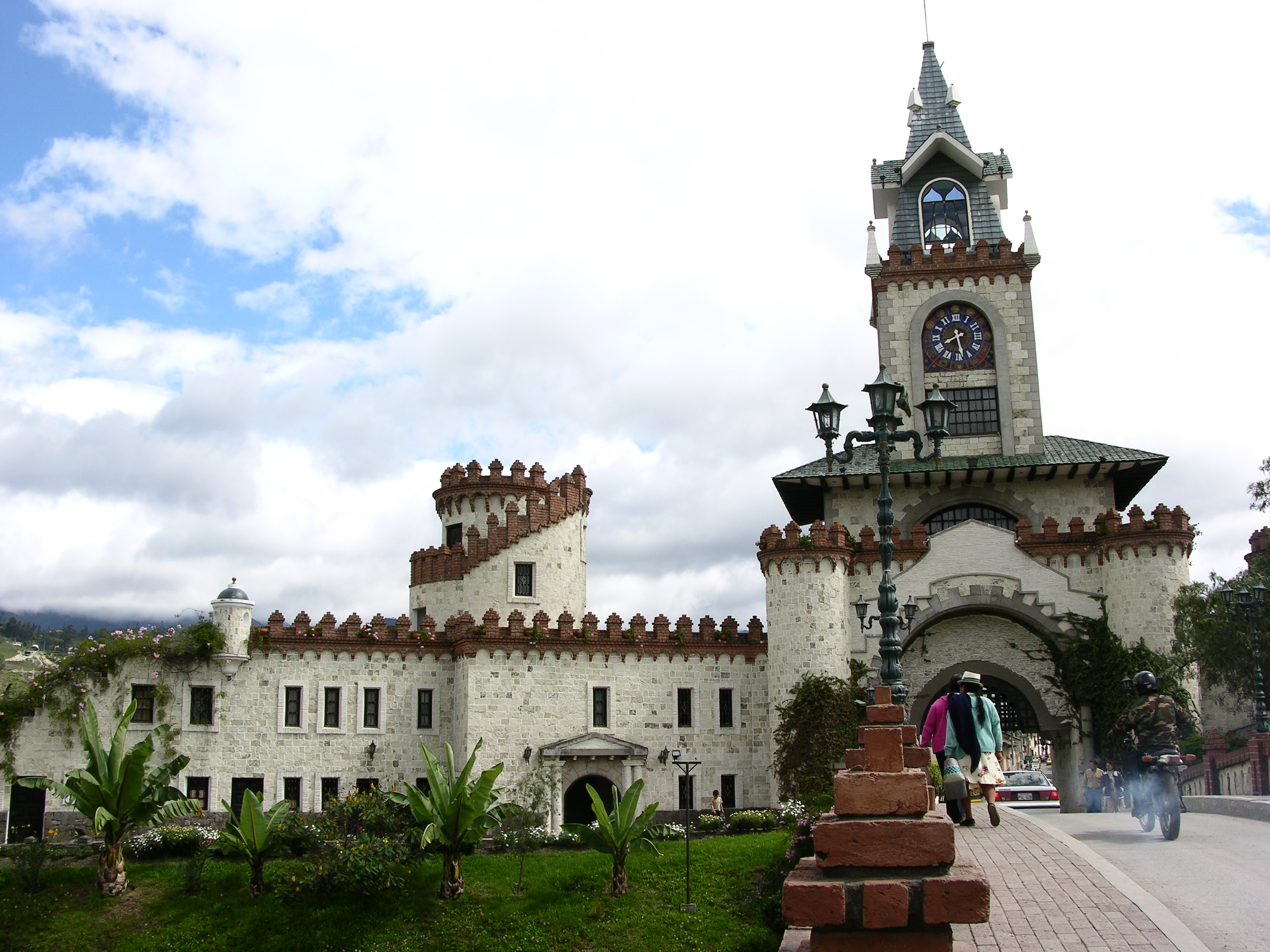
City entrance of Loja

Loja, located in the eastern part of the province of Loja, in the south of the country. Is the Capital of province and Canton counterparts. Loja has a rich tradition in the arts, and for this reason is known as the Musical and Cultural Capital of Ecuador. The city is home to two major universities: the National University of Loja, founded in 1859 by the Federal Government of Loja is the oldest university in functions in the country after the Central University of Ecuador (Quito) HISTORIA UNIVERSIDAD NACIONAL DE LOJA, and the Technical University of Loja, founded in 1971, is the third in university population Universidad Técnica Particular de Loja - universidades ecuatorianas segun numero de estudiantes.

The city has great touristic interest because of its art and culture, which can be felt mainly in its Historic Center, knowing that also is surrounded by towns with rich tradition as Saraguro and Vilcabamba. That is why it is ranked as one of the main tourist destinations by Ecuadorians and Peruvians, for it has hotel infrastructure that every major city needs for its visitors, being the third city with the highest number of luxury hotels and hostels around Ecuador after Quito and Guayaquil.

- Museum of the Central Bank

Located in the historic center of the city of Loja, near the central square, is the Museum of the Central Bank. It contains the archaeological, historical and colonial history of the province and the city of Loja. There are seven rooms of the museum, every detail a different aspect of the area: the lobby, archeology, nature, the colonial period, the 19th century, important people of Loja, and arts and crafts.

- Conceptas Mothers Museum

This is in a 17th-century convent, belonging to the colonial era. The museum contains pictures, household utensils, and tools used by the nuns of self-flagellation. It also houses a collection of works of colonial religious art.

- Archaeological Museum

Opened in 2004, the Archaeological Museum houses some 1,600 artifacts, many of which are from the pre-Columbian period. There are three floors of the museum, organized by age of the artifacts. On the first floor Paleolithic and Neolithic artifacts and remains of the Valdivia culture. The second floor contains la Tolita artifacts, Jamás Coaque, Bahía and Guajala cultures. The third floor exhibits items of the Carchi, Imbabura, Panzaleo, Puruhuá, Casholoma, Tacalshapa, Manteña, Late, Milagro, Quevedo, Huancavilca, and Inca cultures.

- Music Museum of Pío Jaramillo Alvarado Cultural Center

Located at Bernardo Valdivieso street, in the Historic Center, opened in 2004, the museum houses exhibitions about the musical history of composers and of Loja, from Renaissance to avant-garde. The collection spans almost 200 years of history, with more than 7,000 musical scores and 65 instruments on display.

- Matilde Hidalgo de Procel Museum

The museum, on the main floor of the building of the Provincial Government of Loja, houses of artifacts of the life of Matilde Hidalgo, the first woman to become a medical doctor in Ecuador, and also the first woman to vote in Latin America.

- City Entrance

City Entrance, model of Coat of Arms of the city, presented by King Philip II of Spain in 1571. The City Entrance is located at Av. Gran Colombia, it has a museum where exhibits galleries showing works of Lojan contemporary art, a cafe, gift shop. Views of the city center are possible from the clock tower.

Loja contains a number of historic churches, board of city of tourism has led to the search for a new way. Starting at the City Entrance, one of the first things a visitor will notice is a large orange stripe painted on the sidewalk. Following the band takes the person on a self-guided tour of the main churches, historical areas and of Loja.

- Cathedral

The main cathedral, a masterpiece in the colonial style, is located in the central plaza. It is home to the Virgin of the Swan during his two-month stay in the city of Loja. Original of adobe its first building dates from the 1500s, the current building dates from 1838 (earlier buildings were lost due to earthquakes) The Cathedral is one of the largest churches in Ecuador. It is also the headquarters of the Diocese of Loja.

- Church of San Francisco

The small church of San Francisco, a houses Franciscan convent of the city. The church was built in 1548 and rebuilt in 1851. The square, located in the historic center, has a monument to Alonso de Mercadillo, founder of the city.

- Church of Santo Domingo

The Church of Santo Domingo was built in 1557, the entire building was once in the Gothic style, but after an earthquake in 1867, only the twin towers remained standing. The church was refinished in the colonial style, but the needles were left as a reminder of the old facade. The church was painted and decorated by Lojan Fray Enrique Mideros. In the church square there is a monument to Manuel Carrión Pinzano, founder in 1853 of the movement of federalism in Loja.

- Church of San Sebastián

In 1660, the city of Loja, was devoted to Saint Sebastian in order to avoid destruction by earthquakes. The present church dates from 1900. Perhaps the most remarkable monument of Loja is located in the Plaza de San Sebastián (also called Independencia Square) - 32 meters clock tower commemorates the declaration of independence from the Spanish crown the November 18, 1820. The tower has four faces, with bronze reliefs depicting scenes from the history of the city.

- The Valleys

Loja is an ideal city to get its surrounding places like the Valley of Malacatos and Vilcabamba and 30 km south of the city. The latter place is world-renowned for harboring people that exceed one hundred years easily. Catamayo Valley at a 20-minute drive west of the city is very busy as this place is the Camilo Ponce Enríquez Airport and also many watering places. A 60 km east of the lojan capital is Zamora, a paradise full of waterfalls, watering places, etc. Also within an hour's drive towards the north of Loja is Saraguro it is one of the few places in the world where its Inca customs remain intact.

==== Latacunga ====
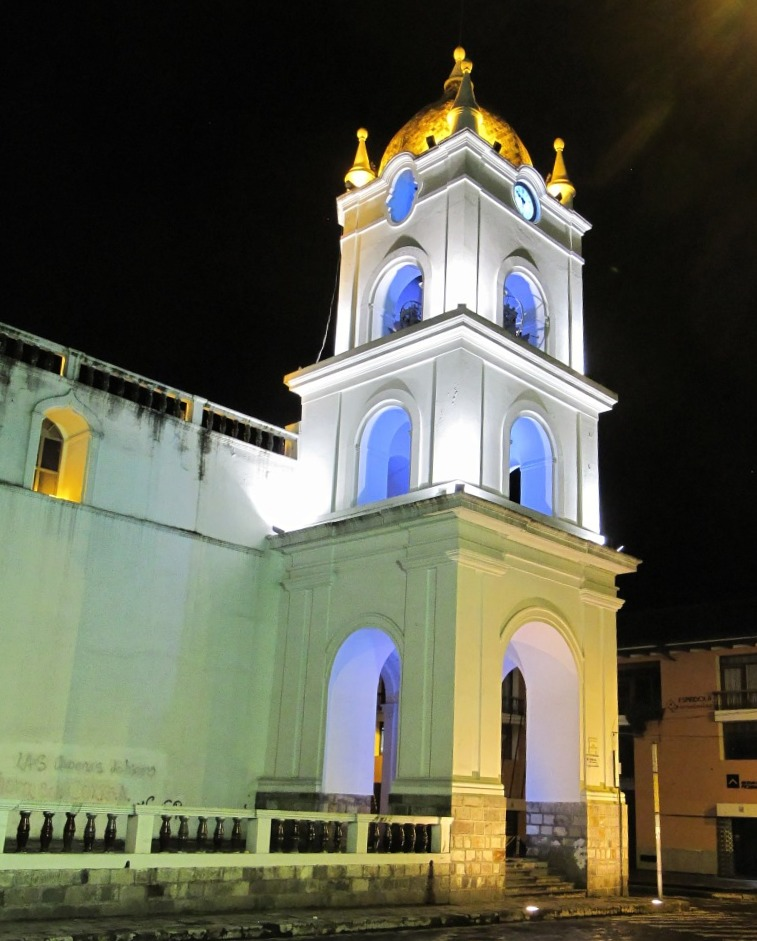
Cathedral of Latacunga

Latacunga is the capital of the province of Cotopaxi and cantonal head of the homonymous canton. It is located in the central highlands of the country, in the foothills of the mountains of the Andes of Ecuador, near the Volcano Cotopaxi in the basin Patate. It is located at 2750 meters above sea level and has an average temperature of 12 degrees Celsius.

The city of Latacunga offers multiple destinations of various types (nature, culture, gastronomy, history, etc.), within the city and its surroundings.

- Cathedral Construction began in the mid-17th century with a large ship and cruise with octagonal dome is of Romanesque style. In the late 19th century it built tower of Romanesque arches and Islamic shot. In its altar of pumice it appreciate pieces of colonial imagery. It is in the streets: Quito and General Maldonado.
- Church of El Salto: Has a nave and twin towers, seated from north to south, it was made in the late 19th. It is located between the streets: Juan Abel Echeverría and Antonio Clavijo, next to the Plaza de El Salto.
- Church of La Merced: It started as a chapel in 1640, it is built on a Latin cross plan, of a nave with two cruisers, highlights an artistic dome. In 1949, by the earthquake in Amabato, the tower fell on the front door, being rebuilt, but lost its original structure. It is located between the streets: Juan Abel Echeverría, and Quijano y Ordóñez.
- Church of San Agustín: In neoclassical influence shows circular columns with Ionic capitals with its finished in cornice. Pumice is used to report quickly to the pillars that support the arches on both floors. In 1820, the monastery was occupied by Spanish military, serving as headquarters for a fraction of the Batallón "Los Andes". It is between the streets and Hermanas Páez and Quito.
- Church of San Francisco: Its construction began in 1600 and ended in 1693, but in 1698 the church was left in ruins by the earthquake. It is located at street General Manuel Maldonado and Quijano y Ordóñez.
- 'Church of San Sebastián:' is located at Josefa Calixto, between Juan Abel Echeverría and Isla San Bartolomé.
- 'Church of San Felipe'
- 'Church of Santo Domingo'
- 'Mills of Monserrat' : built in 1756, as a colonial textile mill, now a multi-cultural center, in its facilities is the Archaeological Museum (with pre-Incan cultural relics), the Folk Museum (clothing, tools and sets referring to various manifestations of popular culture). And the installation of the gallery with works of Tabara, Guerrero, Guayasamín, Román
- Municipal palace: official building, town hall, built between 1910 and 1936 in pumice with Doric and Corinthian influence elements with wall decorations that reflect patriotic events.
- 'House of the Marquis of Miraflores' : built in the first half of the 18th century, among its several owners highlights the latacungan Ignacio Flores, Marquis of Miraflores and President of the Real Audiencia of Charcas (now Bolivia) in 1782. In its construction are appreciated stone carved in pumice with Mudéjar arches and arabesques. At present works the Department of Culture and Public Relations of the Cabildo, small folk, civic and historical museums and library "Simón Bolívar".
- Ranch of Tilipulo: Originally built as a community operating worker in 1540. Today it is an architectural installation with religious influences that summarizing various aspects of local history.

===== Fiesta of la Mama Negra =====
This party has carried out in late September, the days 23 and 24, day of the autumn equinox, and that the Catholic Church commemorates the Virgin of Mercy; also it is celebrated by the festival of independence of the city, the November 11. It is a religious syncretism that has much color and joy as well as commotion, as thousands of domestic and foreign tourists attend this large festival not only to enjoy the music, costumes and dancing groups, but also the plentiful liquor. Despite this detail, the fiesta lives as pure representation of national folklore.

Latacunga, city embedded in the middle of the Ecuadorian Andes in South America, holds within it a unique socio-cultural and folk manifestation, the Comparsa de la Mama Negra, also called the Holy Tragedy or the Fiesta of the captaincy.

Its origin is lost in history, in a mixture of mestizo popular demonstrations: pagan and religious, Indigenous, African and Spanish; the same as its characters, rituals, costumes, music and dance bring life and endures over time such unique expression of the feelings of the people, retraced every year since the 17th century. In the 21st century it is a celebration in which homage to the Virgin of Mercy who granted according to tradition gratitude and recognition for protection in one of the eruptions of the world's highest active volcano, Cotopaxi.

On October 31, 2005, the National Institute of Cultural Heritage agreed to "declare as property belonging to the Intangible Cultural Heritage, the fiesta of la Mama Negra or fiesta of the Captaincy."

=== Beaches ===
==== Salinas ====
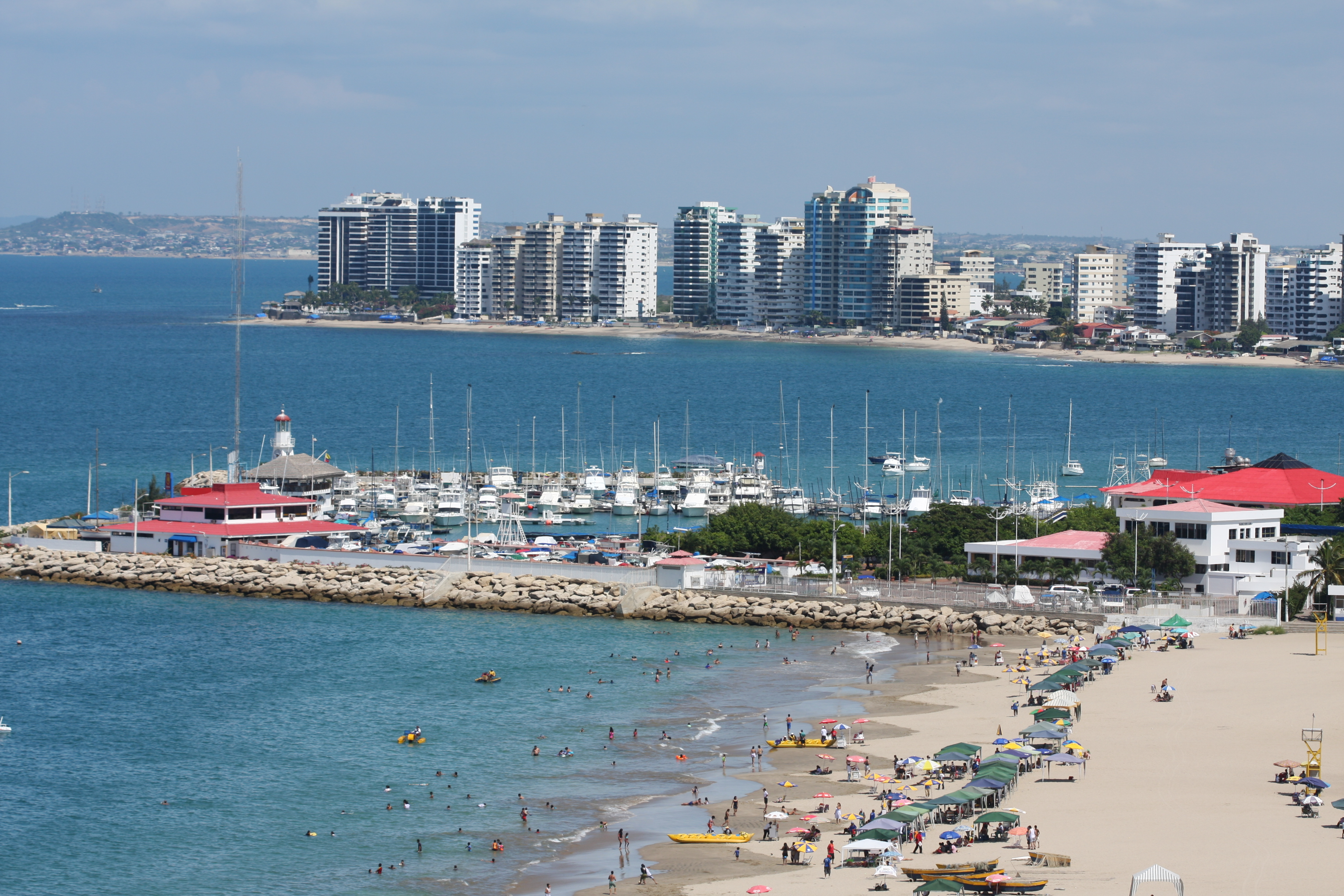
Chipipe Beach

Salinas it is a city of Province of Santa Elena. It is the cantonal head of Salinas Canton. It has a population of 34 719 inhabitants and its urban area is divided in 4 parishes. It is located at the western end of the province and the mainland of the country; part of the urban area of sprig of Santa Elena, along with La Libertad, Santa Helena, José Luis Tamayo and Ballenita.

The city is considered the most important, popular and visited resort of Ecuador, for its beaches, upscale hotels, clubs, bars, discos and sports centers for the tourist. Among the tourist attractions in Salinas are:

- Chipipe Beach: This is the widest, known and safe beach of the area, has few waves so it is recommended for children and inexperienced people. The calm blue waters, the birds, the beach and beside tall buildings make for a very attractive landscape. In the middle of the beach is the "Salinas Yacht Club".
- San Lorenzo Beach: This beach offers big waves, making it ideal for the surf. Here are a variety of crafts and fishing. On this beach there are numerous crabs, when approaching a person, hiding in holes in the sand make by themselves.
- Mar Bravo Beach: In this beach is forbidden to swim because the water is very dangerous. The sunsets are the main attraction of the place.
- La Chocolatera: Located at the Naval Base of Salinas. It is the western end of the town, the cantón, the province and the mainland of the country; it is also the second most westerly point of South America. It is called Chocolatera by the ways that the waves crash in existing caves, forming foam and steam like a cup of chocolate. It has a colony of 20 sea lions and a lighthouse.
- The Ecuasal Pools: It are salt wells that give the name to the city of Salinas. Here it can observe the process of extraction of salt and 116 species of native birds, some migratory.

==== Atacames ====
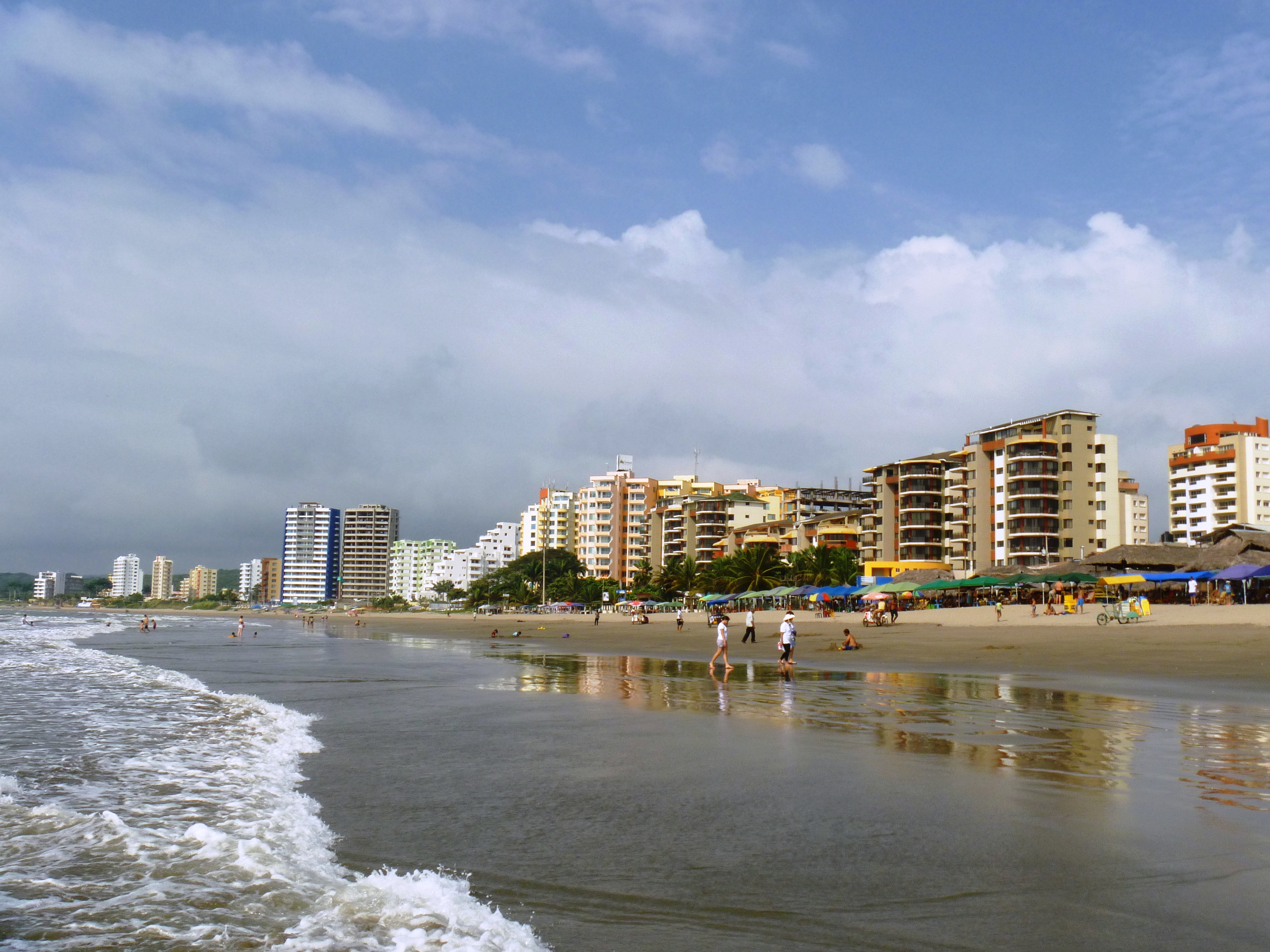
Tonsupa, parish of the Atacames canton.

Atacames is the largest natural beach of Ecuador and the nearest of Quito; so most of the inhabitants of this city makes this resort one of the most visited and popular in the country.

Atacames and surroundings feature to tourist spacious strips of gray sand beach, several kilometers long at low tide, allowing a nice atmosphere for sand or water sports, especially the surf.

Excursions to nearby places are also very popular among tourists. It highlights the watching of humpback whales during the summer months, and visiting forests and mangroves. The Island of Los Pájaros is a paradise for bird lovers as these animals are found in the wild. Near Súa it can see a small zoo with local animal species, and the Atacama people themselves are a small museum and an aquarium. The marine aquarium La vida del mar, located on the boardwalk in the cantonal head, showing various own species of Ecuador's continental shelf.

Tonsupa, with its modern and elegant tourist residence towers, and several first-class hotels as Makana Resort, is a destination that has taken off in the last decade between the upper middle class and upper of north of the range, especially Quito. Similarly Same, where it is the exclusive Club CasaBlanca, which gives the beach landscape of the parish a picturesque Mediterranean style.

To get to Atacames can be accessed by modern highway Autopista del Sol, Esmeraldas stretch, which connects with the road to Quito. An interesting feature for tourists is to use the motorcycle taxis as a means of transport to travel between regions.

In gastronomy include seafood and marine products in general. Very popular are the encocado de pescado, ceviche of shrimp, the traditional ceviche de concha and the corvina apanada, as well as innumerable buffet of dishes made with products of the sector.

==== Manta ====
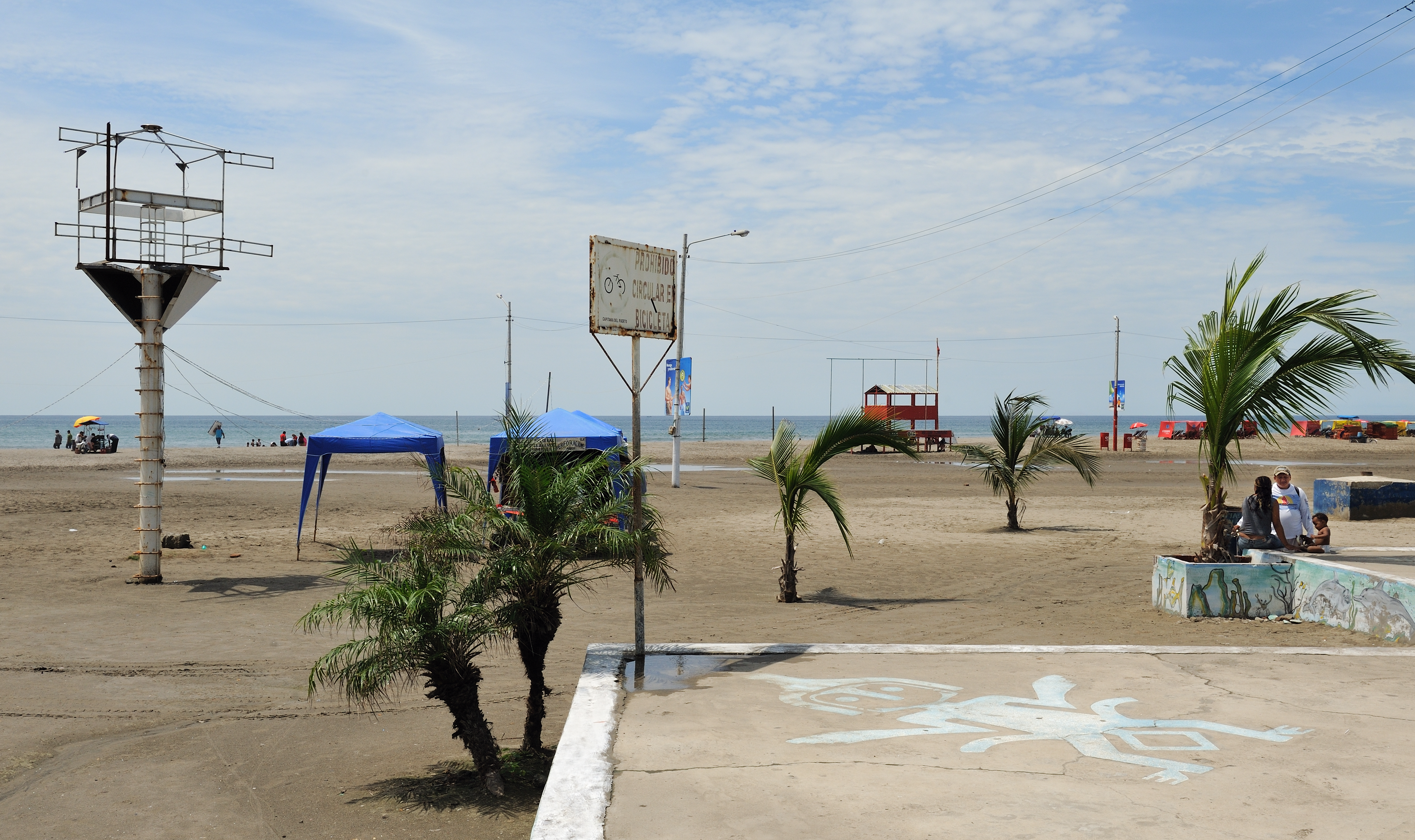
El Murciélago Beach

Manta is visited annually by both foreign and domestic tourists. Its beaches include "Los Esteros", "Tarqui", "El Murciélago", "Barbasquillo", "San Lorenzo" y "Santa Marianita", "Liguiqui", "La Tiñosa" and "Piedra Larga".

Manta is known in Ecuador for the nightlife of the seawalls of El Murciélago and Tarqui and most of all the "pink zone" (zona rosa) as it is known on the street "Flavio Reyes" and also at the site of recent and growing movement " Plaza del Sol "; in all these places are many restaurants and various places of entertainment such as karaoke, discos and casinos.

It highlights the kindness and hospitality of its people, which makes this Cantón of the province of Manabí is preferred by both local and foreign. manta is known as one of the main ports of passing cruise in the South American coast.

The Eloy Alfaro International Airport joins Manta with Quito and Guayaquil.

==== Bahía de Caráquez ====
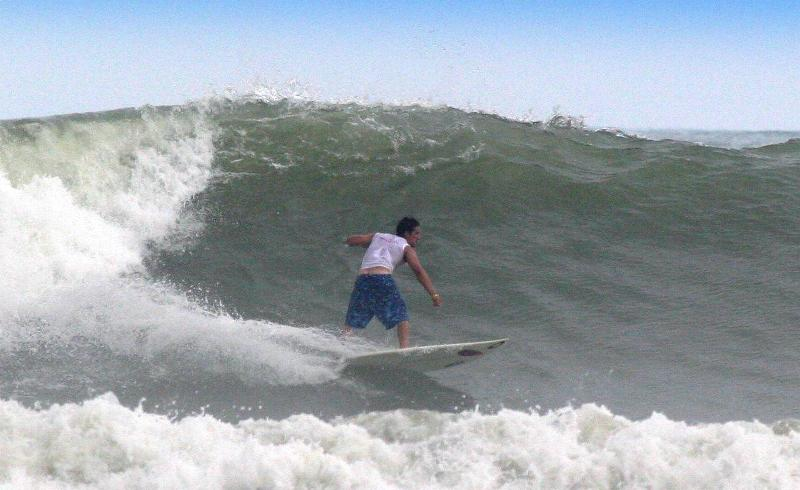
Surfing on the beaches of Bahía de Caráquez ("La Bellaca" Tip)

It is a city of coastal geographical region belonging to the canton Sucre, in the jurisdiction of the province of Manabí. It is located at the mouth of Chone River, and has considerable tourist infrastructure that places like cantonal head. The city is located about an hour north of the city of Manta and in the pre-Columbian era hosted the ancient Indian city Carán. Across the bay is the town of San Vicente. This trip is very picturesque and can be performed either in a canoe passenger, in a barge or in the bridge linking the two populations. Bahía is a tourist place, crime is minimal. Bahía is one of the most exclusive beaches of Ecuador. Many people, especially from the capital city, Quito, vacationing there.

Currently Bahía de Caráquez has become an anchorage of international sailing, that for safety, tranquility and tourist facilities found in this city an ideal spot for relaxation. The bay by have calm waters is used for water sports. It is also a city with nearby beaches as Canoa and La Bellaca, which are visited by surfers.

The climate of Bahía de Caráquez is spring all year, its temperature fluctuates between 24 and 30 °C.

==== Esmeraldas ====
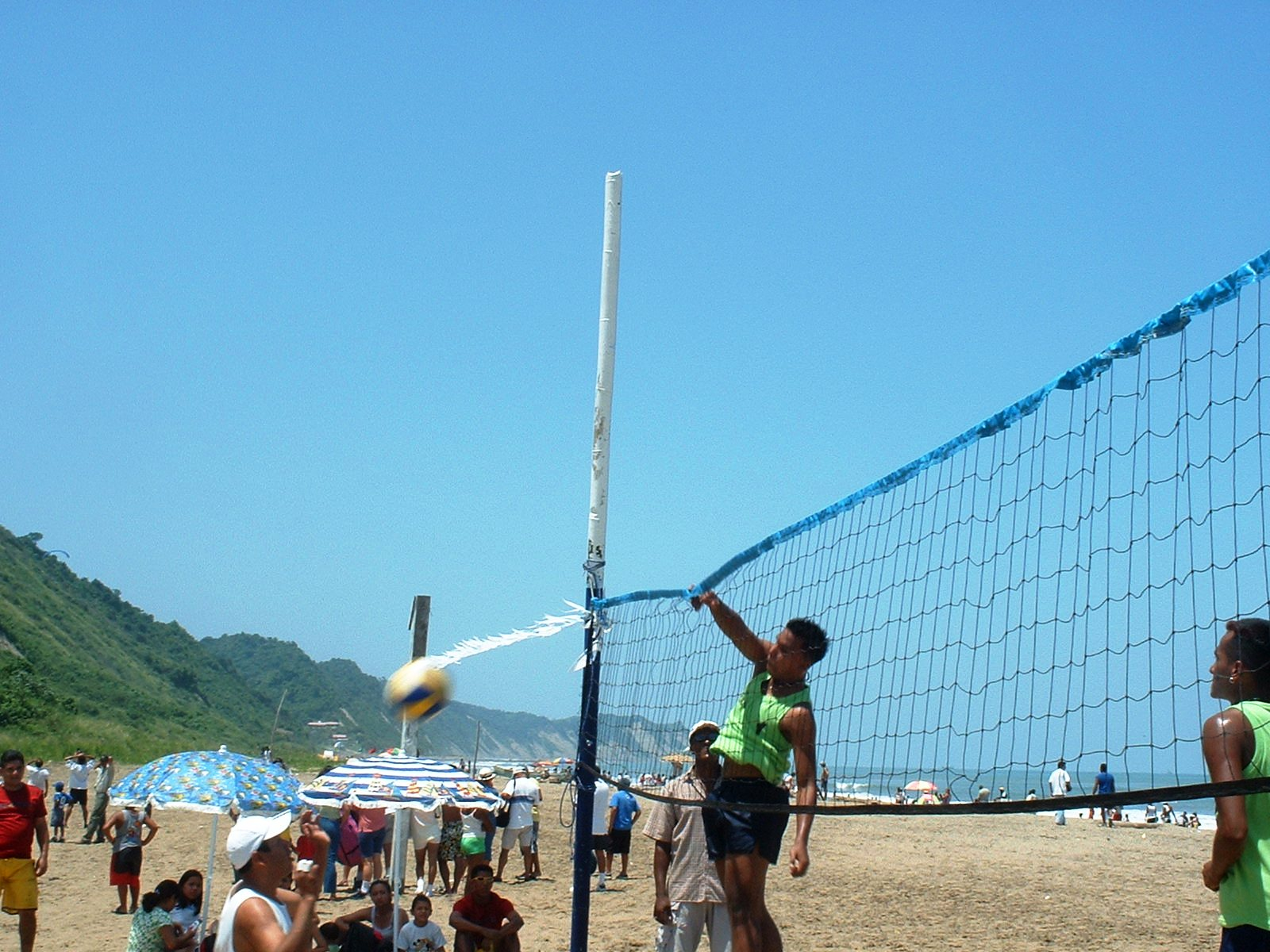
Summer Fun at Las Palmas beach

Esmeraldas is a capital city of Province of Esmeraldas, in northwestern Ecuadorian territory to 318 km of Quito. The beach of the town of Esmeraldas has weekends with culinary attention, and nightlife.

Beaches, Virgin Forests, Indigenous Cayapas, Marimba and afro-Ecuadorian dance, archaeological site La Tolita, Islands, flora and fauna.

Near this small city bordered on the north by the Colombian border and west to the Pacific Ocean, there are beaches that no further than 30 km away and it have the hotel infrastructure meeting the demanding tastes of tourists. To the southwest, 11 km, Same rises amidst palm trees and clear waters.

To the palate it test the "encocado de pescado", prepared with coconut juice, popular with residents and travelers. Other typical dishes are the tapao, based on fish and plantains, patacones, empanadas, bolas and bolones de verde, also with plantains as base.

==== Playas ====
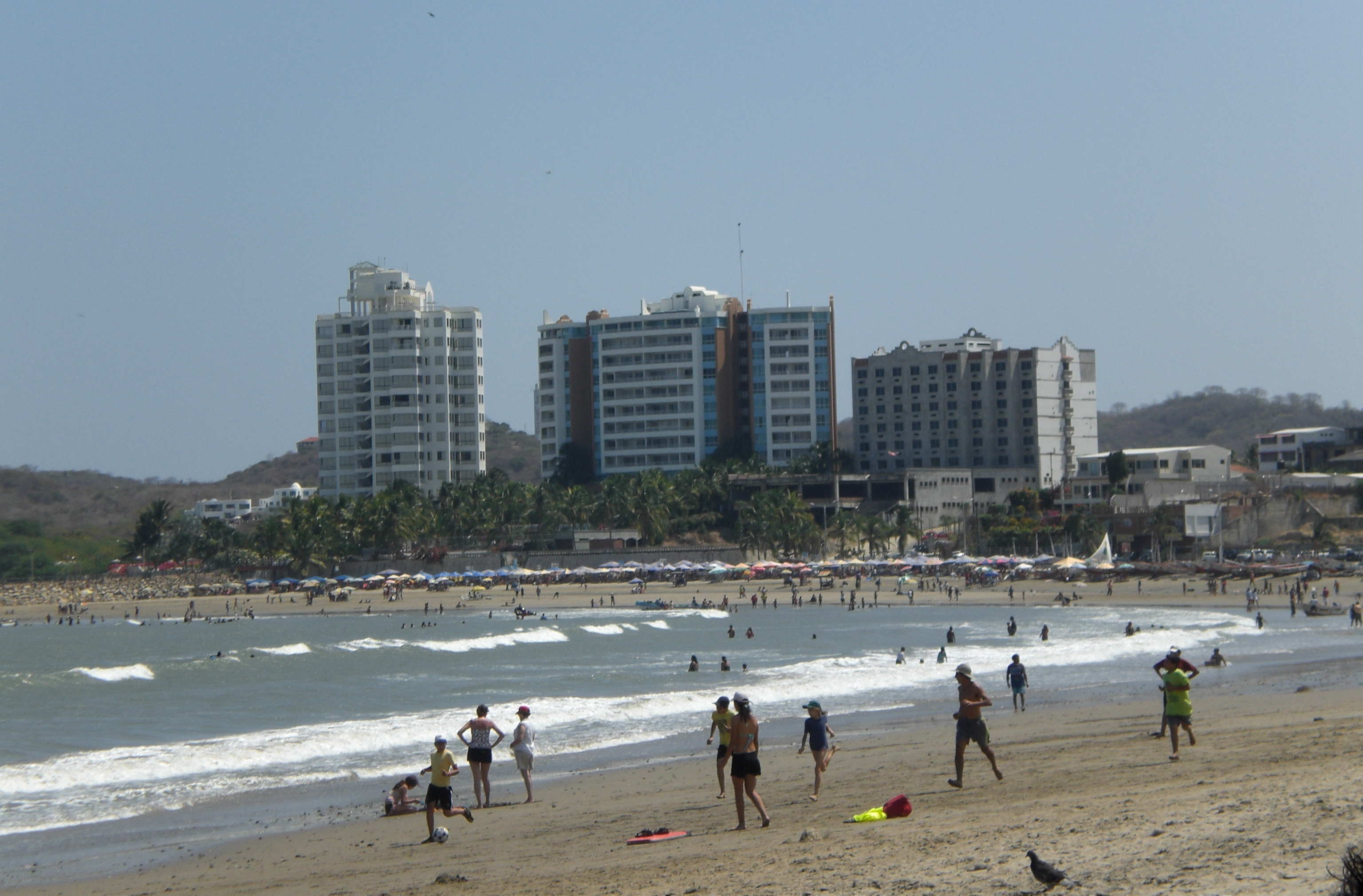
View of the beach town

Playas, is a city of province of Guayas, located in the southwest of the country, along the Pacific Ocean, about 96 kilometers city of Guayaquil. Its population is 34.409 inhabitants until the year (2010), although this rises to winter by the presence of tourists, because of its condition of resort. It is the cantonal head of Canton Playas.

Since its founding, Playas was an important port for fishermen, condition that continues to this day. At the beginning of the 20th century, investing of people with some political power of Guayaquil, it launched the project of converting Playas in a resort. For 1910, Playas was incorporated as parish and finally in 1989 reached its separation of the canton Guayaquil and cantonization.

After the creation of the province of Santa Elena in 2007, the city of Playas was established as the only resort of the province of Guayas, which provided a better investment on this city as a tourist infrastructure.

Undoubtedly the best attractions are its long beaches, which have an excellent hotel infrastructure and services that make pleasant the visit and stay of thousands of Ecuadorian and foreign tourists, who every week visit this city.

- Playa Rosada, located near the lighthouse, is a peaceful place for bathers and especially for excursions.
- Qatari can also go to visit the Shrine of Our Lady of the Rock (Santuario de la Virgen de la Roca).
- Near Casa Blanca club, it can see pelicans and other birds in the sector.
- Punta El Pelado, on the road to the site Engabao, is a pleasant and quiet ideal beach for hiking and camping with delicious local food.
- The horse riding for its beaches is one of its main attractions.
- The house of don Víctor Estrada is a true relic of the historical and cultural past.

The cuisine of Playas offers a wide variety of seafood delicacies that attract visitors to the region. Among the most desired are a good range of ceviches, of lobster, shrimp, shell, fish, octopus or mixed; seafood rice, whole fish to coal, jugged albacore, roasted oyster and ostrich burgers are also signature dishes.

== See also ==
- Pueblos Mágicos (Ecuador)
