= Pablo Fajardo =

Ecuadorian lawyer and activist

Pablo Fajardo in conversation with Silver Donald Cameron about his work.

Pablo Fajardo Mendoza (or Pablo Fajardo) is an Ecuadorian lawyer and activist. He led the litigation against Chevron Corporation related to the environmental disaster he alleged was caused by the oil operations of Texaco (acquired by Chevron Corporation in 2001) in the Lago Agrio oil field between 1964 and 1990. In this process, Fajardo represented the over 30,000 local inhabitants affected by the spill of crude oil and toxic waste. Chevron, which instead blames Petroecuador and has not paid the judgement, has had repeated success in arguing against it. The judgement has been validated by further Ecuadorian courts and the Supreme Court of Canada but it has been declared fraudulently obtained by the United States District Court for the Southern District of New York and an arbitration court in The Hague.

== Early life and education ==
Fajardo was raised in the province of Esmeraldas, from where his parents migrated to the Sucumbios province when he was 14. He worked first in an African palm plantation and later on for an oil company, an experience which he says led him to witness social injustice and environmental degradation first hand. When working for these companies as a teenager, Fajardo mobilized colleagues and friends to protest against them, which caused him to be fired. These experiences led Fajardo to the decision to become a professional lawyer defending human rights.

With the help of the Roman Catholic Church, he put himself through law school in the Universidad Técnica Particular de Loja and graduated in 2004.

== Chevron litigation ==
Oil was discovered near the town of Lago Agrio near the Ecuadorian rainforest in the Sucumbíos province and the oil company Texaco, was given rights to retrieve it between 1964 and 1990. Texaco, now owned by Chevron, was accused of not using proper methods to drill the oil. Various studies have shown that the people in the town have cancer rates 3 times higher than other localities in the country, and Fajardo claimed that this was due to the 1,000 unlined toxic waste pits were built throughout the region.

In 1993, American lawyer Stephen Donzinger filed a class-action lawsuit against Texaco for the Union of People Affected by Chevron-Texaco (UDAPT), which represented 6 indigenous nations (Waorani, Siekopai, Siona, A’I Kofan, Shuar y Kichwa) and over 30,000 people. The case, Aguinda v. Texaco, was filed in New York, where the company was headquartered at that time.

In 2002, the case was transferred from New York to Ecuador, and in 2003, Fajardo's legal team filed a new lawsuit against Chevron for the environmental damage to the Amazon. He was made lead lawyer on the case in 2005, and on February 14, 2011, the local court of Sucumbíos ruled that Chevron was to pay $18.1 billion to remediate the extensive pollution of waters, soils and ecosystems, in one of the largest environmental judgements ever made. In 2013, the verdict was confirmed by the Ecuador Supreme Court, though the amount was reduced to $9.5 billion.

== Controversy ==
Chevron ended up liquidating all of its assets in Ecuador over the 20-yearlong litigation, but the corporation has refused to pay the judgement claiming that the decision was “illegitimate and inapplicable”. Chevron continued to operate in Argentina, Brazil, and Canada, where Fajardo's team sued to enforce the Ecuadorian court judgement.

In March 2014, a federal judge in the US concluded that Fajardo's co-counsel, Steven Donzinger, and his team had submitted false evidence in Ecuador. Courtrooms and arbitrations outside Ecuador subsequently made rulings on the case, generally finding in Chevron's favour. However, this was called into question when a key witness for Chevron admitted that his testimony, about the Ecuadorian verdict being coerced, was itself coerced.

In July 2016, the Amazon Defense Coalition (ADC), which backed the original lawsuit responsible for Fajardo's recognition, suspended its relationship with Fajardo, complaining that he was complicit in the Ecuadorian government's decision to pay $112 million to Chevron and not to the ADC. The payment to Chevron Corporation came as a result of an arbitration ordered by an international court. Fajardo rejected the accusation on the basis that the organization he represents is the Union of People Affected by Texaco (UDAPT) and not the ADC. The UDAPT is the sole organization representing the indigenous people and farmers who started the lawsuit against Chevron, as affirmed by the at-the-time president of the Amazon Defense Coalition, Luis Yanza, and among others.

In 2019, Fajardo estimated that Chevron was spending up to $250 million in some years to fight the $9.5 billion fine. On September 7, 2018, an international tribunal administered by the Permanent Court of Arbitration in The Hague unanimously ruled that the judgement "should not be recognised or enforced by the courts of other States". This refers to collection efforts in countries such as Canada where Chevron has subsidiaries. Canadian courts recently decided against piercing the corporate veil to intervene. To describe this situation, Fajardo said "the legal structure that these companies have been building through auxiliary enterprises and holding companies is simply a structure to evade their responsibility and, in this case, to evade justice." He also criticized the Permanent Court of Arbitration for applying a 1993 investment treaty retroactively.

Fajardo is a supporter of the Binding Treaty on Transnational Corporations, proposed by an inter-governmental working group at the United Nations. He has criticized the government of Lenin Moreno for enabling what he sees as a renewed corporate capture of Ecuador.

== Death threats ==
Due to his prominent role in the legal case against Chevron, Fajardo has been target of repeated threats and intimidations. His brother was tortured and killed in the middle of the trial, and Fajardo was later told that he was the true target of this crime. For this reason, in 2005, the Inter-American Commission on Human Rights of the Organization of American States issued precautionary measures for Fajardo and Luis Yanza in an effort to protect their lives.

== Recognitions ==
Fajardo won a CNN "Hero's award" in 2007 and, along with his former associate Luis Yanza, a Goldman Environmental Prize in 2008.

He is featured in the 2009 documentary film Crude.
