= Amazon Defense Coalition =

Ecuadorian non-governmental organization

- Founded: 1994
- Type: Non-governmental organization
- Purpose: Environmentalism; Indigenous rights
- Location(s): Ecuador: Nueva Loja, Coca, and Quito
- Region served: Ecuadorian Amazon
- Key people: Luis Yanza
- Website: http://www.fda.org.ec/

The Amazon Defense Coalition (Frente de Defensa de la Amazonia) is an Ecuadorian non-governmental organization created on May 16, 1994, and approved by the Ecuadorian Ministry of Social Welfare on June 4, 1998, under ministerial reference #535. It is led by the environmental and human rights activist Luis Yanza.

== Purpose ==
The coalition focuses on regional, national and global environmental and collective rights in the Ecuadorian Amazon. It has offices in the Amazonian towns of Nueva Loja (also known as Lago Agrio) and Coca, as well as the nation's capital, Quito.

== Structure ==
The Amazon Defense Coalition (ADC) structure is focused on training (a three-year integral leadership training course offered to Amazonian residents in Orellana and Sucumbíos provinces), legal (legal advice and defence of campesino and indigenous socio-environmental community rights), environmental monitoring (a technical team which monitors and reports on areas and communities that suffer from oil pollution as a result of drilling in the Amazon), and alternative products (promotion of cleaning and energy products that do not harm the environment as well as seeking local sustainable development and biodiversification).

== History ==
The Amazon Defense Coalition was formed in 1994 after a group of 75 indigenous people and farmers brought an environmental clean-up lawsuit against Texaco (consolidated into Chevron Corporation in 2001) in the name of 30,000 Amazonian residents near the Lago Agrio oil field. The accumulation of waste there over three decades now fills a region the size of Rhode Island. The case was initially heard in a U.S. court in New York City where it received representation from New York human rights lawyer Steven Donziger. It 2003, it was moved to Nueva Loja at the request of Chevron who cited the lack of a jury system in Ecuador as one of its reasons. With a 2011 judgement of $18 billion against the oil giant, confirmed but lowered to $9.5 billion in 2013 by the Ecuador Supreme Court, it is potentially the biggest environmental litigation ever brought against a multi-national corporation.

The money would have been used by the ADC to detoxify the soil and treat cancer patients. However, as of 2020, Chevron has evaded the judgement by moving all of its operations out of Ecuador's jurisdiction. Attempts to seek the $9.5 billion in the United States have been blocked by Judge Lewis A. Kaplan who decried the proceedings as a "five-year effort to extort and defraud Chevron". The main witness supporting Kaplan's ruling was found to have lied and been paid by Chevron in 2015. The Ontario Court of Appeals has ruled against the collection on the grounds that Chevron Canada operates with sufficient autonomy from the American company.

The ADC was initially the main organization to follow up the lawsuit. In 2001, the Assembly of People Affected by Texaco (ADAT) was created to better represent the affected communities and make the most significant decisions about the judicial process. The Amazon Defense Coalition became part of the ADAT, which later evolved into the Union of People Affected by Texaco (UDAPT) in 2012. However, the ADC continued to maintain its former structure and internal rules and to act as a social organization in defense of the rights of the Amazonian communities.
