= Crude (2009 film) =

- Film still
- Directed by: Joe Berlinger
- Produced by: Joe Berlinger; Michael Bonfiglio; J.R. DeLeon; Richard Stratton
- Cinematography: Pocho Alvarez; Joe Berlinger; Michael Bonfiglio; Juan Diego Pérez
- Edited by: Alyse Ardell Spiegel
- Music by: Wendy Blackstone
- Distributed by: Entendre Films; Radical Media; Red Envelope Entertainment; Third Eye Motion Picture; First Run Features
- Release date: January 18, 2009 (Sundance)
- Running time: 100 minutes
- Country: United States
- Language: English

Crude is a 2009 American documentary film directed and produced by Joe Berlinger. It follows a two-year portion of an ongoing class action lawsuit against the Chevron Corporation in Ecuador.

== Synopsis ==
The film follows the progress during 2006 and 2007 of a $27 billion legal case brought against the Chevron Corporation following the drilling of the Lago Agrio oil field, a case described by activists as an "Amazon Chernobyl".

The plaintiffs of the class action lawsuit are 30,000 Ecuadorians living in the Amazonian rainforest who claim their ancestral homeland has been polluted by the oil industry. In addition to the legal struggle, Crude shows interviews from representatives of the plaintiffs and defendants of the class action lawsuit, and explores the influence of media support such as Vanity Fair, celebrity activism including support from musical artist Sting and his wife Trudie Styler, the power of multinational corporations, the shifting power in Ecuadorian politics, and rapidly disappearing indigenous cultures are explored in the movie.

The film ends with a prediction the lawsuit will not be resolved for another decade or so unless an out of court settlement is arranged.

== Interviews ==
- Juan Diego Perez
- Pocho Alvarez
- Joe Berlinger (producer of Crude)
- Michael Bonfiglio
- Sting (activist, artist and co-founder of Rainforest Foundation Fund)
- Trudie Styler (activist, producer, and co-founder of Rainforest Foundation Fund with her husband Sting)
- Adolfo Callejas (Ecuadorian lawyer on behalf of Chevron-Texaco)
- Steven Donziger (American lawyer on behalf of the plaintiffs)
- Pablo Fajardo (Ecuadorian lawyer on behalf of the plaintiffs)
- Diego Larrea (Ecuadorian Lawyer on behalf of Chevron-Texaco)
- Rafael Correa (President of the Republic of Ecuador)
- Sara McMillen (Chief Environmental Scientist for Chevron)
- Ricardo Reis Veiga (Corporate counsel for Chevron Latin America)

== Subpoena of footage ==
On May 6, 2010 federal judge Lewis Kaplan sided with a petition submitted by Chevron and ruled that Berlinger turn over more than 600 hours of original footage created during the film's production. Kaplan held that Berlinger’s outtakes were not confidential and that Berlinger was not independent from Donziger (a lawyer of the Ecuadorians living in the Amazonian). Chevron had sought to subpoena the footage as part of the ongoing lawsuit discussed in the film. Berlinger's legal team has maintained that the footage is protected by reporters' privilege, Berlinger said there's an expectation on the part of his subjects that the raw footage is not going to be released as it's a 24/7 webcam on their lives.

Chevron insists it bears no responsibility for pollution in the Amazon and, after losing the case in Ecuador, hired hundreds of lawyers from 60 firms to fight the case in more than a dozen U.S. federal courts. The lawyer representing Chevron called the film in this context "an unapologetic work of propaganda". Berlinger noted that the movie has received international acclaim, that he maintained complete editorial control over the film at all times and argued that he had in fact gone to great lengths to make Crude a balanced portrayal. Berlinger admitted that he was stunned at the level of environmental devastation he saw in Ecuador, but pointed out that the film also included many arguments from Chevron’s perspective on the court case.

In the outtakes of the movie Donziger, a lawyer representing the Ecuadorians suing Chevron for environmental damages in the Amazonian rainforest, said Texaco (now Chevron) lawyers play dirty in Ecuador and suggested ideas to also play dirty, like pressuring the court through protests of farmers. Chevron claimed the outtakes show enough misconduct by the plaintiffs to render any judgment against it illegitimate. A lawyer for the plaintiffs also suggested airing meeting scenes could cost them the case. A spokeswoman for the plaintiffs answered about the scene, these were however just ideas of Donziger and in some cases colleagues making jokes in brainstorming sessions. She pointed out a rally to pressure the court never took place and called the outtakes a sideshow to distract from Chevron’s contamination of the rain forest. A scene showing the strategy session of Donziger had been cut from the DVD release, but was included the online version for Netflix. The US 2nd Circuit Court of Appeals narrowed the scope slightly (Berlinger had to turn over 500 hours of outtakes, rather than 600), but in 2011 upheld the lower court ruling against Berlinger.

The judge Lewis Kaplan ruled in 2014 that the American lawyers for the plaintiffs had used fraud in obtaining the $19 billion Ecuadorian court judgment against Chevron and cited the film outtakes as a reason for his decision. That judgment was affirmed by the United States Court of Appeals for the Second Circuit. Kaplan also ruled that Donziger was guilty of fraud. The decisions of the court for Chevron and against Donziger were highly controversial, it was later also revealed that the witness for the version of Chevron was paid several hundreds thousand dollars by Chevron. In September 2020, the National Lawyers Guild and International Association of Democratic Lawyers filed a joint complaint against Kaplan, alleging that “statements and actions of Judge Kaplan over the last ten years show him to have taken on the role of counsel for Chevron”. According to Amazon Watch, Kaplan had held investments in Chevron at the time of the trial.

Berlinger had to spend an estimated amount of $1.3 million on legal fees on the case about the movie and expressed concerns about being able to make documentaries about legal cases in the future.

== Reception ==
=== Critical response ===
On review aggregator website Rotten Tomatoes, the film holds an approval rating of 95% based on 65 reviews, and an average rating of 7.4/10. The website's critical consensus reads, "Dynamic, tightly arranged, and deliberately provocative, Joe Berlinger's Crude is a sobering, enraging wake-up call." On Metacritic, the film has a weighted average score of 75 out of 100, based on 21 critics, indicating "generally favorable" reviews.

Crude was reviewed in The New York Times, in LA Weekly, on AlterNet, and by Howard Zinn.

== Release ==
Crude premiered on January 18, 2009 at the Sundance Film Festival and had its theatrical premiere on September 9, 2009, at the IFC Center in New York City.

=== Film festivals (partial list) ===
- Sundance Film Festival, United States
- San Francisco International Film Festival, United States
- SILVERDOCS: AFI/Discovery Channel Documentary Festival, United States
- Sydney Film Festival, Australia
- One World Film Festival, Czech Republic
- Thessaloniki Documentary Festival, Greece
- Independent Film Festival of Boston, United States
- Cleveland International Film Festival, United States
- True/False Film Festival, United States
- Nashville Film Festival, United States
- Newport Beach Film Festival, United States
- Little Rock Film Festival, United States
- Jacksonville Film Festival, United States
- Sarasota Film Festival, United States
- Lake Placid Film Festival, United States
- Sidewalk Moving Picture Festival, United States

== See also ==
- Amazonia for Sale
- The Coconut Revolution
