= Loretta Preska =

American judge (born 1949)

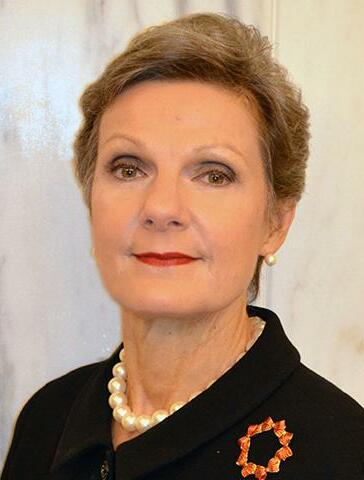
- Preska in 2012

Senior Judge of the United States District Court for the Southern District of New York
- Incumbent
- Assumed office March 1, 2017

Chief Judge of the United States District Court for the Southern District of New York
- In office 2009 – May 31, 2016
- Preceded by: Kimba Wood
- Succeeded by: Colleen McMahon

Judge of the United States District Court for the Southern District of New York
- In office August 12, 1992 – March 1, 2017
- Appointed by: George H. W. Bush
- Preceded by: Robert Joseph Ward
- Succeeded by: Mary Kay Vyskocil

Personal details
- Born: 1949 (age 76–77) Albany, New York, U.S.
- Spouse: Thomas J. Kavaler (m. 1983)
- Children: 2
- Education: College of Saint Rose (BA); Fordham University (JD); New York University (LLM)

Loretta A. Preska (born 1949) is an American lawyer who serves as a senior United States district judge of the United States District Court for the Southern District of New York. Born in Albany, Preska received law degrees from Fordham University School of Law and New York University School of Law. She practiced law in New York City from 1973 to 1992 at the law firms of Cahill Gordon & Reindel and Hertzog, Calamari & Gleason (now Winston & Strawn). President George H. W. Bush appointed her to the district bench in 1992. She served as chief judge of the court for a seven-year term from 2009 to 2016, and took senior status in 2017. President George W. Bush nominated Preska to the U.S. Court of Appeals for the Second Circuit in 2008, but the Senate did not act on the nomination.

== Early life and education ==
Preska was born in Albany, New York, in 1949, to her father, Victor, an engineer at Benét Laboratories at Watervliet Arsenal, and her mother, Etta Mae, a registered nurse. She is of Lithuanian descent. She grew up in the Albany suburb of Delmar, where she was active in the Girl Scouts and graduated from Bethlehem Central High School.

She earned her B.A. degree in chemistry from the College of Saint Rose (1970), her J.D. from Fordham University School of Law (1973), and her LL.M from New York University School of Law (1978). Her LL.M work focused on trade regulation.

== Legal career ==
Preska was an attorney in private practice in New York City from 1973 until 1992. She worked at Cahill Gordon & Reindel from 1973 to 1982, and then at Hertzog, Calamari & Gleason (Note: Hertzog, Calamari & Gleason merged into Winston & Strawn in 1999.) from 1982 until her appointment to the federal bench. She primarily practiced commercial civil litigation in the federal courts, but also represented several officers of EF Hutton in grand jury proceedings in connection with a case in which the company entered criminal guilty pleas. She cites Floyd Abrams as a friend and mentor.

== Federal judicial service ==
Preska was nominated by President George H. W. Bush on March 31, 1992, to a seat on the United States District Court for the Southern District of New York vacated by Judge Robert Joseph Ward. Senator Al D'Amato recommended the nomination. Preska was confirmed by the United States Senate on August 11, 1992, by unanimous consent. She received her commission the following day. Her confirmation was part of a "bipartisan package" that also including the confirmation of Sonia Sotomayor (who later became a Supreme Court justice). Sotomayor was confirmed by the Senate to the district bench the same day, also unanimously.

Preska served as chief judge of the court for a seven-year term from June 1, 2009, to May 31, 2016, succeeding Kimba M. Wood in the role. As chief judge, Preska pressed for more adequate funding for the federal judiciary, which suffered from the effects of the Great Recession and budget sequestration. In 2010, as chief judge, Preska issued an order permitting criminal defense attorneys to carry mobile phones into the courthouse; previously, only federal prosecutors were permitted to do so. The rule change followed several years of lobbying by the Federal Bar Council.

She took senior status on March 1, 2017.

=== Consideration for higher courts ===
In 2007, it was reported that Preska was on President George W. Bush's short list of potential Supreme Court nominees.

On September 9, 2008, Bush nominated Preska to a judgeship on the U.S. Court of Appeals for the Second Circuit to replace Judge Chester J. Straub, who retired. The American Bar Association's Standing Committee on the Federal Judiciary unanimously rated Preska "well qualified" for the circuit judgeship, the committee's highest rating. The Senate did not act on the nomination, and it expired in January 2009 at the end of the 110th Congress, upon the sine die adjournment of the Senate.

=== Tenure and notable cases ===
Preska is considered a conservative judge, and served on the advisory board of the Federalist Society. Preska has presided over a number of notable cases.

==== Civil cases ====
===== Commercial, copyright, and contract litigation =====
In Leibovitz v. Paramount Pictures Corp. (1996), Preska ruled that an image of the actor Leslie Nielsen seemingly pregnant that mimicked a similar photo of Demi Moore was fair use as parody. Her ruling was upheld by the Second Circuit in 1998. In National Basketball Association v. Motorola, Inc. (1997), Preska ruled in favor of the NBA, granting a permanent injunction blocking Motorola Inc. and a statistics company from transmitting real-time basketball scores and other statistics through its "SportsTrax" pager service. Preska ruled that the service was a commercial misappropriation rather than mere media coverage, but dismissed the NBA's copyright and Lanham Act false-advertising claims. On appeal, the Second Circuit vacated the injunction, finding that the service was neither an unlawful misappropriation nor a Lanham Act violation.

Preska presided over the case of Mastercard International Inc. v. Fédération Internationale de Football Association (2006), brought by MasterCard against FIFA after the soccer association awarded sponsorship deals for the next two World Cups to MasterCard's rival Visa. Preska ruled in December 2006 that FIFA had violated its previous 16-year sponsorship contract with MasterCard, which included a clause granting MasterCard a right of first refusal. The parties subsequently settled the case.

In Zuckerman v. Metropolitan Museum of Art (2018), Preska ruled in favor of the Metropolitan Museum of Art, dismissing a lawsuit seeking the return of Picasso's painting The Actor to the heir of its original owners, Paul and Alice Leffmann. The Leffmanns were a German Jewish couple who sold the painting in 1938 to finance their flight from Nazis. The painting was acquired by the Met in 1952. Preska ruled that the Leffmanns' heir could not show, under New York law, that the painting was sold under duress. The U.S. Court of Appeals for the Second Circuit affirmed the dismissal on the ground that the claim was raised too late (72 years after the work was sold and 58 years after it was donated to the art museum).

===== Defamation litigation =====
In 1998, Preska presided over a defamation suit brought by Richard Jewell against the New York Post. Jewell, who was wrongly suspected of being the Centennial Olympic Park bomber, alleged that several articles, headlines, photographs, and editorial cartoons in the newspaper had libeled him. Preska dismissed claims based on a photograph and an editorial cartoon, but allowed the remainder of the claims to proceed. The Post subsequently settled the case for an undisclosed sum.

In 2019, Preska disqualified the law firm of Boies Schiller Flexner LLP from representing Virginia Giuffre in her lawsuit against professor emeritus Alan Dershowitz, but denied Dershowitz's motion to dismiss the suit, in which Giuffre alleged that Dershowitz falsely claimed that she fabricated her sexual-abuse accusations against Jeffrey Epstein, and thus defamed her. In 2020, Preska denied a motion by British socialite Ghislaine Maxwell, an Epstein associate charged with recruiting girls abused by Epstein, to block the public release of her 2016 deposition testimony in a civil case. Preska stayed her ruling pending Maxwell's appeal to the Second Circuit.

===== Labor litigation =====
Preska presided over long-running litigation between Local 100 of the Hotel Employees and Restaurant Employees Union and New York's Metropolitan Opera. In June 2000, Preska found the union to be in contempt, determining that the union had defamed the Met and engaged in harassment of Met board members. Preska enjoined the union from distributing leaflets at the opera, but at the 2000 season opening, the union held a demonstration. In February 2001, a panel of the U.S. Court of Appeals for the Second Circuit vacated the injunction, holding that "While the injunction presents serious questions under the First Amendment and libel law, we hold that the injunction is impermissibly vague because it fails to provide the Union with adequate notice of what conduct is being enjoined." In November 2002, however, the Second Circuit held that Lincoln Center could permissibly block the union from holding a rally in Lincoln Plaza, holding that the location was not a "public forum" and that Lincoln Center management had a consistent policy of limiting "expression in the plaza to events having an artistic or performance-related component." In January 2003, in a strongly worded 148-page decision, Preska ruled in favor of the Met in its defamation and harassment suit against the union, writing that the union and its counsel had withheld evidence in violation of the discovery rules and had not been truthful to the court. She ordered the union to pay the Met's sizable legal fees.

In 2015, Preska approved a settlement agreement between the federal government and the International Brotherhood of Teamsters, terminating the consent decree that had been in place for 25 years. The consent decree required certain reforms to combat organized crime influence and corruption within the union, and had been entered into in 1989 to settle a civil racketeering suit brought against the Teamsters by the government. Under the settlement, a five-year transition away from federal monitoring of the union began.

===== Other litigation =====
In Bloomberg L.P. v. Board of Governors of the Federal Reserve System (2009), Preska presided over a Freedom of Information Act suit brought by Bloomberg L.P. against the Federal Reserve System, seeking to compel the Fed to provide documents revealing the identity of recipients of bailouts from the Troubled Asset Relief Program during the 2008 financial crisis, along with the types and amounts of collateral provided. Preska sided with Bloomberg News reporters, concluding that the Fed's claims that disclosure would cause an "imminent competitive harm" to borrowers were merely conjecture. The Second Circuit affirmed this ruling.

In a 2014 case, Microsoft challenged a federal search warrant for a customer's email records, on the ground that the data was stored on servers in a data center in Ireland and could not be produced to the U.S. authorities without an Irish warrant. The magistrate judge denied Microsoft's motion to quash the warrant, and following a hearing, Preska upheld the magistrate judge's ruling in a decision from the bench, holding that "It is a question of control, not a question of the location of that information." In 2016, the Second Circuit reversed on appeal, determining that the Stored Communications Act of 1986 did not apply extraterritorially. The case went to the Supreme Court, but was dismissed as moot due to Congress's enactment of the CLOUD Act in 2018, which created a process for U.S. investigators to access data stored overseas.

In Consumer Financial Protection Bureau v. RD Legal Funding, LLC (2018), Preska overturned the entirety of Title X of the Dodd-Frank Wall Street Reform and Consumer Protection Act, which created the Consumer Financial Protection Bureau. Preska ruled that the law establishing the CFPB's structure was unconstitutional because it established that the agency's single director could be removed by the president only for cause. Preska disagreed with the en banc decision of the U.S. Court of Appeals for the District of Columbia Circuit that upheld the constitutionality of the CFPB's structure, and sided with the dissenter in that case, then-Judge Brett Kavanaugh, who believed that the protections for the CFPB director violated the Constitution's Take Care Clause. (The U.S. Supreme Court ultimately ruled, in a 5–4 decision in Seila Law v. CFPB (2020), that the law's mandate that a CFPB director be removed only "for cause" was unconstitutional, but severed that portion of the statute, allowing the CFPB to continue operating while making its director removable at the will of the president.)

==== Criminal cases ====
In 2008, Susan Lindauer, a former journalist and congressional aide charged with acting as an unregistered foreign agent of Saddam Hussein's Iraqi government, was released after Preska ruled her unfit to stand trial, saying that she was "highly intelligent" and "generally capable of functioning at a high level in many ways," but suffered from a mental disease or defect that left her with "a lack of connection with reality" and rendered her "unable to understand the nature and consequences of the proceedings against her or to assist properly in her defense." Preska's ruling affirmed earlier rulings by Judge Michael B. Mukasey.

In 2011, Preska sentenced Somali pirate Abduwali Muse to 33 years in prison for his leadership of a group of pirates who seized the Maersk Alabama and held its crew hostage. In pronouncing sentence, Preska cited the defendant's "depraved acts of physical and psychological violence" including forcing Captain Richard Phillips to undergo a mock execution.

Preska oversaw the criminal case against Hector Xavier Monsegur ("Sabu"), a computer hacker who assisted Anonymous and others in cyberattacks targeting credit card companies, various governments, and media outlets. Monsegur became a government informant immediately after his arrest in early 2011, and pleaded guilty in August 2011 to twelve counts of hacking, fraud, and identity theft. In 2014, Preska sentenced Monsegur to time served (seven months in jail) and a $1,200 fine; federal prosecutors requested, and Preska granted, the lenient sentence due to Monsegur's "extraordinary" cooperation with the government. Information from Monsegur helped lead the authorities to at least eight co-conspirators, including Jeremy Hammond, and helped to stymie at least 300 cyberattacks. Hammond pleaded guilty in 2013 to hacking the private intelligence firm Stratfor, and Preska sentenced him to the maximum 10 years.

In 2009, Ahmed Khalfan Ghailani, the first detainee brought from the Guantanamo Bay detention camp to stand trial in a U.S. civilian court (as opposed to a Guantanamo military commission), appeared before Preska to plead not guilty. In 2010, Ghailani subsequently was convicted by a jury of conspiracy in the 1998 bombing of U.S. embassies in Kenya and Tanzania, and in 2011 was sentenced to life in prison. Ghailani's trial and sentencing were by a different Southern District judge, Lewis A. Kaplan.

In 2014, Preska sentenced Eric Stevenson, a former New York state assemblyman from the Bronx, to three years in prison for bribery. In 2019, Preska sentenced Patrick Ho, a former Hong Kong ophthalmologist and government official, to three years in prison for conspiring to bribe African government officials (specifically, the presidents of Chad and Uganda) to secure oil rights for CEFC China, an energy company.

In 2017, Preska sentenced former Rikers Island guard Brian Coll to 30 years in prison for beating inmate Ronald Spear to death in 2012. Coll had been convicted the preceding year of deprivation of civil rights resulting in death, obstruction of justice, falsifying records, and conspiracy. Coll repeatedly kicked Spear, a seriously ill pretrial detainee in the jail complex's infirmary unit, in the head while other guards held the inmate face-down on the floor. During the sentencing hearing, Preska criticized a "culture of violence and poor treatment of inmates" at Rikers and referred to the "particularly vicious and callous" nature of Coll's attack on Spear.

Preska oversaw the proceedings against Chuck Person, a former NBA player and assistant coach of the Auburn Tigers men's basketball team, who was implicated in a college basketball corruption scandal. Preska denied Person's motion to dismiss the charges. In 2019, after he pleaded guilty to conspiracy to commit bribery, Preska sentenced him to two years of probation and 200 hours of community service. She found that "no purpose would be served" by sending the remorseful Person to prison; rejected prosecutors' argument that Person was motivated by "insatiable greed"; and cited Person's long record of charitable giving.

===== Steven Donziger =====
In a 2021 bench trial, Preska found attorney Steven Donziger guilty of six counts of criminal contempt; in a 245-page opinion, Preska said that Donziger had "repeatedly and willfully" defied court orders. He faces a maximum six-month jail sentence. Preska wrote that she did not question the sincerity of Donziger's longrunning legal battle against Chevron on behalf of Ecuadorians over pollution in Ecuador's rainforest, but that Donziger was not entitled to "take the law into his own hands." The United Nations' Human Rights Council criticized the situation and said that Donziger had not been granted a fair trial. With regards to Preska, "[...] The Working Group is of the view that Judge P did not act in a manner which was independent, objective and impartial in relation to Mr. Donziger's case. Consequently, the Working Group concludes that the imposition of pre-trial detention upon Mr. Donziger violated Article 9 (3) of the Covenant." The council was also critical of how Judge Kaplan appointed Preska to hear Donziger's case and of Preska's dismissal of Donziger's challenge to her appointment.

== Personal life ==
In 1983, Preska married Thomas J. Kavaler, with whom she attended law school. Kavaler was the editor-in-chief of the Fordham Law Review and is a partner at Cahill Gordon & Reindel. They live in Garrison, New York. The couple had two children.

== Sources ==
Legal offices
Preceded by Robert Joseph Ward	Judge of the United States District Court for the Southern District of New York; 1992–2017	Succeeded by Mary Kay Vyskocil
Preceded by Kimba Wood	Chief Judge of the United States District Court for the Southern District of New York; 2009–2016	Succeeded by Colleen McMahon
