= Seward & Kissel =

American law firm

- Headquarters: New York City, New York and Washington, DC
- No. of attorneys: 160
- Major practice areas: Financial services
- Date founded: 1890
- Website: www.sewkis.com

Seward & Kissel is an American law firm with offices in New York City and Washington, D.C. that was founded in 1890. Its primary expertise is in the financial services industry. The firm's clientele includes commercial banks, investment funds, institutional investors, and shipping and transport companies. As of September 2015, the firm had 160 lawyers.

== History ==
Seward & Kissel began as Smith & Martin and has been headquartered in downtown New York City since its founding. In 1949, the firm advised in the formation of the first hedge fund. It opened its Washington office in 1977 and its transportation and shipping practice in 1992. The firm “has remained independent since its founding in 1890, a rarity for a midsize law firm these days,” noted one financial website in 2015.

Seward & Kissel takes the first half of its name from George Seward, who became a partner at Meyer, Kidder, Matz & Kissel, one the previous iterations of the firm, in 1953. He remained an active partner until 1983 and continued working at the firm until 2011. He held many leadership positions at the American Bar Association, founded the business law section of the International Bar Association, and was the honorary life president of the International Bar Association. He died in 2012 at the age of 101.

In September 2015, the firm celebrated its 125th anniversary by burying a time capsule outside its Battery Park offices. The plan is for the capsule to be recovered 125 years later. Managing Partner John Tavss expressed the hope “that Seward & Kissel will still be thriving in the year 2140, when this time capsule is to be opened.” Among the items placed in the time capsule were a BlackBerry, a business card, a Zagat guide, and a New York City Subway map.

While presiding over the environmental case brought by Ecuadorian Native groups against Texaco-Chevron, Judge Lewis A. Kaplan appointed Seward & Kissel to prosecute environmental lawyer Steven Donziger. Seward & Kissel partner Rita Glavin claimed that the firm did not have a conflict of interest with regards to the case, even though it has worked directly with Chevron at least twice, including as recently as 2018. This resulted in a law student boycott against Seward & Kissel. The boycott began in February 2021 and involves around 300 law students from around 50 law schools. In a letter, the students state that the firm has a conflict of interest in prosecuting Steven Donziger, saying: "We, the undersigned law students, refuse to consider employment with the firm until it withdraws from its conflicted position as Chevron's private prosecutor".

== Lawsuits ==
On February 27, 2012, ruling in favor of a group of plaintiffs represented by Seward & Kissel, the Delaware Court of Chancery enjoined the sale of BankAtlantic by BankAtlantic Bancorp (BBX) to Branch Bank & Trust, agreeing that the sale would violate the contractual rights of holders of BBX trust securities. “This decision is significant,” stated one report, “because it sends a message to all Banks with trust preferred securities (TruPS) that they cannot infringe on the rights of the TruPS holders when trying to restructure.”

In May 2016, Gray Financial Group sued Seward & Kissel in a Georgia federal court for $12 million. Gray charged the firm with malpractice, saying that it had been negligent in advising Gray to sell funds to a state pension, thus rendering Gray “vulnerable to federal investigations.” In response, Seward & Kissel called the allegations “meritless and sanctionable.”

== Ratings ==
Chambers USA 2019: 4 practices (Investment Management, Corporate/M&A, Bankruptcy/Restructuring and Maritime Finance) and 14 lawyers ranked.

Legal 500 US 2018: 2 practices (Hedge Funds and Corporate/M&A) and 4 lawyers ranked.

25 lawyers ranked as SuperLawyers.

The U.S. News - Best Lawyers: 4 practices nationally ranked and 5 additional practices ranked regionally.
