= Aguinda v. Texaco, Inc. =

Class-action lawsuit

Aguinda v. Texaco, Inc. was a class-action lawsuit against Texaco Petroleum. It was filed in 1993 by American human rights lawyer Steven Donziger on behalf of indigenous collectives in the Ecuadorian Amazon. The lawsuit sought compensation for "alleged environmental and personal injuries arising out of Texaco's oil exploration and extraction operations in the Oriente region between 1964 and 1992". Legal proceedings followed in courts in Ecuador and the United States for about a decade. The case was dismissed on May 30, 2001, on grounds of forum non conveniens (meaning that the case was outside the jurisdiction of US courts and should be heard in Ecuadorian or international courts).

Following dismissal of Aguinda v. Texaco in the US, plaintiffs filed Maria Aguinda Salazar v, ChevronTexaco Corp in Ecuador in 2003, which in turn led to other progeny cases including Republic of Ecuador v. ChevronTexaco Corp and Moi Vicente Enomenga Mantohue v. Chevron Corporation and Texaco Petroleum Company.

== Background ==
=== Exploitation ===
In the early years of modern oil extraction, the Ecuadorian government and corporations viewed the petroleum-rich Amazon as tierras baldias, or unoccupied lands. Instead, the Ecuadorian Amazon was home to indigenous peoples including the Quichua, Shuar, Achuar, Cofan, Huaorani, Shiwiar, Secoya, and Siona. Texaco Petroleum signed its first contract with the Ecuadorian government in 1964. Oil extraction went completely unregulated through much of the 20th century. By 1990, nearly 1.5 billion barrels of oil had been extracted from the Oriente alone, one of several Amazonian regions in Ecuador.

=== Indigenous organizing ===
Indigenous Amazon groups often center environmental sustainability in their religions, cultures, and community practices. In Cofan cosmology, the crust of Amazonian earth hosts the coancoan, creatures who provide goodwill and healing to their communities and who are damaged by oil extraction.

1970s indigenous resistance actions against oil development originated in Cofan territory.

Randy Borman, who had been raised in the Cofán community of Dureno, was central to the re-articulation of the Cofán as subjects who actively engage political, environmental, and citizenship practices ... by 1978 Dureno was recognized by the state as an indigenous collective with a specific use and access rights to a delimited territory and subject to national law

— Dr. Gabriela Valdivia of Michigan State University

Alongside Dureno, Borman established FEINCE, the liaison organization between Cofan peoples and the government. In 1984, Secoya peoples developed OISE, an organization dedicated to indigenous autonomy. OISE's partnered with Danish NGO IBIS in 1987. El Confederación de Nacionalidades Indígenas de la Amazonia Ecuatoriana (CONAIE) formed in 1980 as a pan-indigenous coalition of over 900 Amazonian communities pursuing cultural preservation and ancestral land. This organization has supported smaller groups like FEINCE in their pursuits of environmental justice.

Indigenous peoples were protected in the country's pre-2008 constitution from environmental degradation; however, Petroecuador and Texaco violated these restrictions on oil development. A new constitution was ratified in 2008. Though Texaco's petroleum contract in Ecuador ended on June 7, 1992, Petroecuador continued to exploit natural resources in the Amazon.

== History ==
In 1993, indigenous collectives filed Aguinda v. Texaco, Inc. This class-action lawsuit alleged past negligence. It was filed in the United States District Court for the Southern District of New York. Among the indigenous groups involved in this lawsuit were FEINCE (Cofan), OISE (Secoya), and FOISE (Quichua). A related proceeding was filed in the Southern District of Texas and others were filed in Lago Agrio courthouse in Ecuador.

This was the first form of legal resistance against petroleum exploitation in the Amazon. The lawsuit was first dismissed in 1995 by Judge Jed Rakoff, who stated that US courts have no obligation to adjudicate international disputes. Texaco and the Ecuadorian government tried to settle the lawsuit later that year through mediation; however, the Energy Ministry discovered soon after that Texaco had not disclosed two hundred additional waste pits in Ecuador.

In 1997, the government of Ecuador repeated efforts to intervene under the waiver of sovereign immunity, but Judge Rakoff once again denied that request, citing an "untimely and prejudicial" bias against Texaco. The 1998 election of President Jamil Mahuad spurred another quiet mediation. In combination with other Ecuadorian political issues, this spurred a 2000 military junta to overthrow Mahuad and replace him with a military–citizen triumvirate which included CONAIE (pan-indigenous organization) leader Antonio Vargas. They were quickly removed from power and Gustavo Noboa Bejerano rose to the presidency. This political turmoil prompted Judge Rakoff to re-open the Aguinda case.

In September 2000, the indigenous plaintiffs called for Rakoff to recuse himself due to financial ties with a Texaco subsidiary. He denied this request, and on May 30, 2001, dismissed the lawsuit, once again on the grounds that the United States was not the appropriate forum. On August 16, 2002, the United States Court of Appeals for the Second Circuit affirmed Rakoff's decision. The dismissal set a precedent for indigenous peoples' struggles taking legal action against exploitation.

=== 2003 and beyond ===
Some of the Aguinda plaintiffs and other indigenous advocates re-filed in Ecuadorian court in 2003. This case, called Moi Vicente Enomenga Mantohue v. Chevron Corporation and Texaco Petroleum Company (also called Tena because it was filed in Tena court), forced Ecuadorian courts and settlers to view indigenous peoples beyond the stereotypes of eco-primitivism and illegibility.

In the Tena case, the president of the court refused to process the complaint for arbitrary reasons: (1) because the complaint had not been translated into English and defendant ChevronTexaco resides in the United States; and (2) for jurisdictional reasons because the affected lands owned by the plaintiffs' communities include lands beyond the geographic boundaries of the provinces where the court is located.

— Judith Kimerling

Ecuador's 2008 constitution granted inalienable rights to nature itself. The new President Rafael Correa publicly supported the indigenous plaintiffs in cases against American petroleum companies, while privately backing some mining efforts in the Amazon. In 2011, a court in Lago Agrio found the company liable for widespread harm of the Amazon and its indigenous people. Chevron was ordered to pay nearly US$19 billion in damages, and, additionally, Chevron had to fund the Amazon Defense Fund, which supports and works alongside indigenous communities. Chevron challenged the validity of this ruling, which prompted intervention from five additional Huaorani groups. The award was later lowered to approximately $9.5 billion, which was affirmed by Ecuador's highest courts.
