= Arnold Bauman =

American judge (1914–1989)

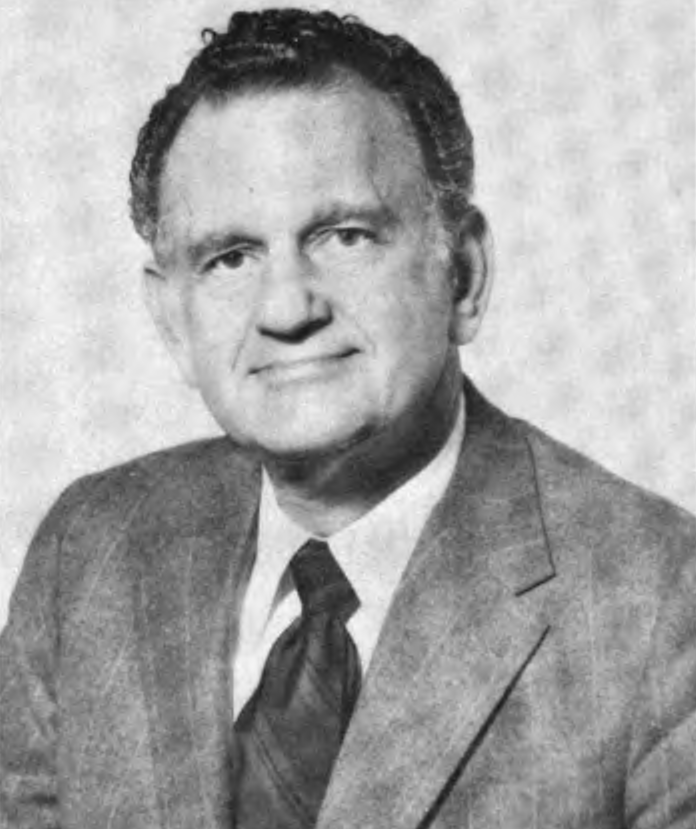

Judge of the United States District Court for the Southern District of New York
- In office December 15, 1971 – August 15, 1974
- Appointed by: Richard Nixon
- Preceded by: Seat established by 84 Stat. 294
- Succeeded by: Gerard Louis Goettel

Personal details
- Born: Arnold Bauman; July 25, 1914 New York City, New York
- Died: November 21, 1989 (aged 75) New York City, New York
- Education: St. John's University (B.B.A.); New York University School of Law (J.D.)

Arnold Bauman (July 24, 1914 – November 20, 1989) was a United States district judge of the United States District Court for the Southern District of New York.

== Education and career ==
Born in New York City, New York, Arnold Bauman received a Bachelor of Business Administration degree from St. John's University in 1934, and a Juris Doctor from New York University School of Law in 1937. He was a prosecutor in the District Attorney's Office of New York County, New York from 1937 to 1941, and an assistant district attorney in that office from 1945 to 1947. In the interim, from 1941 to 1945, he was a United States Naval Reserve Lieutenant. He was engaged in the private practice from 1947 to 1953, then became head of the Criminal Division of the United States Attorney's Office for the Southern District of New York until he resigned in 1955 to enter private practice.

== Federal judicial service ==
Bauman was nominated by President Richard Nixon on December 2, 1971, to the United States District Court for the Southern District of New York, to a new seat created by 84 Stat. 294. He was confirmed by the United States Senate on December 12, 1971, and received his commission on December 14, 1971. His service terminated on August 15, 1974, due to resignation. In resigning, he cited the insufficient pay, then $40,000 per year, allotted to federal district judges.

== Post judicial service ==
Following his resignation, he returned to private practice, serving until his death on November 20, 1989, in New York City.

== Sources ==
- NYT obituary

Legal offices
Preceded by Seat established by 84 Stat. 294	Judge of the United States District Court for the Southern District of New York; 1971–1974	Succeeded by Gerard Louis Goettel
