= Mary Kay Vyskocil =

American judge (born 1958)

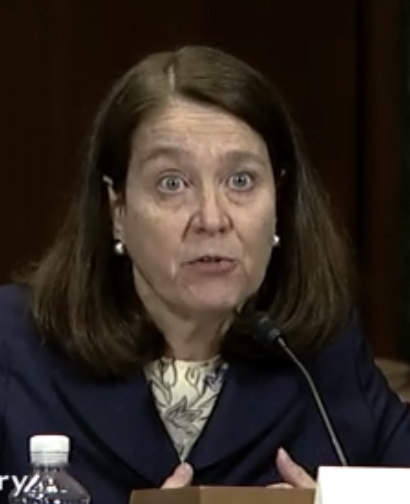

Judge of the United States District Court for the Southern District of New York
- Incumbent
- Assumed office December 20, 2019
- Appointed by: Donald Trump
- Preceded by: Loretta Preska

Judge of the United States Bankruptcy Court for the Southern District of New York
- In office April 7, 2016 – December 20, 2019
- Succeeded by: David Jones

Personal details
- Born: May 22, 1958 (age 67) New York City, New York, U.S.
- Education: Dominican University (BA); St. John's University (JD)

Mary Kay Vyskocil (born May 22, 1958) is a United States district judge of the United States District Court for the Southern District of New York and a former United States bankruptcy judge for the same court. President Donald Trump nominated her to the district bench in 2018 and again in 2019, and she was confirmed in 2019.

== Education ==
Vyskocil earned her Bachelor of Arts degree from the Dominican College in Rockland County, New York, where she was the class valedictorian and student government president, and her Juris Doctor from St. John's University School of Law, where she served on the Moot Court Executive Board.

== Legal career ==
Prior to her appointment to the bench, she practiced general commercial litigation for almost thirty-three years at the New York City-based law firm of Simpson Thacher & Bartlett.

== Federal judicial service ==
=== Bankruptcy court service ===
Vyskocil was selected to become a judge of the United States Bankruptcy Court for the Southern District of New York in 2016. She was sworn in as a United States bankruptcy judge on April 7, 2016, and served until her elevation as a district court judge.

=== District court service ===
In August 2017, Vyskocil was one of several candidates pitched to New York senators Chuck Schumer and Kirsten Gillibrand by the White House as judicial candidates for vacancies on the federal courts in New York. On May 10, 2018, President Donald Trump announced his intent to nominate Vyskocil to serve as a United States district judge for the United States District Court for the Southern District of New York. On May 15, 2018, her nomination was sent to the Senate. She was nominated to the seat that was vacated by Judge Loretta A. Preska, who assumed senior status on March 1, 2017. On August 1, 2018, a hearing on her nomination was held before the Senate Judiciary Committee. On September 13, 2018, her nomination was reported out of committee by a 21–0 vote.

On January 3, 2019, her nomination was returned to the President under Rule XXXI, Paragraph 6 of the United States Senate. On April 8, 2019, President Trump announced the renomination of Vyskocil to the district court. On May 21, 2019, her nomination was sent to the Senate. On June 20, 2019, her nomination was reported out of committee by a 21–1 vote. On December 18, 2019, the United States Senate invoked cloture on her nomination by a 89–4 vote. On December 19, 2019, her nomination was confirmed by a 91–3 vote. She received her judicial commission on December 20, 2019.

=== Notable rulings ===
On December 5, 2019, Karen McDougal, an American model and one-time Playboy magazine Playmate who had an affair with Trump in 2006 to 2007, filed a defamation lawsuit against the television network Fox News. According to the suit, network anchor Tucker Carlson defamed McDougal by saying that she had personally extorted Trump for the hush money she received in 2016, a claim she denied. On September 24, 2020, Vyskocil dismissed the defamation lawsuit, writing that, "The statements are rhetorical hyperbole and opinion commentary intended to frame a political debate, and, as such, are not actionable as defamation". The judge added that the "'general tenor' of the show should then inform a viewer that [Carlson] is not 'stating actual facts' about the topics he discusses and is instead engaging in 'exaggeration' and 'non-literal commentary.'"

In a lawsuit filed on Tuesday April 11, 2023, Manhattan District Attorney Alvin Bragg sued House Judiciary Committee Chairman Jim Jordan and the committee to block a subpoena compelling former New York prosecutor Mark F. Pomerantz to testify to the House committee. The suit alleges that former President Donald J. Trump, Jordan, and other members of the House committee are engaged in "a campaign of intimidation, retaliation, and obstruction" related to the ongoing case involving "hush money" paid by Trump to Stormy Daniels.

The case came before Vyskocil on April 11. On the same day, she denied Bragg's request for emergency relief and set a hearing for April 19, 2023. Jordan revealed that a "field hearing", in which witnesses would be called, was to be held prior to this, on April 17 at the Jacob K. Javits Federal Building, close to Bragg's office in Manhattan. At the April 19 district court hearing, Vyskocil ruled that she had no legal standing to block the subpoena and denied Bragg a requested stay of proceedings pending appeal. The same day, following an emergency motion by Bragg, the United States Court of Appeals for the Second Circuit granted an administrative stay "so that a three-judge panel may consider the motion seeking a stay pending appeal of the district court’s order." On April 21, Bragg dropped his appeal after reaching an agreement with Jordan that allowed the subpoena against Pomerantz, while protecting the District Attorney's privileges and interests. Pomerantz will be deposed on May 12.

== Memberships ==
She was a member of the Federalist Society from 1998 to 2005.

== Awards and recognition ==
Vyskocil has been ranked as one of the "Top Ten Women Litigators in the United States" by Benchmark Litigation. In 2016, she received a "Top Women in Law Award" from the New York Law Journal. She has been recognized as a litigation leader by Chambers, Legal 500, Who's Who Legal and America's Leading Business Lawyers, and Law360.

Legal offices
Preceded by Loretta Preska	Judge of the United States District Court for the Southern District of New York; 2019–present	Incumbent
