= Luis Yanza =

Ecuadorian environmental activist

- Born: 1962 (age 63–64); Gualaceo
- Citizenship: Ecuadorian
- Organization: Amazon Defense Coalition
- Awards: Goldman Environmental Prize (2008)

Luis Yanza (born 1962 in Gualaceo) is an environmental activist from Ecuador, of Cofán descent. He serves as president of the Frente de Defensa de la Amazonia (Amazon Defense Front), an NGO representing the interests of the campesinos and indigenous peoples in Ecuador.

== Chevron Litigation ==
Yanza was involved in an organization called the Amazon Defense Front (ADF) where he was an executive secretary. He helped co-found ADF because he was very involved in the recovery of the environment.

In June 1992, Chevron, a leading oil company in Ecuador, left their stakes of oil. After Chevron’s departure, several Ecuadorian environmental activists demanded monetary compensation for the negative health and environmental effects Chevron had on the Amazon. Yanza was at the forefront of this environmental push, and at the end of 1993, peasants and indigenous Kichwas, Secoyas, and Cofánes filed a class-action lawsuit against Chevron first in Ecuador Court with Steven Donziger’s support. Yanza spoke on the trial, stating that the “trial is not about accidental damages. We’re talking about harm to people and the environment that was done in a deliberate manner.” Eventually, the Ecuador Court ruled in favor of the plaintiffs and Chevron was ordered to pay $9.5 billion to the Amazon Defense Coalition as repercussions for their environmental damage.

However, Chevron appealed for the case, stating that the Ecuador judge was bribed, and the trial was unfair. The appeal was held in the New York District Court, and Chevron won the first appeal with a first-level US trial judge without a jury. The witness Chevron produced for this appeal had stated that he perjured during the trial. Donzinger, who was under house arrest during the pre-trial for a misdemeanor criminal contempt charge, was the one accused of racketeering the Ecuador case by Chevron. As of 2021, Chevron has avoided paying the Amazon Defense Front the $9.5 billion they owed after the Ecuadorian case which is why the case gets its nickname “Amazon Chernobyl.”

== Honors ==
Yanza received the Goldman Environment Prize in 2008, along with Pablo Fajardo Mendoza. The two have been organizing indigenous communities in Ecuador to fight against international oil companies, in order to clean up devastated areas in the Ecuadorian jungle, which has become polluted from years of oil production.

Yanza and Fajardo's publication of the environmental effects from oil production has led to stronger environmental protection laws in Ecuador.
