= Gerard Louis Goettel =

American judge (1928–2011)

Senior Judge of the United States District Court for the Southern District of New York
- In office August 5, 1993 – December 19, 2011

Judge of the United States District Court for the Southern District of New York
- In office March 30, 1976 – August 5, 1993
- Appointed by: Gerald Ford
- Preceded by: Arnold Bauman
- Succeeded by: Lewis A. Kaplan

Magistrate Judge of the United States District Court for the Southern District of New York
- In office 1971–1976

Personal details
- Born: Gerard Louis Goettel; August 5, 1928 New York City, New York, U.S.
- Died: December 19, 2011 (aged 83) Danbury, Connecticut, U.S.
- Education: Duke University (BA); Columbia University (JD)

Gerard Louis Goettel (August 5, 1928 – December 19, 2011) was a United States district judge of the United States District Court for the Southern District of New York.

== Education and career ==
Born on August 5, 1928, in New York City, Goettel received a Bachelor of Arts degree from Duke University in 1950. He received a Juris Doctor from Columbia Law School in 1955. He was a United States Coast Guard lieutenant from 1951 to 1953. He was an Assistant United States Attorney for the Southern District of New York from 1955 to 1958. He was deputy chief of the United States Attorney General's Special Group on Organized Crime from 1958 to 1959. He was in private practice of law in New York City from 1959 to 1962. He was counsel for the New York Life Insurance Company from 1962 to 1968. He was in private practice of law in New York City from 1968 to 1969. He was associate general counsel for the Overmyer Company from 1969 to 1971.

=== Federal judicial service ===
Goettel was a United States magistrate judge of the United States District Court for the Southern District of New York from 1971 to 1976. Goettel was nominated by President Gerald Ford on March 2, 1976, to a seat on the United States District Court for the Southern District of New York vacated by Judge Arnold Bauman. He was confirmed by the United States Senate on March 26, 1976, and received his commission on March 30, 1976. He assumed senior status on August 5, 1993, serving in that status until his death on December 19, 2011, in Danbury, Connecticut.

Legal offices
Preceded by Arnold Bauman	Judge of the United States District Court for the Southern District of New York; 1976–1993	Succeeded by Lewis A. Kaplan
