= Amazonia for Sale =

- Directed by: Facundo López
- Produced by: Alejandro Parellada
- Distributed by: Ore Media
- Release date: 2010
- Running time: 35 minutes
- Country: Peru
- Languages: Spanish; Aguaruna; English subtitles

Amazonia for Sale is a 2010 Peruvian documentary film about the struggle of the Peruvian indigenous peoples Awajún for the preservation of their lands and the survival of their people and culture. The documentary was produced by Ore Media, the International Work Group for Indigenous Affairs (IWGIA) and the Organization for the Development of Border Communities of the Cenepa River (ODECOFROC), a group made up of 56 Awajun and Wampis communities.

== Overview ==
The documentary describes how the Awajún people have inhabited the Amazon rainforest since immemorial times, living in harmony with nature, how they have fought against invaders of the colonial era and how they maintained their culture integrity in the face of Christian missionaries. This ecological balance is now being threatened by governmental and private interests. The documentary describes how national and international companies, promoted by the state in the name of progress and economic development, are exploiting indigenous lands for mineral, timber and oil resources.

The documentary tells the story of the Awajún people’s resistance and struggle for their territory, both now and in the future, seeking to avoid succumbing to the fate of many of the Latin America’s native peoples.

== See also ==
- 2009 Peruvian political crisis
- The Coconut Revolution
- Crude
