= Steven Donziger =

American attorney (born 1961)

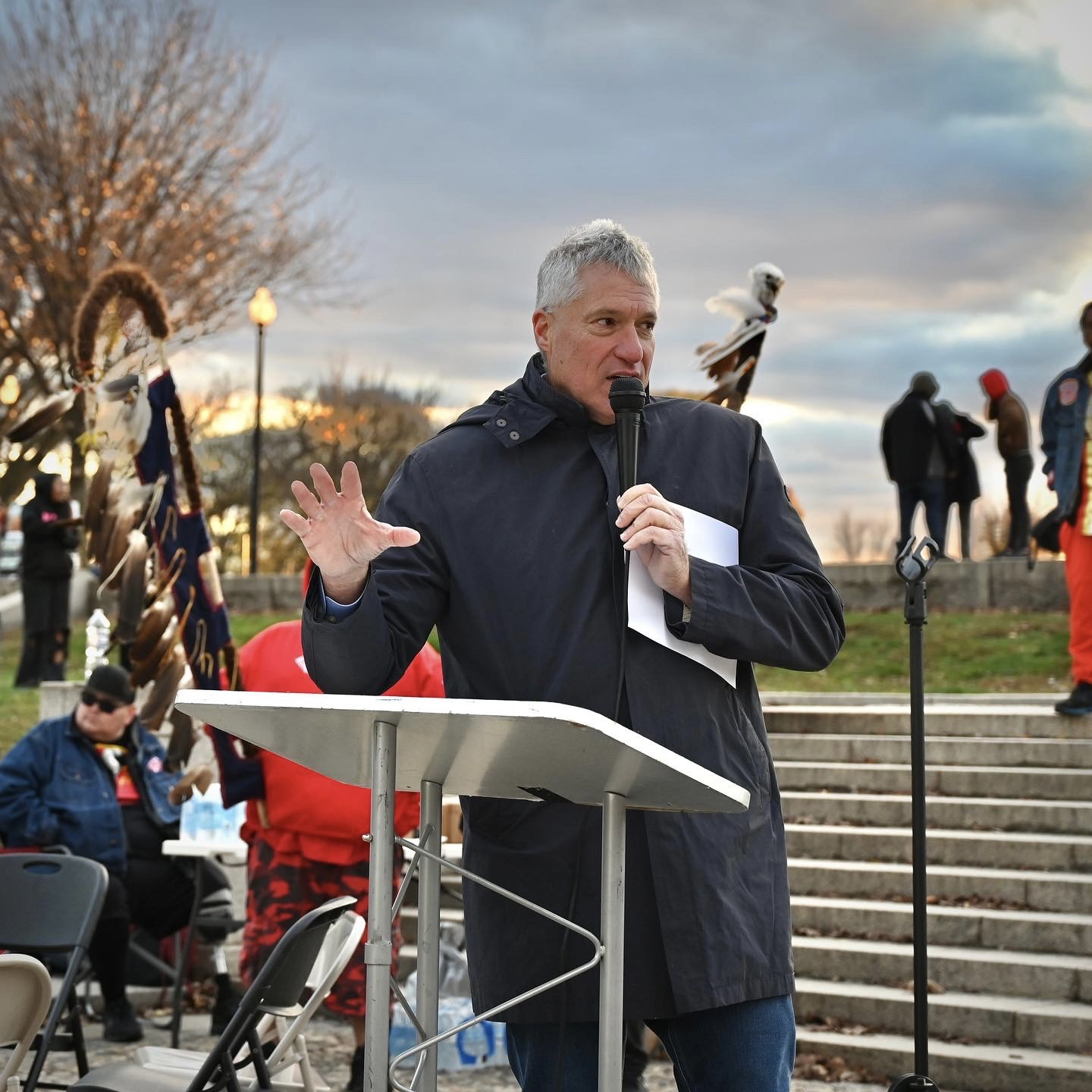
- Donziger in 2022
- Born: September 14, 1961 (age 65); Jacksonville, Florida, U.S.
- Education: American University (BA); Harvard University (JD)
- Occupation: Lawyer (disbarred)
- Criminal charges: Criminal contempt of court
- Criminal penalty: 6 months imprisonment

Steven Robert Donziger (born September 14, 1961) is an American former attorney known for his legal battles with Chevron, particularly Aguinda v. Texaco, Inc. and other cases in which he represented over 30,000 farmers and Indigenous people who allegedly suffered environmental damage and health problems caused by oil drilling in the Lago Agrio oil field of Ecuador. The Ecuadorian court awarded the plaintiffs $9.5 billion ($13.4 billion in 2025 dollars) in damages, which led Chevron to withdraw its assets from Ecuador and launch legal action against Donziger in the US. In 2011, Chevron filed a RICO (anti-corruption) suit against Donziger in New York City. The case was heard by US District Judge Lewis A. Kaplan, who determined that the ruling of the Ecuadorian court could not be enforced in the US because it was procured by fraud, bribery, and racketeering activities. As a result of this case, Donziger was disbarred from practicing law in New York in 2018.

Donziger was placed under house arrest in August 2019 while awaiting trial on charges of criminal contempt of court, which arose during his appeal against Kaplan's RICO decision, when he refused to turn over electronic devices he owned to Chevron's forensics experts. In July 2021, US District Judge Loretta Preska found him guilty, and Donziger was sentenced to 6 months in jail in October 2021. While Donziger was under house arrest in 2020, twenty-nine Nobel laureates described the actions taken by Chevron against him as "judicial harassment." Human rights campaigners called Chevron's actions an example of a strategic lawsuit against public participation (SLAPP). In April 2021, six members of the Congressional Progressive Caucus demanded that the Department of Justice review Donziger's case. In September 2021, the United Nations High Commissioner for Human Rights stated that the pre-trial detention imposed on Donziger was illegal and called for his release. Having spent 45 days in prison and a combined total of 993 days under house arrest, Donziger was released on April 25, 2022.

In June 2022, a federal appeals court affirmed Donziger's criminal contempt conviction. In March 2023, the Supreme Court declined to hear further appeals.

== Early life, family and education ==
Donziger was born in 1961 to Hester (née Koota) and Michael J. Donziger. His maternal grandfather was Aaron E. Koota, the Brooklyn District Attorney from 1964 to 1968 and later Justice of the New York State Supreme Court from 1968 to 1976. His mother, a social activist, raised him in a Jewish community in Jacksonville, Florida, and he attended The Bolles School. She took him to picket in support of César Chávez's Salad Bowl strike.

Donziger studied history at American University where he also wrote for his college newspaper. He graduated from Harvard Law School in 1991.

== Career ==
After graduating from college, Donziger worked as a journalist. His first job was in the United Press International bureau in Managua, after which he freelanced in Nicaragua for The Fort Lauderdale News, the Toronto Star, and The Atlanta Journal-Constitution. He also founded Project Due Process which offered legal services to Cubans who arrived in the US in the Mariel boatlift.

After working as a journalist for three years, Donziger went to Harvard Law School. He graduated from law school in 1991 and worked as a public defender in Washington, D.C. In 1991, he visited Iraq as part of a mission that produced a report on the impact of bombing on civilians during the first Gulf War. The report was adopted by the United Nations. Donziger was the editor of The Real War on Crime: The Report of the National Criminal Justice Commission, published in 1996 by Harper Perennial. The book described the role of media in increasing fear of crime, racial injustice in the criminal justice system and argues against mandatory minimum sentences.

=== Class action lawsuit against Chevron ===
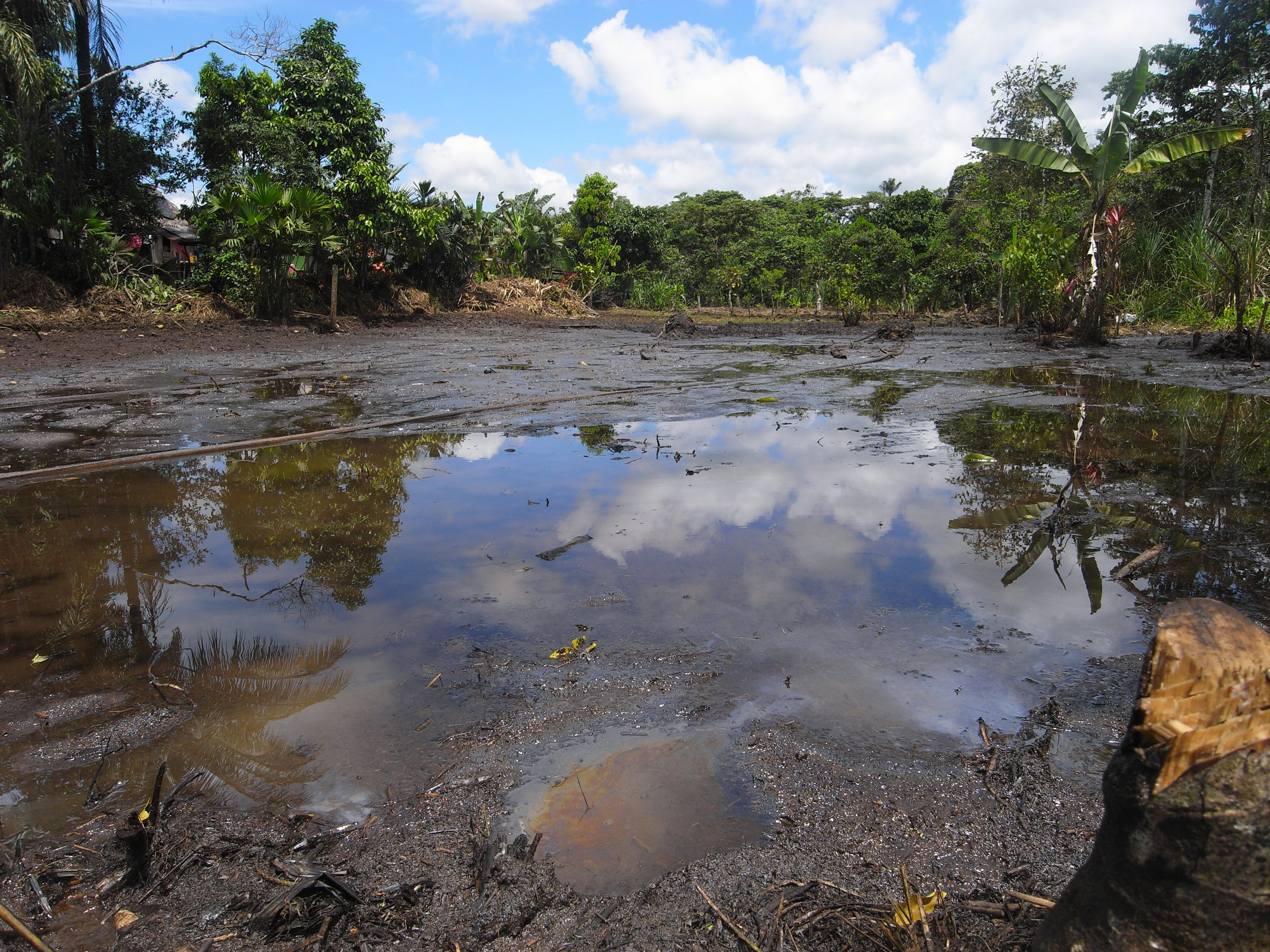
Oil pollution in Lago Agrio, November 2007

Starting in the 1970s, Texaco conducted oil drilling operations in the Amazon in partnership with Ecuador's national oil company, Petroecuador. In the 1990s Texaco came to a $40 million agreement with Ecuador to clean up some of the resultant pollution, and was released from liability.

Donziger was asked by Frente de Defensa de la Amazonía (FDA) to help win compensation for the pollution and health effects caused by oil drilling in the Lago Agrio oil field, a region that became known as the "Amazon Chernobyl". He visited Ecuador in 1993, where he says he saw "what honestly looked like an apocalyptic disaster," including children walking barefoot down oil-covered roads and jungle lakes filled with oil. In 1993, after he visited Ecuador, Donziger and other attorneys brought a class-action lawsuit in New York against Texaco on behalf of over 30,000 farmers and Indigenous people from the Amazon region. Since the plaintiffs had no money, Donziger, with FDA support, funded the case by selling shares to investors, offering a small part of any eventual settlement. The lawyers chose to file in New York because at the time Texaco's headquarters were in New York. The lawsuit charged that Texaco's oil drilling in the Amazon had resulted in massive contamination. Chevron bought Texaco in 2001 and argued that Texaco had cleaned up its area of operations and that its partner, Petroecuador, was responsible for any remaining pollution. Chevron requested that the case be tried in Ecuador and, in 2002, the US court dismissed the plaintiffs case based on forum non conveniens and ruled that Ecuador had jurisdiction. The US court exacted a promise from Chevron that it would accept the decision of the Ecuadorian courts.

When the case moved to Ecuador, Donziger conducted a public relations campaign to inform Ecuadoreans about the pollution of the Amazon. He said that "the indigenous people would never get a fair trial in Ecuador if they did not illuminate what had happened to them and get public support". Donziger appeared in the 2009 documentary film Crude which explored a two-year period in the case. A provincial Ecuadorean court found Chevron guilty in 2011 and awarded the plaintiffs $18 billion in damages. The decision was affirmed by three appellate courts including Ecuador's highest court, the National Court of Justice, although the damages were reduced to $9.5 billion.

To avoid paying the damages awarded by the court in Ecuador, Chevron moved its assets out of the country, leading the plaintiffs to seek enforcement actions in Canada, Brazil, and Argentina for confiscation of Chevron's assets. An editorial in The Wall Street Journal stated that appeals courts in Argentina and Brazil's Superior Court of Justice rejected Donziger's petitions to have the Ecuadorean judgment enforced. In 2017, a Canadian court held that the Ecuadorean plaintiffs could not be awarded assets of Chevron's Canadian subsidiary as the subsidiary was legally distinct from its US parent. In 2019, the Ecuadorean plaintiffs ended their Canadian lawsuit against Chevron.

In 2018, the Permanent Court of Arbitration in The Hague ruled that the $9.5 billion judgment in Ecuador was marked by fraud and corruption and "should not be recognised or enforced by the courts of other States." The amount Ecuador must pay to Chevron to compensate for damages is yet to be determined. The panel also stated that the corruption was limited to one judge, not the entire Ecuadorean legal system.

== Counter-litigation against Donziger ==
Chevron stated that a scene in the documentary film Crude presented at the Sundance Film Festival showed an environmental scientist present at a legal strategy meeting of plaintiffs' lawyers; the same scientist was later appointed by the Ecuadorian court as an ostensibly impartial expert to write a report on technical issues, but the scene was cut from the theatrical release. Chevron lawyers wanted to know what other potentially compromising scenes were left out by the film's director, Joe Berlinger. On May 6, 2010, federal judge Lewis Kaplan sided with a petition submitted by Chevron and ruled that Berlinger turn over more than 600 hours of original footage created during the film's production. Chevron had sought to subpoena the footage as part of the ongoing lawsuit discussed in the film. Berlinger's legal team has maintained that the footage is protected by reporters' privilege and appealed the court's decision.

In his appeal, Berlinger stated that he was a highly awarded and respected independent filmmaker, that he was independent of Donziger, and argued that he had in fact gone to great lengths to make Crude a balanced portrayal. Berlinger acknowledged that he had "tweaked" some scenes at Donziger's request. The scene showing the environmental scientist at the legal strategy session had been cut from the theatrical release (but not the online version for Netflix) after one of the plaintiff lawyers objected to Berlinger that showing the scene was "so serious we could lose everything". The US 2nd Circuit Court of Appeals narrowed the scope slightly (Berlinger had to turn over 500 hours of outtakes, rather than 600), but in 2011 upheld the lower court ruling against Berlinger, Judge Pierre Leval writing for the court: "Those who do not retain independence as to what they will publish but are subservient to the objectives of others who have a stake in what will be published have either a weaker privilege or none at all."

In 2011, Chevron filed a civil RICO (Racketeer Influenced and Corrupt Organizations Act) suit against Donziger in New York City, accusing him of bribing an Ecuadorean judge, ghostwriting the damages judgment against it, and "fixing" scientific studies. Chevron's civil suit initially sought $60 billion in damages which would have required a trial by jury. Chevron removed the request for damages two weeks prior to trial, allowing the case to be tried by judge alone. Chevron stated that it wanted to focus "the RICO case on obtaining injunctive relief against the furtherance of Donziger's extortionate scheme against the company". US District Judge Lewis A. Kaplan was assigned as the judge.

In 2014, Donziger estimated that the legal fees Chevron was paying to appeal had already exceeded $2 billion. In 2021, Chevron estimated its legal fees at nearly $1 billion.

=== Kaplan's 2014 ruling in the RICO case ===
In 2014, Kaplan ruled that the judgment in Ecuador was invalid because Donziger had achieved it through offenses against legal ethics, including racketeering, extortion, wire fraud, money laundering, obstruction of justice, judicial bribery, coercion, witness tampering, and arranging for expert's reports to be ghostwritten. Kaplan said the process in Ecuador was "not fair or impartial and did not comport with the requirements of due process" and was "not entitled to recognition". As a result of Kaplan's ruling, Chevron could not be forced to pay the Ecuadorian award in the United States. In subsequent defenses of the ruling, Kaplan referred to the Ecuadorians involved in the class action suit as "so-called plaintiffs". Kaplan described Donziger's conduct as "criminal" in his 2014 ruling, but the US Attorney's office for the Southern District of New York declined to prosecute him.

Donziger said that because Judge Kaplan failed to disclose that he held shares in three mutual funds which in turn held shares in Chevron at the time of the ruling, he should have recused himself. Professor Stephen Gillers, an expert on legal ethics at New York University Law School, stated: "Kaplan's ownership of shares in mutual funds that have shares of Chevron is not a ‘financial interest’ in Chevron. Mutual funds are, along with government securities, viewed as the surest way for a judge to invest without a risk of recusal."

The case relied in large part on the testimony of Alberto Guerra, a former Ecuadorean judge whom Chevron had moved to the United States from Ecuador in 2013 for safety reasons. Chevron paid for immigration lawyers for Guerra and his family and provided him with a monthly salary of $12,000 for housing and living expenses. In the RICO trial, Guerra alleged that Donziger had arranged for him to ghostwrite the verdict that was delivered against Chevron in Ecuador. Guerra stated that the judge who heard the case signed the verdict which Guerra had prepared and the two shared payment of $500,000 from the plaintiffs, led by Donziger. In Kaplan's conclusion to the RICO case, he highlighted this as primary evidence for the racketeering charge. In his judgment, Kaplan wrote that "Guerra on many occasions has acted deceitfully and broken the law ... but that does not necessarily mean that it should be disregarded wholesale". He found that the "evidence leads to one conclusion: Guerra told the truth regarding the bribe and the essential fact as to who wrote the Judgment." In 2015, Guerra testified to an international tribunal that he had lied and changed his story multiple times in the RICO trial. Guerra admitted that there was no evidence supporting the allegation that Donziger bribed him or paid him for delivering a ghostwritten judgment, and that large parts of Guerra's testimony in the RICO case were either exaggerated or untrue. Kaplan also ordered Donziger to pay Chevron $800,000 on the RICO claim and barred Donziger from selling shares in the Ecuadorian judgment to investors.

In 2016, the Second Circuit Court of Appeals declined to consider Guerra's admissions and unanimously upheld Kaplan's ruling.

In March 2021, the Second Circuit Court of Appeals heard an appeal against prior court orders made by Kaplan against Donziger in a civil contempt action brought by Chevron. The appeals court ruled that Kaplan's decision, which prevented Donziger from financing his court case by selling shares in any future award, was unenforceable. The appeals court also vacated Chevron's request for $4.1 million in damages and a $660,000 sanction against Donziger. Other aspects of Kaplan's original civil contempt ruling were upheld.

=== Disbarment in New York and District of Columbia ===
Donziger was suspended from practicing law in New York in July 2018, based on rulings by US District Judge Lewis A. Kaplan in the Chevron case. The state bar association appointed an independent referee to investigate. The referee recommended Donziger's reinstatement in February 2020, saying "The extent of [Donziger's] pursuit by Chevron is so extravagant, and at this point so unnecessary and punitive, [that] while not a factor in my recommendation, [it] is nonetheless background to it". A state appeals court ruled in August 2020 that the referee had been "too dismissive" of the misconduct that Kaplan had alleged, and disbarred Donziger in New York. 186 AD3d 27 (1st Dept. 2020). Martin Garbus, Donziger's lawyer, said the decision deprives Ecuadorians represented by Donziger of their main advocate and singles Donziger out because he "threatens Chevron and the fossil fuel industry".The New York Court of Appeals, the state's highest court, twice declined to review the disbarment. 2020-676 and 2021-554. Based on the New York action, he was disbarred in the District of Columbia on July 21, 2022.

=== Criminal contempt charge ===
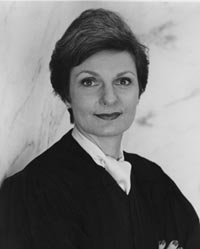
Senior District Judge Loretta Preska

As part of the appeal process after the initial ruling, Kaplan ordered Donziger to submit his computer, phones, and other electronic devices to a neutral forensic expert to search for his assets and other evidence relating to the Ecuador judgment. Donziger refused, arguing that doing so would violate the attorney–client privilege of his clients, and appealed the order on constitutional grounds. While Donziger's appeal against the order was pending, Kaplan charged him with six counts of criminal contempt of court. The contempt charges allege that Donziger failed to comply with Kaplan's orders to submit his electronic devices and passport and to drop attempts to collect on the award against Chevron. In a move described as "virtually unprecedented" by The Intercept, Kaplan appointed a private law firm, Seward & Kissel, to prosecute Donziger after the Southern District Court of New York declined to do so. In Jacobin magazine, David Sirota and Walker Bragman wrote that Seward & Kissel has represented Chevron directly as recently as 2018. Chris Hedges wrote that neither Kaplan nor Seward & Kissel disclosed that Chevron had been a client.

Rather than using the standard random assignment process for choosing a judge to preside over Donziger's trial for criminal contempt, Kaplan chose senior District Judge Loretta Preska. Preska had served on the advisory board of the Federalist Society, to which Chevron (along with other large American companies like Verizon, Google, Facebook, Time Warner, and others) had contributed at least $50,000 in 2012. In August 2019, Preska sentenced Donziger to home detention while awaiting trial. He was required to wear a GPS-equipped ankle bracelet. Preska ordered Donziger to post a bail bond of $800,000, which is a record for a misdemeanor case in the US. In May 2020, Preska ruled that Donziger's case would not be heard by a jury, which Donziger had requested. On May 18, 2020, Preska refused a request from Donziger's lawyer to allow Donziger to leave his apartment for three hours a day because she regarded him as a flight risk. The US District court disqualified two of Donziger's attorneys from appearing for him in the contempt trial. In August 2020, after two other attorneys were unable to appear in the trial, Preska ordered Andrew Frisch, Donziger's former lead defense attorney, to represent him. Martin Garbus, who also represents Donziger but was unable to attend the trial, said a trial with Frisch would not be "a constitutionally protected case" and that "Donziger is being forced to go to trial with a lawyer who doesn't want to be in the case, who doesn't get along with Donziger, and claims that before Donziger goes ahead with the trial he should pay him additional moneys".

The contempt case was scheduled to begin in September 2020. Citing coronavirus concerns, Donziger's fourth lawyer, Lauren Regan, requested in late October that the civil trial be rescheduled for a third time. The trial was rescheduled to begin on November 9, then delayed until January 2021 for Donziger to have legal representation. In the face of objections to holding the trial virtually, Preska rescheduled the trial to take place in person on May 10, 2021. Donziger asked Preska to allow his criminal contempt trial to be livestreamed via Zoom because of restrictions on public attendance due to the COVID-19 pandemic and significant public interest in the case. Preska rejected Donziger's request and Donziger then asked that proceedings be televised. This request was also denied.

On July 26, 2021, after almost two years of home detention, Donziger was found guilty by Judge Preska on all six contempt charges. Judge Preska wrote that the contempt case had nothing to do with any responsibility Chevron might have for pollution in Ecuador's rainforest. On October 1, 2021, Judge Preska sentenced Donziger to the maximum sentence of six months in prison. Preska said that Donziger had not shown contrition and "It seems that only the proverbial two-by-four between the eyes will instill in him any respect for the law". Donziger appealed the sentence, which he described as "another example ... of the punitive nature of what's happening. It's almost unheard of for someone convicted of a misdemeanor in the United States not to be let out pending his or her appeal". A federal appellate court rejected Donziger's request for bail while his appeal was pending. He reported to prison on October 27, 2021.

On December 9, 2021, Donziger was released from prison to serve the rest of his sentence under house arrest per a pandemic-related early release program.

In January 2022, The Nation wrote that it had obtained documents showing that Chevron, its law firm Gibson, Dunn & Crutcher, and the private prosecutor appointed by Kaplan to prosecute Donziger, had collaborated in conducting the criminal contempt case. At least 32 meetings and numerous phone calls were held between the private prosecutor and lawyers from Gibson Dunn, though these did "not show evidence of legal wrong-doing". Gibson Dunn said the time it spent consulting with the prosecution team was donated and not billed to Chevron. In discussing the cost of the criminal contempt prosecution against him, Donziger said "The total cost of my prosecution—for a misdemeanor—will be somewhere between $5 million and $10 million. A normal misdemeanor is like a $5,000 prosecution".

On February 4, 2022, a petition was filed with the U.S. Supreme Court by Harvard Law School professor Charles Nesson, asking the court to review a 2020 New York state court ruling that faulted Donziger's "egregious" misconduct in winning the judgment against Chevron. On March 27, 2023, the Supreme Court declined to review the case, letting it stand.

On February 10, 2022, Donziger was forced to report to a halfway house after his ankle bracelet triggered an incident report, according to attorney Ron Kuby. His house arrest ended on April 24.

=== Reactions ===
In 2014, Joe Nocera wrote that Notre Dame law professor and human rights attorney Doug Cassel stated that "Donziger disserved his clients and his cause” by his conduct during the Ecuadorian trial. Nocera stated that an attorney who followed the rules might have been able to get a verdict enforceable in the United States, and an attorney with a realistic view of the case might have been able to get a settlement (and compensation) in a shorter timeframe than the 20 years it took Donziger to win his case in Ecuador (with his clients still having received no compensation). Nocera also said that several reporters who have followed the case for years have come to see Donziger as "a rogue lawyer willing to do virtually anything to win."

In 2018, an editorial in The Wall Street Journal claimed that "Donziger's attempted looting of Chevron for spurious environmental crimes in Ecuador ranks among the biggest legal scams in history". The editorial called Donziger's disbarment "a step toward reining in Mr. Donziger's marauding".

Donziger's contempt charge and house arrest have been harshly condemned by some legal advocates. Lawyer's Rights Watch Canada points out that Donziger has been under house arrest for longer than the six-month maximum sentence that contempt of court carries. Harvard Law School professor Charles Nesson criticized Chevron and Kaplan, stating that the corruption and bribery charges were a "means to protect the oil company from having to answer for its degradation of the Amazon". In 2020, a group of twenty-nine Nobel laureates condemned "judicial harassment" by Chevron and urged the release of Donziger. Human rights campaigners described the treatment of Donziger as an example of a strategic lawsuit against public participation (SLAPP), which are used to censor, intimidate, and silence critics by burdening them with the cost of a legal defense until they abandon their criticism or opposition.

The European Parliament requested that the Congressional Subcommittee on the Constitution, Civil Rights, and Civil Liberties investigate Chevron's treatment of Donziger as "not consistent with what has traditionally been the strong support in the United States for the rule of law generally and for protection for human rights defenders in particular".

In a March 2020 article in The Nation, James North wrote that "[t]he mainstream press has largely ignored the legal attacks against Donziger, but Chevron's counteroffensive could endanger human rights and environmental work around the world". In an August 2020 article entitled "How Corporate Tyranny Works", Chris Hedges detailed the measures taken by Chevron to pressure mainstream media outlets, including Fox News, GQ, and The New York Times, to drop stories about the Chevron and Donziger litigation. In an October 2021 article entitled "The Anonymous Executioners of the Corporate State", Hedges described the prosecution of Donziger as a "show trial" similar to those carried out by "tyrannies of the past", and compared his case to that of Julian Assange, saying "they are designed to send a message. All who defy corporate power and the national security state will be lynched."

In July 2020, Simon Taylor, director of Global Witness said that the treatment of Donziger "is intended to intimidate the rest of us, to chill the work of other environmental and corporate accountability advocates".

In February 2021, a law student boycott against Seward & Kissel began, involving around 300 law students from around 50 law schools. In a letter, the students state that the firm has a conflict of interest in prosecuting Donziger in the criminal contempt case, saying: "We, the undersigned law students, refuse to consider employment with the firm until it withdraws from its conflicted position as Chevron's private prosecutor". The student group, Law Students for Climate Accountability, launched a similar boycott in April against Gibson Dunn, a law firm that has also lobbied to keep Donziger confined alongside other climate-related campaigns, including litigation and advocacy in support of the Dakota Access Pipeline and Koch Industries.

On April 27, 2021, Democrats Jim McGovern, Cori Bush, Rashida Tlaib, Jamaal Bowman, Alexandria Ocasio-Cortez, and Jamie Raskin wrote a letter calling for oversight by Attorney General Merrick Garland out of "deep concerns that the unprecedented nature of Mr. Donziger's pending legal case is tied to his previous work against Chevron." This was later followed by a letter addressed to Roslynn Mauskopf from Massachusetts Senator Ed Markey and Rhode Island Senator Sheldon Whitehouse.

Fairness & Accuracy in Reporting has been critical of the US media's coverage of Donziger's trial and house arrest. In July 2021, it wrote that the New York Times had not published an article about Donziger since 2014 and that articles in the US corporate media largely favored Chevron. It quoted an interview given by Donziger to Breakthrough News in which he said, "No matter what you think of me or Judge Kaplan, isn't it newsworthy that an American lawyer is under house arrest for two years on a misdemeanor?"

In October 2021, the United Nations Working Group on Arbitrary Detention wrote that Donziger's two years of house arrest was arbitrary, that his detainment was without legal basis, and that he had been denied a fair trial. The Working Group criticized Kaplan and Preska for showing "a staggering lack of objectivity and impartiality". Amnesty International asked US authorities "to promptly implement the decision by the UN Working Group on Arbitrary Detention" and release Donziger from detention.

Writing in The Guardian newspaper in February 2022, Erin Brockovich contrasts her experiences to those of Donziger.

== Personal life ==
Donziger is married and has a son. The family lives in a two-bedroom apartment on the Upper West Side of Manhattan.
