= The Coconut Revolution =

2001 film

- Directed by: Dom Rotheroe
- Produced by: Michael Chamberlain
- Distributed by: Stampede
- Release date: 2001
- Running time: 50 min
- Country: United Kingdom
- Language: English

The Coconut Revolution is a 2001 documentary film about the struggle of the indigenous peoples of Bougainville Island during the Bougainville Civil War. The movement is described as the "world's first successful eco-revolution" and has drawn parallels with the conflict depicted in the 2009 film, Avatar.

== Overview ==
The movie tells the story of the successful uprising of the indigenous peoples of Bougainville Island against the Papua New Guinea army and the mining plans of the mining corporation Rio Tinto Zinc (RTZ) to exploit their natural resources. The documentary reveals how the Bougainville Revolutionary Army (BRA) managed to overcome the marine blockade strategy used by the Papuan army by using coconut oil as fuel for their vehicles.

It received funding from the Open Society Foundations, which thence became the Sundance Film Fund.

== Awards ==
Awards attributed to this documentary include:

Winner

- Grand Prize, FICA Festival of Environmental Film, Brazil
- British Environment and Media (BEMA) Awards Richard Keefe Memorial Award – WWF
- Golden Kite, Best Documentary, Mar del Plata, Argentina
- Silver Kite, Best Film for Young People, Argentina

Runner-up

- BEMA Best Documentary
- Amnesty International UK Media Awards 2001, Best Documentary
- One World Media Awards 2001, TV Documentary

== See also ==
- Bougainville – Our Island Our Fight
- Amazonia for Sale
