= Lewis A. Kaplan =

American judge (born 1944)

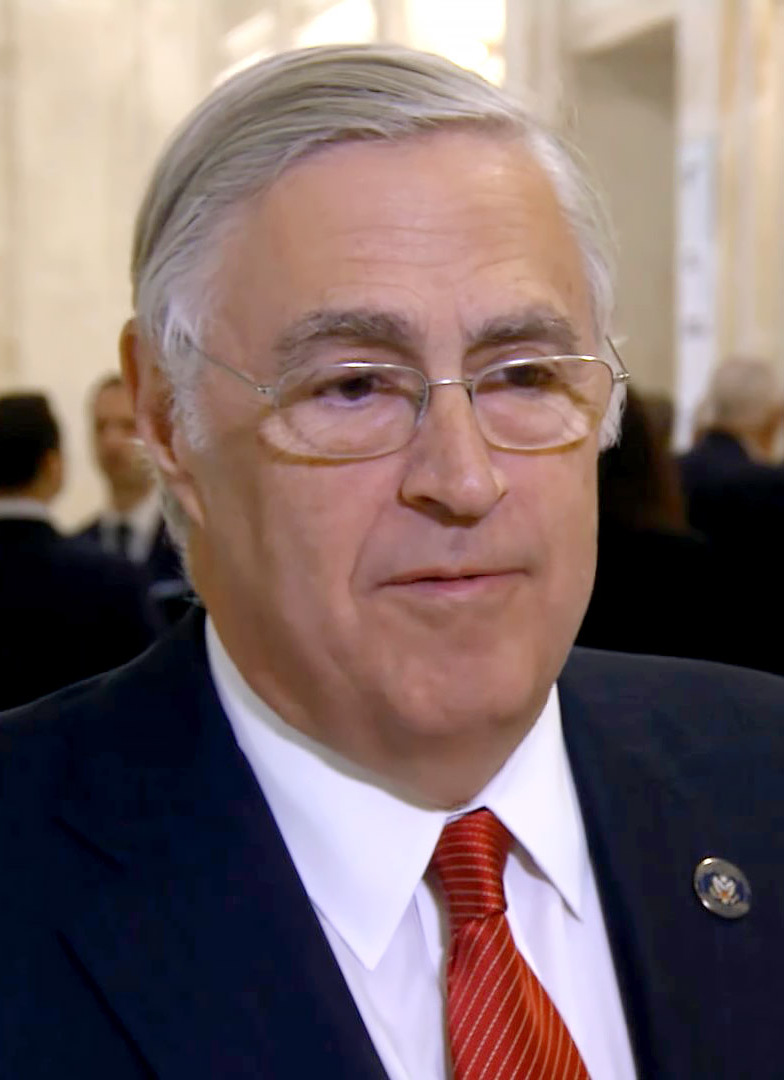
- Kaplan in 2014

Senior Judge of the United States District Court for the Southern District of New York
- Incumbent
- Assumed office February 1, 2011

Judge of the United States District Court for the Southern District of New York
- In office August 10, 1994 – February 1, 2011
- Appointed by: Bill Clinton
- Preceded by: Gerard Louis Goettel
- Succeeded by: Ronnie Abrams

Personal details
- Born: 1944 (age 81–82) New York City, U.S.
- Spouse: Lesley Oelsner (m. 2004)
- Education: University of Rochester (BA); Harvard University (JD)

Lewis Avins Kaplan (born 1944) is an American lawyer and jurist who serves as a senior United States district judge of the United States District Court for the Southern District of New York. He was the presiding judge in a number of cases involving high-profile defendants, including E. Jean Carroll v. Donald J. Trump, Giuffre v. Prince Andrew, United States v. Bankman-Fried, and trials of al-Qaeda terrorists such as Ahmed Ghailani.

== Education, career, personal life ==
Kaplan was born in 1944 in Staten Island, New York. He received a Bachelor of Arts degree from the University of Rochester in 1966 and a Juris Doctor from Harvard Law School in 1969.

After law school, Kaplan was a law clerk for Judge Edward McEntee of the United States Court of Appeals for the First Circuit, from 1969 to 1970. He then entered private practice at the law firm Paul, Weiss, Rifkind, Wharton & Garrison, becoming a partner in 1977. From 1982 to 1983, he served as a Special Master for the United States District Court for the Southern District of New York. During his time in the private sector, Kaplan represented Phillip Morris.

He married former New York Times reporter and former vice president of Random House Lesley Oelsner on February 29, 2004.

=== Federal judicial service ===
On May 5, 1994, Kaplan was nominated by President Bill Clinton to a seat on the United States District Court for the Southern District of New York vacated by Judge Gerard Louis Goettel. He was confirmed by the United States Senate on August 9, 1994, and received his commission on August 10, 1994. He took senior status on February 1, 2011.

=== Notable cases ===
==== Guantanamo detainees ====
Kaplan presided over the first case in which charges against Guantanamo captives were laid in a civilian court. On February 9, 2010, Kaplan ordered Ahmed Ghailani's prosecution to review the record of Ghailani's detention in the CIA's network of black sites.

According to The New York Times, any materials that show the decisions "were for a purpose other than national security," must be turned over to Ghailani's lawyers. He denied a motion to dismiss the charges on the grounds that due to Ghailani's long extrajudicial detention he was denied the constitutional right to a speedy trial, ruling that his extended incarceration had no adverse impact on Mr. Ghailani's ability to defend himself. This cleared the way for federal prosecutors to try him for his suspected role in Al Qaeda's 1998 bombings of U.S. embassies in Kenya and Tanzania. The New York Times reported that Kaplan's ruling could set a precedent for the cases of other Guantanamo captives, who, like Ghailani, are transferred to the civilian justice system. On January 25, 2011, Kaplan sentenced Ghailani to life and called the attacks "horrific" and saying the deaths and damage they caused far outweighs "any and all considerations that have been advanced on behalf of the defendant." He also ordered Ghailani to pay $33 million as restitution.

==== Organized crime ====
Working in New York City, Kaplan had been the judge in a number of federal racketeering cases involving Mafia members. In April 2010, Kaplan was assigned to preside over the cases of 14 Gambino crime family members arrested on charges, among others, of racketeering, racketeering conspiracy, witness tampering (in the 1992 trial of John Gotti), and sex trafficking of a minor.

In 2016–2017, Kaplan presided over US v. Spoutz, one of the first cases of successful prosecution of attributed artwork in the United States. Eric Spoutz, an art dealer, pleaded guilty to one count of wire fraud related to the sale of falsely attributed artwork accompanied by forged provenance documents. Kaplan sentenced him to 41 months in federal prison and ordered to forfeit the $1.45 million he made from the scheme and pay $154,100 in restitution.

==== Chevron v. Donziger ====
Kaplan presided over and ruled in favor of Chevron's appeal of a major environmental case. It had originally been brought successfully on behalf of Ecuadorian indigenous tribes against Texaco-Chevron. Kaplan granted Chevron's motion barring enforcement of an almost $10 billion judgment awarded by the Ecuadorian courts against the company in February 2011. Lawyers for Chevron argued the ruling was illegitimate due to foul play on the part of the plaintiffs in the case who allegedly introduced fabricated evidence and bribed witnesses and officials involved in the case. Kaplan found there to be overwhelming evidence that the Ecuadorian verdict was the result of a criminal conspiracy spear-headed by the plaintiff's lead attorney, Steven Donziger. In a ruling in July 2019, Kaplan fined Donziger $3.4 million for contempt and for Chevron's legal fees, the largest contempt sanction in US history.

Donziger was unable to satisfy the contempt fine and restitution award so Kaplan ordered he surrender certain personal items of his such as cell phones and computers. These devices were to be handed over to Chevron employees trying to locate any assets Donziger may have concealed. Donziger refused to comply on the grounds doing so would be a breach of attorney-client privilege. In response, Kaplan found Donziger in criminal contempt and referred the case for prosecution. When the SDNY US Attorney's Office declined to pursue the case in August 2019, Kaplan appointed a private law firm, Seward & Kissel to prosecute Donziger.

Donziger has accused Kaplan of displaying a pro-corporate bias in the case. At the hearing, Alberto Guerra, a former Ecuadorian judge, testified for Chevron, claiming Donziger bribed him and others to win the case by fraud. Guerra's testimony was cited by Kaplan as a key factor in his decision. In 2015, Guerra claimed his testimony against Donziger had been largely a lie. According to The Intercept, Kaplan has written favorably about Chevron and "bypassed the standard random assignment process and handpicked someone he knew well, U.S. District Judge Loretta Preska, to oversee the case being prosecuted by the firm he chose." Seward & Kissel partner Rita Glavin claimed that the firm did not have a conflict of interest with regards to the case, even though Seward & Kissel has worked with Chevron at least twice, including as recently as 2018. In September 2020, the National Lawyers Guild and International Association of Democratic Lawyers filed a joint complaint against Kaplan over his treatment of Donziger, alleging that “statements and actions of Judge Kaplan over the last ten years show him to have taken on the role of counsel for Chevron … rather than that of a judge adjudicating a live controversy before him.”

In 2016, the Second Circuit Court of Appeals declined to consider Guerra's admissions and unanimously upheld Kaplan's ruling. In March 2021, the Second Circuit heard another appeal by Donziger against prior court orders made by Kaplan in the civil contempt action brought by Chevron. The appeals court found the order barring Donziger from financing his legal defense by selling shares in any future award to be unenforceable. The court also vacated Chevron's request for $4.1 million in damages and a $660,000 sanction against Donziger. In 2018, the Permanent Court of Arbitration in The Hague ruled that the $9.5 billion judgment in Ecuador was marked by fraud and corruption and "should not be recognised or enforced by the courts of other States." The Court summarized their findings, "the most thorough documentary, video, and testimonial proof of fraud ever put before an arbitral tribunal", that the plaintiffs engaged in blackmail and bribery of Ecuadorian judges that triggered an order to appoint an "expert" friendly to the plaintiffs, that Ecuadorian prosecutors "actively cooperated" with the plaintiffs, who bribed "experts", ghostwrote a report and paid an ex-judge to draft the acting judge's orders—the same judge solicited bribes that Chevron refused to pay.

In August 2020, following a protracted debate, the New York Court of Appeals disbarred Donziger in New York State.

On October 1, 2021, Judge Preska sentenced Donziger to six months in prison. Donziger appealed the decision to the Second Circuit Court of Appeals, but the court denied the appeal in June 2022. In March 2023, the Supreme Court declined to hear the case.

==== Miscellaneous ====
Other well-known cases Kaplan has presided over at the district level include Bridgeman Art Library v. Corel Corp., Universal v. Reimerdes, Five Borough Bicycle Club v. The City of New York, and Crandell v. New York College of Osteopathic Medicine.

In the 2005 case Mannion v. Coors Brewing Co., Kaplan, finding existing case law on what constituted protectable originality in a photograph for copyright purposes, outlined three aspects—rendition, timing, and creation of the subject—that met that criterion and have been used by other courts.

From 2021 to 2022, Kaplan was the presiding judge on matters relating to Giuffre v. Prince Andrew over allegations of sexual assault.

In 2023, Judge Kaplan presided over the civil trial by E. Jean Carroll against Donald Trump for sexual assault and defamation. A jury found Trump liable on September 6, 2023, and set the matter for a damages only trial.

In 2022 and 2023, Kaplan presided over the criminal case against Sam Bankman-Fried over the collapse of the cryptocurrency exchange FTX.

== Awards ==
In 2007, the New York State Bar Association awarded Kaplan the Stanley H. Fuld Award for outstanding contributions to the development of commercial law and jurisprudence in New York. The Federal Bar Council awarded Kaplan the Learned Hand Medal for excellence in federal jurisprudence in 2009.

== See also ==
- List of Jewish American jurists
- Kaplan (surname)

Legal offices
Preceded by Gerard Louis Goettel	Judge of the United States District Court for the Southern District of New York; 1994–2011	Succeeded by Ronnie Abrams
