= Lago Agrio oil field =

Area in the province of Sucumbíos, Ecuador

- Location of the Lago Agrio oil field within Ecuador
- Country: Ecuador
- Region: Sucumbíos
- Location: Nueva Loja
- Offshore/onshore: onshore
- Coordinates: 0°4′28.6″N 76°45′28.5″W
- Operators: TexPet (1967–1990); Petroecuador (1990–...)

Field history
- Discovery: 1967
- Start of production: 1972

Production
- Producing formations: Napo; Hollin

The Lago Agrio oil field is an oil-rich area near the city of Nueva Loja in the province of Sucumbíos, Ecuador. It is located in the Western Oriente Basin. The site's hydrocarbon-bearing formations are the Cretaceous Napo and Hollin formations. Oil was discovered in the area in 1960s. The Lago Agrio field is known internationally for the serious ecological problems that oil development has created there, including water pollution, soil contamination, deforestation and cultural upheaval. Located in Cofan territory near the Colombian border, it is one of twelve production areas that developed when Ecuador began to export petroleum.

In 1993, local residents started a class action lawsuit, Aguinda v. Texaco, Inc. to force former well operator Texaco (acquired by Chevron Corporation in 2001) to clean up the area and provide for the care of the 30,000 inhabitants affected by oil contamination. In February 2011, an Ecuadorian court ordered Chevron to pay $8 billion in compensation. The verdict was later confirmed by the Ecuador Supreme Court in 2013, with the amount fixed to $9.5 billion. Despite having previously insisted to move the process from the New York Court to Ecuadorian tribunals and having accepted jurisdiction there, Chevron Corporation has refused to pay the judgement claiming that the decision was "illegitimate and inapplicable". A ruling deeming the Ecuadorian verdict as unenforceable was issued by a United States court in 2014 and by an appeals court two years later. In 2018 the Permanent Court of Arbitration in The Hague ruled in favor of Chevron and said the 2013 Ecuador Supreme Court case was obtained "through fraud, bribery and corruption."

== Background ==
Prior to the discovery of oil in the Ecuadorian Amazon, economic activity in the region consisted of commercial and subsistence farming. The indigenous Cofan people grew cacao as a cash crop and traditional methods of cacao cultivation remain in use today. The Shuar of eastern Ecuador cultivated sugarcane, oregano, and tree tomatoes among many other plants used for culinary and medicinal purposes.

In 1965, the Ecuadorian government granted 1.4 million hectares in and around the modern province of Sucumbios to the US-based oil company Texaco with a mandate to find and exploit oil reserves in the region. Texaco, operating as a consortium with Gulf oil company, discovered oil in 1966 or 1967. Subsequently, other oil companies such as Gulf, Occidental, and Repsol entered the Ecuadorian oil market. As of 2021, proven reserves in Ecuador amounted to 8.8 billion barrels, the third largest reserve in South America.

In 1971, the government of Ecuador passed the Hydrocarbons Law which forced foreign oil companies to renegotiate previous concessions and contracts, resulting in some 80% of land held by foreign companies being returned to the Ecuadorian state. The state owned oil company CEPE (Corporación Estatal Petrolera Ecuatoriana) gradually increased its ownership stake in foreign consortia over the course of the later 20th century. Petroecuador, successor of CEPE as Ecuador's state-run oil company, gained full ownership of Texaco's interests in 1992, and the US-based company left the country that same year. Several authors claim the discovery and subsequent exploitation of Ecuador's oil reserves fundamentally changed the economy of the country, shifting a once-agrarian society to an oil-dependent nation.

Over the course of Texaco's presence in Ecuador, 880 waste pools, 18 billion gallons of waste product, 17 million gallons of crude oil, and 49 million cubic feet per day of flared natural gas were intentionally or accidentally deposited in the Ecuadorian Amazon region.

== Development and ownership ==
In 1964, Texaco Petroleum Company (TexPet) began exploring for oil in northeast Ecuador, the homelands of the indigenous Cofán people. The following year, it started operating a consortium owned equally by itself and Gulf Oil to develop a tract in the area. Nueva Loja was founded as a base camp of Texaco. The consortium struck oil in 1967 and began full-scale production in 1972. The Ecuadorian government, through its national oil company CEPE, now Petroecuador, obtained a 25 percent interest in the consortium in 1974. Gulf subsequently sold its interest to CEPE. By 1976, the consortium was majority-owned by the Ecuadorian government. TexPet, however, was still the company responsible for drilling technical operations. TexPet transferred management of the consortium to Petroecuador in 1990. TexPet's concession expired in 1992, leaving Petroecuador as the sole owner. Petroecuador continues drilling in the area.

Over a period of 20 years, the Lago Agrio field produced 1.7 billion barrels (270×10^{6} m^{3}) of oil, with a profit of $25 billion. According to Chevron, 95 percent of the profit from the consortium went to the government. This figure has been harshly contested by the government itself.

Produced oil is transported by the 498-kilometre (309 mi) Sistema de Oleoducto Transecuatoriano (SOTE) and 506-kilometre (314 mi) Oleoducto de Crudos Pesados (OCP) pipelines to the marine terminal at Balao. Lago Agrio is also connected by the San Miguel–Lago Agrio pipeline. The multiproduct Poliducto pipeline runs from Lago Agrio to Quito.

== Pollution, remediation, impact ==
=== Pollution ===
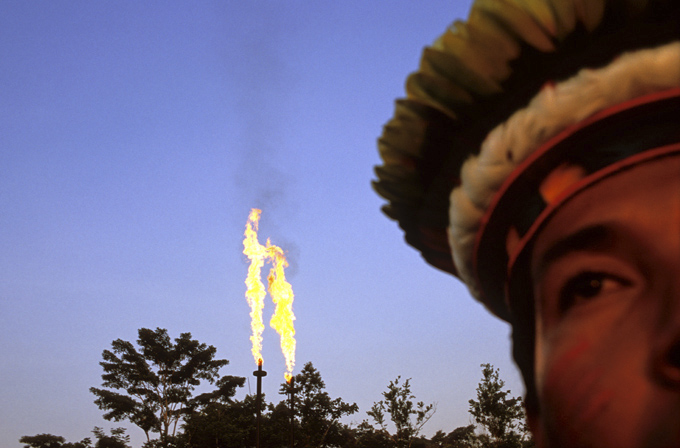
Gas flares in Lago Agrio

One of the most cited reports on environmental damage to Lago Agrio is Amazon Crude written by Judith Kimerling for the Natural Resources Defence Council. This report, which covers the Oriente region more broadly, includes a prediction that Ecuador's entire oil reserves would have been depleted by 2005 if the 1991 rate of 100 million barrels per year had continued. According to Kimerling's interviews with technical staff, approximately 19.3 billion gallons of produced water, with a petroleum content of 500–5,000 parts per million, were diverted into 880 unlined open pits where the water could reach streams and rivers relied on by local inhabitants for their drinking water, bathing and fishing. The produced water contained polycyclic aromatic hydrocarbons at levels many times higher than permitted in the US, where produced water was typically re-injected underground since at least the 1970s. An additional byproduct of the crude oil extraction was natural gas. Although Texaco had agreed to preserve the supply of natural gas, the Ministry of Energy and Mines estimated that 85%-88% of it was burned into the atmosphere. For each well that was dug, on average, an estimated 4,165 cubic metres of toxic drilling fluid accumulated in an open pit. The majority of the wells were dug in the first few years when Texaco and Gulf had the largest number of shares. Paul C. Lambert quoted a Petroecuador manager as saying "at some points, the rivers are like the sea" referring to the salinity of the water.

Crude oil itself also entered the environment when it was used to clean roads that Texaco had built. Such deliberate spills into jungles and pathways accounted for 650,000 barrels. Texaco's largest pipeline in Lago Agrio, the trans-Ecuadorian pipeline, ejected 16.8 million gallons of crude due to accidents. These include a March 1987 earthquake spilling several million gallons which was considered unnecessarily damaging due to the small number of valves on the pipeline. A May 1989 landslide spilled 210,000 gallons and led to reports of black water in the Napo River as far away as Peru. This occurred in the same month as a 294,000 gallon spill outside of Lago Agrio. Kimerling described a November 1989 leak in the Cuyabeno Wildlife Reserve as the first spill which was met with a Petroecuador-led cleanup even though five other spills had contaminated the same area since 1984. 1,415 oil spills in Ecuador were recorded during the 2000-2008 period when Texaco was no longer involved.

In 1992, Agra began an environmental audit whose findings required consensus from Texaco and Petroecuador representatives. A leaked draft showed that investigators observed contaminants, including chromium 6, cadmium and barium, in all soil samples that were tested and spills near 158 of the 163 visited well sites. In 1993, photojournalist Lou Dematteis travelled to sites that were still being used after Texaco's departure. He recalled that some of the open pits had been set on fire. In 1994, Agra's investigation concluded without releasing a report. Subsequent audits took place in 2003 and 2009 which found that 58 waste pits had been left uncovered. In the majority of covered pits, total petroleum hydrocarbon concentration was several times higher than Ecuador's legal limit which is itself 10 times as high as the limit in the US.

With the discovery of oil in Lago Agrio comes the deforestation of land in order to increase agriculture as Ecuadorian homesteaders move into the area. Between 1972 and 1992, about 350,000 Ecuadorian homesteaders moved to lands traditionally owned by the Cofán, Siona-Secoya, and Huaorani because of the discovery of oil. Scientists did a GIS analysis of the Ecuadorian region to see the districution of oil spills from 1995 to 2015. It was found that the highest frequency of spills occurred near the Sacha and Lago Agrio oil fields, which are located near the Aguarico and Napo river basins. These river basin are the water source of the easternmost parishes in Ecuador. Accidental oil spills from 2001 to 2011 released an estimated 10,000t of crude oil into the Ecuadorian Amazon. The American Petroleum Institute only required minimal standards of oil exploitation before Texaco-Chevron started its operation in Lago Agrio, Ecuador. Chevron ignored the guidelines from the American Petroleum Institute to ensure greater profits. The maturity of oil fields is coupled with a decline in oil quality and an increase in water content used in the total volume of oil extracted. These methods being used require water and chemical re-injection which are energy intensive.

=== Remediation ===
A full reinjection of produced water into the ground would have cost $5 billion according to environmental advocates. In 1980, Texaco rejected a $4 million proposal to build pits with a concrete barrier and transfer existing waste into them. In 1990, the Petroecuador-Texaco consortium committed to spending $8-$13 million on an environmental cleanup. In 1995, amid litigation, Texaco signed an agreement with the Ecuadorian government to clean 161 waste pits in proportion to its interest in the consortium, at a cost of $40 million. It hired engineering firm Woodward Clyde to oversee the cleaning which in turn contracted a predominantly Ecuadorian workforce. The release certifying that Texaco had met its obligations was issued by the government in 1998. Evidence has been found that the cleanup was incomplete, as the largest part of the area was not restored and the pits Texaco supposedly cleaned up were simply filled with ground on top to hide the toxic wastes. Plastic coverings have also been reported. Activists who criticized the pits for being easily permeable also stated that pipes connecting them to waterways were left in place.

Though having admitted to the dumping of the 19 billion gallons of run-off while drilling for oil in the rainforest, Chevron has maintained that it did so legally and according to industry standards, and has used the 1995 agreement as its primary defense against the ongoing legal claims. However, while the Ecuadorian government released Texaco from further liability, the agreement explicitly applied "without prejudice to the rights possibly held by third parties for the impact caused as a consequence of the operations of the former PETROECUADOR-TEXACO Consortium."

According to William Langewiesche, the 31 trees planted in the dirt that covered the first remediated pit had mostly died within ten years. The government began relocating affected citizens in 2008. Chevron's public relations staff have accused Pablo Fajardo of initially opposing these efforts so as to strengthen the lawsuit he was leading. Steps undertaken in the 2000s by Petroecuador to "at least meet those [standards] of the 1970s" include the practice of reinjecting produced water at all of its well sites and banning horizontal flares. Four wells intended for reinjection were built for Petroecuador by Texaco. Most cleanup projects by the Ecuadorian government, such as a $10 million cleaning in 2019, have taken place long after Texaco's withdrawal and have been done at a lower budget. There have also been community-led efforts to introduce microbes into contaminated soil for bioremediation.

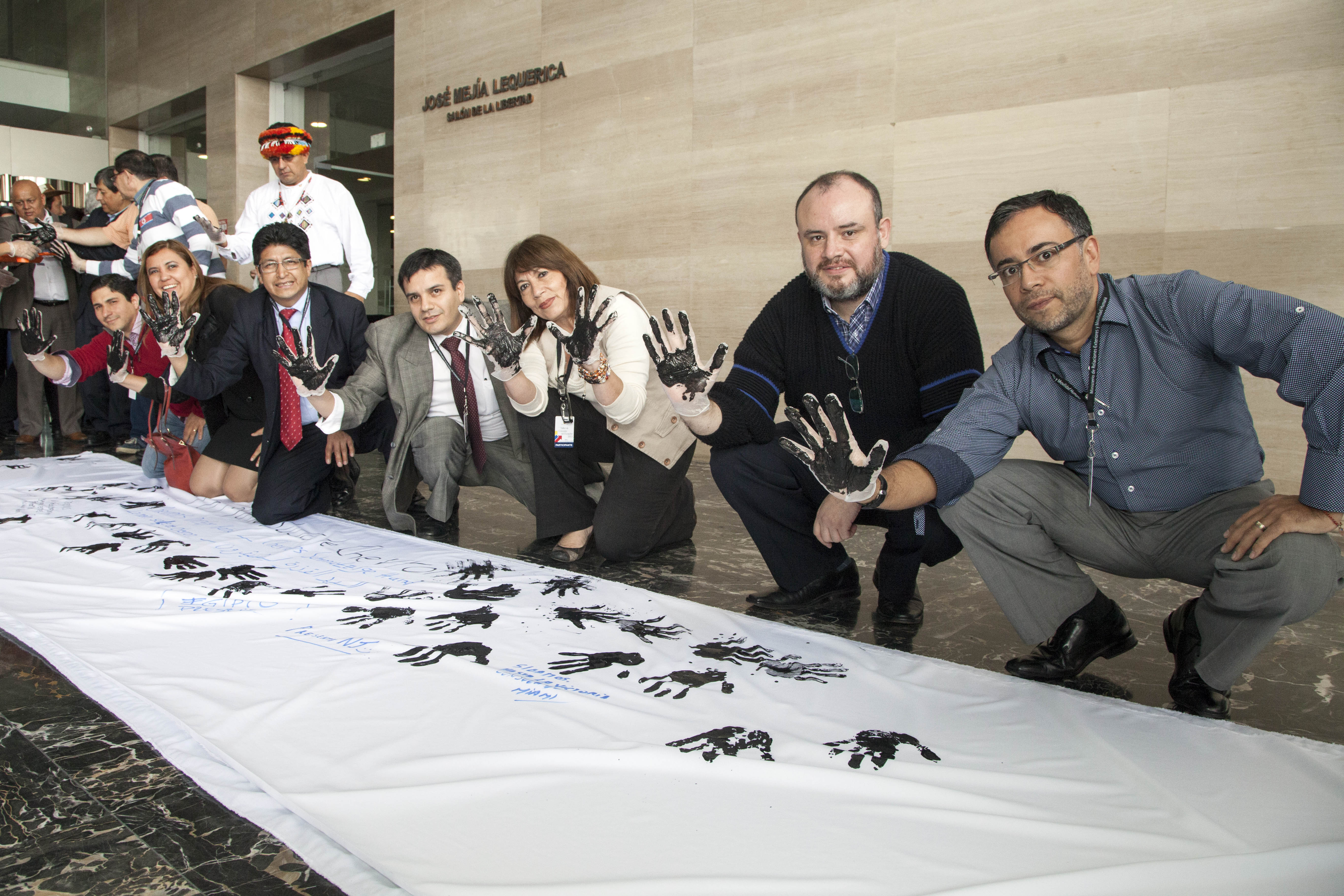
Lawyers in the case against Chevron operations in Ecuador

Texaco in Chevron avoided financial disclosure of the lawsuit in Ecuador until Chevron's 2008 SEC Form 10K was filed in early 2009. Chevron's firms financial statements have not recognized any financial responsibility to the communities in Ecuador who have been harmed by oil spills and contamination.

=== Impact ===
Lago Agrio is most often described as an "outpost" with buildings that "look thrown together". Its roads and airport are the result of industrialization efforts by Texaco. The oil boom correlated with a rise in crime including contract killings which are rarely investigated. These have claimed the lives of Pablo Fajardo's brother and one of his friends. Some of the earliest reports of damage to the community concern the practice of Texaco using its oil to clean the roads, causing rashes for some of the locals who walk on them barefoot. Accidents including crashes of oil tanker trucks and fatal collisions with pedestrians have all been attributed to the slippery roads. In 2003, it was estimated that 2.4 million acres of rainforest had been destroyed by oil operations across Ecuador.

An excess rate of cancer is one of the most commonly alleged health effects of the oil waste. Attempts to quantify this have varied widely with "130% higher" and "30 times higher" being among the quoted findings. Pablo Fajardo stated that by 2019, the pollution had caused 2,000 cancer deaths. Luis Yanza pointed out that Lago Agrio residents are uniquely vulnerable to cancer as the nearest treatment facility is a full day's drive away in Quito. Apart from maintaining its lack of responsibility for the bulk of the pollution, Chevron has maintained that there is no causal link between the produced water and cancer. Critics have pointed to an American study from 1987 which found increased cancer incidence from much lower volumes of produced water that were poured into streams. A 2017 study from Ecuador has been used to dispute this as well. Since the pits that were left uncovered were also left unfenced, local farmers have reported casualties among their livestock. Fishing tribes have described sick or dead fish in rivers close to the covered and uncovered pits. Chevron has instead blamed the water contamination on improperly routed sewers. As the vast majority of Ecuadorians in Lago Agrio do not have a centralized water supply, some of them have described rainwater as their cleanest alternative to the local rivers. In March 2020, James North wrote in The Nation that "[f]ive peer-reviewed scientific studies have shown an increased incidence of cancer and other health risks in the area. (Chevron funded its own peer-reviewed study, which claimed to find no such cancer risk)".

Others have described the oil consortium's impact from an anti-imperialist perspective. Some members of small Indigenous tribes developed alcoholism or turned to prostitution when their ability to live off the land was disrupted. The Association of Health Promoters of Sucumbios has reported increased rates of malnutrition in Lago Agrio. This has been linked to people changing their diet abruptly when they can no longer hunt for food. Some of the earliest contact between the Indigenous people and Texaco was mediated by the Summer Institute of Linguistics which was expelled from Ecuador in 1980 over alleged human rights abuses. Government officials have stated that the extinction of the Tetete people was partly caused by the encroachment of Texaco onto their land. A similar fate was declared for the Tagaeri in 2003.

Oil developments bring in resources such as roads and resource facilities, but are also linked to health problems and harm to the Indigenous populations in the Oriente. Infant mortality and malnutrition in petroleum-producing municipalities remain lower than in other Amazonian areas. The development of roads and highway networks caused by Chevron has paved the way for agricultural colonization to affect the Indigenous communities in Lago Agrio. The main effects of the crude oil spills that have occurred in Lago Agrio and throughout the Amazon is direct contact with wildlife affecting the skin, mucous tissues, major organs, limiting flight ability, killing wildlife and livestock, water contamination, and soil damage. Communities in the north-eastern Ecuadorian Amazon have noted and reported health concerns and environmental degradation due to Chevron-Texaco oil production in Lago Agrio, with a drop in value of rural land and biodiversity loss. The mix of biodiversity loss, illness, land contamination, colonization, and urbanization, Indigneous communities are facing loss of traditions and sovereignty.

== Litigation ==
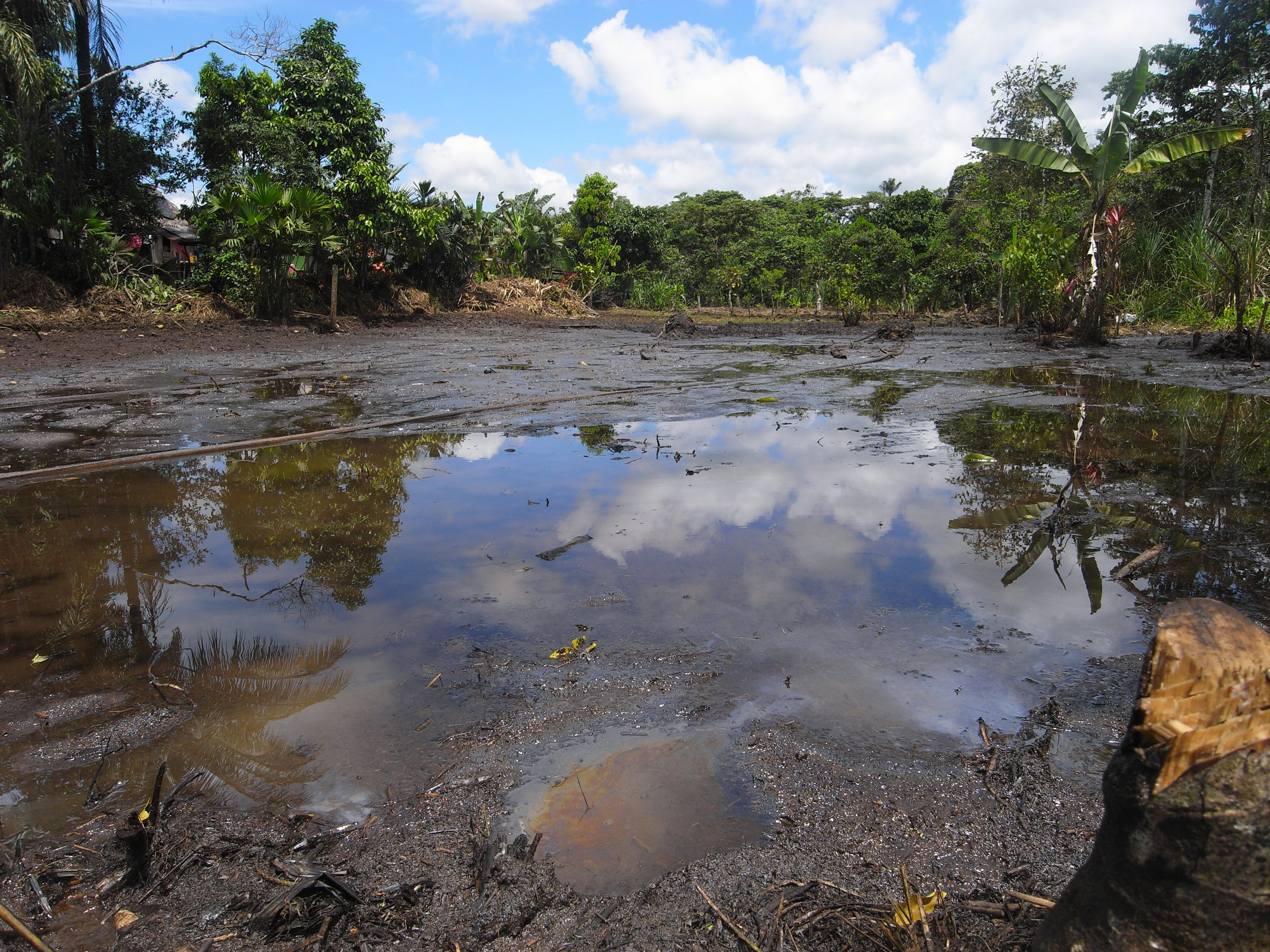
Oil pollution in Lago Agrio, November 2007

Lawyers for the Indigenous residents of the Lago Agrio field, led by Steven Donziger, sued Texaco in New York in 1993. The 30,000 member class-action lawsuit (Aguinda v. Texaco, Inc.) accused TexPet of discharging produced water into open pits, contaminating the water that was used by the locals for fishing, bathing, and drinking. The case was dismissed for improper venue in 2001.

Chevron claims that the company is being unfairly targeted as a deep pocket. It maintains that responsibility for damage and cleanup now lies with Petroecuador and the government, and contends that much of the present damage comes from Petroecuador's activities since 1990, including spills from a pipeline system built by the consortium that Petroecuador has not maintained.

=== Litigation in Ecuador ===
Blocked from suing Texaco in US courts, in 2003 the plaintiffs filed their case in Ecuador.

In 2008, a court-appointed expert issued a report accusing Texaco employees of not only widespread pollution, but deforestation and cultural destruction as well. The report estimated the damages by TexPet between $8 billion and $16 billion, which the expert later increased by $11 billion. A U.S. district court later ruled in support of Chevron's allegations that the report had been ghostwritten by Mr. Donziger and his associates and an environmental consulting firm hired by the plaintiffs in addition to participating in the bribing of the deciding judge.

Cristóbal Bonifaz, the lawyer who had filed the initial action in New York in 1993, was dismissed from the litigation in 2006. He went on to file a case against Chevron in 2007 on behalf of new clients who claimed that pollution had given them cancer. The court found that three of the plaintiffs did not have cancer. After dismissing their claims (leaving two claims active), the court imposed a $45,000 fine against Bonifaz for making frivolous claims.

Attorney Pablo Fajardo, who represents the plaintiffs, and activist Luis Yanza received the Goldman Environmental Prize in 2008 for their work in this case.

Plaintiffs in the Ecuadorian court case had initially demanded compensation payments of $27 billion. When the court ordered Chevron to pay $18 billion in February 2011 (later reduced to $9.5 billion), the company vowed to appeal, calling the ruling "illegitimate" and "unenforceable in any court that observes the rule of law", and said that "the United States and international tribunals had already taken steps to bar enforcement of the ruling." Plaintiffs were also planning to appeal, seeking damages of $113 billion.

=== Environmental consultants ===
In 2004, the plaintiffs hired biologist Dr. Charles Calmbacher to study and report on environmental conditions in the field. In 2005, the plaintiffs submitted to the court reports bearing Calmbacher's signature which said that there were high pollutant concentrations at two sites. Calmbacher, however, disavowed the reports, and said that his signature had been attached to reports which he did not write, and which misrepresented his findings. He actually found that the contaminant levels at the two sites were too low to pose a risk to human health or the environment.

Chevron named Stratus in its 2011 RICO lawsuit against various parties that worked on the Ecuadorian plaintiffs' case against Chevron. Chevron also contacted Stratus' clients in an attempt to pressure the clients to drop Stratus, and vigorously attacked Stratus in the public media. In April 2013, after revelations during the RICO case about the conduct of the Ecuadorian plaintiffs' attorneys and under intense financial pressure, the company disavowed its involvement in the case, citing the taint introduced by those revelations. Chevron's lawsuit against Stratus was then dismissed with prejudice, meaning that Chevron cannot re-file the claim.

=== Attempts to collect the judgment ===
Since Chevron Corporation has no substantive assets in Ecuador, plaintiffs filed actions to enforce the judgment against Chevron Corporation subsidiaries in Brazil, Argentina and Canada.

In 2009, Chevron had filed a complaint against Ecuador at the international Permanent Court of Arbitration under the 1997 bilateral investment treaty between the United States and Ecuador, charging that Ecuador had failed to ensure a fair trial and had reneged on a 1998 contract absolving Texaco of any compensation claims. The three-person tribunal, acting under The Hague's Permanent Court of Arbitration, ruled in 2011 that Ecuador should halt all enforcement efforts of the Ecuadorian judgment against Chevron, both within and without Ecuador.

In February 2013, the tribunal said the Ecuador government should have stopped plaintiffs in the case from going to courts in Brazil, Argentina and Canada to try to collect the judgment handed down by an Ecuadorean court in 2011. A spokesperson for the plaintiffs said the "courts hearing enforcement actions would likely pay little attention to the tribunal since it was not binding on the rain-forest communities".

Argentina: In June 2013, Argentina's Supreme Court revoked an embargo on the assets and future income of Chevron's Argentina subsidiary.

Netherlands: In September 2013, The Hague arbitration panel ruled in favor of Chevron, finding that an agreement signed in 1995 by the government of Ecuador released Texaco Corporation from financial responsibility from any claims of "collective damage." However, the panel left open the possibility that Chevron could still be liable for damages incurred by individuals.

Brazil: In November 2017, the Superior Court of Justice of Brazil rejected enforcement of the 2013 Ecuadorian Supreme Court award, with the prosecutor concluding that the verdict was "issued in an irregular manner, especially under deplorable acts of corruption."

Canada: In May 2013, Justice David Brown of the Ontario Superior Court stayed the action, but ruled that the Canadian courts have no jurisdiction to enforce the award ruled by an Ecuadorian court. However, the Court of Appeal for Ontario ruled that Justice Brown's stay was premature and held that the "issues deserve to be addressed and determined." After a long procedural history, the appeals court ultimately declined to recognize and enforce the foreign judgment. On May 23, 2018, it determined that Chevron Canada's assets were not exigible by Chevron's judgment creditors, because of the principle of corporate separateness. The plaintiffs sought leave to appeal the decision to the Supreme Court of Canada. Leave to appeal was denied on April 4, 2019, thus ending the enforcement proceedings in Canada.

United States: Chevron obtained an injunction by a U.S. federal judge, preventing the plaintiffs from collecting on the Ecuadorean judgment anywhere in the world. This injunction was overturned by the Second Circuit Court of Appeals in September 2011.

=== U.S. civil judgment against Donziger and Ecuadorian plaintiffs ===
Chevron acquired outtakes of the 2009 documentary Crude, which covered part of the case. The outtakes suggest that Donziger considered the Ecuadorian system of justice to be corrupt, and had urged Ecuadorian President Rafael Correa to issue criminal indictments against two Chevron lawyers involved in the settlement negotiations of the late 1990s; the two lawyers were subsequently indicted. When Donziger was ordered to testify about this in the U.S. federal case, he claimed attorney–client privilege but was rebuked by the judge. Donziger subsequently was forced to hand over all his case files, his computers, his tax returns and bank account information to Chevron, and he was deposed under oath. Donziger's diary, which had been stored on one of his computers, became a matter of public record. The deposition revealed that the 2009 environmental report signed by a court-appointed expert had largely been written by an environmental consultancy company hired by the plaintiffs.

In 2009, Chevron released videos that it said showed evidence that the Ecuadorian judicial proceedings were corrupted by bribery and political influence. Chevron stated that it had been given secretly recorded videos of three meetings, in one of which the presiding judge appears to state that he will rule against Chevron and that the company's appeals would be denied in spite of the fact that the trial was still in progress. In a second video, Patricio Garcia, who claims to be a political coordinator for the presidency and an official of the ruling political party, suggests that government lawyers would help write the judge's final ruling. Garcia also demands a bribe of $3 million from contractors seeking cleanup contracts, and states that the money will be divided between the judge, the presidency, and the plaintiffs. The judge was forced to resign. Chevron claims it had no involvement in the videotaping; however, in April 2010 it was found that one of the men involved in the filming was a long-time Chevron contractor, who in turn was later caught on hidden camera saying he "has enough evidence to ensure a victory by the Amazon communities if Chevron failed to pay him what he was promised." This man was later relocated to the United States with his family at Chevron's expense, where he is also receiving an undisclosed amount of living expenses. The other man involved in filming the video is a convicted drug smuggler.

In February 2011, Chevron filed suit in New York against Donziger and several other people involved in the plaintiff's case, invoking the Racketeer Influenced and Corrupt Organizations Act (RICO Act) and alleging extortion and fraud in that they made up evidence and tried to manipulate the legal system of Ecuador.

In 2010, the plaintiffs engaged the Washington D.C. law firm of Patton Boggs to oversee the legal strategy of suing Chevron in various countries around the world, to collect the Ecuadorean judgment. Patton Boggs is one of the top three lobbying firms in the US in terms of revenue, and was seen as having the international legal experience needed to enforce the award against Chevron; in return, Patton Boggs was to have received 5% of moneys collected. Chevron sued Patton Boggs, alleging that by participating in the case, the law firm knowingly abetted fraud on the part of the plaintiff's lead attorney, Steven Donziger. In May 2014 Patton Boggs agreed to withdraw from the Lago Agrio case, pay Chevron $15 million in damages, assign to Chevron its percentage of claims collected, and assist Chevron in discovery in Chevron's lawsuits against Donziger and others. In return, Chevron dropped all claims against Patton Boggs. Patton Boggs released a statement that, in view of a US court finding of fraud on the part of Donziger, it regretted its involvement in the case.

In March 2014, a United States district court judge ruled that the Ecuadorian plaintiff's lead US attorney, Steven Donziger, had used "corrupt means," including payment of almost US$300,000 in bribes, to obtain the 2011 court verdict in Ecuador. The judge did not rule on the underlying issue of environmental damages. While the US ruling does not affect the decision of the court in Ecuador, it has blocked efforts to collect damages from Chevron in US courts. Donziger and the two Ecuadorian defendants appealed, and on August 8, 2016, the United States Court of Appeals for the Second Circuit affirmed the district court's judgment against them in all respects.

In September 2018, the District of Columbia Court of Appeal suspended plaintiff's attorney Steven Donziger from practicing law in DC, joining the New York State Supreme Court in doing so. Having no law license elsewhere, Donziger can no longer practice law in the United States.

=== Public perceptions, paid advocacy ===
Chevron hired former US trade representative Mickey Kantor and former Bill Clinton chief of staff Mack McLarty to lobby the Obama administration to pressure Ecuador to make a deal via a proposed threat to end trade preferences for Ecuador.

The plaintiffs, seeking to put public pressure on Chevron to settle, have successfully enlisted public support from environmental groups, and since 2013 the Ecuador government has spent over $500,000 to recruit celebrity advocates for their position.

In 2013, forty-three environmental and human rights organizations including The Sierra Club and Greenpeace USA signed an open letter condemning Chevron's legal actions as a threat to free speech and an open society. In May 2014 simultaneous protests were held in at least sixteen countries against Chevron. Also in 2014, thirteen organizations including Amnesty International filed an amicus brief in opposition to Chevron's RICO attack, again on the grounds of its threat to free speech.

Actors, musicians, and other celebrities have long campaigned against Chevron, blaming it for pollution in the rainforest in Ecuador. Celebrities such as Mia Farrow, Danny Glover, Sting, and Cher have visited Ecuador to bring attention to advocate the Ecuador government's position. Payments of $188,391 and $330,000 were made to agencies representing Mia Farrow and Danny Glover, respectively.

The plaintiffs hired human rights activist Kerry Kennedy to conduct public relations for their cause. Kennedy traveled to Ecuador in 2009, after which she blasted Chevron in an article for the Huffington Post, invoking the term "genocide." Kennedy was paid for the effort by the plaintiffs, a fact made public in 2012. Shortly after her Huffington Post pieces, the plaintiffs' lead American lawyer reportedly paid Kennedy $50,000 in February 2010, and the law firm budgeted $10,000 per month for her services, plus $40,000 in expenses in June 2010. Kennedy was also reportedly given a 0.25 percent share of any money collected from Chevron, worth US$40 million if the full amount were to be collected. Kennedy responded that she was "paid a modest fee for the time I spent on the case," but denied that she had any financial interest in the outcome.

A protest against Chevron's refusal to pay the Ecuador judgment, held outside the Chevron annual meeting in Midland, Texas in May 2014, turned controversial when reporters determined that some of the several dozen protesters had been hired to participate, at $85 per person. The plaintiffs and their American public relations firm, MCSquared, both denied responsibility for hiring protesters, and the Los Angeles-based film company that recruited the paid protesters declined to identify who ordered and paid for their presence. In turn, Chevron has hired several public relations firms and what Pablo Fajardo estimates as 60 law firms to advocate on its behalf and launch countersuits against the plaintiffs' legal team. Pulitzer Prize winner Mark Fiore collaborated with Amazon Watch to release a series of animated videos portraying the extent of Chevron's retaliatory actions and the use of the RICO statute to "suppress free speech."

Ecuador is supported in the dispute with Chevron by a Venezuelan group, The Ecuador Solidarity Committee, and the ex-Minister of Environment of France, Corinne Lepage, and Delphine Batho, a Socialist deputy in France.

=== Plaintiff financing ===
Neither the plaintiffs nor their legal counsel have the resources to fight a drawn-out legal battle of attrition with Chevron. To finance the litigation, New York lawyer Steven R. Donziger, who acts as a spokesman and lobbyist for the plaintiffs, sold a percentage of the final settlement to a hedge fund.

Early on, the plaintiffs obtained funding from the Philadelphia legal firm of Kohn, Swift & Graf, PC. After investing $6 million in the case, Kohn, Swift & Graf withdrew from the case in November 2009, citing differences with lead attorney Donziger.

The plaintiffs next turned to Burford Capital, which agreed to finance the litigation in exchange for a share of any award to the plaintiffs. Burford invested US$4 million in 2009 and intended to supply another $11 million over time in exchange for 5.5% of damages. It announced in April 2013 that the plaintiffs' lawyers had misled Burford, and it was quitting the case. This financing was directed to Patton Boggs.

=== International arbitration ===
On September 7, 2018, the Permanent Court of Arbitration in The Hague unanimously issued an award in favor of Chevron and Texaco Petroleum Company. The decision concluded that the judgment in Ecuador was fraudulent, corrupt and "should not be recognized or enforced by the courts of other States." The amount Ecuador must pay to Chevron to compensate for damages is yet to be determined. The award found that Ecuador violated its obligations under international treaties, investment agreements and international law. The Court of Arbitration's findings of fraudulent activities included:

- That the evidence placed before the Court is "the most thorough documentary, video, and testimonial proof of fraud ever put before an arbitral tribunal."
- That the plaintiffs blackmailed an Ecuadorian judge, triggering him to order the appointment of an "expert" friendly to the plaintiffs.
- That Ecuadorian government prosecutors "actively cooperated" with the plaintiffs.
- That the plaintiffs bribed the "experts" and ghostwrote their report.
- That the plaintiffs paid a retired judge to draft the acting judge's orders—and that the same judge solicited bribes that Chevron refused to pay, but not so the plaintiffs.

== See also ==
- Patton Boggs scandal
- Energy policy of Ecuador
- Orinoco Mining Arc
