= Petroecuador =

National petroleum company of Ecuador

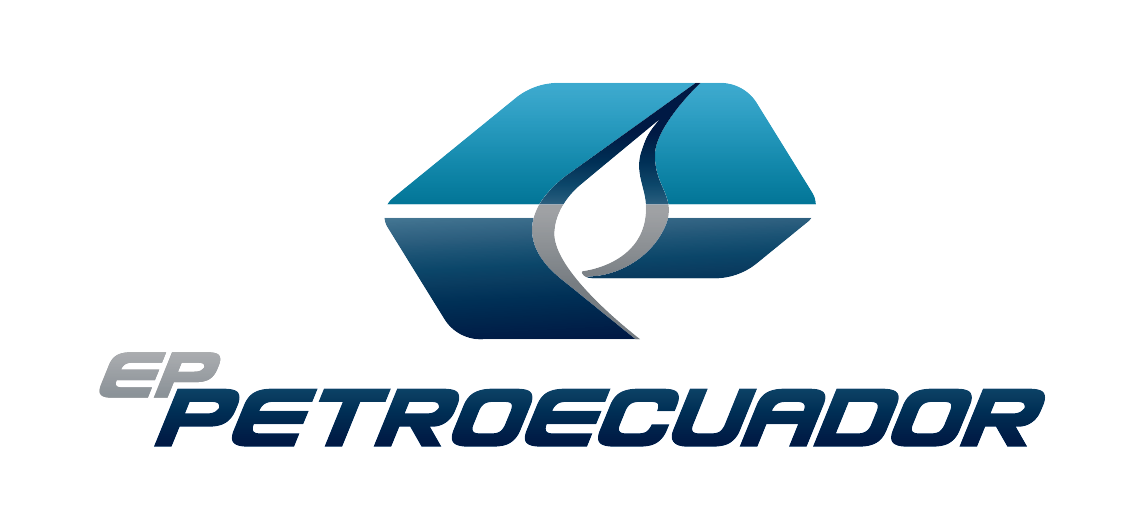
- Logo since 2010

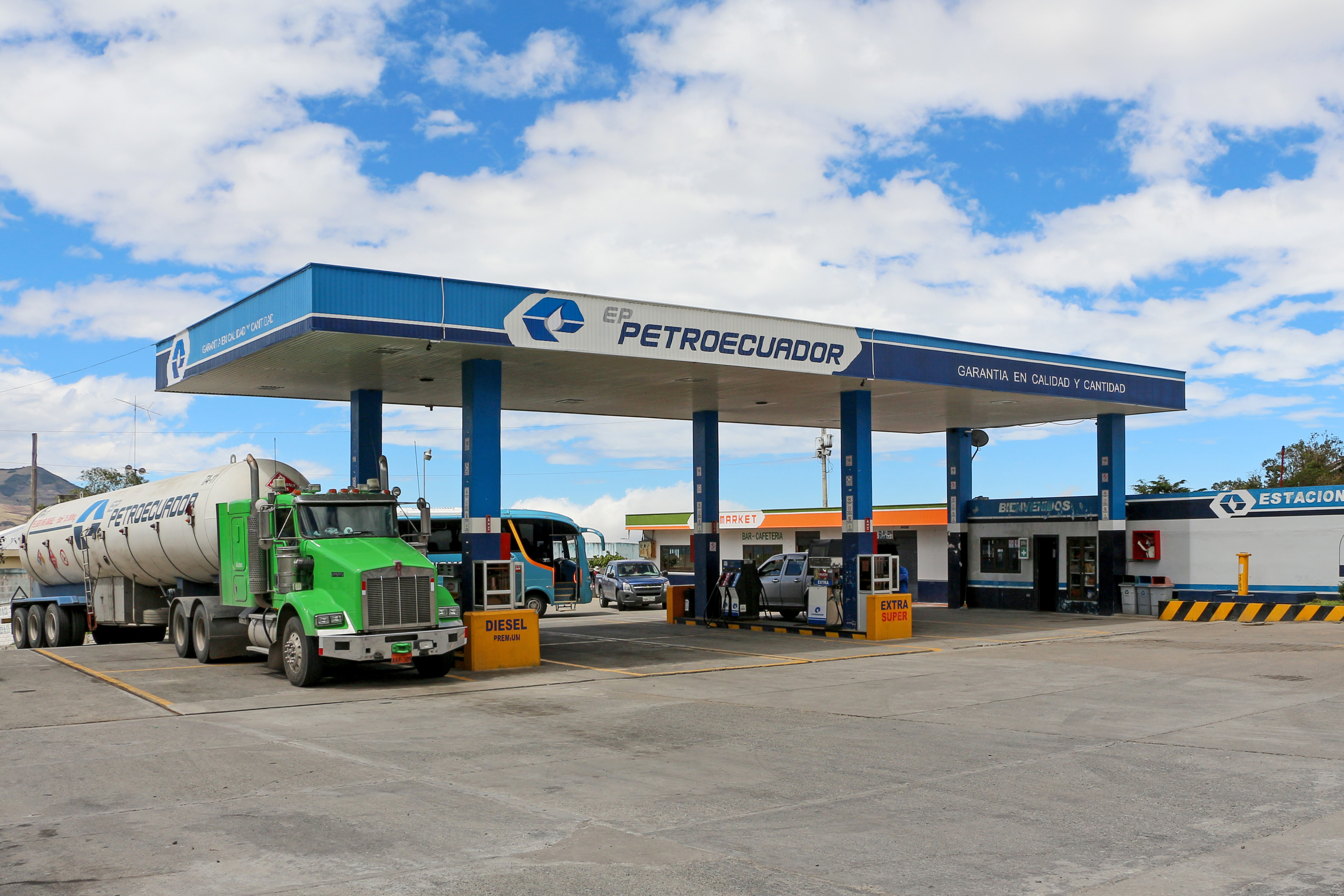
- Petroecuador petrol station on the Pan-American Highway
- Native name: Empresa Pública de Hidrocarburos del Ecuador
- Type: Government-owned (Empresa Pública)
- Industry: Oil and gas
- Predecessor: Corporación Estatal Petrolera Ecuatoriana
- Founded: Quito, Ecuador (September 26, 1989)
- Headquarters: Quito, Ecuador
- Products: petroleum refined oil products
- Subsidiaries: Petroproduccion; Petroindustrial; Petrocomercial
- Website: www.eppetroecuador.ec

EP Petroecuador (Empresa Estatal Petróleos del Ecuador; Empresa Pública Petroecuador; meaning: State Petroleum Company of Ecuador) is the national oil company of Ecuador. Ecuador is a member of the Organization of the Petroleum Exporting Countries (OPEC) and, although it is the smallest member, the country produced 531,000 barrels of crude oil per day in 2019. The oil corporation is a significant part of the Ecuadorian economy. The petroleum industry has expanded to the production of refined commodities such as gasoline, liquefied petroleum, and jet fuel. The government of Ecuador is highly dependent on the revenues from the energy sector to support its budget and finance state projects.

== History ==
Petroecuador is a state-owned enterprise, founded on September 26, 1989. In its conception, Petroecuador began as a fiscal agent; however, in time, it came to manage and operate most of the country's oil sector. It is the successor to Corporación Estatal Petrolera Ecuatoriana (CEPE) which was formed in 1972. In 1973, Ecuador granted Shell Oil drilling concessions. In 1964, Texaco was also invited. From 1977, Texaco became the majority owner (62.5%) until it transferred ownership back to the Ecuadorean state in 1992, maintaining a 37.5% ownership. The transfer of ownership was due to political policies within Ecuador limiting foreign ownership as well as the decision not to renew the contracts.

== Operations ==
Petroecuador is engaged in the exploration, production, storage, refining of crude oil, and retailing petroleum products. It operates through subsidiaries, such as Petroproduccion (exploration and production), Petroindustrial (refining), and Petrocomercial (transportation and marketing of refined products). The company operates several oil fields, including Shushufindi, Sacha, Auca, Lago Agrio, and Libertador. It also operates the Trans-Ecuadorian oil pipeline network, Sistema de Oleoducto Transecuatoriano (SOTE), built in 1972 for Texaco-Gulf. Ecuador is the sixth largest oil producer in the Latin American region.

Petroecuador owns three petroleum refineries in Ecuador:

- Esmeraldas Refinery, 110,000 barrels per day (17,000 m^{3}/d) (began 1978)
- La Libertad Refinery, 45,000 barrels per day (7,200 m^{3}/d)
- Shushufindi Refinery, 20,000 barrels per day (3,200 m^{3}/d)

The Sector organization in 2012 was organized into the National Oil Companies (NOC's), Petroecuador, Petroamazonas and the Operaciones Rio Napo (which is jointly owned between Ecuador and Venezuela).

The company's marketing network includes 148 Petrocomercial service stations.

The largest production of oil in Ecuador is concentrated in the Northeastern part of the province. The Ishpingo-Tambococha-Tiputini (ITT) in the Yasuni National Park is said to hold 909 million barrels of oil reserves, yet controversial social relations causes protests and political conflicts. The indigenous social relations regarding the oil production of Ecuador are facing controversial issues. The indigenous communities have suffered various consequences for the growing energy sector in Ecuador as it seeks to expand. The state policies have caused domestic conflicts among local communities where the indigenous territories and practices are overlooked in expense to the state economic benefits. In 2003 and in 2010, the protests escalated due to political campaigns urging privatization (2003), and expansionist policies enabling foreign corporations access to the market (2010).

As of August 2016, the company owns and operates an Embraer ERJ 145LR aircraft, which was delivered directly from Embraer in October 2008.

In 2025, after the rupture in the pipeline in March, Petroecuador declared a force majeure since production was reduced by more than 130,000 barrels per day due to the disruption in the SOTE and OCP pipelines and well closures in July 2025, caused by erosion along the Coca River.

== Safety record ==
Petroecuador has allegedly contributed to human rights violations according to some critics. The violations are on the health basis concerning the local populations due to bad practice of Petroecuador as well as foreign industries established within Ecuador.

On February 26, 1998, there was an explosion and fire at the Petroecuador pipeline in Esmeraldas, a port city in northwest Ecuador.

In another incident unrelated to oil exploitation, on January 17, 2002, a Fairchild FH-227E passenger plane (reg. HC-AYM, sn. 511), belonging to the aviation unit of Petroproducción, flying from Quito's Mariscal Sucre Airport to Lago Agrio Airport (150 km. west of Quito), went off course and struck the 4500 meter-high Cerro El Tigre mountain in Colombia's Putumayo Department. This happened 14 km across from the border with Ecuador and approximately 50 miles (80 km) from its destination. The 21 passengers (all Petroecuador employees) plus the five crew members were killed. The controlled flight into terrain was caused by a loss of situational awareness by the pilots, owing to distractions (lack of sterile cockpit rule) and poor crew resource management. All these factors were compounded by bad weather (fog) and the plane's lack of a ground proximity warning system.

== Environmental record ==
Petroecuador has been the subject of controversy over the impact of exploration and pipeline operations on the environment and Huaorani and Cofan indigenous peoples within the Amazon basin in Ecuador's Oriente region. In 1964, oil drilling operations began to take place in previously roadless rainforest carried out by Texaco.

Advocacy groups such as Amazon Watch and ChevronToxico have attempted to document the oil spills, ecological damage and human impacts of these operations. Prof. Judith Kimerling of CUNY School of Law in 1991 published a book Amazon Crude (ISBN 0960935851) which details many of these problems.

Petroecuador has been the sole owner and operator of the oil facilities since 1990. Petroecuador's operations have been associated with documented hydrocarbon contamination in waterways, soils, and air. From 2000 to 2008, the company was responsible for 1,415 oil spills. Petroecuador has also failed to clean up sites that were its responsibility under the joint venture.

On 13 March 2025, there was a rupture in the SOTE pipeline which caused more than 25,000 barrels of oil to spill out over an area extending over 86 km and affecting 11 parishes in the Esmeraldas province. On 26 March 2025, a state of emergency was declared due to the natural disaster and its effects.

=== Lago Agrio oil field operations ===
Between the years 1964 and 1992, the Texaco Corporation and years later Petroecuador carried on intensive oil operations in the northeastern region of the Ecuadorian Amazon. These operations affected indigenous and non-indigenous local livelihoods in the area by impairing the ecological functions and biodiversity of thousands of acres of land. Today the effects of these operations have been investigated and through the dumping crude in open pits, burying oil extraction byproducts, and burning unwanted oil without proper treatment, cancer rates amongst indigenous and non-indigenous residence has increased dramatically with in a ten-year time period. As oil weathers, contamination occurs as aromatic compounds are released and invade surrounding aquifers.

== See also ==
- Sarayaku
