= Oriente (Ecuador) =

Amazonian region of Ecuador

Coordinates: 0.8°S 76.9°W

The Oriente (Spanish: Región amazónica) is a region of eastern Ecuador, comprising the eastern slopes of the Ecuadorian Andes and the lowland areas of rainforest in the Amazon basin.

== Location ==
It is bordered on the north by San Miguel and Putumayo rivers and on the east and south by Peru. Oriente has an area of about 50,000 square miles (130,000 square km) and consists of little-explored and virtually unexploited tropical forest inhabited by a tiny fraction of the country's population, living mostly in small villages along the river courses.

The Oriente comprises everything east of the Ecuadorian Andes, which by most definitions approaches half the country, but only 5 percent of the country’s people live there. Although the Pacific defines the coast and the mountains comprise the Sierra, the Oriente finds its heart in the rivers that tie it to the Amazon basin and, eventually, the Atlantic Ocean. The inexorable waters can undercut a huge clay bank or snip a bend overnight, stranding an oxbow kilometers long. The muddy Río Napo, more than one kilometer wide in spots, drains the Ríos Coca and Aguarico and heads off into Peru. Colombia’s Amazon lies across the Río Putumayo to the north. Farther south, the Río Pastaza and Rio Paute flow from Sangay National Park.

== Conditions ==
A sizable fraction of the population are indigenous peoples. Illiteracy is widespread, although the Roman Catholic Salesian missions have established a few boarding schools.

== Economy ==
Timber and petroleum are the major exploited economic resources.

== History ==
The Quijos region east of Coca was well known to the Incas, who ventured downhill to meet lowland tribes in peace and battle. It was also the first area east of the Andes to be penetrated by the Spanish. The anniversary of the European discovery of the Amazon River (February 12) is still celebrated in jungle cities with markets and fairs. Within a few centuries after European contact most of the region’s tens of thousands of inhabitants had fallen victim to smallpox and cholera.

The discovery of oil in the 1960s brought this once-stagnant backwater into the national consciousness. In the north, an oil pipeline helps transport the vast reserves that make Ecuador the third-largest oil exporter in Latin America.

Throughout the region, Quechua words on maps show the influence of the Lowland Quechua, who inhabit the foothills and forests in western Napo and northern Pastaza provinces. Also in the north are pockets of Siona/Secoya and Cofán. The Huaorani have a huge reserve in central Napo province and spill over into Yasuní National Park. To the south, the Shuar and Achuar saw their ancestral lands divided by the decades-old border dispute with Peru, which ended in 1998.

== Locations of interest ==
- Papallacta Hot Springs: hot springs on the road from Quito—Piñan Lakes are nearby.
- Napo Wildlife Center: One of the newest lodges in the Ecuadorian Amazon; run by an indigenous community down the Río Napo.
- Tena: A white-water and jungle-tour hotspot, Tena is easier to reach than most other cities in the Oriente.
- Zamora: One and a half hour by bus from Loja, this town is located in the southeastern part of the Oriente and is one of the entrances to the Podocarpus National Park.
