= Ecuadorian Siona =

Tucanoan language of Ecuador and Columbia

- Baicoca
- Native to: Ecuador, Columbia
- Region: Sucumbíos
- Ethnicity: Siona people (Bai)
- Native speakers: 460 (2008–2012)
- Language family: Tucanoan: Western; Napo; Siona–Secoya; Siona; Ecuadorian Siona

Language codes
- ISO 639-3: (covered by snn Siona)
- Glottolog: ecua1247
- ELP: Baicoca-Siecoca (shared)

Ecuadorian Siona (also known as Baicoca) is a Tucanoan language spoken by the Siona people of Ecuador, and can be considered a dialect or variety of a larger Baicoca-Siecoca, or Siona-Secoya, language cluster. Ecuadorian Siona is part of the Western Tukanoan language family.

== Classification ==
Ecuadorian Siona is closely related to Secoya and Colombian Siona (see Siona language); the three represent a language cluster spoken near the borders of Colombia, Ecuador and Peru. The variety spoken in Ecuador differs from the one spoken in Colombia with regard to some lexical, morphological, and phonological characteristics. Some properties of Ecuadorian Siona are actually closer to Secoya. The three varieties show a high level of mutual intelligibility. Bruil views them as three different varieties of the same Siona-Secoya dialect continuum, with Ecuadorian Siona in the middle.

== Geographic distribution ==
The Ecuadorian variety is spoken in the Eastern jungle area of Ecuador in the Sucumbíos province. Speakers of Ecuadorian Siona mostly reside in six villages: Puerto Bolívar and Tarabëaya are located on the Cuyabeno river, and Sototsiaya, Orahuëaya, Aboquëhuira and Bi'aña on the Aguarico River. Ecuadorian Siona is also spoken outside of Ecuador, however, it is minimal. As of 2020, there were 25 native speakers in Buenavista, Nuevo Amanecer, and Mocoa in Colombia.

== History ==
Today, Ecuadorian Siona is spoken by less than 250 people and is considered an endangered language. Not only has the influence and spread of the dominant Spanish culture and language brought detrimental consequences for the Indigenous ways of living and language but also the fact that families are no longer passing down the language to the younger generation. There are differences amongst the different villages and the presence of Ecuadorian Siona. Children in the Puerto Bolívar village are taught Spanish at home and very few are taught the Siona language. The children of the Sotosiaya village grow up with Siona as their first language until they go to school where they are instructed in Spanish. However, the village that is in more danger of losing this language is the Tarabëaya village. In this village, the only speakers of Siona are those who are over the age of 50.

External factors, such as missionary activity, international tourism, and the presence of the oil industry, have contributed to the decline of native Siona speakers. Some internal factors also play a role, such as changes in the intermarriage patterns and migration. The traditions behind intermarriage used to involve unions between the Siona, the Secoya, and Cofán Indigenous groups, making the three more culturally united. Siona and Secoya can be after all considered varieties of the same language. However, their intermarriage practices have extended to other groups probably because the three groups are very small. Today, the Ecuadorian Siona marry other Indigenous groups, such as the Amazonian Kichwa and the Shuar, whose languages are unrelated to Siona. They also marry mestizos, non-Indigenous people of Ecuador. As a result, many Ecuadorian Siona children grow up speaking one language – Spanish.

== Phonology ==
The phonemic inventory in Ecuadorian Siona is large relative to other Tukanoan languages, consisting of 17 consonantal phonemes and 12 vocalic phonemes. For the proto-Tukanoan language, only 9 consonants and 12 vowels have been proposed.

(C)V(V)(H) represents the basic syllable structure in Ecuadorian Siona, where H stands for the glottal stop [ʔ] or the glottal fricative [h]. Long vowels and diphthongs are generally restricted to open syllables, while closed syllables contain short vowels. Only the glottal consonants appear in the coda position, and words generally do not end with closed syllables, except for borrowings, such as the Spanish loanword [mõh.tor] ‘motor’.

=== Consonants ===
Siona's phonemic inventory consists of 18 consonants with two phonemic nasal consonants /m, n/. In addition, these nasal consonants [h͂ , w͂ , ɲ] also appear in Siona. In the Siona language, there are two oral stops: a plain series of /p, t, k, kw/ and a series of laryngealized stops that are seen as /p̰ , t̰ , k̰ , k̰ w/.

| | | Labial | Coronal | Palatal | Dorsal | | Glottal |
| | | Labial | Coronal | Palatal | Plain | Labial | Glottal |
|---|---|---|---|---|---|---|---|
| Stop | Plain | p | t | | k | k^{w} | |
| Stop | Laryngealized | p̰ | t̰ | | k̰ | k̰^{w} | ʔ |
| Affricate | | | tʃ | | | | |
| Fricative | Plain | | s | | | h | |
| Fricative | Laryngealized | | s̰ | | | | h |
| Nasal | | m | n | | | | |
| Approximant | | (w) | | (j) | | | |

=== Vowels ===
| | Front | Central | Back |
|---|---|---|---|
| High | i ĩ | ɨ ɨ̃ | u ũ |
| Mid | e ẽ | | o õ |
| Low | | a ã | |

=== Pre-aspiration ===
It has been suggested that the glottal fricative [h] in the coda position might be better analysed as a case of preaspiration in Ecuadorian Siona. On one hand, its occurrence shows some phonological and phonotactic restrictions, specifically before [–voice] consonants. On the other hand, its occurrence is unpredictable before the palatal nasal. A similar process occurs in other Tukanoan languages. For instance, the occurrence of glottal fricative before voiceless consonants has been observed for Colombian Siona and Ecuadorian Secoya. Among Eastern Tukanoan languages of the Vaupés region (Kotiria (aka Wanano), Wa’ikhana (aka Piratapuyo), Tukano, Siriano, Desano, Tuyuka, and Yuruti), glottal frication before [–voice] is ascribed to preaspiration

A more recent study explored the status of preaspiration in Ecuadorian Siona by applying a distributional method of analysis. General criteria for preaspiration involves “a tight distributional relationship between the aspiration and a set of consonants”, such that [h] only appears before a restricted set of consonants (mostly, voiceless non-continuants but sometimes, voiceless obstruents) (p. 9). In root-internal position and before [–voice], complementary distribution was found between coda [h] and no coda (or coda ∅), and between coda [h] and the second part of the long vowel or diphthong (or long V). Such results strongly suggest preaspiration in this environment, i.e. root-internally and before [–voice]. However, coda [h] was also found in contrastive distribution with coda [ʔ] in the same environment, illustrated by minimal pairs such as [wah.ti] ‘bad spirit’ and [waʔ.ti] ‘machete’. This means that coda [h] cannot be predicted based on the phonological environment where it appears since coda [ʔ] appears in the same environment. Thus, it was concluded that the status of the glottal stop needs to be reevaluated together with the glottal fricative when they appear root-internally. Where coda [h] appears at the morpheme boundary, the results were different: it was found in contrastive distribution with coda ∅, coda [ʔ] and long V before [k, (s), ɲ] (note that [h-s] sequence was not a part of analysed data but such examples appear in Bruil). Thus, at the morpheme boundary, the results are in favour of the phonemic realisation of coda [h]. In addition, the occurrence of [h] before [ɲ] root-internally is extremely rare and is not phonologically predictable, indicating phonemic realization in this environment. In conclusion, while preaspiration within roots is possible, more data need to be analysed; whereas at the morpheme boundary and before [ɲ], preaspiration is highly unlikely.

== Morphology ==
=== Nominal morphology ===
==== Nominal classifiers ====
In Ecuadorian Siona, the classifiers can be used alongside nouns, numerals, demonstratives, adjectives, and verbs. When using classifiers on numerals, demonstratives, adjectives, and verbs, they are allowing the modifier to agree with the head of the noun phrase. This language utilizes both general and specific classifiers.
