= Guerreras por la Amazonía =

Ecuadorian environmental group

- Formation: 2020
- Region served: Ecuadorian Amazon
- Key people: Leonela Moncayo
- Volunteers: 15

Guerreras por la Amazonía (GxA; lit. 'Women Warriors of the Amazon') is an Ecuadorian human rights group. Made up of girls and teenagers living in the Ecuadorian Amazon, it campaigns against the use of gas flares near populated areas of Ecuador, as well as for the making of reparations for affected communities.

== Context ==
As of 2023, there were 486 gas flares located in Oriente, a region of eastern Ecuador including lowland areas of rainforest in the Amazon basin. Of these, 424 were operated by Petroecuador, the national petroleum company of Ecuador, while the remaining 62 were run by private companies.

== Creation and initial campaigning (2020–2021) ==
In 2020, Guerreras por la Amazonía was founded, initially by nine girls living in the Sucumbíos and Orellana provinces of Ecuador, including Leonela Moncayo. Alongside the Union of People Affected by Texaco's Operations (Spanish: Unión de Afectados por Texaco) and Elimen los Mecheros (lit. 'Eliminate the Flares'), Guerreras por la Amazonía were plaintiffs in a case brought to the Provincial Court of Justice of Sucumbíos in which they called for gas flares near populated areas to be removed. Amongst the evidence gathered was increases in the number of people living close to gas flares being diagnosed with cancer, in addition to contaminated water across Sucumbíos and Orellana.

On 29 July 2021, the Provincial Court found that the Ecuadorian government had disregarded local people's right to a healthy environment, and ruled that gas flares near populated areas needed to be closed by 2030, with those located in populated areas needing to close within 18 months. It also ordered that reparations be made to people impacted by the presence of gas flares. The Ministry of Environment and Energy accepted the ruling, and subsequently announced its own definition of "populated areas" as being settlements of at least 20 homes within 100 metres of a gas flare.

== Subsequent campaigning (2021–present) ==
Since the Provincial Court of Justice of Sucumbíos' decision, Guerreras por la Amazonía has continued to campaign for the Ecuadorian government to fulfil its commitment to close gas flares. It noted that following the passing of the Court's 18 month deadline for the closure of gas flares closest to population centres on 29 March 2023, the government had only closed two flares; while the government stated that the deadline had been met, Guerreras por la Amazonía and Amnesty International protested that there were more gas flares meeting the criteria than the government acknowledged.

In 2024, six indigenous girls representing the Shuar, Kichwa, Siona, Siekopai, Waorani, and Cofán peoples joined Guerreras por la Amazonía; as of 2025, the group consisted of 15 women and girls aged between 10 and 20. Studies by the World Bank of Shuar communities living near the South-West Station in Shushufindi noted that gas flares had increased by 51% between 2021 and 2026, despite the ruling. Members of Guerreras por la Amazonía observed the station and reported that the flares were only turned off once, during a government compliance visit, and was turned back on after officials had left. Moncayo, who lived opposite a gas flare, stated that while the government declared the flare had been closed, it had instead been relocated two kilometres away in Lago Norte, and had in fact doubled its gas emissions between 2024 and 2025.

Guerreras por la Amazonía occupied solidarity spaces at the 2025 United Nations Climate Change Conference in Brazil in 2025.

By 2026, Petroecuador had closed 183 of its 424 gas flares, while nine of the 62 privately-operated flares had been closed. Guerreras por la Amazonía filed two cases with the Constitutional Court of Ecuador concerning the governments' failure to comply with the ruling. While its first case was dismissed, the second remains under consideration as of July 2026. On 29 April 2026, Guerreras por la Amazonía, alongside the Union of People Affected by Texaco’s Operations and Amnesty International, delivered 492, 174 signatures to the Ministry of Environment and Energy from people around the world calling for the 2021 ruling to be respected and implemented. Following this, the Ministry committed to promoting inter-institutional working groups to make progress in the elimination of gas flares and the provision of reparations.

== Response ==
While the actions of Guerreras por la Amazonía have been praised by human rights groups such as Amnesty International, its members have experienced stigmatisation and harassment within Ecuador. In February 2024, four members of the group appeared at the Biodiversity Commission of the National Assembly, where Andrea Arrobo, the Minister of Energy and Mines, accused them of being "manipulated". Shortly afterwards, on 26 February 2024, an improvised explosive device was detonated outside the home of Guerreras por la Amazonía member Leonela Moncayo.
