= Cofan =

Cofan or Cofán may refer to:

- Cofán people, an ethnic group of Ecuador and Colombia
- Cofán language, their language

== See also ==
- Kofan (disambiguation)
- Cofana
