= Eduardo Mendúa =

Ecuadorian indigenous leader (died 2023)

Eduardo Mendúa Vargas (c. 1983 – 26 February 2023) was an Ecuadorian indigenous leader, environmentalist, and land rights activist from the indigenous Cofán community who campaigned against oil drilling in Dureno, a Cofán village in Sucumbíos Province within the Amazon basin. On 26 February 2023, Mendúa was shot dead outside his home.

== Activism ==
Between 2010 and 2016, Mendúa served two terms as president of the Dureno Cofán community. He later became a member of the Confederation of Indigenous Nationalities of Ecuador (Spanish: Confederación de Nacionalidades Indígenas del Ecuador, or CONAIE), and served as its director of international relationships from 2021 until his death.

The ancestral lands of the Cofán people are located in close proximity to Nueva Loja, the administrative capital of Sucumbíos Province and a major centre of oil operations in Ecuador. Petroecuador, the national oil company of Ecuador, announced plans to expand its operations east of Nueva Loja, including building 30 oil wells along the banks of the Aguarico river which overlapped Cofán land. In 2016 Silverio Criollo, Mendúa's successor as president of the Dureno Cofán community, began negotiating with Petroecuador to build oil wells on Cofán land, and was alleged to have sanctioned community members who opposed this, including Mendúa. Mendúa, alongside 130 other local campaigners, created road blocks preventing Petroecuador personnel from entering Dureno and other nearby Cofán villages. Through his work with CONAIE, Mendúa criticised the Ecuadorian government for failing to consult with local communities about planned oil extraction on indigenous lands, in accordance with the 2008 constitution. He later warned that the expansion of oil drilling in Sucumbíos Province would lead to the "extermination" of the Cofán people.

In the days before his murder, Mendúa took part in a strike led by members of the Kichwa community in El Edén, protesting Petroecuador's failure to comply with commitments it had previously made in relation to existing oil wells on indigenous lands. Two days before his death, CONAIE called for a national strike against the Ecuadorian government for breaking its promise not to expand drilling operations on indigenous lands at a council meeting in Quito attended by Mendúa.

== Assassination and aftermath ==
On 26 February 2023, Mendúa was shot dead in the garden of his home in Dureno by two people dressed in hoods, who subsequently escaped via speedboat; Mendúa's wife, who was with him at the time, was not harmed. An autopsy of Mendúa found he had been shot twelve times, and identified his cause of death as being haemorrhaging and cerebral lacerations caused by being shot with a firearm. Mendúa's funeral was held on 28 February 2023, and was streamed live online by CONAIE.

Hours after Mendúa's death, officers from the National Police conducted raids that resulted in the seizing of firearms and the arrest of a suspect alleged to have driven the speedboat Mendúa's killers fled on. The suspect, named only as David Q., was remanded in police custody. A judge granted Mendúa's wife and children a protection order following his murder. Juan Zapata, the Minister of the Interior, alleged that Mendúa's killers were from within the Cofán community, and that his murder stemmed from an internal dispute over support for oil drilling in Cofán lands among some members of the Dureno Cofán community. It has been alleged that Silverio Criollo, current president of the Dureno Cofán community, ordered the killing. On 28 February 2023, CONAIE called for Criollo to be dismissed, and for his agreement with Petroecuador to be revoked. As of 27 March 2023, Mendúa's murder remains unsolved.

Mendúa's death occurred almost two years after the killing of his brother Lino; as of 27 February 2023, Lino's death also remains unsolved.

== Response ==
Guillermo Lasso, the President of Ecuador, released a statement in which he promised Mendúa's murder would not go unpunished. CONAIE's president, Leonidas Iza Salazar, condemned Mendúa's death, and said that both Lasso and Petroeducador were responsible, citing ongoing conflict in the area over oil drilling between the government and indigenous communities. Andrés Arauz, a former presidential candidate for the Citizen Revolution Movement who came second to Lasso in the 2021 presidential election, expressed his solidarity with Mendúa's family, as well as with CONAIE. The United Nations Special Rapporteur on the Rights of Indigenous Peoples, José Francisco Calí Tzay, expressed sadness at Mendúa's killing, and called on the Ecuadorian government to commit to a swift investigation to bring the murderers to justice. Speaking at a conference of Catholic bishops in Quito, Rafael Cob, president of the Pan-Amazonian Ecclesial Network and Apostolic Vicar of Puyo, said "we raise our voices denouncing this murder and asking for justice".

== Personal life ==
Mendúa was married to Fabiola Ortiz, with whom he had six children.
