= Leonela Moncayo =

Ecaudorian human rights activist (born 2010)

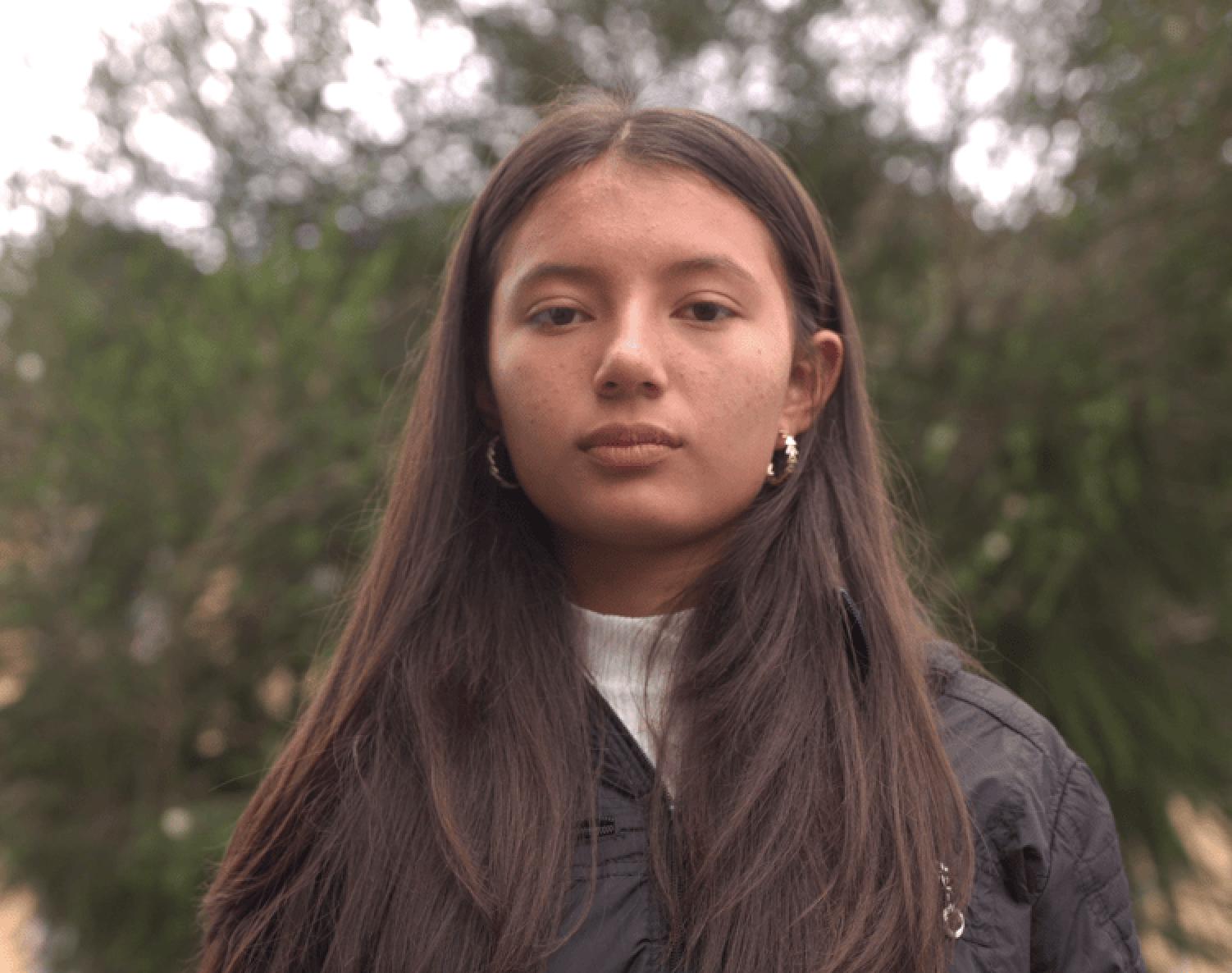
- Born: 2010 (age 15–16); Nueva Loja, Sucumbíos Province, Ecuador
- Occupation: Environmental activist
- Years active: 2020–present
- Organization: Guerreras por la Amazonía
- Known for: Taking legal action against the Sucumbíos government for environmental offences

Leonela Moncayo (born c. 2010) is an Ecuadorian human rights activist. She has campaigned against hydrocarbon exploration in the Amazon rainforest, and was a founding member of Guerreras por la Amazonía.

== Biography ==
Moncayo was born and raised in the outskirts of Nueva Loja, the capital of Sucumbíos Province. The city is located in Lago Agrio Canton, an area environmentally impacted by the petroleum industry. Moncayo's parents, Donald Moncayo and Silvia Zambrano, were activists noted for their roles within the Unión de Afectados por Texaco (lit. 'Union of People Affected by Texaco'), a non-governmental organisation that denounced the environmental and social damage caused by the petroleum brand Texaco in the Ecuadorian Amazon.

== Activism ==
At the age of 10 Moncayo, alongside eight other girls from the provinces of Sucumbíos and Orellana provinces, took legal action against the regional government to demand the end of the use of mecheros, or gas flares, used in oil extraction, which released methane gas into the atmosphere that had been linked to health problems in local communities.

On 29 July 2021, the Provincial Court of Justice of Sucumbíos ruled in favour of Moncayo and the other plaintiffs, which ordered the regional government to gradually eliminate the use of mecheros, especially close to inhabited areas, and to repair any damages caused to local communities.

=== Harassment ===
On 26 February 2024, an improvised explosive device was detonated outside of Moncayo's home, which was alleged to have been linked to her activism. Local authorities offered to support Moncayo and her family, reportedly on the basis that she ceased her activism, which was criticised by human rights organisations.

== Recognition ==
Moncayo has received national and international attention for her environmental activism, including by the British newspaper The Guardian and the human rights organisation Amnesty International, the latter of which demanded Moncayo's safety following harassment levied at her and her family.
