= Tarapoa Airport =

- IATA: TPC; ICAO: SETR

Summary
- Airport type: Public
- Operator: Government
- Serves: Tarapoa, Ecuador
- Elevation AMSL: 814 ft (248 m)
- Coordinates: 00°07′22″S 76°20′15″W

Map
- Location of the airport in Ecuador

Runways
Direction	Length		Surface
Direction	m	ft	Surface
12/30	1,570	5,151	Asphalt
- Source: WAD GCM Google Maps

Tarapoa Airport (Spanish: Aeropuerto Tarapoa) (IATA: TPC, ICAO: SETR) is an airport serving Tarapoa, a town in the Sucumbíos Province of Ecuador.

The runway length does not include 88 metres (289 ft) overruns at each end of the runway. The Tarapoa non-directional beacon (Ident: TRP) is located 0.5 nautical miles (0.93 km) off the approach threshold of Runway 30.

== See also ==
- Transport in Ecuador
- List of airports in Ecuador
