= Secoya =

Indigenous group from the Ecuadorian and Peruvian Amazon

The Secoya (also known as Angotero, Encabellado, Huajoya, Piojé, Siekopai) are an Indigenous peoples living in the Ecuadorian and Peruvian Amazon. They speak the Secoya language Pai Coca, which is part of the Western Tucanoan language group. In Ecuador the Secoya number about 400 people who for the most part are located in three settlements, Eno, San Pablo de Katitsiaya and Siecoya Remolino, all found on the banks of the Aguarico river. Their Ecuadorian territory covers 40.000 hectares along the Shushufindi, Aguarico, and Cuyabeno river in the state of Sucumbios. Until recently they shared territory with the Siona people, with whom they are sometimes considered a single population, although both peoples have independent governance. In Peru the Secoya population numbers about 700.

Despite having long managed their culture, the Secoyas are now in the process of being culturally assimilated to the rest of Ecuadorian society due to the presence of oil companies, missionary activity, and colonists from other parts of Ecuador.

== History ==
The Secoyas have lived in the area between the Putumayo and Napo in what is now Colombia, Ecuador and Peru for centuries. In the 1930s the Secoya people were heavily affected by the rubber boom in the Amazon. As a result, some of the Secoya fled from the Santa Maria settlement in Peru and moved to Puerto Bolivar on the Cuyabeno river. This is also the cause of the split between the Ecuadorian and Peruvian Secoyas. In 1974 the evangelical missionary group Summer Institute of Linguistics facilitated the relocation of some of the Puerto Bolivar Siona-Secoya to their present-day largest settlement San Pablo on the banks of Aguarico.

== Culture and Society ==
An important academic work on Secoya culture is William Vickers' Cultural adaptation to Amazonian habitats : the Siona-Secoya of eastern Ecuador, published in 1976. He describes the Sionas and the Secoyas as a single group.

The Secoya people are organized politically through the Secoya Indigenous Organization of Ecuador. They have been involved in a conflict with Occidental Petroleum over oil drilling in Block 15 of Ecuador.

The most famous living Secoya is Ramón Piaguaje. His painting "Eternal Amazon" was selected from over 22,000 entries by professionals and amateur artists from 51 countries as the winner of the first prize of the United Nations Millennium Art Exhibition in aid of UNICEF - "Our World in the Year 2000."
