= Layan Loor =

Ecuadorian footballer

Personal information
- Full name: Layan Manuel Loor Requelme
- Date of birth: 23 May 2001 (age 25)
- Place of birth: Lago Agrio, Ecuador
- Height: 1.70 m (5 ft 7 in)
- Position: Left-back

Team information
- Current team: Universidad Católica
- Number: 18

Youth career
- –2018: Club Chicos Malos
- 2018–2021: Universidad Católica

Senior career*
Years	Team	Apps	(Gls)
2021–2024	Universidad Católica	82	(3)
2020–2021	→ América de Quito (loan)	38	(0)
2025–	Independiente del Valle	14	(0)

International career^{‡}
2024	Ecuador U23	4	(0)
2024–	Ecuador	1	(0)
- * Club domestic league appearances and goals as of 19 August 2025 ‡ National team caps and goals as of 12 June 2024

Layan Manuel Loor Requelme (born 23 May 2001), sportingly known as Layan Loor, is an Ecuadorian professional footballer who plays as a left-back for Universidad Católica and the Ecuador national team.

== Early career ==
He began his career at the local youth club Club Chicos Matos in Lago Agrio. At the age of 17, he decided to look for opportunities in first division clubs and tried out with several big teams in the country without being accepted in any of them. After seven failed attempts, he tried out at the Universidad Católica, where he was selected among 50 applicants. Initially, he was formed as a left-winger but he was later repositioned as a left back by his coaches' demands.

== Club career ==
In 2020 and 2021, he was loaned to Ecuadorian Serie B side América de Quito, where he made his debut as a professional footballer. He remained there for two seasons.

In 2022, he returned to the Universidad Católica in the Ecuadorian Serie A, managing to participate in 28 of the 30 games of the league and scored two goals in his first season. In that same year, he debuted in continental competitions, appearing in the Copa Libertadores and Copa Sudamericana.

Following his form in the 2024 season he signed for Independiente del Valle in 2025.

== International career ==
In January 2024, Loor featured in the CONMEBOL Olympic qualifiers with Ecuador under-23s and appeared in all four games as his team failed to advance to the final stage.

In May 2024, Loor was named in Ecuador's 26-men squad for the 2024 Copa América. Loor made his debut on 12 June 2024 in a friendly against Bolivia at the Subaru Park in Chester, United States. He played the full game as Ecuador won 3–1.

== Career statistics ==
=== Club ===
As of 30 May 2024

Club	Season	League			Cup		Continental		Other		Total	
Club	Season	Division	Apps	Goals	Apps	Goals	Apps	Goals	Apps	Goals	Apps	Goals
América de Quito	2020	Ecuadorian Serie B	4	0	—		—		—		4	0
América de Quito	2021	Ecuadorian Serie B	34	0	—		—		—		34	0
América de Quito	Total		38	0	—		—		—		38	0
Universidad Católica	2022	Ecuadorian Serie A	28	2	1	0	7 (Note: Appearance(s) in Copa Libertadores)	1	—		36	2
Universidad Católica	2023	Ecuadorian Serie A	26	0	—		2	0	—		28	0
Universidad Católica	2024	Ecuadorian Serie A	14	0	0	0	7 (Note: Appearance(s) in Copa Sudamericana)	0	—		21	0
Universidad Católica	Total		68	2	1	0	16	0	—		85	2
Career total			106	2	1	0	16	0	0	0	123	2
