= Rafael Ferrer =

Rafael Ferrer may refer to:

- Rafael Ferrer (artist), Puerto Rican artist
- Rafael Ferrer (Jesuit) (1570–1611), Spanish Jesuit missionary and explorer
