= Ramón Piaguaje =

Ecuadorian artist

- Born: 1962 (age 63–64); Cuyabeno Reserve, Ecuador
- Known for: Painting
- Notable work: Eternal Amazon
- Children: 4

Ramón Piaguaje (born 1962 in the Cuyabeno Reserve in the Amazon rainforest, Ecuador) is the son of Cecilio Piaguaje, the Chief of the Secoya Indians. He lives with his wife and four children deep in the rainforest in Secoya territory, close to the Aguarico River. From an early age, he drew the rainforest with his fingers in the sand and later worked with black ink on paper. The young man who has captured the attention of the art world was first encouraged in his efforts by Orville and Mary Johnson, Wycliffe Bible Translators working in his village. The discovery of colored pencils at the evangelical missionary school he later attended enabled him to further develop his talent.

In 1993, an American anthropologist, William Vickers, who had been studying the Secoya Indians for many years, spotted him drawing and recognised the quality of his work. He gave him some tubes of oil paints and encouraged him to paint in colour, something which Ramón Piaguaje had been unaware it was possible to do. He spent months experimenting with the colours he had, attempting to replicate the extraordinary range of colours to be found in the trees, flowers, and wildlife around him. Within a year he had developed an astonishing eye and memory for colour. William Vickers helped to organise an exhibition of his work at the Catholic University in Quito, Ecuador.

His painting "Eternal Amazon" was selected from over 22,000 entries by professionals and amateur artists from 51 countries won the first prize of the United Nations Millennium Art Exhibition in aid of UNICEF - "Our World in the Year 2000."

When the elderly missionary couple, Orville and Mary Johnson, heard about the exhibit at the United Nations, they decided to surprise the South American artist. They entered the exhibition hall and found Ramon surrounded by many people. As he looked beyond his admiring fans, he saw the Johnsons and began to cry. They hugged and wept for several moments. In Secoya, Ramon repeated over and over to Orville and Mary, "You are the ones that should be honored, not me…for you came to give us the gospel, and I believe that is why I now can be here."

Since then, he has met the Prince of Wales, who was patron of the event, and the secretary general of the United Nations Kofi Annan, and "Eternal Amazon" has been viewed by ambassadors, artists, dignitaries, and members of the press and public from around the world.

When he won he commented: ‘I entered the competition because I wanted to deliver a message to the rest of the world about the importance of keeping this “lung of the world” free from pollution and destruction. I paint what I see and where I live. It is a beautiful, positive, and peaceful way of showing my world. The forest is all we have. I hope that when people see my picture, they do not just look at my art, but realise that it is their obligation to help to preserve the Amazon rainforest. My tribe, the Secoyas, have lived in these forests for thousands of years and to see a tree fall is like seeing a loved one die. We need the world to help us to protect the rainforest’.
