= Kofan =

Kofan may refer to:

- Kofan, Mali, a rural commune in Mali
- Kofan people, or Cofan, an ethnic group of Ecuador and Colombia
- Kofan language, or Cofan, a language of Ecuador and Colombia
