= Cuyabeno Wildlife Reserve =

Ecuadorian nature reserve

- Location within Ecuador
- Location: Ecuador; Sucumbíos Province, Putumayo Canton; Orellana Province, Aguarico Canton
- Coordinates: 0.1167°S 75.8333°W
- Area: 5,900 km^{2} (2,300 sq mi)
- Established: 26 July 1979

The Cuyabeno Wildlife Reserve (Spanish: Reserva de Producción Faunística Cuyabeno) is the second largest reserve of the National System of Protected Areas (SNAP) of Ecuador which includes 59 state owned areas plus about an additional dozen of privately owned areas. It is located in the Putumayo Canton in the Sucumbíos Province and in the Aguarico Canton in the Orellana Province. It was decreed on 26 July 1979 as part of the creation of the national protected areas system based on the recommendations of the FAO report on the "National Strategy on the Conservation of Outstanding Wild Areas of Ecuador", in which about 30 of the Andean and coastal areas to be protected were based on the explorations of Alan Putney and his team, while 9 areas in the Amazon region on the explorations of Dr. Daan Vreugdenhil. Originally the reserve included only the watershed of the Cuyabeno River of about 155,000 hectares. In 1983, after an invasion the upper watershed, the first director of the reserve, Dr. Flavio Coello and Dr. Daan Vreugdenhil proposed a re-definition of park limits by excluding the invaded zones from the park and extending it to the border with Peru. The Ministry of Agriculture expanded the boundaries massively to 655,781 hectares to cover the Lagartococha river basin. The bounderies were again corrected in 1994 to an area of 590,112 hectares (about 2,300 square miles), which still stands today.

In 1984, the government of Colombia to gazette La Playa National Park with 422,000ha in Colombia. In 2012, the government of Peru gazetted 3 reserves, the Community Reserve Airo Pai with 247,628 ha, Community Reserve Huimeki with 141,234ha and Parque Nacional Güeppi Sekime, 626,000ha. This "trinational nature reserve" totals about 2 million hectares and was inspired by the visionary work of Dr. Daan Vreugdenhil who proposed the Cuyabeno Wildlife Reserve in 1976 and proposed its extension to the border with Peru in 1983, although it was not legally fully established until 1994.

The headquarters of the reserve are located in Tarapoa. The park entrance with the main ranger station is located at what is commonly referred to as "the Cuyabeno Bridge" across the Cuyabeno River. This infrastructure has been financed by the German development Cooperation GIZ and includes a small well-designed airconditioned visitor center, which is well worth visiting.

The lake ranger station is located at the Cuyabeno Lodge, which has been built and is being maintained by the lodge owner corporation, Neotropic Turis, Cia. Ltda.

There are 14 lodges in the upper watershed of Cuyabeno, 2 at Lake Cuyabeno, of which the oldest is the Cuyabeno Lodge owned by Dr.Daan Vreugdenhil. It was built as an experimental eco-lodge in cooperation with the government. Being the first, Dr. Vreugdenhil chose the best location, a seasonal island in Lake Cuyabeno with lake view from its observation deck. The majority of the lodges are downstream 20 - 35 minutes by motorized canoe downstream from the lake. These lodges must shuttle both ways each time they want to take their guests swimming or watching wildlife at the lake or its surrounding Macrolobium swamps.

The so-called Cuyabeno Wildlife Center suggests the presence of some kind of governmental or institutional infrastructure or location in the reserve for the raising or protection wildlife. However, there is no such thing. The name "Cuyabeno Wildlife Center" is registered in the Netherlands, but the website actually books clients at one of the river lodges of a different corporation, about 20 minutes downstream from Lake Cuyabeno. As such it is a misleading name for booking clients for a lodge with a different name and for suggesting there is some kind of institutional wildlife accommodation, which in reality does not exist.

From east to west, the elevation gently slopes from about 326 meters to slightly under 177 m above sea level. The upper watershed being still close to the Andes, the weather seems slightly milder than more eastern parts of the Amazon, with temperatures a bit lower during the day and at night usually cooling to the low twenties (°C) or mid seventies (°F).

The Cuyabeno Wildlife Reserve is an important nature reserve in Amazonia with rather unusual ecological characteristics. Located at the foothills of the Andes, it is different from any other Amazon protected areas in the world. The area encompasses a poorly drained plain with a network of periodically inundated forests, lakes and creeks. Such conditions are rare so close to the Andes, where the drainage in the foothills prevents the development of swamps and lakes. Given its proximity to the mountains, combined with a slightly cooler and wetter climate it may be expected to have a partly different species composition than other areas in the upper Amazon watershed. As all protected areas in the Amazon region of Ecuador, Cuyabeno has a high biodiversity, like the neighbouring Yasuni National Park. However, such claims must be met with caution, as insufficient data of other areas exist to scientifically compare the diversity of areas. Moreover, to the incidental visiting tourist or even professional biologist such differences are irrelevant because all areas close to the Andes are incredibly rich in species.

== Characteristics ==
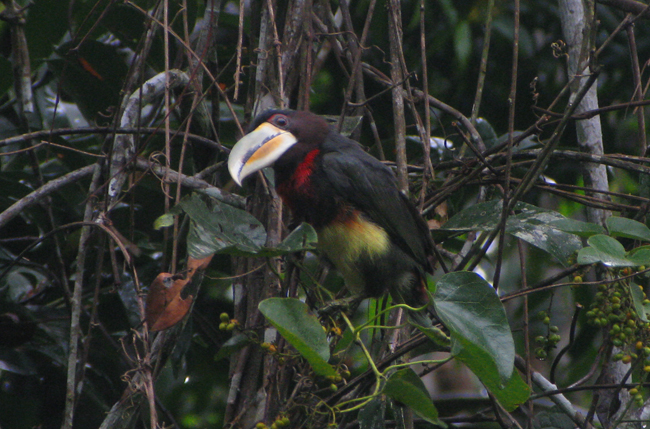
Pteroglossus azara in Cuyabeno Wildlife Reserve, Ecuador

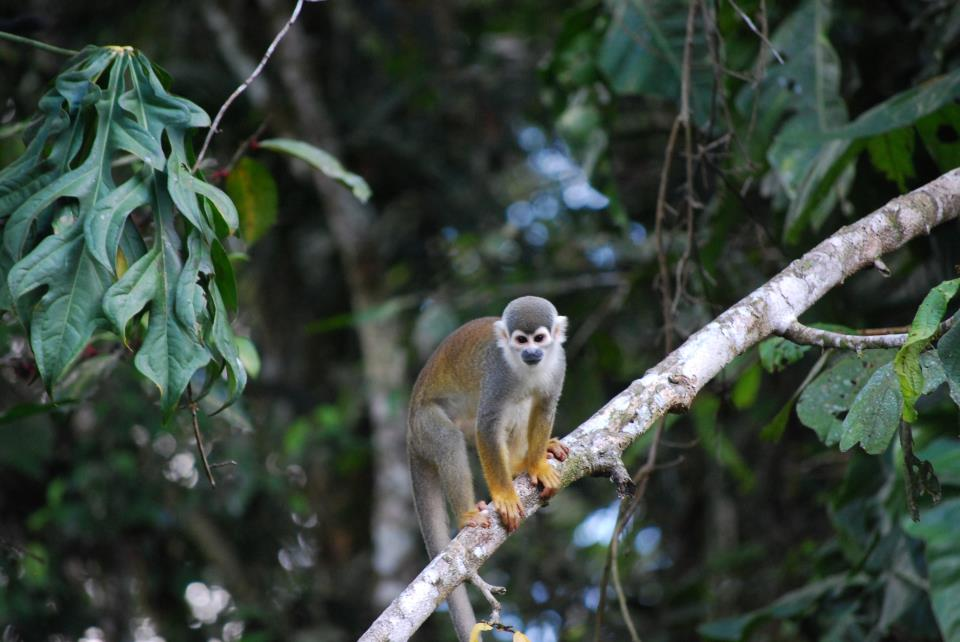
The Saimiri Sciureus, common monkey in the Cuyabeno Wildlife Reserve

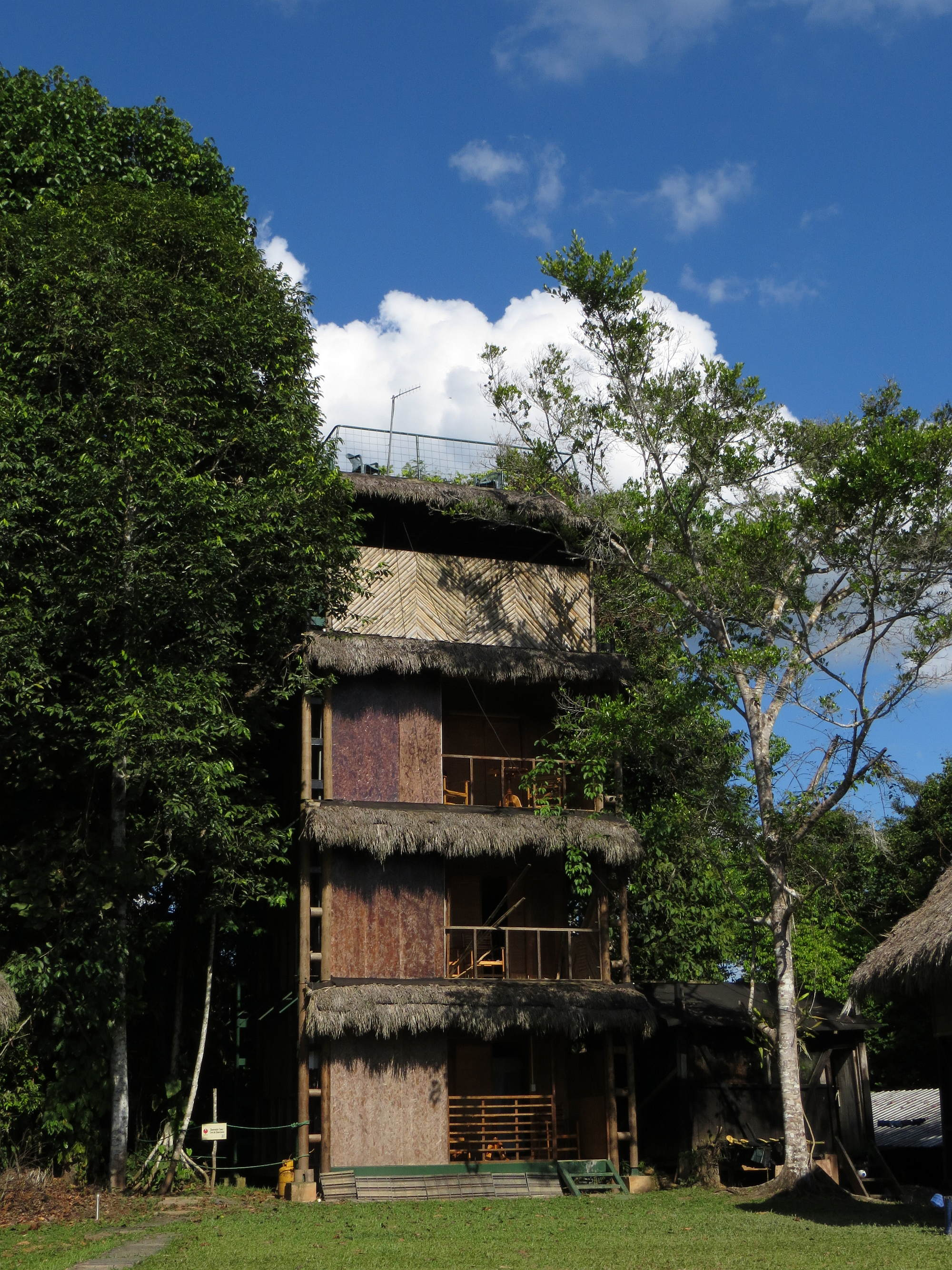
The observation deck of the canopy tower of the Cuyabeno Lodge rises 30m above Lake Cuyabeno. Being the first lodge in the reserve, the best location was chosen by owner Dr. Daan Vreugdenhil: a hill on an island near the shore of the lake.

There are nine major ecosystems in Cuyabeno:

- (1) well-drained forest located on small hills in the upper watershed and the areas between the semi-inundated planes, particularly up-stream from the park entrance at "the Cuyabeno Bridge";
- (2) forests seasonally flooded by sediment-rich rivers, or varzea (Pires and Prance, 1985);
- (3) seasonally flooded forests or swamps, traversed by sediment-poor black-water rivers with a vegetation dominated by Mauritia flexuosa palms;
- (4) semi-permanently inundated forests flooded by black-water rivers, or igapó (Pires and Prance, 1985) and dominated by macrolobium trees which are the homes to countless epiphytes, herons, blue and yellow macaws and hoatzins;
- (5) Submerged herbal vegetation found along lake and river shores; they consist of rooted water plants and shrubs that endure long-term submersion;
- (6) "coffee-and-milk" coloured sediment-rich rivers, the largest being the Río Aguarico;
- (7) "black-water" sediment-poor rivers, like the Rio Cuyabeno tributaries;
- (8) permanent lakes that rarely fall dry, primarily Zancudo Coche along the Río Aguarico;
- (9) semi-permanent lakes - the largest being the Cuyabeno Lake - that most of the years fall at least partly dry.

Black waters (both rivers and lakes) will turn sediment-laden during periods of high rainfall.

All large amazon mammals are present: the lowland tapirs, two species of deer, all Amazon cats, including jaguars and pumas, capybaras, two species of dolphins, manatees, both otter species, giant otters (Pteronura brasiliensis) and neotropical otter (Lutra longicaudis), etc. Monkeys are represented by 10 species, while rodents and bats are represented by dozens of species.

The current number of registered bird species is under debate, some claiming 530 species while others suggest that more than 580 species have been observed, but nobody is known to keep solid records.

At the peak of the wet season, thousands of hectares of forest become inundated, forming an El Dorado for at least hundreds of fish species, 3 species of cayman, several species of boas, including constrictors, and anacondas, while countless frogs and toads sing their never-ending concerts. Dolphins have been seen swimming deep in the inundated forest during high water, as they follow the fishes.

There are two lake areas in the park. The nearest network of lakes is in the Western park entrance (referred to as the Bridge or el Puente), and can be conveniently reached from Quito over an asphalt road. The other lake network is located at the border with Peru, and requires some extensive travel. The fastest way to get there out of Coca, where guests first board a fast river ferry to Nueva Rocafuerte in about 5 hours to spend the night. From there, visitors first visit the beautiful Lake Jatun Cocha to afterwards navigate up the Aguarico River to the lake complex along the Lagartocoche River, bordering Peru. Being part of the Cuyabeno Wildlife Reserve, it is one of the wildest parts of the Amazon protected areas. Visitors sleep with a small Secoya group (7 families) on the Peruvian side of the river. These lake and marsh areas have a different flora and fauna than the forests on the higher grounds in between these wetlands and at the upper watershed.

The inundated forests are relatively poor in species, but they have many individuals of each species. The higher grounds have some of the highest number of trees per hectare on earth and many authors have interpretated that as being the case for other species as well. On one location in the Cuyabeno Wildlife Reserve, 307 species of trees/hectare with a base (dbh) of more than 10 cm were counted. (Valencia & Balslev, 1994);

The river system covers the rivers Aguarico, San Miguel and Cuyabeno along with their tributaries. Aforementioned two lake systems, both north of the Aguarico River, have 13 lakes combined, while the largest lake, Zancudo Coche is South of the river, bringing the total number at 14 lakes in Cuyabeno.

In the rainforest of the Amazon of Ecuador, it is difficult to speak of a dry season, as even during the dryer months of the year, it still rains. These dryer months run from somewhere mid-December to the end of the middle of March. However the beginning and the end of the dry season varies considerably.

The climate corresponds to a wet tropical forest, with precipitation of about 3000 mm or 180 inches per year, and humidity ranging from 85% to 95%. The annual temperature oscillates around 25 °C or 77 °F.

== Ethnology ==
The Sionas live in the area of the upper Cuyabeno river and along the Rio Negro river, where they arrived in the late 1940s (Pers. com. Rogenil Criollo, Victorianos eldest son during an interview by Dr. Daan Vreugdenhil about the history of Cuyabeno). Originaly, according to Criollo, the area was inhabited by the Tetete tribe of unknown etnological background. After a conflict between the Siona and Tetete, the latter left the areas. The Cofans, live Zábalo on the banks of the Aguarico, an affluent of the Amazon. They arrived there in the early 80s after a split with the main tribe in Durano under leadership of Randy Borman (pers. com.). The Secoyas, who in 1975 were observed by Dr. Daan Vreugdenhil on a hunting camp of about 3 men at the mouth of the Cuyabeno River. That group currently live just outside of the reserve. In 1975 and again in the mid 80s during reconnaissance flights, Vreugdenhil and Coello found no evidences inhabitation along the Lagartocoche river at both sides of the border.

A few Siona, Secoya, and Cofan folk are still knowledgeable about the use of natural medicines, but unfortunately, that knowledge is fading away rapidly among the younger generations.

Additionally, new arrivals have settled in the reserve, including smallholders, Shuar and Quichua Indians.

Until the 1980s, the few already present communities mainly lived of fishing, farming and hunting. Particularly animal skins were traded in San Miguel (Rogelio Criollo pers. com). Since then, the life of the indigenous communities in the Cuyabeno Wildlife Reserve has changed due to newly built oil exploitation road in the early 1980s. After the Cuyabeno Lodge was built in 1988, particularly the Siona tribe had access to general ecotourism services, while Randy Borman organized ecotourism with religious groups from the USA for the Cofan community in Zabalo.
