= Puerto El Carmen de Putumayo =

- Town
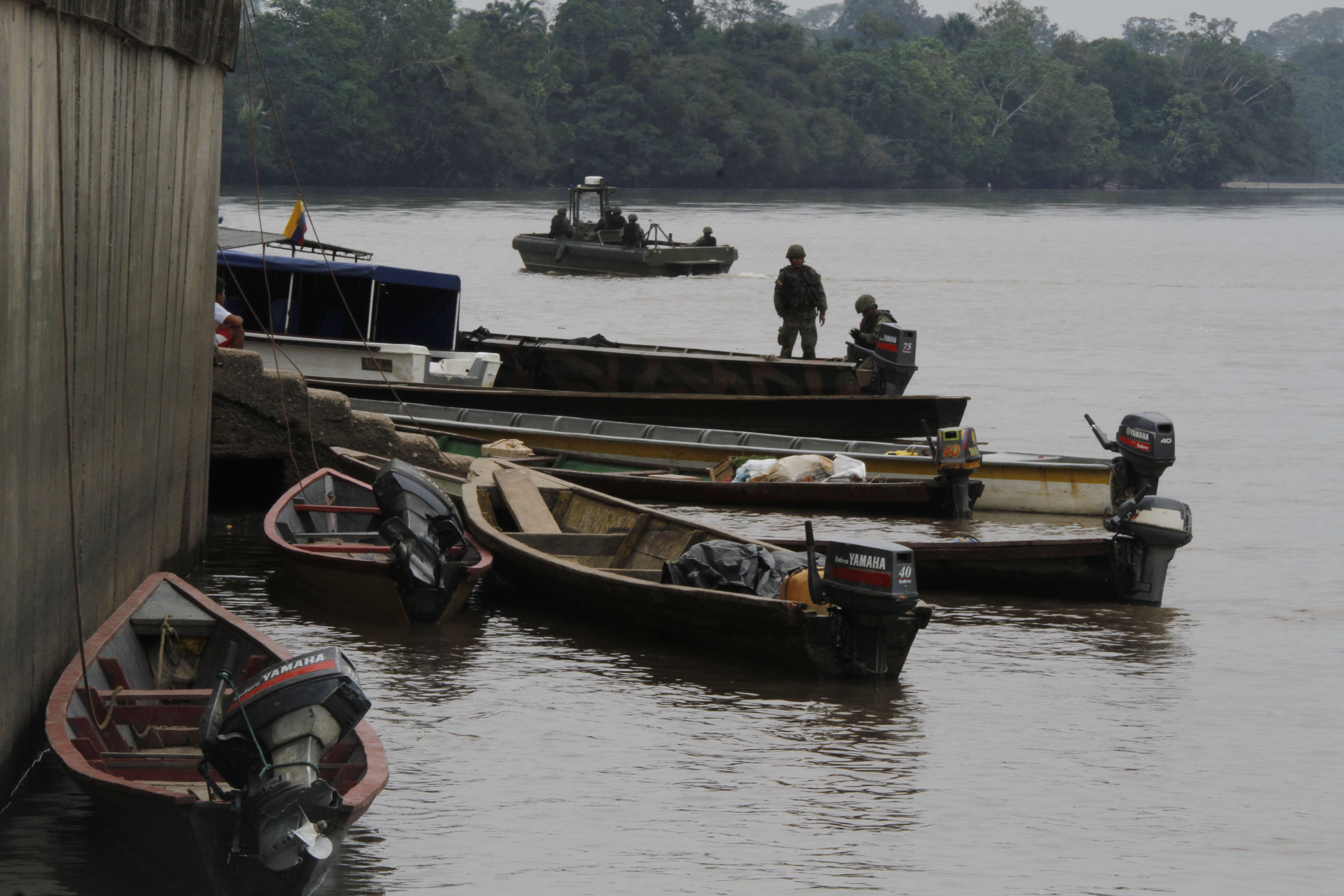

- Location within Ecuador
- Coordinates: 00°06′N 075°51′W
- Country: Ecuador
- Province: Sucumbíos
- Canton: Putumayo

Area
  - Town: 2.87 km^{2} (1.11 sq mi)

Population (2022 census)
  - Town: 2,012
  - Density: 701/km^{2} (1,820/sq mi)
- Climate: Af

Puerto El Carmen de Putumayo is a town in Sucumbíos Province in Ecuador. It is also known as Puerto Carmen de Putumayo and is the seat of canton of Putumayo. The town is located on the San Miguel River and also has an airstrip. With a population of 2,012 (2022 census) Puerto Putumayo, as it is sometimes called in the town, has nearly one fourth of the population of the Putumayo Canton and it is famous for being the easternmost city/town access by road. The national route E10 terminates here nearly 450 km from San Lorenzo, Esmeraldas. Even though it is the easternmost city/town reachable by road, the title as the easternmost town goes to the town of Nuevo Rocafuerte in neighbouring Orellana Province. This town is only reachable by boat similar to the cases in the amazonian towns of Neighbour Peru. It is also known to be in the same longitude as Tarapoto, Peru at 75W longitude.

== Climate ==
Climate data for Puerto El Carmen de Puyamayo, elevation 185 m (607 ft), (1971–2000)
Month	Jan	Feb	Mar	Apr	May	Jun	Jul	Aug	Sep	Oct	Nov	Dec	Year
Mean daily maximum °C (°F)	31.0 (87.8)	31.0 (87.8)	30.7 (87.3)	30.4 (86.7)	30.5 (86.9)	29.6 (85.3)	28.8 (83.8)	29.6 (85.3)	30.7 (87.3)	30.9 (87.6)	31.1 (88.0)	31.5 (88.7)	30.5 (86.9)
Mean daily minimum °C (°F)	21.1 (70.0)	21.0 (69.8)	21.3 (70.3)	21.2 (70.2)	21.1 (70.0)	20.9 (69.6)	20.5 (68.9)	20.6 (69.1)	20.9 (69.6)	21.0 (69.8)	20.7 (69.3)	21.2 (70.2)	21.0 (69.7)
Average precipitation mm (inches)	204.0 (8.03)	177.0 (6.97)	266.0 (10.47)	326.0 (12.83)	246.0 (9.69)	332.0 (13.07)	401.0 (15.79)	283.0 (11.14)	218.0 (8.58)	257.0 (10.12)	221.0 (8.70)	151.0 (5.94)	3,082 (121.33)
Average relative humidity (%)	85	84	85	86	87	87	87	86	84	84	84	82	85
Source: FAO
