= Putumayo Canton =

Coordinates: 0°06′N 75°51′W

- Canton
- Location of Sucumbíos Province in Ecuador.

- Putumayo Canton in Sucumbíos Province
- Country: Ecuador
- Province: Sucumbíos Province

Area
  - Total: 3,527 km^{2} (1,362 sq mi)

Population (2022 census)
  - Total: 9,018
  - Density: 2.557/km^{2} (6.622/sq mi)
- Time zone: UTC-5 (ECT)

Putumayo Canton is a canton of Ecuador, located in the Sucumbíos Province. Its capital is the town of Puerto El Carmen de Putumayo. Its population at the 2001 census was 6,171.

== Places of interest ==
- Cuyabeno Wildlife Reserve
