= Tarapoa =

- Location within Ecuador
- Coordinates: 00°08′S 76°25′W
- Country: Ecuador
- Province: Sucumbíos
- Canton: Cuyabeno Canton

Area
  - Total: 0.8 km^{2} (0.31 sq mi)

Population (2022 census)
  - Total: 1,728
  - Density: 2,200/km^{2} (5,600/sq mi)
- Climate: Af

Tarapoa is a location in the province of Sucumbíos in Ecuador and the seat of the canton of Cuyabeno.

== Transportation ==
It is served by Tarapoa Airport.
