= Cascales Canton =

Coordinates: 0°04′03″S 77°13′01″W

- Canton
- Location of Sucumbíos Province in Ecuador.

- Cascales Canton in Sucumbíos Province
- Country: Ecuador
- Province: Sucumbíos Province
- Time zone: UTC-5 (ECT)

Cascales Canton is a canton of Ecuador, located in the Sucumbíos Province. Its capital is the town of Cascales. Its population at the 2001 census was 7,409.
