= Cuyabeno Canton =

Coordinates: 0°07′44″S 76°24′50″W

- Canton
- Location of Sucumbíos Province in Ecuador.

- Cuyabeno Canton in Sucumbíos Province
- Country: Ecuador
- Province: Sucumbíos Province

Area
  - Total: 3,837 km^{2} (1,481 sq mi)

Population (2022 census)
  - Total: 8,852
  - Density: 2.307/km^{2} (5.975/sq mi)
- Time zone: UTC-5 (ECT)

Cuyabeno Canton is a canton of Ecuador, located in the Sucumbíos Province. Its capital is the town of Tarapoa. Its population at the 2001 census was 6,643.
