= Gonzalo Pizarro Canton =

- Canton
- Location of Sucumbíos Province in Ecuador.

- Gonzalo Pizarro Canton in Sucumbíos Province
- Coordinates: 0.0470°N 77.3228°W
- Country: Ecuador
- Province: Sucumbíos Province
- Time zone: UTC-5 (ECT)

Gonzalo Pizarro Canton is a canton of Ecuador, located in the Sucumbíos Province. Its capital is the town of Lumbaqui. Its population at the 2001 census was 6,964.
