= Cofán language =

Endangered indigenous language of Ecuador and Colombia

Cofán
- Aʼingae
- Native to: Ecuador, Colombia
- Region: Sucumbíos Province, Nariño Department, Putumayo Department
- Ethnicity: Cofán people
- Native speakers: 1,000 (2012)
- Language family: Language isolate
- Writing system: Latin script

Language codes
- ISO 639-3: con
- Glottolog: cofa1242
- ELP: Cofán
- Linguasphere: 81-FAA-a
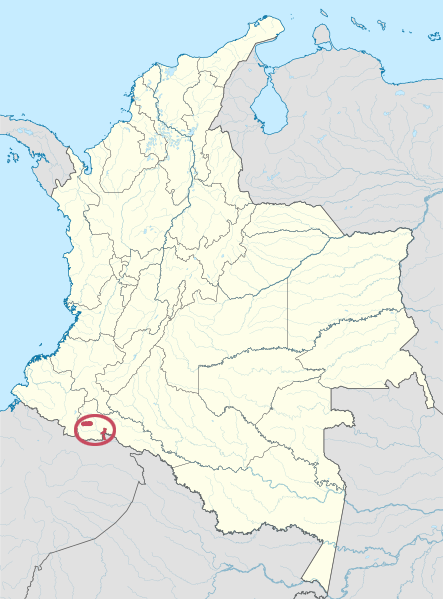

- Cofán in Ecuador is classified as Definitely Endangered by the UNESCO Atlas of the World's Languages in Danger. Cofán in Colombia is classified as Severely Endangered by the UNESCO Atlas of the World's Languages in Danger.

Cofán or Kofán, known in the language itself as Aʼingae, is the primary language of the Cofán people, an indigenous group whose ancestral territory lies at the interface between the Andean foothills and Amazonia in the northeast of Ecuador (Sucumbíos province) and southern Colombia (Putumayo and Nariño provinces), who call themselves the Aʼi. Although still robustly learned by children in Ecuadorian communities, Cofán is considered an 'endangered' language with estimates of around 1,500 native speakers.

== Classification ==
While past classifications have identified Cofán as belonging to linguistic families such as Chibchan or Andean B, it is now widely agreed to be a language isolate, with no known genetic relatives.

== History and current status ==
Aʼingae is a language isolate of Amazonia spoken by the Cofán people in Sucumbios Province in northeastern Ecuador and the departments of Putumayo and Nariño in southern Colombia. The language has approximately 1500 speakers and is relatively vital in Ecuador and severely endangered in Colombia. However, language attitudes about Aʼingae are positive and it is considered foundational to Cofán identity and community (Cepek 2012).

The Aʼi are traditionally hunter-gatherers who historically spanned over a large territory (AnderBois et al. 2019). In Ecuador, the Cofán have resisted conquest by the Inca and colonization by the Spanish, as well as anti-indigenous policies by the Ecuadorian government. The pre-Columbian Cofán population is estimated at 60,000 to 70,000. Though the origin of the Cofán is the Eastern Andean Cordilleras, Inca encroachment pushed the Cofán to the eastern lowlands, which they still inhabit today. The Cofán have undergone de facto segregation codified by the Ecuadorian government, a measles outbreak in 1923 that reduced the population to a few hundred, and illegal oil extraction that threatened the environment in Cofán territory and the Cofán way of life. The Cofán have played a major role in the Indigenous movement in Ecuador, and in 2018 they won a judicial case recognizing their right to decide over environmental activities in their territory and prohibiting the continued operation of mining activities.

The Cofán's religious tradition is shamanistic, and a key cultural value of the Cofán is harmonious conviviality. In addition, participation in cultural practices such as drinking yaje and traditional skills like hunting and housebuilding, rather than descent or ethnicity, plays a large role in determining one's status as an aʼi (Cepek 2012). The Cofán credit their strong linguistic identity for their ability to withstand colonial oppression and protect their traditional way of life.

Aʼingae is a language isolate. The language has considerable Amazonian borrowings from Tukanoan and Cariban languages, as well as many Quechuan borrowings. While there have been previous claims of genetic ties or language contact of Aʼingae to Barbacoan, Chicham, and Chibchan, it has been determined that there are no substantial borrowings. No complete grammar of the language has been produced.

The name of the language, Aʼingae, which consists of the stem aʼi ('person, Cofán person, civilized person') and the manner clitic =ngae, means 'in the manner of the people'. Though the speakers use the word Aʼingae, the language is also known by the Spanish denomination Cofán.

== Phonology ==
Aʼingae has 27 consonants as well as 5 oral monophthongs and 6 oral diphthongs, each with a nasal counterpart which is contrastive. The language is currently considered to have an unknown amount of dialectal variation. It is quite likely that there is some, but no concrete research and evidence has been put forward to make a strong claim either way, warranting further investigation.

=== Consonants ===
The 27 consonant phonemes are listed below in the table with their IPA representations. In Aʼingae, there is a three-way, contrastive distinction between voiceless, aspirated, and prenasalized plosives and affricates. There are no such distinctions for fricatives. All consonants can be word-initial, except for /ʔ, ɰ/. Note that the glottal stop, although phonologically contrastive, can be realized as creaky voice.

		Labial	Alveolar		Palatal (-alveolar)	Velar	Glottal
		Labial	plain	sibilant	Palatal (-alveolar)	Velar	Glottal
Nasal		m	n		ɲ		
Plosive/ Affricate	tenuis	p	t	t͡s	t͡ʃ	k	ʔ
Plosive/ Affricate	aspirated	pʰ	tʰ	t͡sʰ	t͡ʃʰ	kʰ	
Plosive/ Affricate	prenasal	ᵐb	ⁿd	ⁿd͡z	ⁿd͡ʒ	ᵑg	
Fricative		f		s	ʃ		h
Approximant		ʋ			j	ɰ	
Tap			ɾ				

=== Vowels ===
The 5 oral vowels and their nasal counterparts are listed in the table below with their IPA representation. The 6 diphthongs and their nasal counterparts in IPA representation are the following: /ai ãĩ, oe õẽ, oa õã, oi õĩ, ɨi ɨ̃ĩ, ao ãõ/.

	Front		Central		Back	
	oral	nasal	oral	nasal	oral	nasal
Close	i	ĩ	ɨ	ɨ̃		
Mid	e	ẽ			o	õ
Open			a	ã		

=== Diphthongs ===
When vowels appear adjacent to one another, they either become a diphthong (for the pairs listed above) or a glide is inserted if a diphthong does not exist for that pair. For example:

/ho.ʋaʔ.kã.o/
[ho.ʋaʔ.kãõ]
DIST=SIM=AUG
'exactly like that'

/ɲo.tsʰi.a/
[ɲõ.tsʰia]
good=QUAL=ADJR
'good'

Note that the vowel pair /ae/ is realized as [ai].

Triphthongs do not exist in Aʼingae, and glottal stops are inserted phonemically when a sequence of three vowels would occur as in example (1) below.

/ᵐbia.a/
[bi̯a.ʔa]
(long=ADJR)
'long'

=== Nasalization ===
Nasalization is a major feature of the Aʼingae sound system. As already seen, there are contrastive prenasalized consonants as well as contrastive nasal counterparts to all monophthongs and diphthongs. Example (4) below demonstrates their contrasting nature:

(4a) /hi/ $\rightarrow$ [hi] 'to come'
(4b) /hĩ/ $\rightarrow$ [hĩ] 'to exist'

Along with being contrastive, nasalization also plays a key phonological role in the surface realization of morphemes, working both backwards and forwards. The consonants /p/, /t/, /ʋ/, and /j/ all become nasalized when following a nasal vowel, becoming /ᵐb/, /ⁿd/, /m/, and /ɲ/, respectively, as in examples (5) and (6).

(5a) /ha-pa/ $\rightarrow$ [ha.pa] (go-SS) 'to go'
(5b) /hẽ-pa/ $\rightarrow$ [hẽ.ᵐba] (sound-SS) 'to sound'
(6a) /hi-ʔja/ $\rightarrow$ [hiʔ.ja] (come-VER) 'does come'
(6b) /hĩ-ʔja/ $\rightarrow$ [hĩʔ.ɲã] (exist-VER) 'does exist'

Note that nasalization of vowels can cross consonant boundaries when the vowels are separated by a glottal fricative /h/ or glottal stop /ʔ/ (even when a glide is present) as in example (*) above and example (7) below:

(7a) /tsɨi-ʔhe/ $\rightarrow$ [tsɨiʔ.he] (walk-IPFV) 'walking'
(7b) /tsõ-ʔhe/ $\rightarrow$ [tsõʔ.hẽ] (do-IPFV) 'doing'

Additionally, oral vowels become nasalized when preceding prenasalized consonants and when following nasal consonants.

(8) /dɨ.ʃo.ⁿde.kʰɨ/ $\rightarrow$ [dɨ.ʃõ.ⁿde.kʰɨ] (child=HUM.PL) 'children'
(9) /ɲoɲa.pa/ $\rightarrow$ [ɲõɲã.ᵐba] (make=SS) 'make'

They also become nasalized when either preceded or followed by a nasal vowel, as in examples (10) and (11).

(10) /ho.ʋaʔ.kã.o/ $\rightarrow$ [ho.ʋaʔ.kãõ] (DIST=SIM=AUG) 'exactly like that'

=== Syllable structure ===
Aʼingae syllable structure is (C)V(ʔ), with many variations thereof. At minimum a syllable can be a singular vowel and at maximum can be consonant onset with a diphthong nucleus and glottal stop coda. Note that vowel length is not a relevant feature in syllable structure. A complete list of the structures allowed is given in the table below with examples for each.

V	[a.ʔi]	'person'
VV	[ãĩ]	'dog'
CV	[tʃã]	'mother'
CVV	[kʰoa]	'pumpkin'
Vʔ	[iʔ.fa]	'we/they/you all bring'
VVʔ	[aiʔ.ʋo]	'body'
CVʔ	[paʔ.tʃo]	'dead'
CVVʔ	[dʒaiʔ.tʃo]	'chair'

=== Prosody ===
Generally speaking, in the absence of a glottal stop, stress in Aʼingae is found on the penultimate syllable as in examples (12a) and (12b). When a glottal stop is present however, stress is found on the syllable with the second mora before the glottal stop (Dąbkowski, 2020), compare examples (13a) and (13b). This is a stress pattern that is currently cross-linguistically unattested.

(12a) [ˈfe.tʰa] 'open'
(12b) [fe.ˈtʰa.hi] 'open-PRCM'
(13a) [ˈfe.tʰa.ʔhe] 'open-IPFV'
(13b) [fɨn.ˈdɨi.ʔhe] 'sweep-IPFV'

Stress can in some cases be contrastive, compare (14a) and (14b).

(14a) [ˈnẽ.pi] 'disappear'
(14b) [nẽ.ˈpi] 'arrive'

== Writing system ==
Aʼingae has two principal orthographies, both using the Latin alphabet. The first was developed by missionaries Marlytte and Roberta Borman, and first employed in M. Borman (1962). This orthography was influenced by Spanish and thus contained some needless complexity such as representing the phoneme /k/ with ⟨qu⟩ before front vowels, and with ⟨c⟩ elsewhere. Borman also conveyed aspirated obstruents via reduplication instead of via <h> insertion like in the modern orthography. More recently, the Cofán community has created and widely adopted a new writing system which aimed to solve some of the opacities of Borman's script. A comparison between the two orthographies can be observed in the tables below:

Consonants
IPA	Borman	Community	IPA	Borman	Community
/p/	p		/ⁿdz/	ndz, dz (Note: Both Borman and Community orthographies show inconsistency between the use of ⟨dz⟩ and ⟨z⟩.)	
/pʰ/	pp	ph	/ⁿdʒ/	ndy, dy	
/t/	t		/f/	f	
/tʰ/	tt	th	/s/	s	
/k/	c, qu	k	/ʃ/	sh	
/kʰ/	cc, qqu	kh	/h/	j	
/ʔ/	ʼ		/m/	m	
/ts/	ts		/n/	n	
/tsʰ/	tss	tsh	/ɲ/	ñ	
/tʃ/	ch		/ɾ/	r	
/tʃʰ/	cch	chh	/ʋ/	v	
/ᵐb/	mb, b (Note: The prenasalized voiced stops and affricates are written without a homorganic nasal at the beginning of words. This is because word-initially, voiced stops are realized with less nasality than they are word-medially, hence the orthographic representation. However Repetti-Ludlow et al. (2020) found that there is still some nasalisation present.)		/j/	y	
/ⁿd/	nd, d		/ɰ/	g	
/ᵑɡ/	ng, g				

Vowels
IPA	Borman	Community	IPA	Borman	Community
/a/	a		/ã/	an, a	
/e/	e		/ẽ/	en, e	
/i/	i		/ĩ/	in, i	
/o/	o	u	/õ/	on, o	un, u
/ɨ/	u	û	/ɨ̃/	un, u	ûn, û

== Morphology ==
Morphology in Aʼingae consists of stems, clitics, and suffixes. Free stems include nouns, verbs, adjectives, adverbials, and meteorological stems (such as words for "wind", "rain", and "sun").

tse=tsû thesi na’sû=ma da
ANA.LOC=3 tiger chief=ACC.REAL become
‘Then the tiger became the chief.’

tsa sinjûnkhû rande tsampi sepakhue-fa
ANA valley big forest behind-CLF:lateral
‘that big valley behind the forest’ (elic.)

ji=pa ana a’ta
come=SS sleep day
‘After coming (he) slept and dawned (i.e., got up at dawn).’

While many stems are free, there are also a number of bound stems, which typically express states of being or properties, and are in a class of "flexible stems" by themselves. In the following sentence, bia "long" is one of these bound stems.

tutu-fa-’khu=ve=tsû bia-ña=’fa=’ya
white-CLF:lateral=AUG=ACC.IRR=3 long-CAUS=SBJ.PL=ASS
‘They lengthened (the cotton) into white rope.’

Beyond stems, Aʼingae has both bound suffixes and clitics, specifically enclitics that appear after the stem. There are no known prefixes or proclitics. In glossed content, suffixes are typically notated with a hyphen, and clitics are notated with an equal sign. The language has a very rich inventory of clitics, that can appear either at sentence level or constituent level. Sentence-level clitics occur at second position, meaning they attach to the end of the first word in a sentence, and mark qualities such as subject and sentence type.

atesû=ti=ki ke=ja Secoya a’i=ma
know=INT=2 2.SG=CNTR.TOP Secoya person=ACC.REAL
‘Do you know Secoya people?’

Constituent-level clitics can either attach to the noun phrase or subordinate clause, or to the predicate clause. Clitics in the noun phrase occur in a fixed order, and can mark case, negation, and other grammatical features.

jingesû ja-ye tsa a’i cerveza=ma chava-en-je=ni
HORT go-INF ANA person beer=ACC.REAL buy-CAUS-IPFV=LOC
‘Let’s go to where that man is selling beer.’ (elic.)

juva ña dû’shû=ndekhû=’sû dû’shû
DIST 1.SG child=HUM.PL=ATTR child
‘those children of my children’

Suffixes also mark certain grammatical features. Some example include sentential type/mood, nominalization, and aspect. Passive, causative, and shape features are also indicated with suffixes.

jungue=sû=ma=tsû ñua’me tsetse’pa=ve tsetse’pa-en-ñe atesû=’fa
IGNR2=ATTR=ACC.REAL=3 really chicha=ACC.IRR chicha-CAUS-INF HAB.AUX=SBJ.PL
‘What did they use to make chicha with?’

Also present in the language is the process of reduplication, which expresses iterative aspect.

Tsunsi chapejuen akesi kikhûkhûpa
tsun=si chape=ju=en ake=si kikhû~khû=pa
do=DS soften=SH.SFC=ADV warm.up=DS hurl~ITER=SS
"Then they cook and when they're warmed up, we crush them."

=== Inflectional template ===
Clitics and suffixes in the language have a relatively fixed order of how they will attach to a verb or predicate phrase.

Inflection template of the Aʼingae verb
causative		-ɲa (CAUS)
reciprocal		-kʰo^{∅} (RECP)
passive		-je^{∅} (PASS)
aspect		-ʔhe^{∅} (IPFV); -hi (PRCM); -kʰa^{∅} (PAUC); -ʔɲakʰa^{∅} (SMFC)
associated motion		-ʔᵑgi^{∅} (VEN); -ʔᵑga^{∅} (AND)
subject number		-ʔfa (PLS)
reality		-ja (IRR)
polarity		-ᵐbi (NEG)
clause type	subordinate	-je (INF); -saʔne (APPR); -ʔni (LOC); -ʔma (FRST)
clause type	cosubordinate	-pa (SS); -si (DS)
clause type	matrix	-ha (IMP); -kʰa^{∅} (IMP2); -ʔse (IMP3); -hama^{∅} (PROH); -ʔja (VER)
information structure		-ʔta (NEW); -ʔkʰe (ADD); -ʔha (CNTR)
sentence-level		=te (RPRT); =ti (YNQ)
subject person		=ᵑgi (1); =ki (2); =tsɨ (3); =ke (?)

=== Pronouns ===
Personal pronouns
	Singular	Plural
1st person	ña "I, my"	ingi "we, our"
2nd person	ke "you, your"	ke'i "you all, your"
3rd person	tise "he/she/it, his/her/its"	tisepa "they, their"

Second person subject clitics
1st person	=ngi
2nd person	=ki
3rd person	=tsû

== Syntax ==
Constituent order in matrix clauses in Aʼingae is relatively flexible, with SOV (or SO-predicate) considered basic. In embedded clauses, word order is more rigidly SOV/SOPred. Clauses must minimally consist of a predicate.

a’i mani=ma isû
person peanut=ACC take
‘The people took the peanuts.’

amûnde=tshi=ve tsun=’fa=ya
dirty-QUAL=ACC.IRR do=SBJ.PL=IRR
‘We’ll make it dirty.’

chava=ngi fûesû simba-’khu=ma
buy=1 OTHER fishing-CL:angular=ACC.REAL
‘I bought a different fishing hook.’ (elic.)

kanjen
stay
‘He stayed’

Subordinate clauses are strictly predicate-final.

ña=ja asithaen=ngi [kinikhu=ve da-ye]
I=CNTR.TOP think=1 tree=ACC.IRR become-INF
‘I think I’ll become a tree.’

=== Case and alignment ===
Case markers are constituent-level clitics.

tayupi=ja charapa dû’sûchu=ve kaje=ni ja-je=’fa=’ya
former=CNTR.TOP charapa.turtle egg=ACC.IRR downriver=LOC go-IPFV=PL=ASS
‘In earlier times they used to go downriver for charapa eggs.’

The full list of case markers is shown below.

=ma	ACC1	accusative 1
=ve/=me	ACC2	accusative 2
=mbe	BEN	benefactive
=i'khû	INST	instrument
=pi	LIM	limitative
=ni	LOC	locative
=ngae	MANN	manner, path
=ne	ABL	ablative
=nga	DAT	dative
=ye / =ñe	ELAT	elative

Note that there are two accusative case markers. Accusative 2 typically is used in negative sentences or when the P-argument is not yet present or does not exist, in contexts of expressing desire, causation, or creation.

Sentences follow a nominative-accusative pattern. Aʼingae displays optional agreement—optional agreement in person using second position clitics, and optional agreement in number using the clitic ='fa--both of which agree with the subject argument. Within the noun phrase, there is no agreement.

=== Sentence type ===
Aʼingae distinguishes between several different sentence types. These distinctions are indicated using different morphosyntactic strategies. Declarative sentences can contain the optional veridical clitic ='ya. There are several imperative types, depending on what speech act is being performed, using either the imperative clitics =ja or ='se or the diminutive suffix ='kha. There is a distinction between yes/no interrogative and content interrogative sentences, with the former using the interrogative clitic =ti and the latter using the indeterminate/interrogative wh-word in the initial position (jungaesû ("what"), maki ("when"), mani ("where"), majan ("which"), mikun ("why"), mingae ("how")). Exhortative sentences use the hortative particle jinge. Prohibitive sentences use the clitic =jama. Below are some examples of these sentence types.

==== Assertive/Declarative ====
Tsumbate tsa tisema se'jepa
tsun=pa=te tsa tise=ma se'je=pa
do=SS=RPRT ANA 3.SG=ACC cure=SS
"They cured him"

setsa=ne=ta=tsû ji=’fa=’ya
low=ABL=NEW.TOP=3 come=SBJ.PL=ASS
‘They came from downriver.’

==== Imperative ====
tsa=’ka=en tsun=ja
ANA=SIM=ADVR do=IMP
‘Do it like that!’

Me'in kanse
me'in kan='se
no look=IMP3
"Don't look (you shouldn't look)"

injan=’fa=kha
think=PL=DIM
‘Mind you!/Be careful!’

==== Yes/no-Interrogative ====
fûesû=ti jin
OTHER=INT exist
‘Is there another one?’

==== Content Interrogative ====
ma=jan=tsû ka’ni-a
IGNR1=CNTR.TOP=3 enter-CAUS
‘Who let you in?’

==== Prohibitive ====
anthe=jama chigane
let.go=PROH please
‘Don’t let it go please!’

== Vocabulary ==
Aʼingae	English gloss
kase'te	hello (morning)
kuse kuse	hello (evening)
jû	yes
me'in	no
dasû	OK; goodbye
Mingae ki	How are you?
Chiga tsû afepuenjan	Thank you (lit. "May God pay you")
Pañambingi	I don't understand
Ñutshi tsû	That's good; good
Chigai'khû	Goodbye (lit. "God with you")
Junguesû tsû?	What is this?
Majan tsû?	Who is it?
Junguesû inise ki?	What is your name?
Ña inise tsû ____.	My name is ____.
kûi'khû	banana drink
tsa'u	house
a'i	person; Cofán person
ña; aña'chu	meat
na'e	river
panzaye	to hunt
khuvû	moon
kue'je	sun

== Sample text ==
=== Aʼingae passage ===
The following text is The North Wind and the Sun translated into Aʼingae.

Umbaʼkhûniʼsû Fingian tuyakaen kueʼjete afaʼkhuʼjeʼfa {majan de} tiʼtshe kiʼanʼkhe, tsunʼjeninde jakanʼsû tuʼmbia saʼvutshia upûiʼjenga findiyeʼchu ji
[õˈᵐba.kʰɨ.ni.sɨ ˈfĩ.ᵑɡiã ˈto.ja.kãe koḛ.ˈhe.te a.ˈfã̰.kʰo.he.fa ˈmã.jã.ⁿde ˈti.t͡sʰɨi ˈkĩ.jã.kʰẽ ˈt͡sõ̰.hẽ.nĩ.ⁿde ˈha.kã̰.sɨ ˈto.ᵐbia̰ ˈsa̰.ʋɨ.t͡sʰia oˈpuḭ.hẽ.ᵑɡa fĩ.ˈdi.je.t͡ʃo ˈhi]
The North Wind and the Sun were disputing which was the stronger, when a traveler came along wrapped in a warm cloak.

{Tansiʼfate tsa} majan uʼtie tise jakansû findiyeʼchu upûiʼjema ushiʼchhachhu tiʼtshe kiʼañe
[tã.ˈsḭ̃.fa.te.t͡sa ˈmã.hã ˈo̰.tiḛ ˈti.se ˈha.kã.sɨ fi.ˈⁿdi.jḛ.t͡ʃo o.ˈpuḭ.hẽ.mã u.ˈʃiʔ.t͡ʃʰa.t͡ʃʰo {} kĩ.jã.nẽ]
They agreed that the one who first succeeded in making the traveler take his cloak off should be considered stronger than the other.

Tsumbate, umbaniʼsû fingian {ûʼfa kiaʼme} tise ushaʼfanga, tsama tise tiʼtshe ûfaʼni jakanʼsû tise upûiʼjema findi; usefaʼpanga umbakhûniʼsû fingian ushambipa anthe
[ˈt͡sõ.ᵐba.te ˈõ.ᵐba.ni.sɨ fĩ.ᵑɡiã ˈɨ.fakiã̰.mẽ ˈti.se ˈu.ʃa̰.fã̰.ᵑɡa ˈt͡sa.ma ˈti.se ˈti.t͡sʰe ˈɨ.fa̰.ni ˈha.kã.sɨ ˈti.se o.ˈpuḭ.hẽ.mã ˈfĩ.ⁿdi o.ˈse.faʔ.pã.ᵑɡa õ.ˈᵐba.kʰɨ.nḭ.su ˈfĩ.ᵑɡiã u.ˈʃã.ᵐbi.pa ã.tʰḛ]
Then the North Wind blew as hard as he could, but the more he blew the more closely did the traveler fold his cloak around him; and at last the North Wind gave up the attempt.

Tsunsite kueʼje savutshi chanʼjun, tsuinʼkhûte favatsheyi jacanʼsu tise upûiʼjema ushicha
[ˈt͡sõ.si.te ˈkoe.he ˈsaʔ.ʋɨ.t͡si ˈt͡ʃã.hɨ t͡sɨ̃ḭ̃.kɨ.tḛ fa.ˈʋa.t͡sɨi ˈha.kã̰.sɨ ˈti.se o.ˈpuḭ.he.mã u.ˈʃi.t͡ʃʰa]
Then the Sun shone out warmly, and immediately the traveler took off his cloak.

Tsumbate umbaniʼsû fingian tansiʼñaʼchovedaʼya tsa kueʼje khuaʼnginga inʼjani tiʼtshe kianʼkhe.
[ˈt͡so.ᵐbaʔ.tḛ ˈõ.ᵐba.ni.su ˈfĩ.ᵑɡia tã.ˈsi.jã̰.t͡ʃo.ʋe.ˈda̰.ja t͡sa ˈkoḛ.he ˈkʰua̰.ᵑɡi.ᵑɡa ˈĩʔ.ha.ni ˈti.t͡sʰe ˈkĩ.jã.kʰḛ̃]
And so the North Wind was obliged to confess that the Sun was the stronger of the two.
