= Siona language =

Tucanoan language spoken in South America

Siona
- Gantëya coca
- Native to: Colombia, Ecuador
- Region: Putumayo River
- Ethnicity: Siona people
- Native speakers: (500 cited 2000–2008)
- Language family: Tucanoan: Western; Napo; Siona–Secoya; Siona
- Dialects: Ecuadorian; Colombian

Language codes
- ISO 639-3: snn
- Glottolog: sion1247
- ELP: Baicoca-Siecoca (shared)
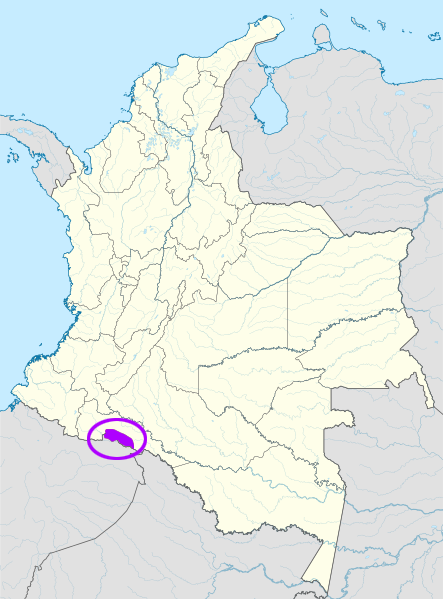

Siona (also spelled Ceona or Zeona and also known as Bain Coca, Pioje, Pioche-Sioni, Ganteyabain, Ganteya, Koka and Kanú) is a Tucanoan language of Colombia and Ecuador. Ecuadorian Siona and Colombian Siona, as well as Secoya, have a high level of mutual intelligibility, but have some lexical, morphological, and phonological differences between them.

As of 2013, Siona is spoken by about 550 people.

== Phonology ==
=== Vowels ===
There are 6 oral vowels and six nasal vowels. Only nasal vowels occur next to a nasal consonant /m/ or /n/.

	Front		Central		Back	
	oral	nasal	oral	nasal	oral	nasal
Close	i	ĩ	ɨ	ɨ̃	u	ũ
Mid	ɛ				o	õ
Open		æ̃	a	ã		

=== Consonants ===
There are two series of obstruent consonant. Both often produce a noticeable delay before the onset of the following vowel: the 'fortis' series (written p t č k kw s h hw) is aspirated, with a noisy transition to the vowel, while the 'lenis' series (written b d g gw ’ z), optionally voiced, is glottalized, with a silent transition to the vowel, which in turn tends to be laryngealized. The glottal stop is faint, and noticeable primarily in the laryngealizing effect it has on adjacent vowels.

Siona consonants
		Bilabial	Dental/ Alveolar	Palatal (-alveolar)	Velar		Glottal	
		Bilabial	Dental/ Alveolar	Palatal (-alveolar)	plain	labial	plain	labial
Plosive/ Affricate	fortis	pʰ	t̪ʰ	tʃʰ	kʰ	kʷʰ		
Plosive/ Affricate	lenis	bˀ		ɖˀ	ɡˀ	ɡʷˀ	ʔ	
Fricative	fortis		s				h	hʷ
Fricative	lenis		zˀ					
Sonorant		m	n	j		w		

- /ɖˀ/ is retroflex; it is realized as [ɾ] intervocalically.
- /j/ is realized as [ɲ] next to nasal vowels.

=== Stress ===
Stress is obligatory on all verb stems, root words, and some suffixes. It disappears when the syllable is not the nucleus of a phonological word. Some monosyllabic morphemes have both stressed and unstressed forms. Although the position of stress within a word is not contrastive, vocalic and consonantal allophony depends on whether a syllable is stressed. Initial stressed vowels followed by unstressed vowels are long and have a falling tone.
