= Rafael Ferrer (Jesuit) =

Spanish Jesuit missionary and explorer (1570-1610)

Rafael Ferrer, SJ (1570 at Valencia – 1610) was a Spanish Jesuit missionary and explorer.

== Life ==
His first mission was to Pasto in 1598, where he encountered the Cofanis, and found them peaceful and receptive. In 1599 was sent to Quito, Ecuador. He went on another expedition in 1604.

In 1606 he was made a master of novices in Quito. In 1608 he was permitted to begin another expedition, and returned to the Cofanis.

His death reportedly came at the hands of the Cofanis, who had been persecuted by colonisers since their first encounter with Father Ferrer, and blamed him for this. It was reported that whilst crossing a makeshift bridge of two logs high over a churning river, some members of the Cofani shook the logs, causing Ferrer to fall to his death. His body was never recovered.

An exaggerated and semi-fictional account of his life appears in Appletons' Cyclopædia of American Biography, which was then replicated in the Catholic Encyclopedia.
