= Cofán people =

Indigenous people native to Ecuador and Colombia

Cofán
Aʼi
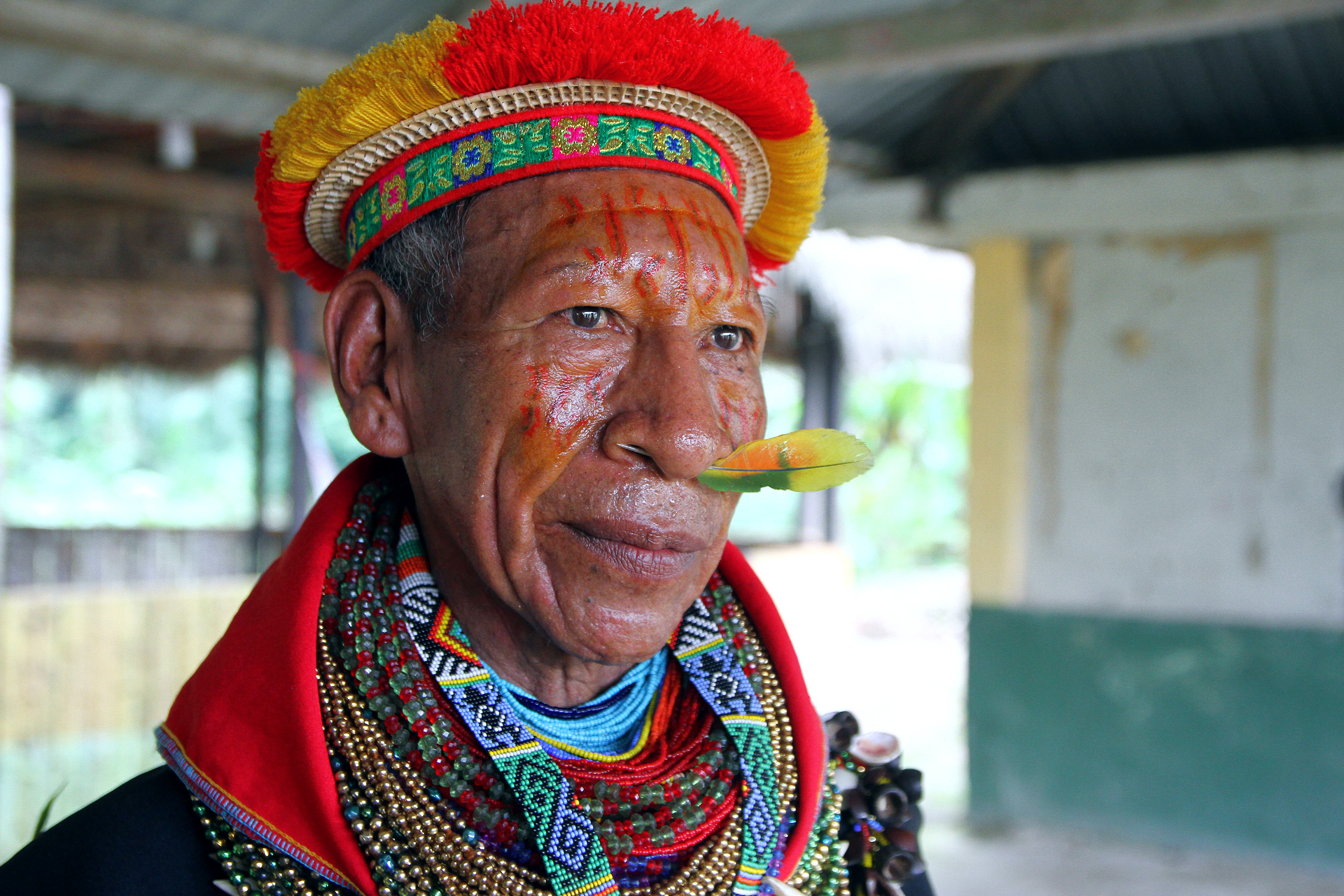
- A Cofán Indigene at the chonta festival

Total population
- 1,500–1,600 (2000 est.) 2,100 (2010 est.)

Regions with significant populations
- Ecuador: 800 /1,600Juncosa 2000, cited in SIL, "Cofán", Ethnologue.(2000 est.)/ (2010 est.).
- Colombia: 600-700 / 500Borman 2000, cited in SIL, "Cofán", Ethnologue. (2000 est.)/ (2010 est.).

Languages
- Cofán, Spanish, Siona, Secoya, Napo Lowland Quichua

Religion
- Christianity, Animism

The Cofán people (endonym: Aʼi) are an Indigenous people native to Sucumbíos Province northeast Ecuador and to southern Colombia, between the Guamués River (a tributary of the Putumayo River) and the Aguarico River (a tributary of the Napo River). Their total population is now only about 1,500 (2000 survey) to 2,100 (2010 survey) people, down from approximately 15,000 in the mid-16th century, when the Spanish crushed their ancient civilization, of which there are still some archeological remains. They speak the Cofán language, which they call Aʼingae. The ancestral land, community health and social cohesion of Cofan communities in Ecuador has been severely damaged by several decades of oil drilling. However, reorganization, campaigning for land rights, and direct action against encroaching oil installations have provided a modicum of stability. Major settlements include Sinangué, Dovuno, Dureno and Zábalo, the latter of which has retained a much more extensive land base.

== History ==
=== Pre-Spanish history ===
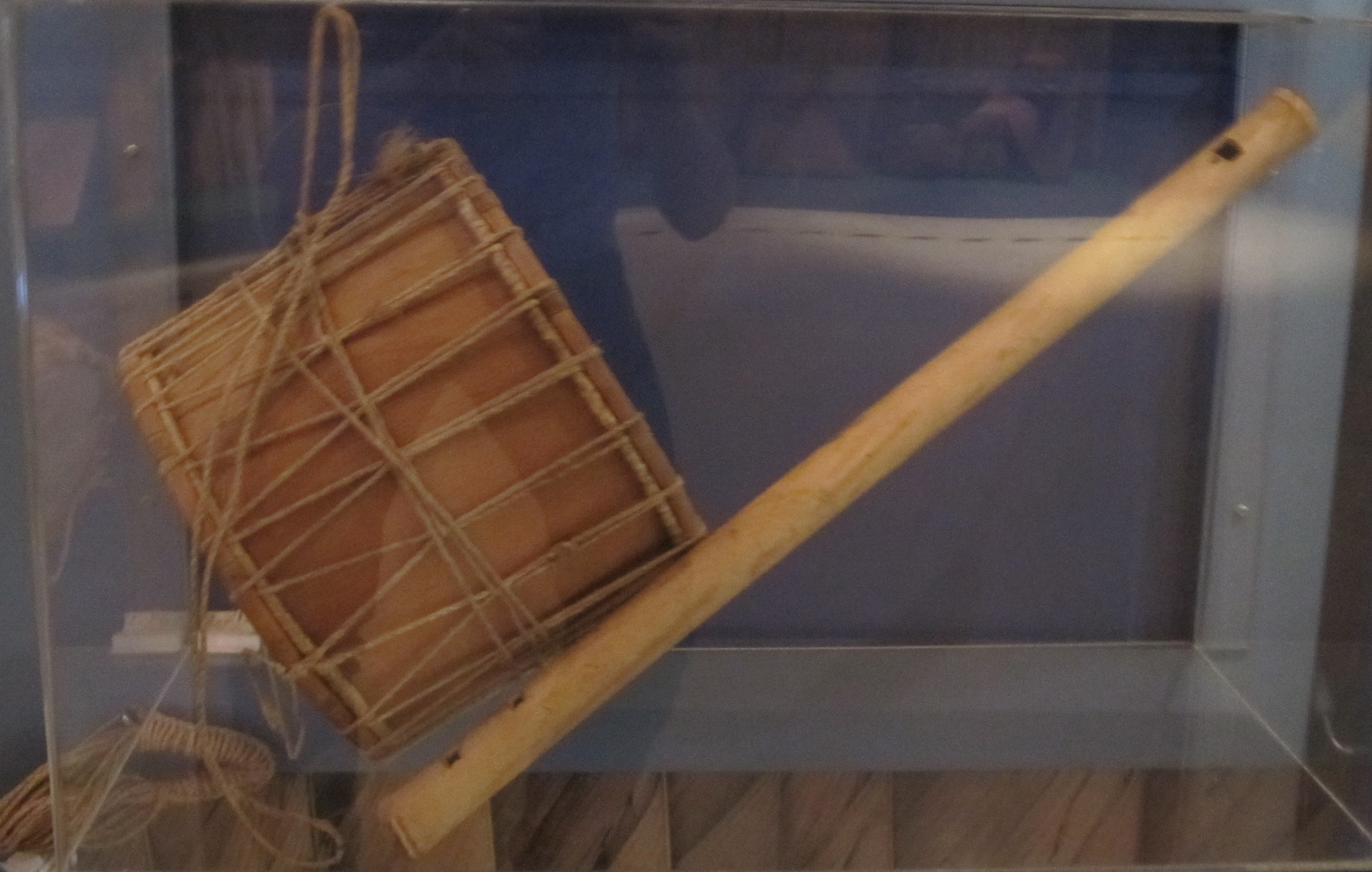
Cofán musical instruments

The Cofán are an ancient civilisation and have lived in the region for many centuries.

=== Spanish colonial history ===
The Cofáns have had many encounters with Europeans, Spanish colonial forces and Ecuadorians and Colombians over the years. They defended their vassals and allies from Spanish colonization in the late 16th century and eventually destroying the Spanish town of Mocoa, inducing a Spanish retreat. Padre Rafael Ferrer, a successful Jesuit missionary who arrived in 1602, was chased out only after soldiers and colonists sought to follow his lead. Occasional visits from outsiders seeking gold, land, trade, and converts occurred over the next few centuries as European diseases caused a population crash.

=== Post-Spanish history ===
The Amazon rubber boom, in the 19th and early 20th century, brought increased contact, especially with missionaries, both cultural and religious. Measles, malaria, and tuberculosis brought the population down to no more than 350; before contact there had been 15,000–20,000 Cofáns.

Randy Borman describes the Cofan response to this traumatic history as follows: an attitude "which can be best termed stoic acceptance of the incomprehensible ways of the outsiders as a survival strategy. Rape and robbery are preferable to death, and if we do not rock the boat, the outsiders will eventually go away, and we will pick up the pieces and continue."

A Cofan Foundation has been formed to help preserve the culture, restore traditional foods in the rivers and to raise money to send children to Quito for education. While the tribe traditionally employs wooden dugout canoes for river travel, they have recently been building large fiberglass canoes for sale as well as their own use, allowing them to preserve the few large trees growing along the rivers. There is no road access to Cofan settlements. Typically a 7-hour trip by motorized canoe is required to reach Zabalo from the nearest road.

Bub and Bobbie Borman, a husband and wife team of missionaries from the Summer Institute of Linguistics, were among the few outsiders to stay. SIL's mission was to translate the New Testament into new languages and introduce Christianity. The Bormans provided medicines, opened a school in the Cofán language, and offered skills training. The Bormans went further by raising their children in Cofán culture and acting in cooperation with the Cofán chief Guillermo Quenama. Their son Randall Borman, became an influential leader to the Cofan people, furthering conservation throughout their ancestral land.

== Oil drilling ==
An abortive oil shale surveying mission by Shell Oil visited Cofán territory from 1945 through 1949.

In 1964, Geodetic Survey, Inc. cleared seismic trails and detonated underground explosives to locate petroleum deposits for a Texaco-Gulf consortium, which were finally drilled in 1967. A road was built in 1972 from Quito to the new oil town of Lago Agrio and oil extraction began. Colonization by landless peasants from the highlands followed. By 1982, 47% of the population consisted of migrants, 70% of whom had arrived in the last decade of major oil development. Meanwhile, oil spills, gas flaring, and untreated wastes undermined the environment, and compromised the subsistence and health of both the Cofáns and the colonists. The rainforest around Lago Agrio has been all but obliterated in this region and environmental degradation is severe, with catastrophic oil pollution in some areas. The effects of the oil spills should have been a wake-up call to stop the oil production in the Indigenous lands. Instead, it did not stop. Texaco decided to come to Ecuador. In 1994 a group of Peruvian citizens living downstream from the Oriente region also filed a class action lawsuit against Texaco in US federal court.

An oil industry waste water dumping pit was dug in the Sucumbíos Province of Ecuador's Amazon in 2005 to the locals' disgust. Two Ecuadoran born Cofán activists, Luis Yanza and Pablo Fajardo, who are demanding that the Chevron Corporation clean up a major toxic waste spills in the Ecuadorian part of the Amazon rainforest received the 2008 and 2009 Goldman Environmental Prize.

Later in 2009, they filed a class-action legal suit in Ecuador against the oil company Texaco, which had been bought out by Chevron in 2001. They legal claim is that, between 1964 and 1990, Texaco dumped 18,000,000 gallons of post-drilling wastewater into the rainforest around the north western town of Lago Agrio, heavily contaminating the land and threatening the health of up to 30,000 Amerindians and local peasants who live there. Cases of cancer had increased dramatically in the region since oil drilling began. Shushufindi Attorney, Pablo Fajardo and two of his colleagues also started their own related local campaign in 2009.

As of 2009, Chevron was also mounting a public relations campaign to tell its side of the story.

The Indigenous Kichwa tribal leader Guillermo Grefa joined forces with the activists, appearing in Houston to confront Chevron at the annual shareholders meeting. Both tribes were upset by what the oil companies had done to their ancestral lands.

In 2018 the final verdict of the Chevron Corp. said on Friday an international tribunal ruled in its favor in an environmental dispute with Ecuador, finding the South American nation had violated its obligations under international treaties.

The tribunal unanimously held that a $9.5 billion pollution judgment by Ecuador's Supreme Court against Chevron "was procured through fraud, bribery, and corruption and was based on claims that had been already settled and released by the Republic of Ecuador years earlier."

On 26 February 2023 Eduardo Mendúa, a Cofán leader from Dureno as well as a director of the Confederation of Indigenous Nationalities of Ecuador, was shot dead outside his home, with it being speculated that this was led to his vocal opposition to oil drilling on Cofán lands.

== The Cofan Bermejo Ecological Reserve ==
=== Area ===
The Cofan are entitled to live in and patrol the 195-square-mile (510 km^{2}) Cofan Bermejo Ecological Reserve (Reserva Ecológica Cofán Bermejo), which was created on January 30, 2002. The Cofan are presently in control of almost 4,000 square kilometres (1,000,000 acres) of rain forest. It is only a fraction of the more than 30,000 km^{2} (12,000 sq mi) originally belonging to their former nation.

=== Agriculture ===
Cofans in Zabalo are currently working to bring back some of the traditional animals of their culture to the tributaries of the Amazon River where they live. They are raising turtles and caimans to be released. They are also starting to raise chickens as a source of food. Many animals that live within their domain are endangered in other regions, including several monkeys, tapir and pink dolphin. All have healthy populations in Cofan territories.

=== Political representation ===
Political representation is through the Federación Indígena de la Nacionalidad Cofán del Ecuador (FEINCE – Indigenous Federation of the Cofan Nationality of Ecuador). Until December 22, 2006, FEINCE was a member of CONFENIAE, the regional Indigenous confederation. Membership was withdrawn, however, in protest to the political infighting presently going on in this organization. FEINCE maintains its headquarters in Lago Agrio, in the province of Sucumbios.

== The Orito Ingi-Ande Medicinal Plants Sanctuary ==
In June 2008 Colombia created the Medicinal Plants Orito Ingi-Ande Flora Sanctuary, a 10,204-hectare National Park intended to protect the plants traditionally used by the Cofan.

== Eponyms ==
The Cofán people are recognised in the scientific name of a species of lizard, Enyalioides cofanorum. They are also the namesake of Osornophryne cofanorum, a species of toad.

== Bibliography ==
- Randall B. Borman, "Survival in a Hostile World: Culture Change and Missionary Influence Among the Cofan People of Ecuador, 1954–1994," Missiology 24, no. 2 (1996).
- Randall B. Borman, "Survival in a Hostile World: Culture Change and Missionary Influence Among the Cofan People of Ecuador, 1954–1994," Missiology 24, no. 2 (1996): 186.
- Hicks, James F., et al. Ecuador's Amazon Region: Development Issues and Options. Washington, D.C.: The World Bank, 1990.
