= Secoya language =

Tucanoan language spoken in Ecuador and Peru

Secoya
- Paikoka
- Native to: Ecuador, Peru
- Region: Putumayo River, Vaupés River
- Ethnicity: Secoya people
- Native speakers: 1,200 (2007)
- Language family: Tucanoan: Western; Napo; Siona–Secoya; Secoya

Language codes
- ISO 639-3: sey
- Glottolog: seco1241
- ELP: Baicoca-Siecoca (shared)

Secoya (also known as Sieko Coca, Paicoca and Airo Pãi) is a Western Tucanoan language spoken by the Secoya people of Ecuador and Peru.

Included among the Secoya are a number of people called Angoteros. Although their language comprises only some dialectal differences of Secoya, there are no other communicative obstacles present. The Siona of the Eno River, linguistically different from the Siona of the Putumayo, say there are significant dialectal differences between their language and Secoya, but are still considered a part of them. In ethnographic publications, the Secoya go by other alternate names as well: Encabellado, Pioje (meaning "no" in Secoya), Santa Maria, and Angutera.

== Endangerment ==
The Ecuadorian-Peruvian War in 1941 had a great impact on the life of the Secoya after it created a separation of the local groups by splitting up the region. This division resulted in the obsolescence of many customs and traditions that were once prevalent in their culture. In the early 1970s, the Texaco and Gulf Oil companies converged on Ecuador when massive petroleum reserves were discovered underground. The extensive periods of oil drilling ravaged many of their settlement areas, culminating in disastrous ecological problems like water and soil contamination. Even today, the Secoya still face many problems involving geopolitical feuds, harassment by oil companies, and the colonization and assimilation of Mestizo culture. The language status of the Siona-Secoya group is threatened, with only 550 speakers in Ecuador and 680 in Peru.

== Phonology ==
=== Consonants ===
Secoya consonants
		Labial	Alveolar	Palatal	Velar	Labial-Velar	Glottal
Stop	Voiceless	pʰ	t̪ʰ		kʰ	kʷʰ	ʔ
Stop	Voiced	m	dˀ~n ⟨d⟩				
Fricative	Voiceless		s ⟨s⟩				h
Fricative	Voiced		zˀ ⟨z⟩				
Glide				ʝ~ɲ ⟨y⟩		w~w̃	

==== Voiceless stops ====
The voiceless stops /p, t, k, kʷ/ are aspirated. /t/ is pronounced with the tip of the tongue making contact with the upper teeth. The glottal stop /ʔ/ almost disappears when not following a stressed syllable.

==== Voiced stops ====
In an intervocalic context, the voiced stop /dˀ/ becomes [n] before a nasal vowel, and otherwise a flap [ɾ]. (That is, [d] occurs initially and after a glottal stop.)

==== Nasals ====
The only phonemic nasal consonant is /m/. [n], which is phonemic in other Western Tucanoan languages, is restricted in Secoya as an allophone of the voiced stop /d/.

==== Sibilants ====
The two voiceless sibilants, /s/ and /zˀ/, are both alveolar, and can be difficult to distinguish. /s/ is pronounced slightly more strongly and causes voiceless lengthening of a preceding unstressed vowel, as voiceless stops do. /zˀ/ has slight laryngeal tension and causes laryngealization of adjacent vowels.

==== Glides ====
The glides /w/ and /ʝ/ are almost equal to the vowels /u/ and /i/ respectively, but more tightly articulated. When /w/ occurs next to a nasal vowel, it becomes nasalized. The /j/ is pronounced with slightly more friction than local Spanish /j/. When it occurs next to a nasal vowel, it becomes a nasal [ɲ].

=== Vowels ===
Back vowels are made with rounded lips and the others are made with non-rounded lips. Nasalization is distinctive among all vowels, and in orthography is written with an ogonek. Nasal vowels nasalize preceding voiced consonants.

Secoya vowels
	Front	Central	Back
High	i ĩ	ɨ ɨ̃	u ũ
Low	ɛ ɛ̃	a ã	ɔ ɔ̃

- /ɔ/ freely varies as [o], depending on the speaker, except after /k/.
- All vowels, oral or nasal, have voiceless lengthening when they occur before a non-laryngealized voiceless consonant that starts a stressed syllable.
- Vowels are laryngealized before /d z ʔ/, but not before the [ɾ] and [n] allophones of /d/.
- When a nasal vowel is followed by a syllable that begins with an approximant or glottal consonant (/w j ʔ h/), that syllable is nasalized, and so any syllables after that. A single vowel immediately preceding a nasal vowel (with no intervening consonant) is also nasalized, except in the case that the nasal vowel is in the remote-past tense suffix /-ãʔ-/.
- Two identical vowels in sequence are merged, though if the result is a monosyllable it will remain long.

=== Stress ===
All monosyllabic lexemes are stressed. In such words a simplex vowel (as opposed to a vowel sequence) is lengthened to the duration of two vowels and has falling pitch.

Di- and tri-syllabic words are stressed on their second syllable. If the consonant of that syllable is voiceless and not laryngealized, the preceding vowel has voiceless lengthening.

When affixes are added to the word, or compounding, alternate syllables take stress. This may result in initial or final stress.

=== Syllable shape ===
Syllables may be of the forms CV, CVV, and in non-final position CVʔ. Root CVV syllables are stressed on the second vowel, whether in monosyllabic or polysyllabic words. However, when a CVV word contains two morphemes, it is stressed on the first vowel, and this pattern is retained with additional suffixes.

The vowels in CVV syllables may not both be rounded. Thus when /uɔ/ would be expected, /ɨɔ/ is found instead.

A /ʔi/ syllable and the /i/ in a /CVi/ syllable drop before several grammatical suffixes.

== Morphology ==
=== Nouns ===
The noun in Secoya is distinguished, in most forms, through the general category and the specific unit. The basic form of a noun, without suffixes, indicates the general category (men, children, canoes, stones, eggs, etc.) without specifying a definite number of elements. To indicate the singular or plural, that is, a number of specific elements, suffix classifiers (in the case of inanimate nouns) or gender suffixes (in the case of animate nouns) are added. To indicate a definite number of inanimate objects, a plural suffix is added to a noun. When the word refers to a number of specific elements, we use the definite article in the Spanish translation. However, it can also be translated with the indefinite article.

Category (General)	Unit (Specific)	Units (Specific)
pa̱i	pa̱i-o	pa̱i-o hua'i
"person"	"person, woman" (f)	"people" (f)
tse̱'a	tse̱'a-quë	tse̱'a-co hua'i
"owners"	"owner" (m)	"owners" (m)
yo	yo-huë	yo-huë-a
"canoe"	"canoe" (f)	"canoes" (f)
quëna	quëna-me	quëna-me-a̱
"wire"	"wire" (m)	"wires" (m)
huea	huea-pa	huea-pa-a̱
"corn"	"cornfield" (m)	"cornfields" (m)
hue̱quë	hue̱quë-o	hue̱quë-o hua'i
"tapir"	"tapir, female" (f)	"tapirs"(f)

=== Animate nouns ===
==== Animals ====
The nouns denoting animals appear in their basic form without suffix to indicate the generic type. To indicate the singular, the suffix -e or -o is added. To form the plural noun, the specifier hua'i is added to any of the two forms.

==== Supernatural and spiritual ====
The nouns denoting supernatural beings and celestial bodies appear in their basic form to indicate both the generic as the singular. To form the plural, -o and hua'i are added. All of these beings appear as characters in the animistic legends of the Secoya.

== Person, number, and gender ==
=== Person ===
The nouns denoting people typically lead gender suffixes with a masculine or feminine singular. To form the plural noun, the specifier hua'i is added. The nouns whose basic form is a verb or adjective gender carry the suffix -ë for singular masculine or -o for singular female. After the vowel /o/, the masculine ending becomes -u and after the vowels /e/ and /i/, becomes -i. (If both vowels are identical, the vowel is reduced to one)

=== Number ===
The number describes the head noun in the same way it does the adjective. Their order in the noun phrase is before the adjective, when both appear.

Cardinal Numbers
te'i	one (m)
te'o	one (f)
te'e	one (inanimate)
caya	two
toaso̲	three
cajese'e	four
te'e jë̱të	five
si'a jë̱-ña	ten 'on both hands'

Te'e hua'ti-re pa-yë'
one machete-cd have-PRES
"I have a machete"

Caya naso hua'i-re huaë-'ë.
two {woolly monkeys} PL-cd kill-PAS
"I killed two woolly monkeys."

Si'a jë̱-ña huë-ña pa-ji'i.
all hand-PL house-PL {to be-PAS.3SG.M}
"I had ten houses"

To emphasize a number, express the same grammatical agreement suffix classifiers in the case of the adjective.

Toaso̲-ño-a̱ so̲quë-ño-a̱-re cua̱cue daë-'ë.
three-CL.NOM-PL árbol-CL.NOM-PL-cd load {to come-pas}
"They came carrying beams, three."

The noun that the number describes can be suppressed when the context permits.

Yë'ë tsi̱ te'i maca-pi oi-quë ñu-ji'i
my child one.M single-sj cry.fz.m sitting-PAS.3SG.M
"Of my children, one sat crying."

Si'a hua'i saĕ-'ĕ. Sa-ni, caya hua'i-re huaĕ-'ĕ
all PL go-PAS go-sec, two PL-cd kill-PAS
"We all went and killed two (animals)."

=== Gender ===
General	Masculine	Feminine	Plural
yo'je (verb)	yo'je-i	yo'je-o	yo'je-o hua'i
"to be back"	"little brother"	"little sister"	"little brothers"
ai (adj.)	ai (-i)	ai-o	ai-o hua'i
"old"	"old man"	"old woman"	"old men"
huano (adj.)	huano-u	huano-o	huano-o hua'i
"old"	"old man"	"old woman"	"old men"
esa (adj.)	esa-ë	esa-o	esa-o hua'i
"fast"	"rapid"	"rapid"	"rapids"
jo'ya (adj.)	jo'ya-ë	jo'ya-o	jo'ya-o hua'i
"domesticated"	"domesticated male dog"	"domesticated female dog"	"domesticated male dogs"

== Classifiers ==
=== Suffix Classifiers ===
The suffix classifiers indicate, besides the idea of a specific unit, the form or function of the object, conceptualized by the Secoya perspective.

-hua	"something that has a defined edge"
-hua	ja'o-hua	"blade"
-hua	ta̱ta-hua	"shoulder"

-hue	(a variation of the above -hua)
-hue	yëru-hue	"shore"

-huë	"something with something inside"
-huë	yaca-huë	"something with a gap inside"
-huë	jëo-huë	"blowgun"

-me	"something in the form of a line"
-me	yëi-me	"rope" (Lit: "kapok rope")
-me	quëna-me	"wire" (Lit: "metal wire")

-mo	"something long, cylindrical and flexible"
-mo	ji̱co-mo	"tail (of a tiger)"
-mo	pi̱si-mo	"thick vine"

-ñë	"something with permanent roots"
-ñë	so̲quë-ñë	"tree"
-ñë	co̲sa-ñë	"Milpeso palm"

-pa	"something that has a flat plane"
-pa	ya'ri-pa	"leaf of a conambo palm"
-pa	ca̱i-pa	"coconut matting (to sleep on)"

-pe	"something with undefined form or function"
-pe	hui'ya-pe	"fat"

-pë	"something with a round form, shows a bulge
-pë	si̱o-pë	"forehead"

-po	"something with shade above or the appearance of a cave"
-po	yi'o-po	"mouth"
-po	ya'huë sëti sa'a-po	"posterior"

-ra	"lagoon"
	cuya-ra	"pond to bathe (tapir)"
	hua'i-ra	"lagoon with fish"

–rë	"something made with mesh"
	hua̱te-rë	"knapsack"
	ja̱ë-rë	"hammock"

-rí	"surface"
-rí	ca'i-rí	"slippery surface"

-ro	"something concave"
-ro	quëna-ro	"metal pot"
-ro	soto-ro	"clay pot"

-se̱'e	"something which hooks or attaches"
-se̱'e	yo-se̱'e	"adze (used to carve a canoe)"
-se̱'e	se̱'que-se̱'e		"fish hook"

-ya	"river, ravine"
-ya	tsia-ya	"river (Lit: surface of a river)"
-ya	sao-ya	"fast flowing river"

-yo	"something long, thin, and rigid"
-yo	sehua-yo	"the rod of a yarina palm"
-yo	hua̱so-yo	"beam"

=== Nouns that function as classifiers ===
The following inanimate nouns can be freeform in some contexts and can also describe the form or function of an inanimate noun.

ca̱	"seed, something small and round"
ca̱	ora ca̱	"chontaduro seed"
ca̱	ne'e ca̱	"canangucho palm seed"
ca̱	huea ca̱	"corn seed"

to̱to	"slab, flat surface"
to̱to	pë'ë si̱ to̱to	"flat surface of an alligator head"
to̱to	so̱quë to̱to	"buttress"

=== Inanimate nouns without classifiers ===
Some inanimate nouns never appear with a suffix classifier; in this case the sense of generality or unit is inferred from the context. However, an adjective or another attribute can change them.

huë'e	"house"
tsio	"seed"
ma'a	"road"
hua'ti	"machete"

== Space ==
Locatives are formed by adding to a basic form, whether it's a noun, verb, adverb, demonstrative, or other, to one of the suffixes indicating space or time.

=== Locative suffix -ro ===
The locative suffix -ro "place" means a point or region. They don't appear with nouns, but with other grammatical forms to form a noun.

ai (adverb)	"vastly"	ai-ro	"the vast place"
jaso (trans. verb)	"shoot"	jaso-ro	"the place to shoot"
ti̱ (demonstrative)	"other"	ti̱-ro	"other place"

=== Locative suffix -ja̱'a ===
Locative suffix -ja̱'a "about, near" describes the relationship of a locative component.

ma'a	"way"	ma'a-ja̱'a	"along the way"
ai-ro	"mountain"	ai-ro-ja̱'a	"by the mountain"
yëru-hue	"shore"	yëru-hue-ja̱'a	"near the shore"

=== Demonstratives ===
The demonstrative pronoun ja "that" occurs with suffixes classifiers, local or temporary, to refer to an object, place or time.

ja̱-pë	"that object with a round or bulging form"
ja̱-huë	"that object that holds or has something in it"
ja̱-ñë	"that object that has permanent roots"

The demonstrative pronoun iye "this" occurs with suffix classifiers, local and temporary, as with the separate hua'i for plural words and maca to refer to a person, place, thing. These refer to a specific previously defined nominal element. When a gender suffix is added, the form of the pronoun is uses i-.

i-yo	"this long, cylindrical, and rigid thing"
ja̱-huë	"this river"
ja̱-ñë	"this woman"

== Time ==
=== Tense ===
There are times for all people and genders, distinguished in the declarative modes of involvement perspective: the present, the immediate past, the distant past and future. The immediate past is not so much of recent events, but events that the speaker considers to be important in the present. It is distinguished by the immediate past speaker who considers unimportant events in the present. That is, they are already forgotten or outdated events.

	Present	Immediate Past	Distant Past	Future
3sg.m	-ji	-pi/-ji'i	-a̱'-ji'i	-sipi
3sg.f	-co	-co/-co'ë	-a̱'-co'ë	-sio
other	-yë	-huë/-'e	-a̱'-huë'ë	-si'i

The following examples demonstrate the present and immediate past tense and use the root caje "down".

Tsia-ya-na caje-ji
río-CL.NOM-DES bajar-PRES.3SG.M
"He's down the river."

Tsia-ya-na caje-pi
río-CL.NOM-DES bajar-IMM.3SG.M
"He went down the river."

This next example demonstrates the immediate past tense when the basic form of the verb ends in [í] or [ʔí]. It uses the root sa'i "go".

Tsia-ya-na sa-ji'í
río-CL.NOM-DES bajar-IMM.3SG.M
"He went down the river"

This example demonstrates the distant past. This category is pointed out with the suffix -a̱'- after the basic form of the verb.

Tsia-ya-na caje-a̱'-ji'í
río-CL.NOM-DES bajar-DISTANT.3SG.M
"He's already down the river"

This example demonstrates future tense.

Tsia-ya-na caje-sipi
río-CL.NOM-DES bajar-FUT.3SG.M
"He will go down the river"

== Modality ==
=== Potential suffix ===
The potential suffix is demonstrated by the addition of -ja̱i on the basic form of the verb. It has the variants -ja̱' and -ja̱ and indicates that the event is to take place.

hue'o-ja̱i-jë̱'ë
cargar-POT-imp
"I'm going to load it."

quërë-ja̱-'a̱-huë'ë
arrastrar-POT-rem-pos
"We will drag it."

=== Irrealis suffix ===
The irrealis suffix is demonstrated by the addition of -ra' on the basic form of the verb. It indicates that the event has not been performed. It's never used with the present or future tense.

Sai-co hua'i pa-ni yëquë ti̱'a-ra'-huë
ir-fz PL estar-sec nos.EXCL llegar-IRR-PAS
"If we were marching, we would come."

De'o-co pa'i-to yë'ë-pi huero-ra'-huë
ser.bueno-fz.F ser-si yo-sj comprar-IRR-PAS
"If it had been in good condition (canoe), I would've bought it."

=== Obligative suffix ===
The obligative suffix is demonstrated by the addition of -ti̱ to the basic form of the verb and indicates an urgency to perform the action. It can be coupled with the -ra' irrealis suffix.

Dai-si-co hua'i pa-ni naso-re hua-ti̱-ra'-huë
venir-cto-fz PL estar-sec chorongo-cd matar-OBL-IRR-PAS
"If they had come, we would surely have killed the woolly monkeys."

Toaso̲ jaso-huë-a̱-pi hua-ni je̱o-ja̱-ti̱-ra'-huë
tres escopeta-CL.NOM-PL-con matar-sec finalizar-POT-OBL-IRR-PAS
"With three shotguns we will surely kill them off completely."

== Predicates and arguments ==
=== Pe'o ===
pe'o -o
{not be.LOC} PFV.3SG.F
"There was none"

=== Peo'ji ===
p'eo -ji
{not have} IPFV.3SG.M
"He didn't have"

== Obliques ==
The use of the oblique case markers in Secoya is not very complex. The oblique case suffixes -na, -hã-ã, and -hã’de are used to express specific grammatical relations. The first oblique case suffix -na expresses the spatial relation of goal, -hã-ã marks objects expressing a path, and -hã’de marks accompaniment.

== Case ==
Unlike Andean languages (Quechua, Aymara), which mark nominative, accusative, dative, and genitive cases, Amazonian languages like Secoya are limited to locative and instrumental/comitative cases. Enclitics are used to indicate grammatical case and the following suffixes indicate the nominal items that are linked to it.

=== -pi (source of action, agent) ===
Ëja-o hua'i-pi yë'e-ni de'o-ye sehuo-caë-'ë
head-nf PL-sj me-cd be.good-pp.nf answer-bto-PAS
"The headmen answered me"

=== -ni (movement to an animate object) ===
Yë'ë pa-co-ni oca-na sao-huë
mi wife-fz.F-cd rio.down-DES send-PAS
"My wife would send us downstream."

=== -na (destination) ===
Yë'ë ja'quë do'i-na moto-pë-re huero-huë
my father account-DES engine-CL.NOM-cd purchase-PAS
"Charge the engine to my father's account"

=== -re/-té (reference) ===
Noca yo-huë-na aya-huë
bananas.cd canoe-CL.NOM-DES add.in-PAS
"I put bananas in the canoe."
