= Nueva Loja =

- City
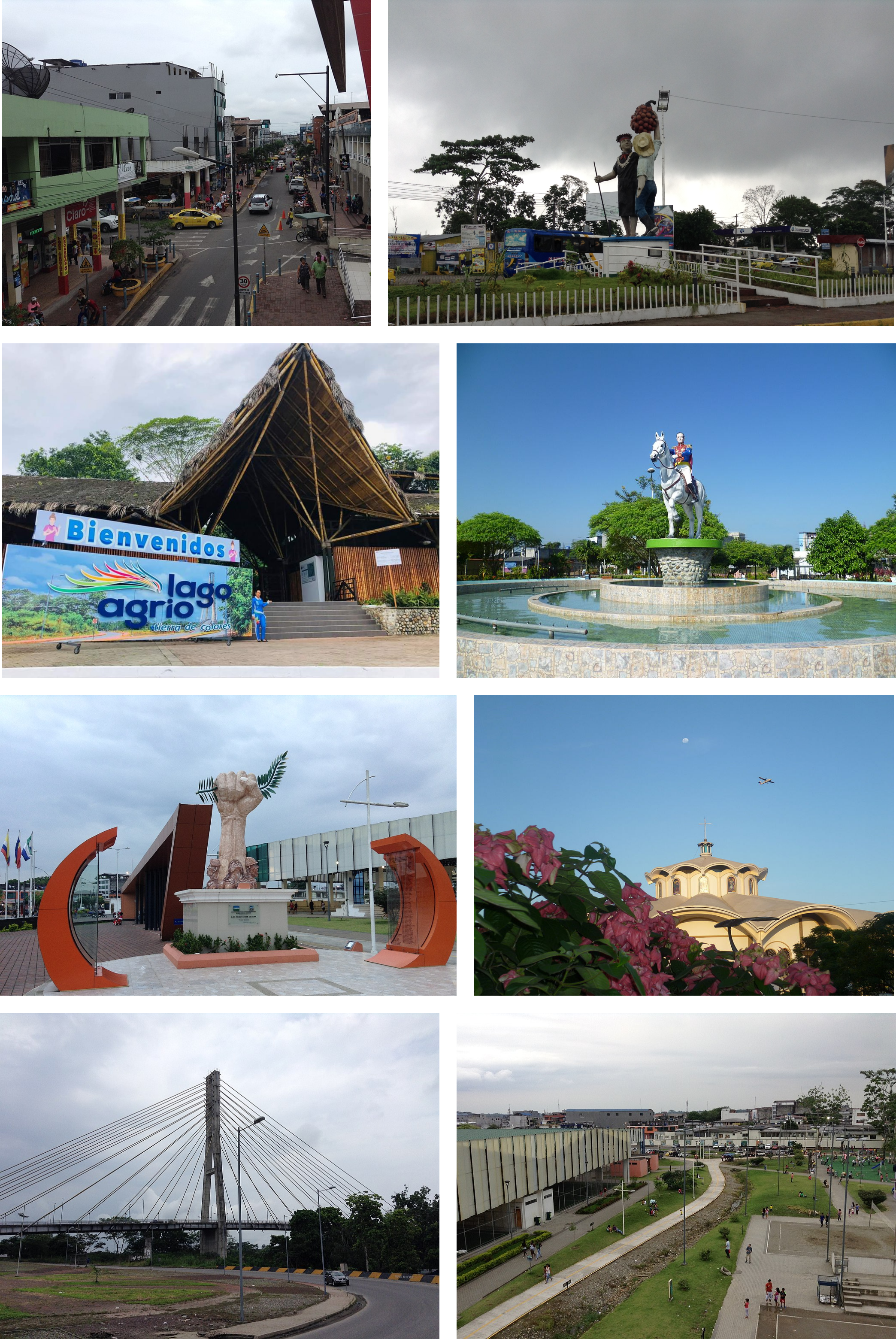
- From top, left to right: February 12 Street, Monument to the Worker, New Loja Ecological Park, Simon Bolivar Park, Monument to the Heroes of Cenepa, Our Lady of the Swan Cathedral, Aguarico River Bridge and New Loja Recreational Park

- Flag

- Location within Ecuador
- Coordinates: 00°05′05″N 76°52′58″W
- Country: Ecuador
- Province: Sucumbíos
- Canton: Lago Agrio
- Founded: May 5, 1971

Area
  - City: 21.65 km^{2} (8.36 sq mi)
- Elevation: 297 m (974 ft)

Population (2022 census)
  - City: 55,627
  - Density: 2,569/km^{2} (6,655/sq mi)
- Demonym(s): Neolojano, -a
- Area code: (+593) 06
- Climate: Af
- Website: www.lagoagrio.gob.ec (in Spanish)

Nueva Loja (Spanish pronunciation: [ˈnweβa ˈloxa] noo-EV-ə LOH-(k)hə), also known as Lago Agrio (pronounced [ˈlaɣo aˈɣɾjo] LAG-oh ə-GREE-oh), is the capital of the province of Sucumbíos in Ecuador. It was founded in the 1960s as a base camp of Texaco. The official population as of the 2022 census is 55,627.

== Overview ==
Nueva Loja is located in central Sucumbíos, in the Amazonian forest, and is one of the most important cities in northeastern Ecuador. Its importance comes from the oil extraction. It was originally named after the town of Sour Lake, Texas by Texaco when the company established the oil-producing settlement. Lago Agrio is Spanish for "Sour Lake". The official name of the Ecuadorian town is Nueva Loja. Its current name originates from the fact that the first colonizers came from the Southern Province of Loja.

The area around the city, the Lago Agrio oil field, has many ecological problems. The rainforest has been all but obliterated in this region and environmental degradation is severe, with catastrophic oil pollution in some areas. On February 14, 2011, a judge in Lago Agrio ruled that Chevron, now owner of Texaco, had to pay $9 billion in environmental damages for polluting the rainforest.

In 2017, the Superior Court of Justice of Brasil rejected enforcement of the 2013 Ecuadorian Supreme Court award, with the Prosecutor concluding that verdict was “issued in an irregular manner, especially under deplorable acts of corruption.”

In 2018 the Permanent Court of Arbitration in The Hague ruled in favor of Chevron and said the 2013 Ecuador Supreme Court case was obtained "through fraud, bribery and corruption."

Manchester United Right Back Antonio Valencia was born in Nueva Loja.

== Air transport ==
The city is served by Lago Agrio Airport, with daily flights from/to Quito.

== Climate ==
Nueva Loja has a tropical rainforest climate (Af) with heavy to very heavy rainfall year-round.

Climate data for Nueva Loja
Month	Jan	Feb	Mar	Apr	May	Jun	Jul	Aug	Sep	Oct	Nov	Dec	Year
Mean daily maximum °C (°F)	29.9 (85.8)	29.7 (85.5)	29.4 (84.9)	29.1 (84.4)	28.8 (83.8)	28.6 (83.5)	28.5 (83.3)	29.3 (84.7)	30.0 (86.0)	30.4 (86.7)	30.4 (86.7)	30.3 (86.5)	29.5 (85.2)
Daily mean °C (°F)	24.8 (76.6)	24.8 (76.6)	24.6 (76.3)	24.5 (76.1)	24.2 (75.6)	24.1 (75.4)	24.0 (75.2)	24.3 (75.7)	24.9 (76.8)	25.2 (77.4)	25.3 (77.5)	25.1 (77.2)	24.7 (76.4)
Mean daily minimum °C (°F)	19.7 (67.5)	19.9 (67.8)	19.9 (67.8)	19.9 (67.8)	19.7 (67.5)	19.7 (67.5)	19.5 (67.1)	19.3 (66.7)	19.8 (67.6)	20.0 (68.0)	20.2 (68.4)	20.0 (68.0)	19.8 (67.6)
Average precipitation mm (inches)	215 (8.5)	228 (9.0)	308 (12.1)	381 (15.0)	360 (14.2)	342 (13.5)	302 (11.9)	223 (8.8)	264 (10.4)	309 (12.2)	299 (11.8)	246 (9.7)	3,477 (137.1)
Source: Climate-Data.org

== Notable residents ==
- Leonela Moncayo, human rights activist.

== See also ==
- Lago Agrio oil field
