= Cuyabeno River =

River in Ecuador

The Cuyabeno River is located in Sucumbios, Ecuador. The river starts in the high part of the Cuyabeno Reserve and ends in the Aguarico River. In the Siona - Secoya language, Cuyabeno means "Kindness River"".
