= Lago Agrio Canton =

- Canton
- Flag

- Location of Sucumbíos Province in Ecuador.

- Lago Agrio Canton in Sucumbíos Province
- Coordinates: 00°05′05″N 76°52′58″W
- Country: Ecuador
- Province: Sucumbíos Province

Area
  - Total: 3,134 km^{2} (1,210 sq mi)

Population (2022 census)
  - Total: 105,044
  - Density: 33.52/km^{2} (86.81/sq mi)
- Time zone: UTC-5 (ECT)

Lago Agrio Canton is a canton of Ecuador, located in the Sucumbíos Province. Its capital is the town of Nueva Loja. Its population at the 2001 census was 66,788. The region contains the Lago Agrio oil field which is at the heart of a high-profile court case against Chevron.
