= Siona people =

Indigenous people in the Ecuador and Colombia

The Siona people (also known as Sioni, Pioje, or Pioche-Sioni) are an Indigenous ethnic group living near the border between Ecuador and Colombia, along three rivers: the Aguarico River, Cuyabeno River and Putumayo River. The Siona live in Sucumbios Province in Ecuador, mainly in the Cuyabeno Wildlife Reserve and in the Department of Putumayo along the Putumayo River. They have a population of approximately 400 people living within dispersed communities. The Siona call themselves Gãtiya Bãĩ, “People of the Wild Cane River,” referring to the Putumayo River.

== History ==
Siona people descended from the so-called Encabellados (the Spaniards came up with the name describing their habit of taking good care of their long hair). The records of contact go back as early as 1599 when the Jesuit missionary first visited the Encabellados. Since then and well into the 18th century, the Jesuit missionary activity had increased as they were trying to convert Encabellados into Catholicism and unite them into reductions. The reductions turned out to be unsuccessful, and eventually, the Jesuits were expelled from the Americas. Siona people refer to themselves as bai, meaning "people" and refer to their language as baicoca which means "the language of the people."

The limited contact between the Siona and the Spanish-speaking world did not last very long and was drastically increased after the rubber boom in the late 19th century. In 1955, a missionary couple, Maria and Orville Johnson of the Summer Institute of Linguistics arrived in Sucumbíos. This led to more contact between the Spanish and the Siona. The Johnsons developed a writing system for Siona based on Spanish orthography, which is to this day used by the Siona people of Ecuador. After the oil companies arrived in 1967, the contact reached a critical state.

== Language ==
Siona is part of the Western Tucanoan language family.

== Organization ==
=== Social systems ===
The Siona people live in dispersed villages near bodies of water (rivers & streams), made up of extended households (up to 20 families). Generally, each family has their own home, although it is not unheard of for young couples to live with the husband’s family. Homes are often constructed on stilts (a style influenced by colonial presence), and in more recent times utilize tin roofs and nails rather than traditional vines and palm leaf roofs. They are traditionally seminomadic, with communities moving every 10–15 years.

Communities are led by shamans or headmen, two roles which became one (cacique caracas or shaman chiefs) post-colonial contact. In the 1960s, the Colombian government’s Division of Indian Affairs División de Asuntos Indígenas (Division of Indian Affairs) put in place a governing system for all Indigenous groups in Colombia, establishing that they must have a governor and secretary. These roles have somewhat replaced the leadership that shamans used to fill, since the last cacique caraca, Arsenio Yaiguaje, died in 1960. Today, this shift in governance has led to more young Siona leadership, rather than the tradition of elders leading, because governors are legitimized by an outside force and don’t have to earn community validity. This has been the source of some conflict within the Siona community.

The Siona people are organized politically through the National Organization of Seona Indigenous People of Ecuador (ONISE), whose president as of July 1996 was William Criollo.

Centuries ago, the Siona people lived communally, and although this practice has evolved under colonial influence, remnants of this communal mindset still govern Siona life. An example of this is the minga: when someone needs help with a manual labor project, they enlist the help of friends and family. In return, they provide chicha (a fermented beverage) for the workers, and the project is a social event that ends in a party. Mingas can revolve around individual projects or can work towards public goods, such as a path for children to get to school easily. Community and mutual aid are built into the Siona social structure. This is also present in food distribution, where when someone catches a big animal, they share it with their extended family. The practice of yajé is similarly communally minded.

The Siona people live in the same general area as the Secoya people, sharing mutually intelligible languages and often intermarrying. They are sometimes considered one Indigenous group. This mixing of Indigenous groups is one method of survivance in consolidated power and culture that has been carried out by many Indigenous groups all over the world.

=== Practices of farming and hunting ===
A diverse subsistence economy is employed by the Siona people, including slash-and-burn agriculture, fishing, gardening and hunting as well as imported foods (72).

The core vegetables that make up the Siona diet are manioc (a root vegetable, also known as cassava) and plantain (70), which are cultivated on small farms. Families also often have gardens around the house, cultivating flowers, tobacco, cotton, or fruit trees. Staple foods are chucula (plantain drink), cassava (manioc flatbread), chicha (fermented drink made of manioc and plantain), and manioc flour. Popular fruits are pineapple, sugarcane, papaya, guayaba, and tree grape. Diets have changed because of colonial influence, and non-Indigenous imported foods have also become staples, including rice, noodles, and chicken, and a preference for sugary beverages like guarapo instead of the traditional chicha.

In hunting, Siona people prioritize large animals including ungulates (tapir, peccaries), primates (woolly monkeys, howler monkeys) and large birds (curassow, guans). Traditional tools include the blow gun, spear and traps, although in recent decades, the shotgun has dominated as an efficient manner of hunting. Siona people hunt and forage within large territories, consisting of hundreds of square kilometers. Hunting is generally done by the men, although because of modernization, men are hunting less because of an increased reliance on imported foods and external structures of work (and not necessarily because of lack of game).

== Religious practices ==
=== Worldview ===
The following is a description of the Siona worldview, as compiled through conversations with six Siona elders. The Siona see the world as divided into five realms, described as looking like cassava griddles, with sequentially smaller sizes. The bottom-most realm is “inside the earth” followed by four “heavens,” the first of which is the earth that is readily perceived. Natural things (trees, clay, animals) are associated with beings and forces in other realms (counterparts), and the realms affect each other interdependently. Other realms and communication with the beings in them can be accessed through yajé ceremonies. These communications and interactions often involve transformations, as there is a fluidity of being between realms (for example, in yajé ceremonies, participants sometimes transform into animals).

==== Shamanism ====
Shamans serve both as spiritual leaders, and in recent decades, as political leaders as well, becoming known as cacique curacas (“shaman chiefs”). The shaman has many duties in Siona life, including administering punishment for poor behavior, facilitating marriages, and distributing food. One of their most significant roles is serving as guides for yajé ceremonies. They are the providers and protectors of their communities.

Shamans began taking on the role of cacique caraca (shaman chief) after colonial contact, likely as a way to consolidate power and resist colonial powers. This system collapsed after the last cacique caraca, Arsenio Yaiguaje, died in 1960 and no shaman assumed the role. Among other factors, assimilation through a boarding school (in nearby Puerto Asís) under the control of Capuchin missionaries (Order of Friars Minor Capuchin) interfered with shamanic apprenticeships; some prohibitionary practices of shaman apprenticeships were difficult to observe under missionary influence. In the time since this loss of culture however, the shaman system has begun being rebuilt since the 1990s and the global trend of Indigenous revitalization.

=== Yajé ===
Yajé (pronounced ya-hay; also spelled yagé or yahé) is a tea made from a vine (Banisteriopsis caapi) that produces psychedelic experiences and allows the Siona to communicate with other realms. According to an organization that facilitates tourist yajé experiences, yajé is the same plant as ayahuasca, its main distinction being cultural and in how it is prepared. Yajé is used by Siona people, under the guidance of a shaman, as mediation and communication with other realms, for wellbeing (community or individual) related to game, weather, sickness, or misfortune.

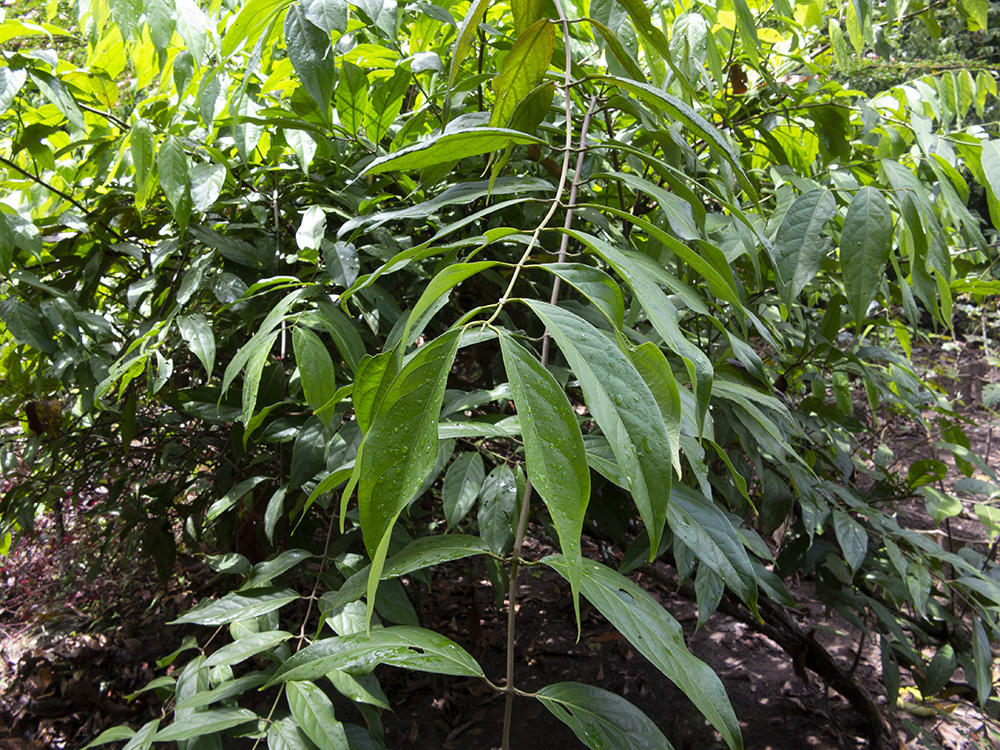
The yajé vine

By some accounts, a yajé ritual is usually 3 days long: the first night involves no singing, the second night involves singing & transformation into animals, and the third night culminates in reaching other realms. Each night’s experience lasts from sundown to sunrise. The shaman guides participants through the process, helping them when they may come across ill-intentioned beings. The shaman also leads chants during the yajé ceremony which can help promote communal images, an example of the strong communal focus of the Siona people. The ceremony is conducted inside a specifically designated yajé house, and participants dress ceremonially, with feather crowns, beads, aromatic herbs, and face paintings.

One aspect of this ritual process that is distinctive to the Siona is their association of yajé with creative practices reflective of geometric designs seen during the yajé experience. These designs are translated into face paintings and decorations on possessions such as pots.

== Challenges and Siona responses ==
=== Intrusion and assimilation ===
Spanish colonists have long been intruding on Siona territory. Because of displacement from the rubber boom and indentured servitude in the 1800s, the Siona people have been broken into three main communities/regions: the Aguarico, Cuyabeno and Putumayo. As the Siona are pushed further into the forest, they are forced onto swampier land that makes transportation more difficult.

This intrusion has also been accompanied by forced assimilation. Capuchin missionaries and their boarding school in Puerto Asís were a particular proponent of this, as they taught students to disassociate with their culture. The tourist industry has also had a role in this, as working for outside actors has led to a loss of culture & language as well as immigration to neighboring cities, gender issues, and economic dependency on tourism revenues. Armed conflict in the area has also led to people leaving the community to move to cities.

Despite these challenges, the Siona people have fought to hold onto their land and culture. In 1989, after much more difficult organizing, the Siona-Secoya people gained legal rights to 31,414 hectares of their territory (still smaller than their historical territories). In response to encroachment by oil company Amerisur, the Siona people created the Buenavista Indigenous guard to protect the community through spiritual, political and educational approaches. The group is open to all members of the community and is building sovereign Siona power. Additionally, the Ceibo Alliance, an indigenous-led, Ecuador-based non-profit, is working to help revive Siona cultural identity by supporting yajé house construction, facilitating workshops with elders, encouraging women-led enterprise, and protecting the yajé vine.

=== Deforestation and pollution ===
Palm oil companies have decimated forests and replaced them with African palm trees, a significant threat to the biodiversity of the region. These palm oil plantations also result in chemical runoff from agribusiness that contaminates the waterways Indigenous people in the area rely so heavily on. Pollution from the oil industry’s presence in the area has resulted in contaminated groundwater from improperly disposed of waste. All of these intrusions have represented threats to the Siona community and the lands they rely on.

The Siona community has actively fought back against these disruptions, and in 1933, they filed a class-action lawsuit in coalition with four other indigenous groups against Texaco (Aguinda v. Texaco, Inc.) for the pollution the oil company has caused to the community. The case was dismissed, but set a precedent for Indigenous action against corporations.

=== Armed groups ===
Many armed groups exist in the area where the Siona people live, and Siona people are frequently in danger of being caught in the crossfire or being added to “blacklists.” Much of this violence is due to civil unrest within Colombia that has been occurring since the 1960s, between the Colombian Army, right-wing militias, and FARC (Revolutionary Armed Forces of Colombia). FARC planted land mines decades ago, but they continue to threaten the Siona (and other Indigenous groups): over 11,000 Colombians have been killed or injured by land mines, at least 300 were Indigenous peoples. The FARC landmines make it so that the Siona people cannot move freely through their ancestral lands.

In response, many Siona have become involved in the Colombian Campaign to Ban Landmines (CCBL), which works to identify and remove land mines from the area. This is part of an effort to get Siona people who have fled to cities to feel safe enough to move back to their homes. Siona teacher and member of the CCBL Adiela Jinet Mera imagined, “One day, when I am old, I dream that our young people will defend our territory.”
