= Extinction Rebellion =

Environmental pressure group

- Named after: Anthropocene extinction
- Formation: 31 October 2018; 8 years ago
- Founders: Gail Bradbrook; Roger Hallam; Simon Bramwell; Stuart Basden; Clare Farrell; Robin Boardman-Pattinson; 4 others
- Founded at: Stroud, England
- Type: Advocacy group
- Purpose: Climate change mitigation Nature conservation Environmental protection Societal transformation to a regenerative culture Sortition
- Region served: International
- Fields: Conservation movement Environmental movement
- Affiliations: Rising Up! Animal Rebellion; XR Youth
- Website: rebellion.global

Extinction Rebellion (abbreviated as XR) is a UK-founded global environmental movement, with the stated aim of using nonviolent civil disobedience to compel government action to avoid tipping points in the climate system, biodiversity loss, and the risk of social and ecological collapse. Extinction Rebellion was established in Stroud in May 2018 by Gail Bradbrook, Simon Bramwell, Roger Hallam, and Stuart Basden, along with six other co-founders from the campaign group Rising Up!

Its first major action was to occupy the London Greenpeace offices on 17 October 2018, which was followed by the public launch at the "Declaration of Rebellion" on 31 October 2018 outside the UK Parliament. Earlier that month, about one hundred academics signed a call to action in their support. In November 2018, five bridges across the River Thames in London were blockaded as a protest. In April 2019, Extinction Rebellion occupied five prominent sites in central London: Piccadilly Circus, Oxford Circus, Marble Arch, Waterloo Bridge, and the area around Parliament Square. In August 2021, the Impossible Rebellion, a series of nonviolent climate change protests organized by Extinction Rebellion, targeted London.

Citing inspiration from grassroots movements such as Occupy, the suffragettes, and the civil rights movement, Extinction Rebellion aims to instill a sense of urgency for preventing further "climate breakdown", as well as the ongoing sixth mass extinction. A number of activists in the movement accept arrest and imprisonment, similar to the mass arrest tactics of the Committee of 100 in 1961. The movement uses a stylised, circled hourglass, known as the extinction symbol, to serve as a warning that time is rapidly running out for many species.

Extinction Rebellion has been criticised as alienating potential supporters. Extinction Rebellion's 2019 protests cost the Metropolitan Police an extra £7.5 million. Activists identifying with the movement have also defended causing property damage, such as smashing windows. In a YouGov poll of 3,482 British adults conducted on 15 October 2019, 54% "strongly opposed" or "somewhat opposed" Extinction Rebellion's actions of disrupting roads and public transport to "shut down London" in order to bring attention to their cause, while 36% "strongly supported" or "somewhat supported" these actions.

== Stated aims and principles ==
=== Aims ===
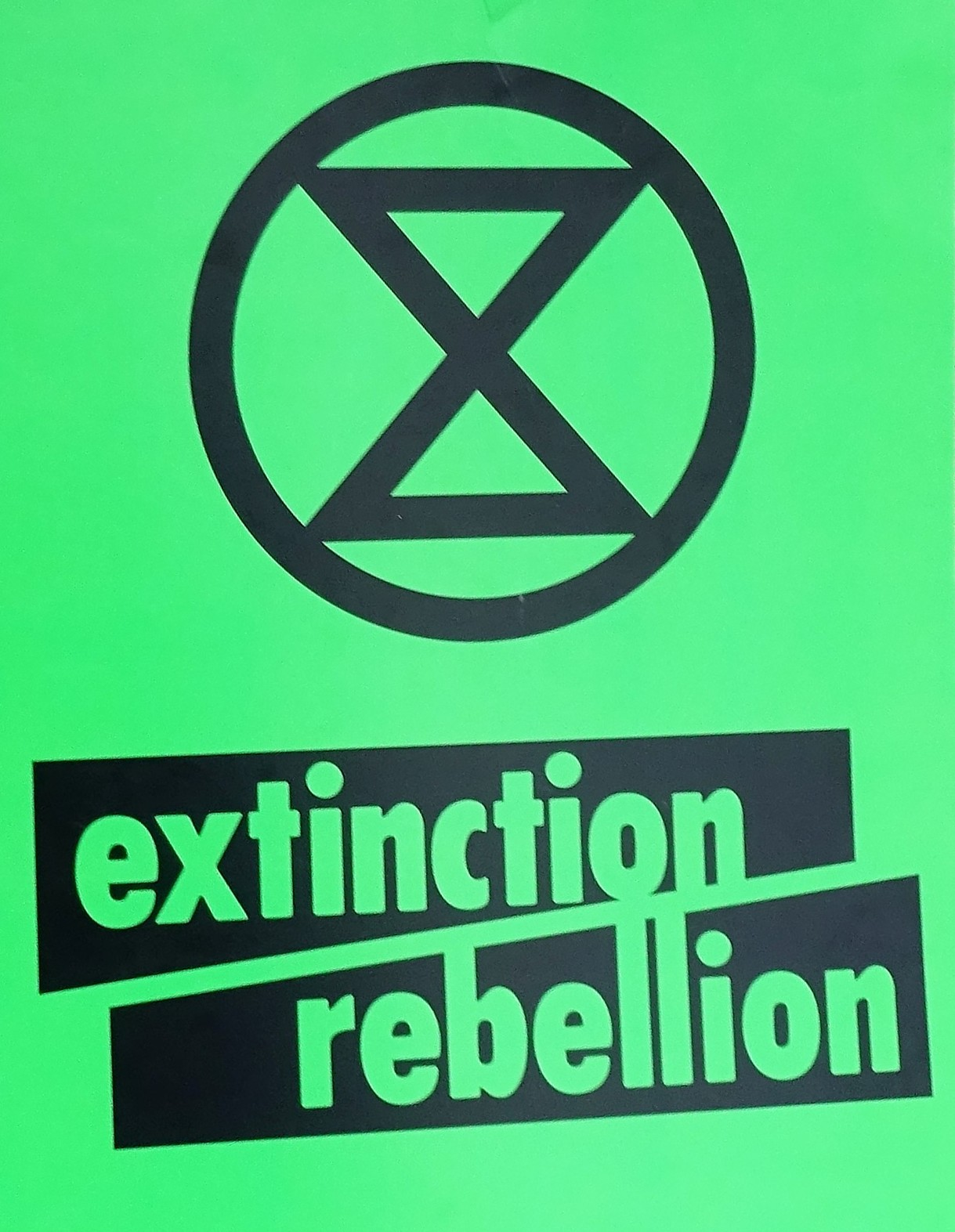
Extinction Rebellion placard containing its logotype with the extinction symbol

Extinction Rebellion's website, at the time of the group's inception in the UK, stated the following aims:

- Government must tell the truth by declaring a climate and ecological emergency, working with other institutions to communicate the urgency for change.
- Government must act now to halt biodiversity loss and reduce greenhouse gas emissions to net-zero by 2025.
- Government must create, and be led by the decisions of, a citizens' assembly on climate and ecological justice.

When the movement expanded to the United States, a further demand was added to that group's list: "We demand a just transition that prioritizes the most vulnerable people and indigenous sovereignty; establishes reparations and remediation led by and for Black people, Indigenous people, people of colour and poor communities for years of environmental injustice, establishes legal rights for ecosystems to thrive and regenerate in perpetuity, and repairs the effects of ongoing ecocide to prevent extinction of human and all species, in order to maintain a livable, just planet for all."

== Organisation ==
=== Structure ===
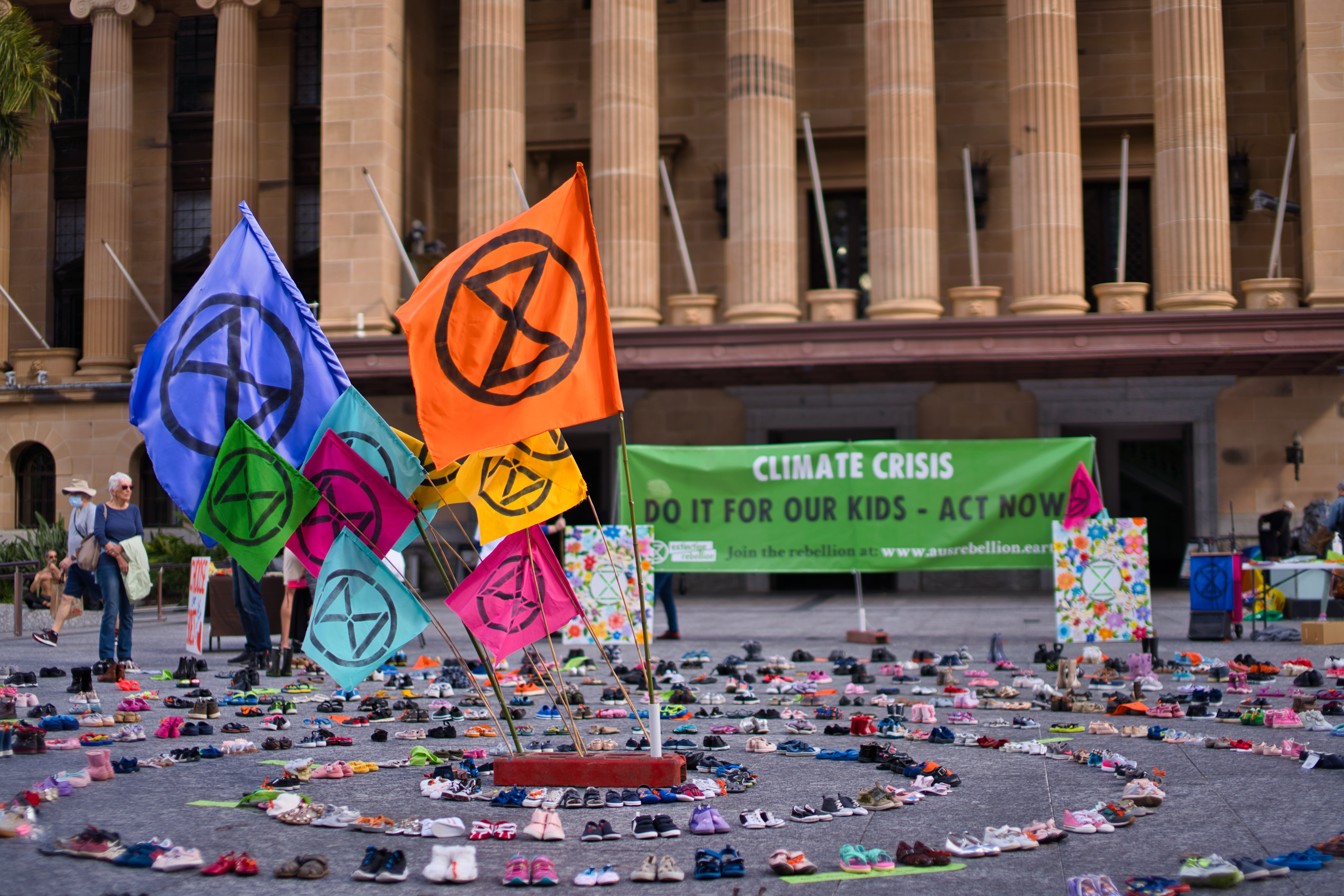
A protest in King George Square, Brisbane (2020)

Extinction Rebellion is a loosely networked, decentralised, grassroots movement, with largely autonomous local groups – which often collaborate on actions – forming the bulk of the movement's organisational capacity. A local group is generally based around a specific geographical locality such as a suburb, city or in some cases a larger region. The movement also organises around affinity groups.

Anyone who takes action in pursuit of "XR's three goals and adheres to its ten principles, which includes non-violence, can claim to do it in the name of XR."

The Economist identified the group as using the tenets of holacracy to operate more effectively given strong state opposition.

=== Organisation and roles ===
Extinction Rebellion has a decentralised structure. Provided that they respect the "principles and values", every local group can organise events and actions independently.

=== Wings ===
==== Doctors for XR ====
A group of health professionals named "Doctors for Extinction Rebellion" supports XR actions and organises demonstrations on their own, warning about the effects of climate change on human health. They are notably present in the United Kingdom and Switzerland.

==== XR Youth ====
A youth wing—XR Youth—of Extinction Rebellion had formed by July 2019. In contrast to the main XR, it is centered on consideration of the Global South and indigenous peoples, and more concerned with climate justice. By October 2019, there were 55 XR Youth groups in the UK and another 25 elsewhere. All XR Youth comprise people born after 1990, with an average age of 16, and have been as young as 10.

==== Christian Climate Action ====
Believing humans to be God's stewards of the earth, XR's Christian wing, the Christian Climate Action, has been involved in numerous direct action campaigns and other protests to bring awareness of climate change and the climate crisis. It has called for churches in the UK to help alleviate poverty and inequality caused by climate change and has also written to Justin Welby, the Archbishop of Canterbury, over the Church of England's lack of support for the group.

It has a membership of more than 1000 (with around 150 taking direct action), including retired Anglican priest Sue Parfitt. It is associated with Camino to Cop26, a women-run faith group that walked 500 miles to the COP26 conference in Glasgow to protest world leaders' lack of action on climate change. Other groups such as Marcha a Glasgow, the Pilgrimage for Cop26 and the Young Christian Climate Network also walked to the conference; they have described the journey as a pilgrimage.

== History ==
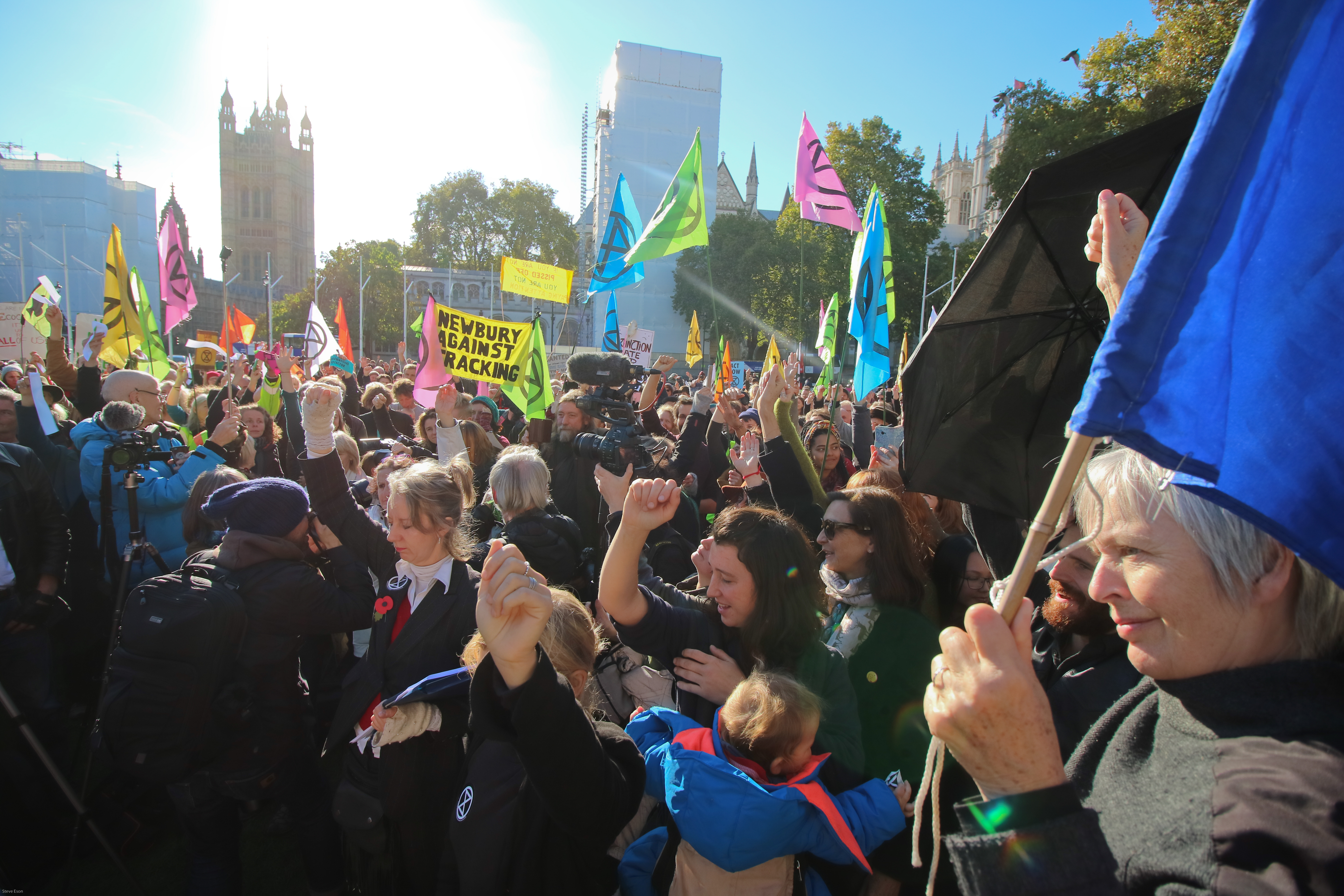
"Declaration of Rebellion" at Parliament Square, 2018

Extinction Rebellion originated in the United Kingdom at a meeting of activists including Gail Bradbrook, Roger Hallam and Simon Bramwell in April 2018, at which they drew up a number of goals. About one hundred academics signed a call to action in their support in October 2018, and XR was launched on 31 October by Hallam, Bradbrook, Simon Bramwell, and other activists from the campaign group Rising Up!

Grassroots movements such as those of Occupy, Gandhi's Satyagraha, the suffragettes, Gene Sharp, Martin Luther King Jr. and others in the civil rights movement have been cited as sources of inspiration In seeking to rally support worldwide around a common sense of urgency to tackle climate breakdown, reference is also made to Saul Alinsky. His "Pragmatic Primer", Rules for Radicals (1972), is seen as offering insights as to "how we mobilise to cope with emergency", and "strike a balance between disruption and creativity". Roger Hallam has been clear that the strategy of public disruption is "heavily influenced" by the community-organizing tactician: "The essential element here is disruption. Without disruption, no one is going to give you their eyeballs".

A number of activists in the movement accept arrest and imprisonment, similar to the mass arrest tactics of the Committee of 100 in 1961.

On 9 December 2018, a second open letter of support signed by another hundred academics was published.

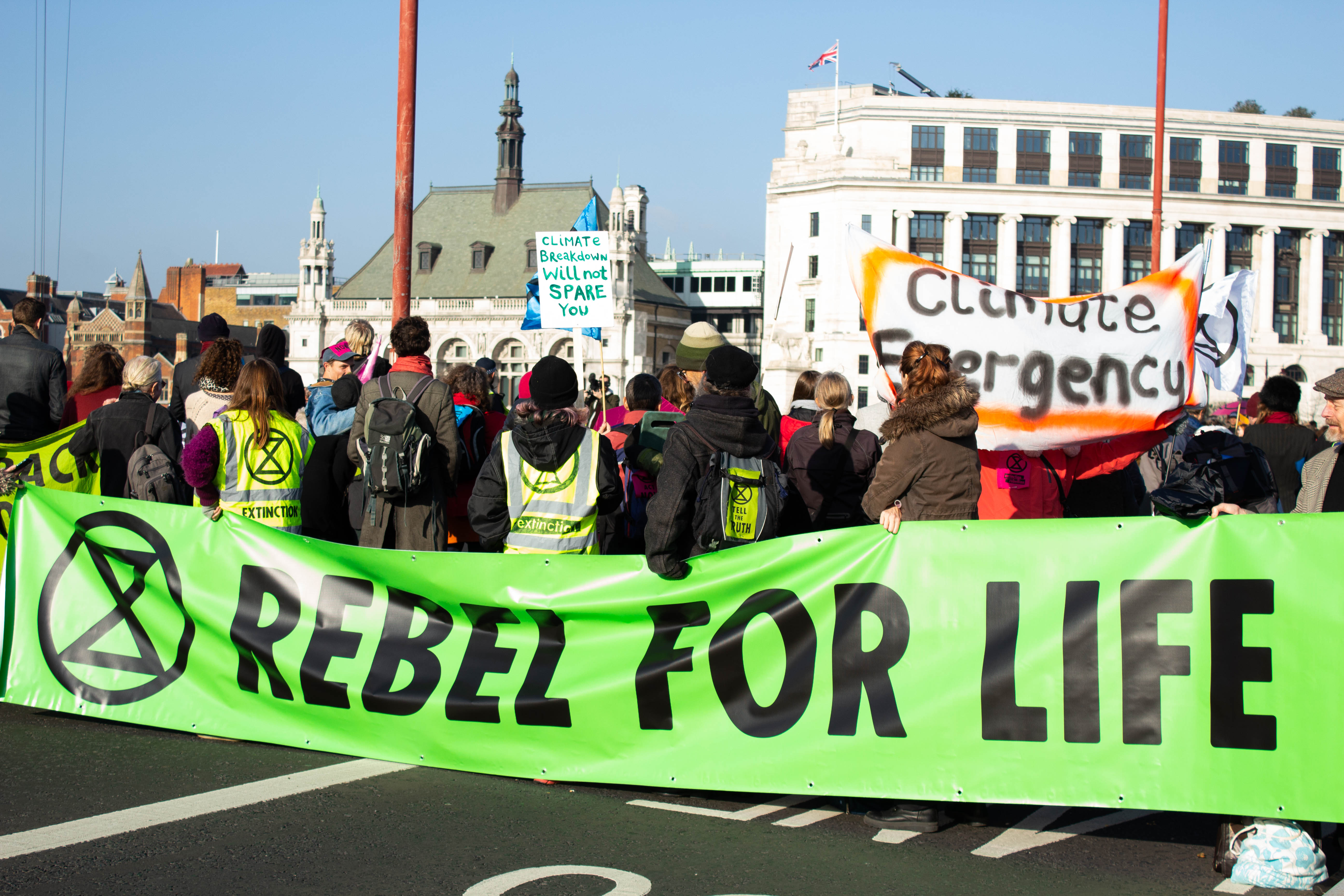
"Rebellion Day" on Blackfriars Bridge, 2018

Extinction Rebellion has taken a variety of actions since 2018 in the UK, United States, Australia and elsewhere.

On 5 October 2021, the group blocked streets in Zurich, Switzerland, demanding that the Swiss government take measures to address climate change in the country.

On 4 November 2021, Extinction Rebellion demonstrators blocked the Schlumberger Gould Research Centre in west Cambridge to oppose the research into fossil fuel extraction by an American corporation. The demonstration was scheduled to coincide with the COP26 climate summit in Glasgow, which is focusing on energy.

In April 2022, activists from Extinction Rebellion blocked key bridges across London, among them two Olympic athletes. Protestors had been arrested after climbing oil tankers, anchoring themselves to structures, or blocking roads at oil depots.

In June 2024, activists from Extinction Rebellion interrupted the PGA Tour's Travelers Championship in Cromwell, Connecticut, when they ran onto the golf course while play was taking place, spraying a green with orange powder.

In September 2024, activists from Extinction Rebellion chained themselves to the access gates of the Rijksmuseum in Amsterdam, forcing its closure. The activists said they would only leave if the museum cuts all ties with the ING bank.

In September 2024, activists from Extinction Rebellion covered the Finnish Parliament House in red paint, which according to testers, may not be able to be removed without damage. Extinction Rebellion is under threat of being classified as a criminal organization and abolished due to a Citizens' Initiative which received more than 70,000 signatures within a day, in response to which, a member of Extinction Rebellion made internal posts in which they fantasized about violence and the collapse of the government. These posts received support from some members, but were condemned by the organisation who states that they have cooperated with police to locate those responsible.

=== Offshoots: Insulate Britain and Just Stop Oil ===
In Britain in 2021, some campaigners considered that XR was being ignored by government (except for legislating against protests) and no longer had the effect needed to create real change, so other groups were formed with the idea of using mass disruption and arrest to draw attention to a very specific demand. Insulate Britain was set up to demand that the government implement measures to fit all homes with improved insulation by 2030 to improve energy efficiency thus reducing greenhouse gas emissions. Just Stop Oil from 2022 protested against fossil fuels. Both groups carried out disruptive protests, blocking traffic and seeking to be arrested.

== Arrest as a tactic ==
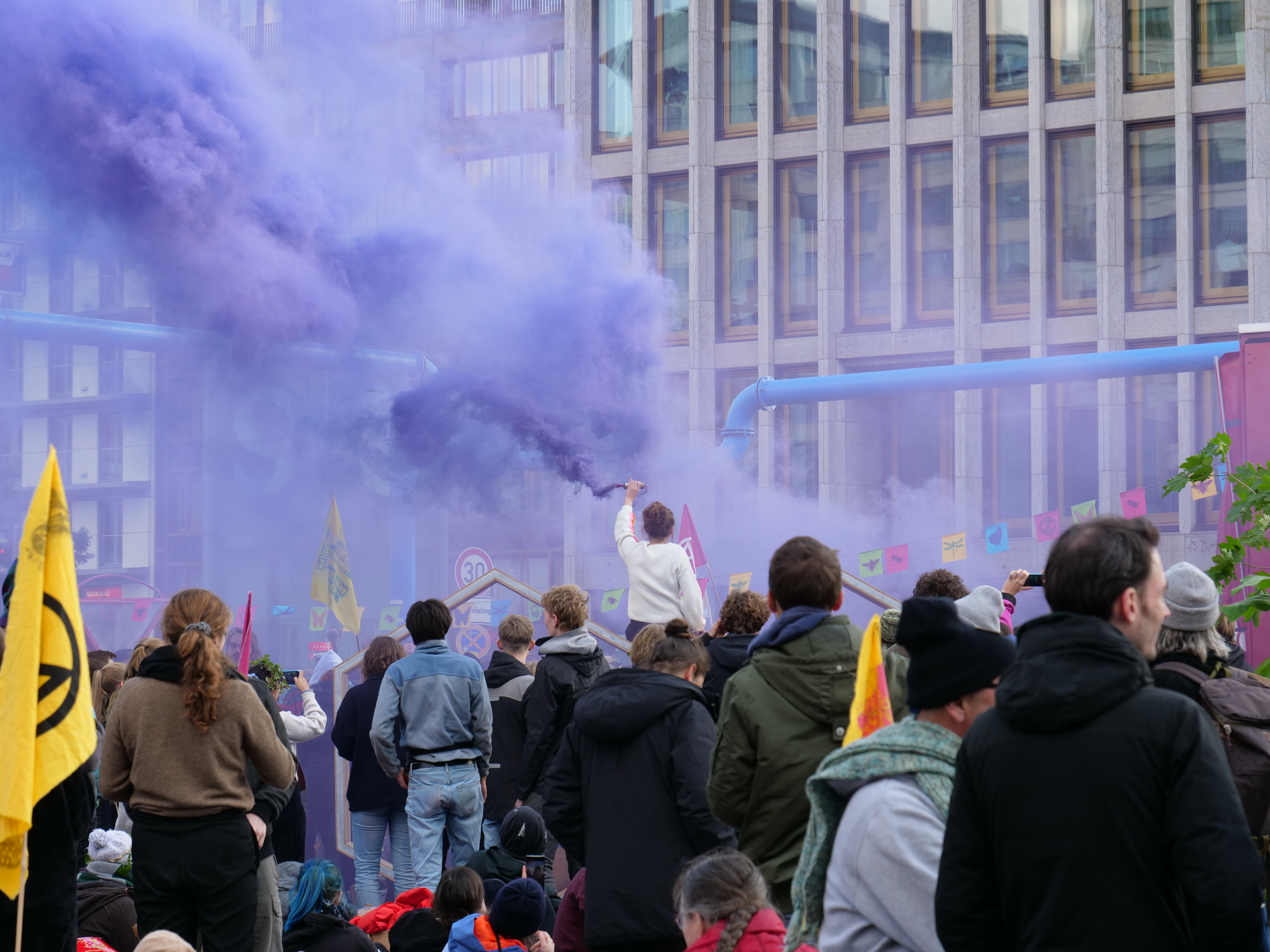
Street or building blockades are one way activists use to increase awareness.

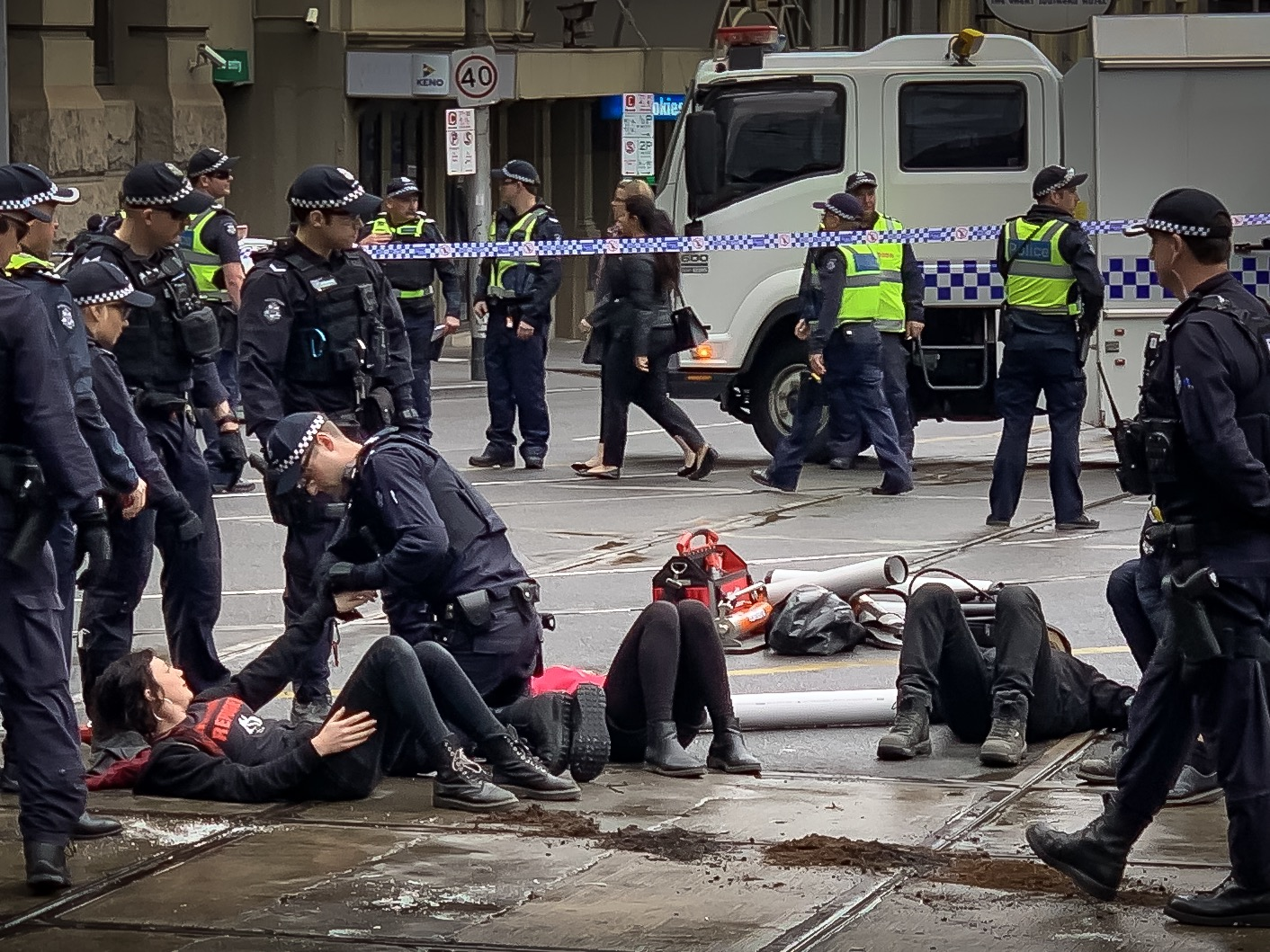
A law enforcement officer works to cut the chains off protesters that are chained to each other.

Extinction Rebellion uses mass arrest as a tactic to generate attention to their cause by wasting police time and disrupting others. Extinction Rebellion's founders researched the histories of "the suffragettes, the Indian salt marchers, the civil rights movement and the Polish and East German democracy movements", who all used the tactic, and are applying their lessons to the climate crisis. Co-founder Roger Hallam has said "letters, emailing, marches don't work. You need about 400 people to go to prison. About two to three thousand people to be arrested."

In April 2024, Hallam was given a suspended two year sentence for attempting to block Heathrow Airport with drones, and in July 2024 he was convicted of conspiracy to cause a public nuisance by blocking the M25 motorway and sentenced to five years' imprisonment.

In June and July 2019, some of the Extinction Rebellion supporters arrested that April appeared in court in the UK. On 25 June, a 68-year-old protester was convicted of breaching a section 14 order giving police the power to clear static protests from a specified area, and given a conditional discharge. On 12 April, more than 30 protesters appeared in court, each charged with being a public assembly participant failing to comply with a condition imposed by a senior police officer at various locations on various dates. Some pleaded guilty, and were mostly given conditional discharges. The trials of those who pleaded not guilty are to take place in September and October.

In London's April 2019 protests, there were 1130 arrests made, and during the two-week October 2019 actions in London as part of "International Rebellion", 1832 arrests were made. This included the Green Party Member of European Parliament for the West Midlands, Ellie Chowns, Green Party co-leader and Leader of the opposition on Lambeth Council, Jonathan Bartley, and future Green Party Leader Zack Polanski.

On 16 November 2023, a jury acquitted nine members of XR who together had caused £500,000 worth of criminal damage to the windows of the London headquarters of HSBC bank two years prior as a climate protest. The defendants did not dispute the facts of the case. The jury deliberated for just two hours before returning a verdict of not guilty.

== Support and funding ==
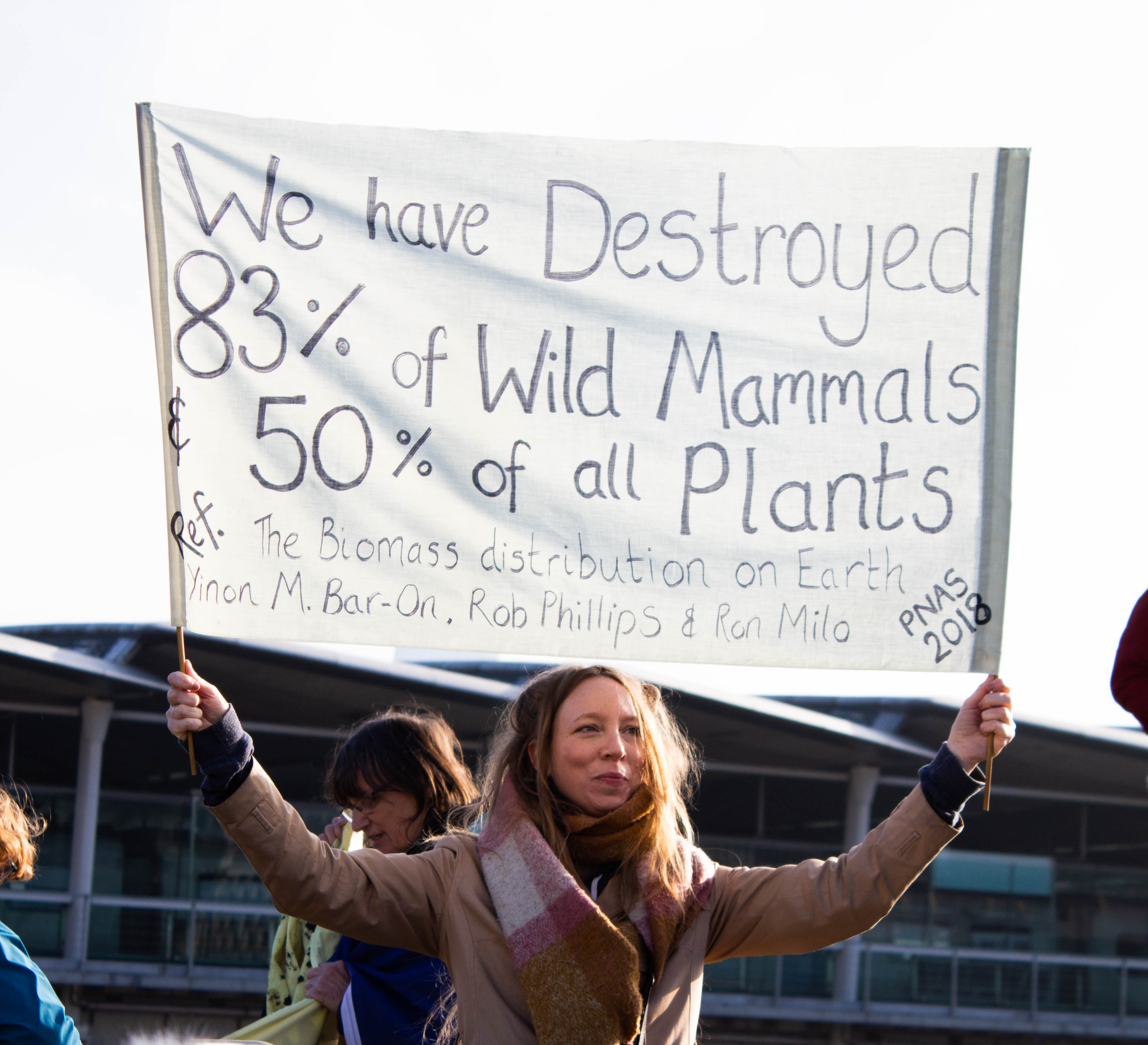
Environmental supporter at one of the events highlighting research published on biodiversity loss.

During the "International Rebellion", which started on 15 April 2019, actions and messages of support arrived from various sources, including a speech by actress Emma Thompson, a planned visit by school strike leader Greta Thunberg, and statements from former NASA scientist James Hansen and linguist and activist Noam Chomsky.

A study conducted during the first two days of the mid-April London occupation, polling 1539 participants, found that 46% of respondents supported the rebellion; however, an opinion poll of 3482 British adults in October 2019 found that support was lower and that 54% of respondents strongly or somewhat opposed actions aiming to "shut down London" The protests on 17 April had blocked access to means of transport including buses, alienating travellers.

In May 2019, Roger Hallam and eight others stood as candidates in the European Parliament elections in the London and the South West England constituencies as Climate Emergency Independents. Between them, they won 7,416 out of the 3,917,854 total votes cast in the two constituencies.

In June 2019, 1,000 healthcare professionals in the UK and elsewhere, including professors, public health figures, and former presidents of royal colleges, called for widespread non-violent civil disobedience in response to "woefully inadequate" government policies on the unfolding ecological emergency. They called on politicians and the news media to face the facts of the unfolding ecological emergency and take action. They supported the school strike movement and Extinction Rebellion.

In July 2019, Trevor Neilson, Rory Kennedy and Aileen Getty launched the Climate Emergency Fund (CEF), inspired by Greta Thunberg and Extinction Rebellion protesters in the UK in April. It donated almost half a million pounds to Extinction Rebellion groups in New York City and Los Angeles and school strike for climate groups in the US. In September 2019 Getty pledged $600,000 (£487,000) to the Fund.

Christopher Hohn gave £50,000 to the group and the charity he co-founded, The Children's Investment Fund Foundation (TCI), has donated more than £150,000. As of January 2022, TCI was the single biggest individual donor to Extinction Rebellion. In 2019, TCI said that none of its money was spent on civil disobedience.

In October 2019, the Financial Times wrote that Extinction Rebellion's total fundraising was "just over £2.5m in the past 12 months."

Michael Stipe is a supporter, with all profits from his debut solo single "Your Capricious Soul" going to Extinction Rebellion.

On 6 February 2020, the environmental organization Mobilize Earth debuted Guardians of Life, the first of twelve short films that highlight the most pressing issues facing humanity and the natural world. Funds raised by the project went to Amazon Watch and Extinction Rebellion.

In September 2021, YouGov asked 3,296 British adults for their opinions on Extinction Rebellion, of which 19% were "fairly positive" or "very positive", and 49% were "very negative" or "fairly negative".

The XR UK web site list the terms of service are under "Extinction Rebellion UK (Compassionate Revolution Ltd)". Compassionate Revolution Ltd is a subsidiary of Climate Emergency Action Limited, and serves XR UK.

In February 2026, the New York Times reported that FBI agents recently had been visiting Extinction Rebellion activists in the United States, apparently as part of a federal investigation into climate change activism.

== Criticism ==
=== Timescale ===
According to the Energy and Climate Intelligence Unit, the time frame being urged by XR is "an ambition that technically, economically and politically has absolutely no chance of being fulfilled." Due to the inaction of governments in the past, it would be difficult to achieve net zero in such a short time frame. It said that one way to go net zero by 2025. Such action would have the scrapping of flying and the removal 38 million petrol and diesel cars from the roads. Twenty-six million gas boilers would have also had to be disconnected in six years to meet their target. The Rapid Transition Alliance and the Centre for Alternative Technology are more positive about the date specified.

=== Politics and ideology ===
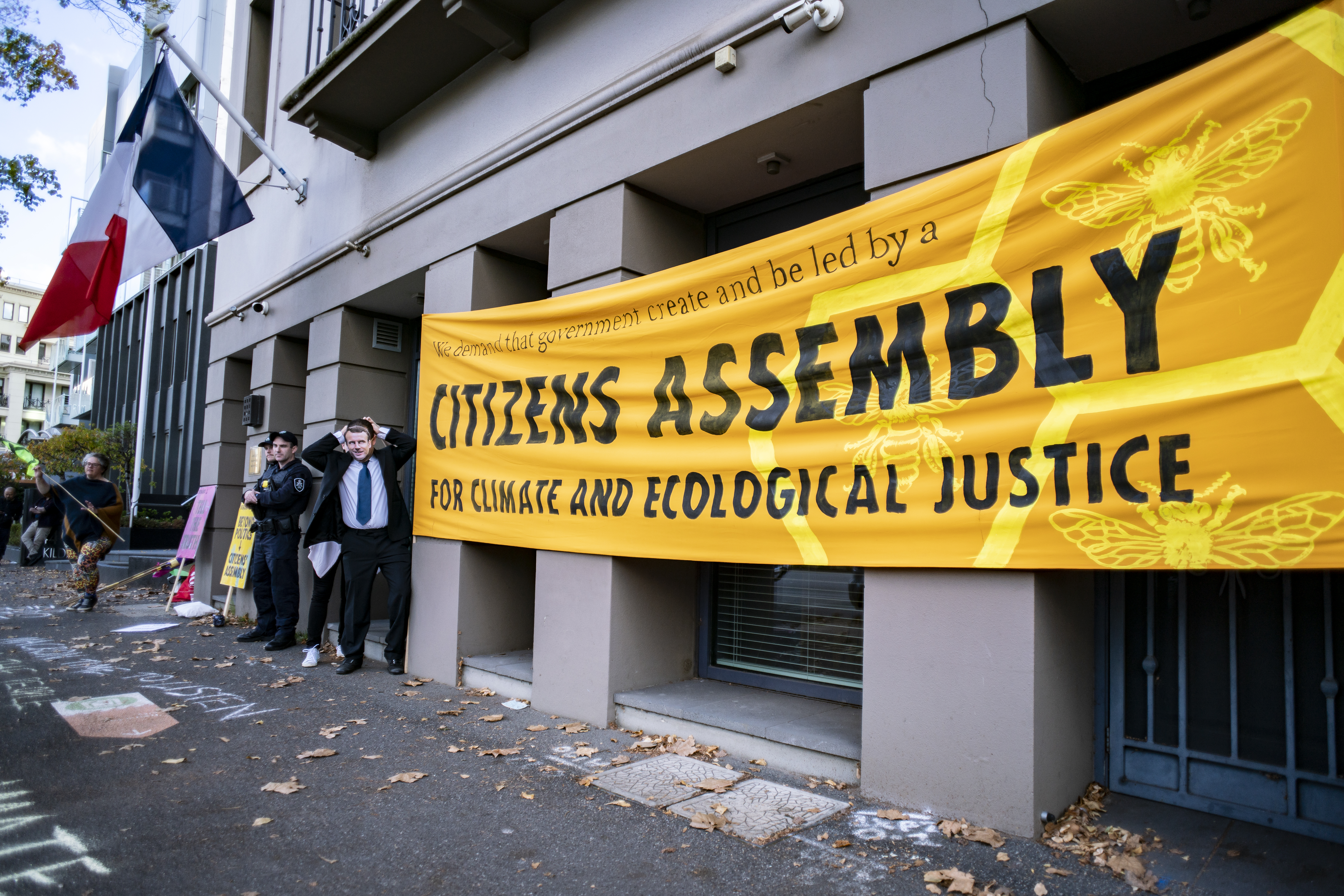
Extinction Rebellion Solidarity with the French Citizens' Assembly on Climate

Former spokesperson Zion Lights later became a critic of Extinction Rebellion, arguing that they often emphasise symbolic or system-change-oriented proposals rather than practical measures to reduce emissions. She stated that discussions on energy policy within Extinction Rebellion are sometimes dismissed as irrelevant unless they involve broader systemic change, while she has argued for prioritising the rapid deployment of affordable, clean energy.

Extinction Rebellion's third demand ("Government must create and be led by the decisions of a Citizens' Assembly on climate and ecological justice") has been summarised by its leadership as a demand to "go beyond politics". This demand has been criticised by socialists, including individuals who have participated in the movement's action. Writing for The Independent in April 2019, Natasha Josette, an anti-racist activist and member of Labour for a Green New Deal, critiqued Extinction Rebellion both for marginalising ethnic minorities and for not recognising that "the climate crisis is the result of neoliberal capitalism, and a global system of extraction, dispossession and oppression".

Also writing for The Independent, Amardeep Dhillon argued that XR's narrow focus on net zero carbon emissions meant that it ignored extractivism and the threat to the environment posed by companies in the extractive sector using greenwashing to defend and advance their economic interests, suggesting that XR's position "threatens to give carte blanche to governments and corporations who are happy to shift the burden of climate destruction onto poor and indigenous communities of colour in the global South".

In October 2019, Erica Eisen, an XR participant, wrote an article for Current Affairs in which she linked the movement's "beyond politics" slogan not only to the demand for a citizens' assembly but also to a refusal to take stances on issues beyond the environment, in order to gain as broad a base of support as possible, highlighting the movement's ban on organising community groups based on political identity. She argued that "our current economic system is [not] compatible with continued life on this planet. It is unrealistic and irresponsible to pretend that a proposed climate solution which keeps capitalism intact is any kind of solution at all." In her view, failing to articulate an anti-capitalist position undermined the movement's credibility by "lend[ing] tacit support" to large companies responsible for environmentally destructive behaviour. She also suggested that failing to embrace leftist positions would give space for far right groups to piggyback and exploit environmentalist rhetoric, citing the examples of the Christchurch mosque shootings and 2019 El Paso shooting, both of whose perpetrators left manifestos which mentioned environmental concerns.

Writing for i-D in December 2019, Nathalie Olah drew parallels between XR and earlier decentralised protest movements such as the events of May 68 in France and the Occupy movement, suggesting that a shared lack of clarity in concrete demands had stunted the political impact of the latter two movements and arguing that climate change and class politics were "inextricable" as "a small minority are responsible for a high proportion of emissions, and because the poorest stand to face the worst repercussions".

=== Diversity ===
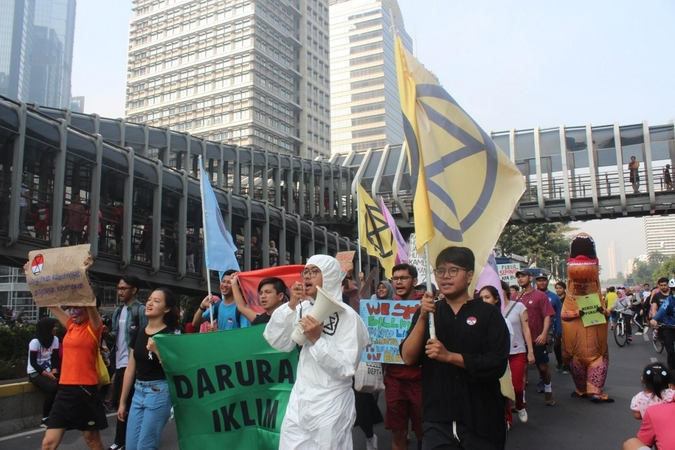
Event in Jakarta, Indonesia, just one of the many countries represented by the organization.

Ben Smoke, one of the Stansted 15, writing in The Guardian, criticised XR's tactic of mass arrest. He wrote for XR to casually speak of imprisonment undermines the negative experiences of incarceration on Black, Asian and minority ethnic people in the UK. He also wrote that for XR to be supporting peoples' court cases risks drawing significant "resources, time, money and energy" from the environmental movement, from the individuals involved, and which could otherwise be directed towards people most affected by climate change. Smoke instead recommended tactics that are not only the preserve of those able to afford the expense and time of arrest. He also wrote that though mass arrests may be intended to cause government to focus more on tackling climate change, it might instead cause government to increase anti-protest legislation.

The critique of XR's middle class white privilege, that its mass arrest tactic does not consider that people of colour will not be treated as leniently by the system as white people, was also highlighted in an open letter from Wretched of the Earth, an environmental group that focuses on black, brown and indigenous voices, to XR.

Some in Extinction Rebellion have also called attention to Martin Luther King Jr. (one of XR's guiding inspirations) in this regard, noting that his call for civil disobedience to end segregation was a call directed toward all who were willing and able, regardless of race or colour.

When the movement expanded to the US, a fourth demand was added to that group's list of demands: for a "just transition that prioritises the most vulnerable and indigenous sovereignty [and] establishes reparations and remediation led by and for black people, indigenous people, people of colour and poor communities for years of environmental injustice."

=== Class ===
Karen Bell, senior lecturer in human geography and environmental justice at the University of West of England, Bristol, wrote in The Guardian that environmental groups such as Extinction Rebellion are not strongly rooted in working-class organisations and communities, which she said is a problem because building the broad-based support necessary for a radical transition to sustainability requires contributions from all strands of environmentalism, especially working class. Labour Party shadow cabinet member Lisa Nandy criticised the organisation in The Guardian in October 2019, saying "calls for individual action can't just be modelled on the lifestyles of middle class city dwellers".

George Monbiot has also written in The Guardian that "Extinction Rebellion is too white, and too middle class." The Canning Town protest, in which two activists scaled a train at Canning Town station, then kicked working class commuters who attempted to remove them from the train before being dragged onto the platform and mobbed, focused attention on class issues and led to an apology from an XR spokesman.

=== Alleged extremism ===
A report called "Extremism Rebellion" by Policy Exchange, a UK-based conservative think tank, said that Extinction Rebellion is an extremist organisation seeking the breakdown of liberal democracy and the rule of law. It called for the criminalisation of the group's strategies, and the Police, Crime, Sentencing and Courts Act 2022 took recommendations directly from Policy Exchange's 2019 report. The think tank received in 2017 a $30,000 donation by US-based oil and gas corporation ExxonMobil, to target Extinction Rebellion.

In 2019, the South East Counter Terrorism Unit police authority listed Extinction Rebellion, alongside neo-Nazi and Islamist terrorist groups, as a threat in a guide titled "Safeguarding young people and adults from ideological extremism". After media inquiries, they recalled and disavowed this guide, saying the presence of Extinction Rebellion was an error. Priti Patel, who advocated for the aforementioned policing bill, defended the decision to designate Extinction Rebellion as an extremist group after the guide was disavowed.

In 2023, BBC News reported that climate activists were being referred to the Prevent strategy, a counterterrorism scheme aimed at identifying extremists who may become violent. Between 2015 and 2022, 32 individuals had been referred to Prevent for "Left Wing - Environmental" reasons, and a 2019 spike in reports was associated with the rise of Extinction Rebellion. The Prevent strategy, in general and in its specific use against environmental activists, has been criticised as having a chilling effect on freedom of expression.

=== Cult allegations ===
Extinction Rebellion has been accused of being a cult by the media, environmental activists as well as several former senior XR members. Sherrie Yeomans, coordinator of XR blockades in the English city of Bristol accused the group of being a manipulative cult and former XR spokeswoman Zion Lights accused Roger Hallam of creating a cult by fear-mongering such as when he forced her to claim that 6 billion would die by the end of the century due to climate change and further claimed that he compared himself to a prophet. Hallam had compared climate change to the Holocaust and claimed that the climate crisis would lead to mass rape and has called for the overthrow of governments even if it results in deaths resulting in him being accused of fostering a death cult. German former Green Party politician Jutta Ditfurth accused it of being a doomsday cult with members blindly following esoteric gurus.

== Media coverage ==
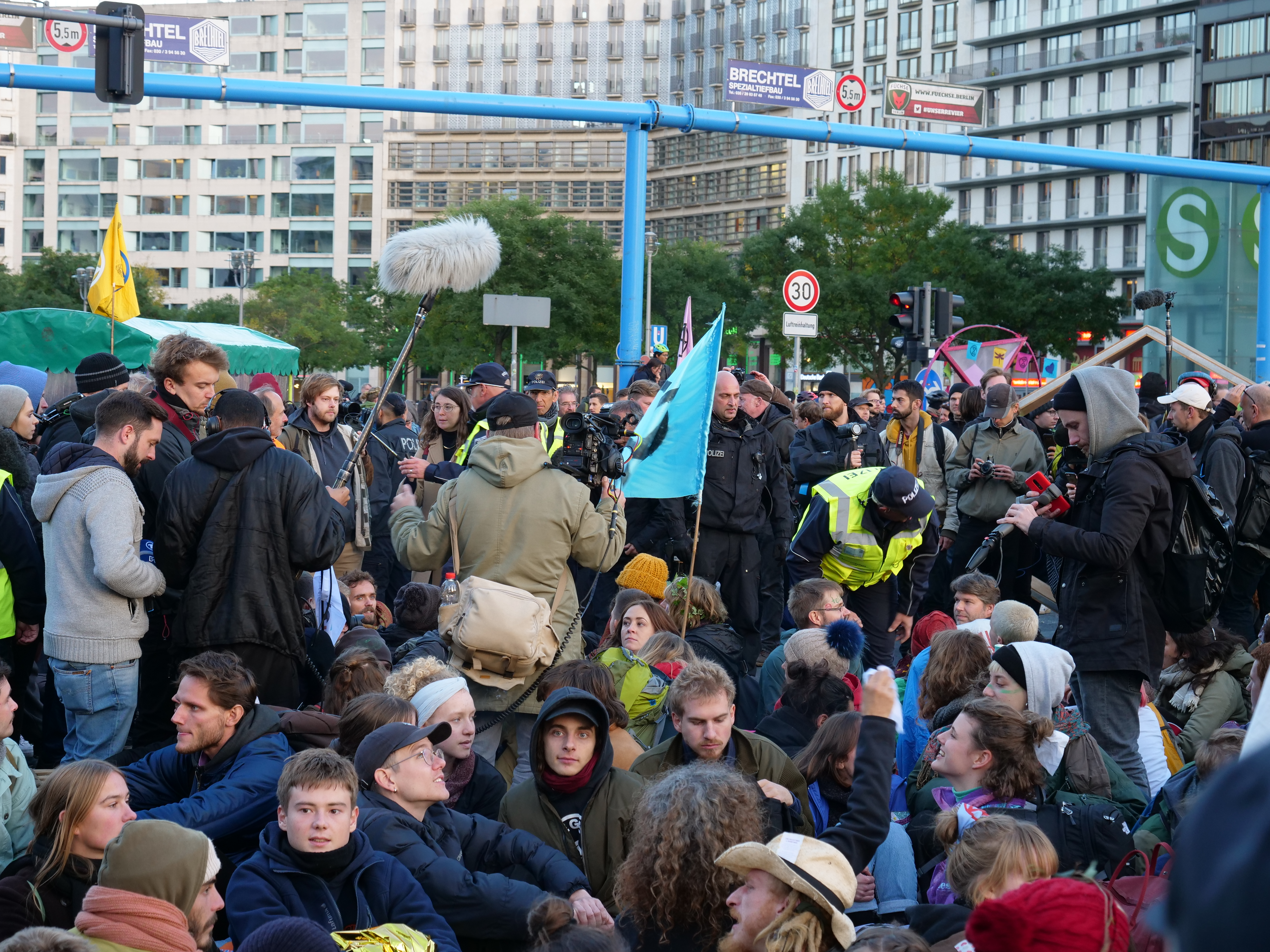
Large events draw the attention of media.

Analysis of the October 2019 "International Rebellion" indicates that "the movement was mentioned more than 70,000 times in online media reports. Of these, 43.5% of online coverage was in the UK followed by 15.2% from Germany, 14.6% in Australia and 12.1% in the US."

In 2021, a documentary entitled Rebellion was released to UK Netflix and other streaming services across the globe. The documentary looks behind the scenes of XR and the creators.

Dávid Szőke and Sándor Kiss in Film International expressed criticism of the short films Extinction (2019) and Guardians of Life (2020), stating, "It is no doubt that film is one of the most meaningful ways of facilitating changes in our world. While Extinction and Guardians of Life declare 'nonviolent open rebellion' and the urge to action for the survival of our natural world, the divergence between their stated ideals and their disruptive tactics in shaping public understanding of climate-related issues point toward starkly opposite directions. Despite their alleged advocacy of environmental issues, the involvement of such movie stars as Emma Thompson or Joaquin Phoenix redirects attention to their celebrity status, eclipsing the focus on the ecological solutions they should represent. Thus, these films can be viewed as nothing more than glossy facades, effectively disguising the radical environmental actions of XR activists under a more inclusive, media-friendly veneer."

== Bibliography ==
=== Publications ===
- This Is Not a Drill: An Extinction Rebellion Handbook. London: Penguin, 2019. ISBN 978-0-14-199144-3.
- Our Fight. By Juliana Muniz Westcott. 2019. ISBN 978-1-79325-836-6.
- The Hourglass. Issue 1. September 2019. Newspaper. Edited by Zion Lights. 110,000 copies were printed.
- The Hourglass. Issue 2. October 2019. Newspaper. Edited by Zion Lights.

=== Films ===
- Conscientious protectors: a story of rebellion against extinction. Full‑length documentary. London release 25 July 2022.
- My extinction. A personal film by Josh Appignanesi, released 30 June 2023, on his experiences becoming active, including with XR.

== See also ==
- Climate movement
- Ende Gelände
- Environmental direct action in the United Kingdom
- Global Climate March
- Individual action on climate change
- People's Climate March
- School Strike for Climate
- Scientist Rebellion
- Sunrise Movement
- The Climate Mobilization
- World Scientists' Warning to Humanity
- 3.5% rule
