= Impossible Rebellion =

2021 climate change protests

- Part of the Extinction Rebellion protests
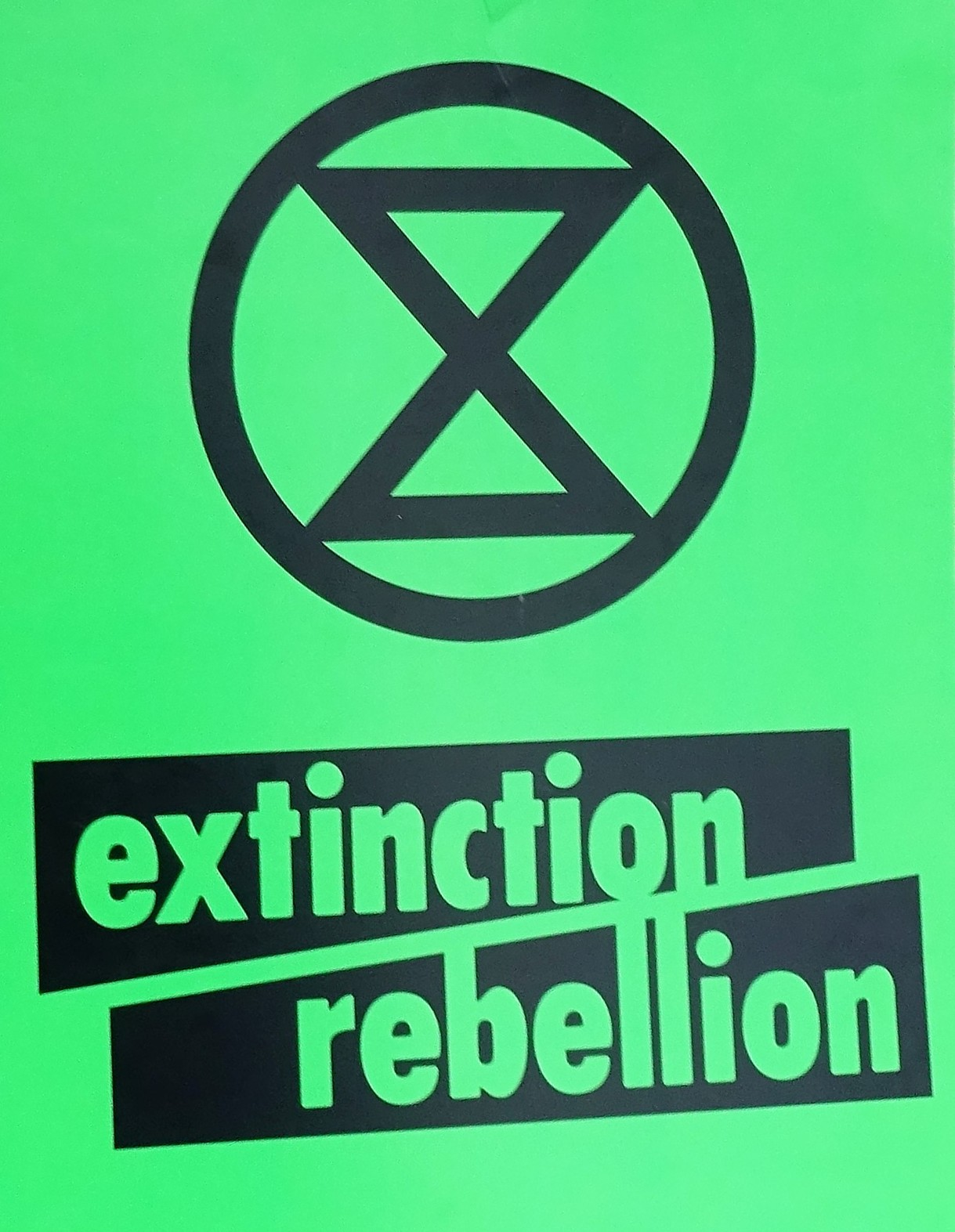
- An Extinction Rebellion placard
- Date: 23 August 2021–4 September 2021
- Location: City of London
- Goals: Ending future fossil fuel investments; Declaring a climate emergency; Net zero by 2025; Citizens' assemblies on climate change
- Methods: Nonviolent civil disobedience

Impossible Rebellion was a series of nonviolent climate change protests in the United Kingdom organised by Extinction Rebellion (XR), from 23 August 2021 to 4 September 2021. The protests particularly targeted the City of London to raise awareness of the role of the financial sector in climate change. Protesters during the Impossible Rebellion demanded that the UK government cease new investments in the fossil fuel industry. XR also demand that the government declare a climate emergency, reach net zero carbon emissions by 2025 and create a citizens' assembly on climate change.

The Impossible Rebellion was the fifth major set of XR protests; activists are focusing on short-term protests in highly visited areas rather than taking hold of smaller numbers of area, as in previous actions. Demonstrations variously focused on banks' continued investment in fossil fuels, new road and rail infrastructure such as HS2, the deforestation of the Amazon rainforest, treatment of animals on Crown Estate land and the fashion and fast food industry. Some days of protest have been themed around highlighting women and indigenous voices. Sister groups involved in protests include Animal Rebellion and Money Rebellion.

== Background ==
Extinction Rebellion (XR) are a climate justice movement with three major demands to the UK government: declare a climate emergency; achieve carbon neutrality by 2025; and create a citizens' assembly on climate change. For the Impossible Rebellion, which ran from 23 August 2021 to 4 September 2021, the movement also demanded that the government cease new fossil fuel investments.

The fortnight-long Impossible Rebellion was the fifth major set of XR protests, following its 10-day September 2020 Autumn Rebellion. The protests came in the wake of the IPCC Sixth Assessment Report, which found that a tipping point in the climate system may have already been exceeded by carbon dioxide emissions. A co-founder stated that XR experienced increasing donations following the report's publishing, and that they raised over £100,000 in 24 hours shortly before the beginning of the Impossible Rebellion.

== Tactics by protesters and police ==
Extinction Rebellion use nonviolent civil disobedience such as marches, protests, disruption to public transport and people deliberately being arrested, to achieve their goals. According to the Evening Standard, around 2,000 volunteers worked for XR on art action design, including banners, flags, costumes, sculptures and other design work. Art co-ordinators create some costumes, such as the "red rebels", and issue instructions to other XR chapters on how to replicate the artwork. The UK arts factory co-ordinator stated that creating banners and flags required 16-hour working days for a month from 100 volunteers, and that they aimed to upcycle and reuse as many materials as possible. The demonstrations involved drumming and chanting, and human barriers to cause road closures.

A June 2021 Supreme Court ruling—nicknamed the "Ziegler judgment"—found that obstructing a highway during a protest could be lawful, but the deputy assistant commissioner of the Metropolitan Police commented that "officers are still able to take action if they see wilful obstruction". Prior to the protests, XR sent a letter to the Metropolitan Police commissioner Cressida Dick inquiring how the police would act in light of the ruling.

The Guardian reported that tactics of both protesters and police changed for the Impossible Rebellion. XR aimed to create short-term protests in different highly visited areas of London, rather than controlling a small number of sites. Telegram communications announced protest locations to activists each morning, depriving police of advanced notice. Meanwhile, police learned that blocking access to protests only increased disruption, and tried to surround protest infrastructure and then physically remove protesters. The newspaper described protests as smaller than previous XR rebellions, and the police as quickly disrupting protests, focusing on dispersing musicians first to dampen the atmosphere or surrounding installations so that removal teams could operate. An XR police liaison suggested that police aimed to minimise the opportunity for the public to see the protests and beginning interacting with them, and said that activists were injured by the speedy and forceful interventions.

The Guardian and XR spokespeople described an increase in police violence on 31 August 2021 in response to the protests, including hitting protesters with batons, holding them in headlocks while punching them and shattering glass nearby to people. A politician for the Green Party of England and Wales, Caroline Russell, said that she had seen videos of "completely unacceptable" police behaviour during the protests. The human rights advocacy group Liberty expressed concerns that police used live facial recognition at the protests, which the police denied.

== Protests ==
External videos
- "Demand the Impossible"; Extinction Rebellion video released in advance of the protests

At the Impossible Rebellion, the first week—themed "crisis talks"—was intended to target busy areas of London, for protesters to occupy and talk to the general public. In the second week, disrupting the financial industry in the City of London was the focus. The Olympic sailor Laura Baldwin was a spokesperson for the group, while the actor Jerome Flynn said the protests were "more urgent than ever". By Wednesday, the BBC reported that turnout was in excess of 10,000. 367 activists were arrested during the first week of the protests. By Wednesday of the second week, the figure stood at 480; police had removed around 80 protesters glued to structures and 50 locked onto them.

The day before official protests began, three demonstrators sprayed paint at the Guildhall School of Music and Drama in protest of the City of London Corporation and held a banner reading "co-liberation freedom together". Jerome Flynn was in attendance among around 200 people.

=== First week ===
Protests on the Sunday of the first week of the Impossible Rebellion

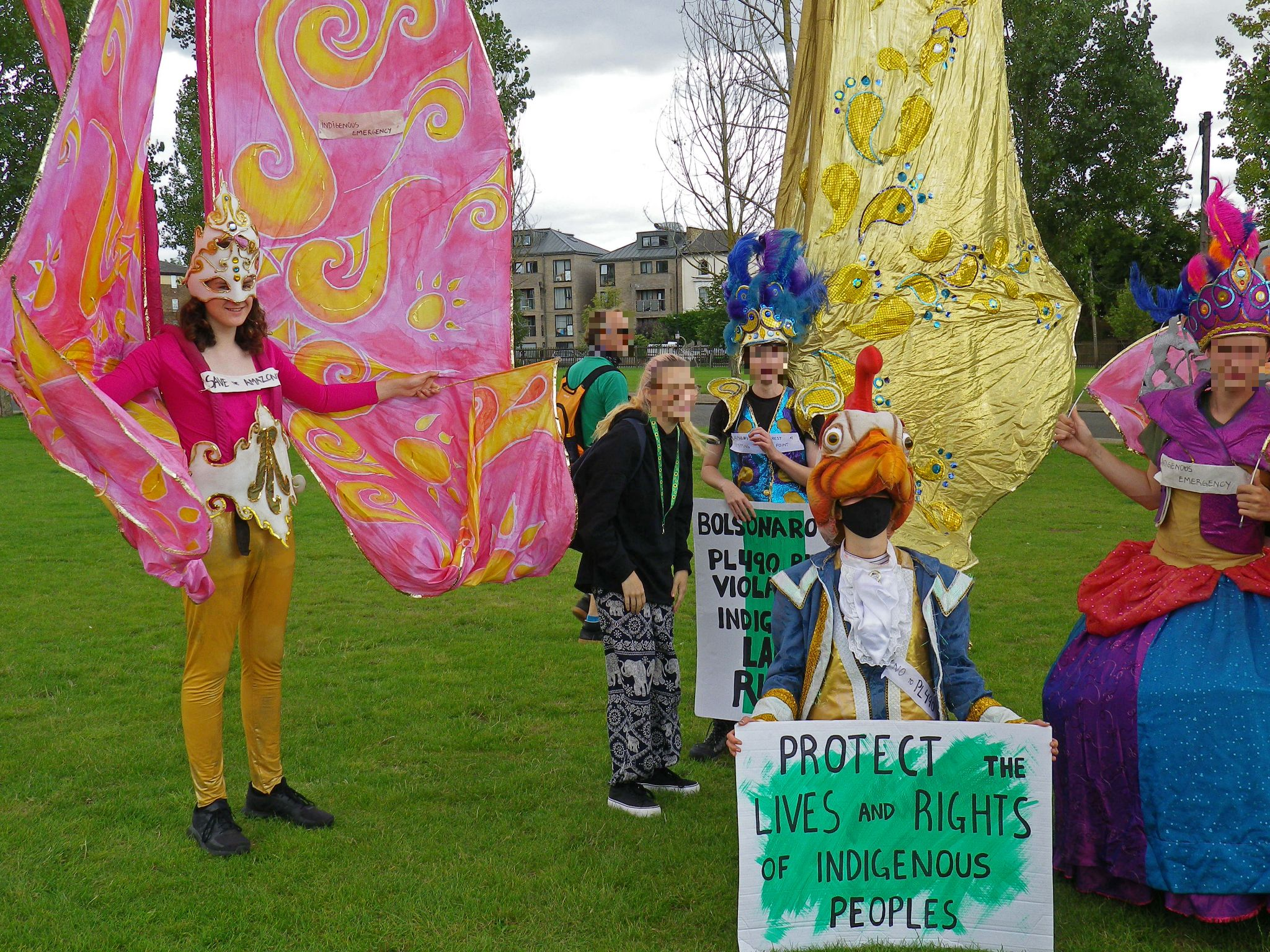

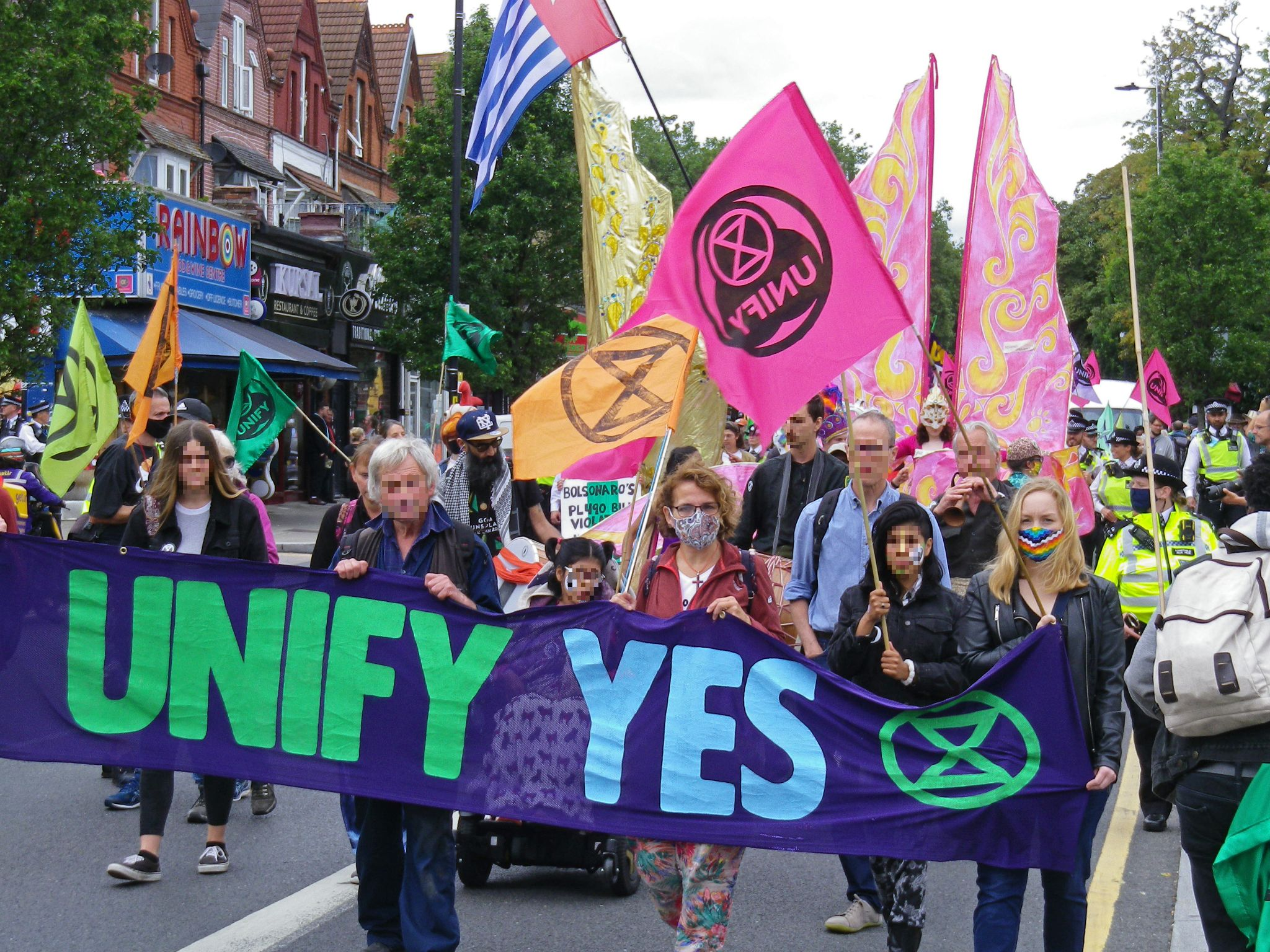

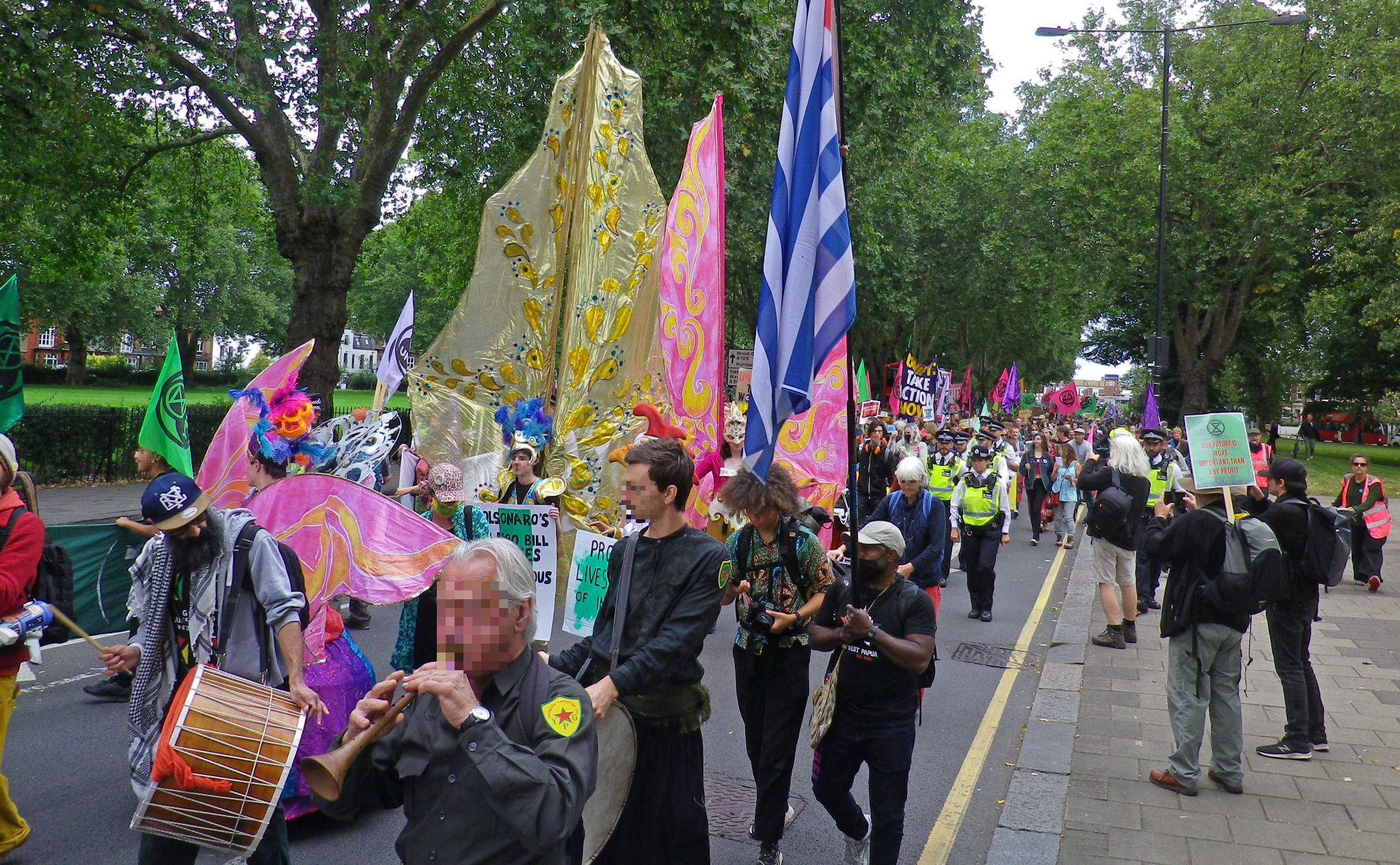

The two weeks of protests began in Trafalgar Square on Monday 23 August 2021 at 10 a.m., with a speech from Esther Stanford-Xosei followed by a march to a junction in Covent Garden. Around midday, a 4-metre-tall (13 ft) pink table, augmented with a sound system and displaying the phrase "come to the table – change is now", was placed there as an invitation for the public to join protests and a demand for the creation of citizens' assemblies. The van that delivered the table was parked and six activists tied themselves to it. The table was dismantled by police on Tuesday morning. At 7 p.m., the police imposed a dispersal order under section 14 of the Public Order Act 1986 to limit the protest. The Guardian reported that protester numbers appeared to be fewer than in previous rebellions.

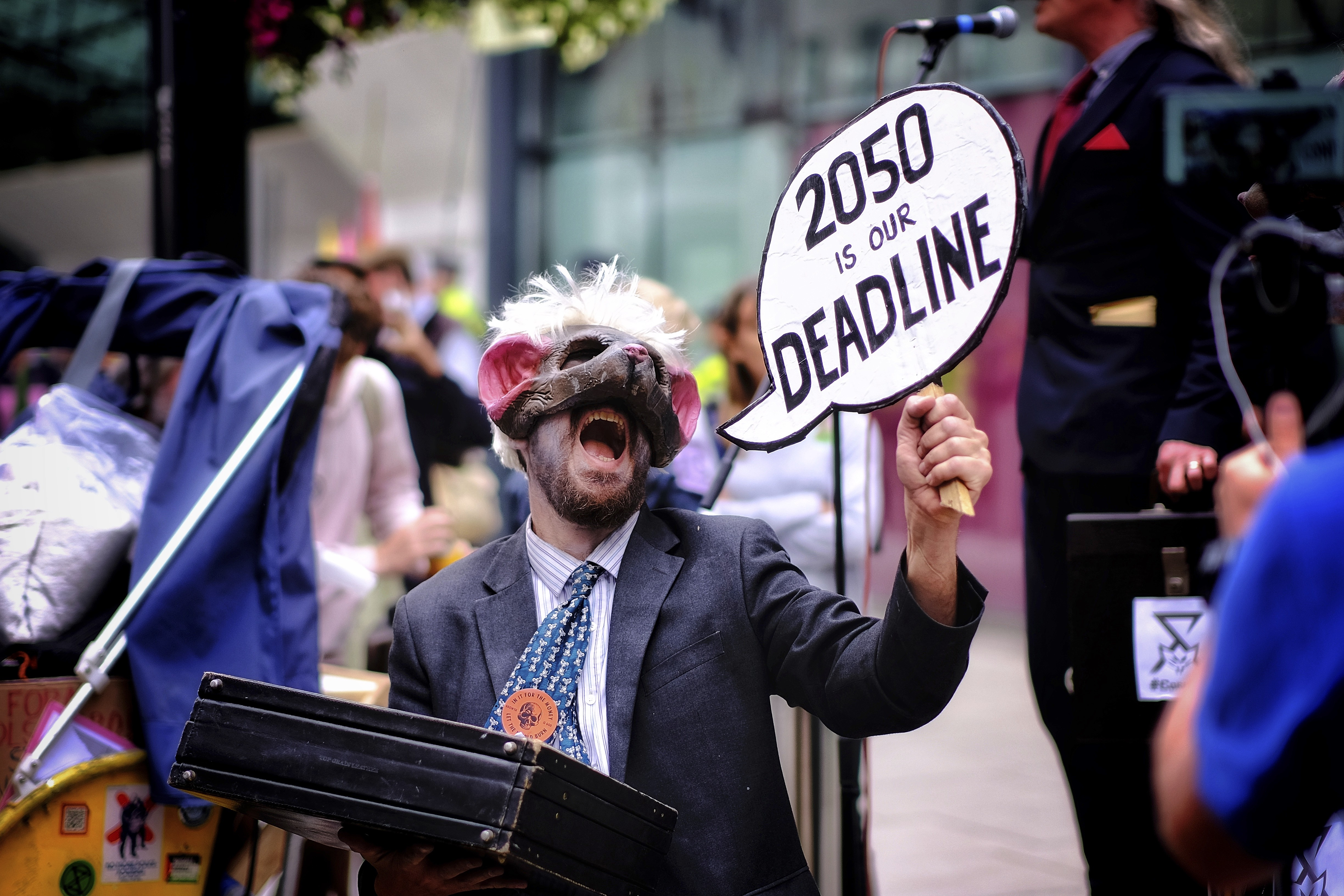
An activist protests against the lateness of the UK government's 2050 deadline to reach net zero carbon emissions.

Protesters built a camp in Cambridge Circus on Tuesday, while in Westminster, XR Cymru organised a "die-in" protest to outline ways in which climate change kills people. Additionally, protesters dressed as window cleaners and scrubbed the entrance to HM Revenue and Customs in protest at their connections to Barclays and its fossil fuel involvement. An Oxford Street protest targeted Selfridges, due to the environmental cost of the fashion industry. Elsewhere in the city, a van bearing a protester with a "stop HS2" flag was parked and activists locked themselves onto it. A dispersal order went into place at 6:15 p.m. and an overnight protest by Animal Rebellion, a sister group to XR, took the form of overnight occupation of a McDonald's in Leicester Square, where police arrested 36 people.

The next day, protests included a FINT (female, intersex, non-binary and trans) themed protest at a status of Anteros in Piccadilly Circus, a protest against deforestation of the Amazon rainforest and the subsequent displacement of indigenous peoples, outside the Brazilian Embassy, and a mock award ceremony by Money Rebellion for the Department for International Trade for "making an outstandingly awful contribution to climate change". Construction of a second pink table in Oxford Circus, of 2.5 m in height, was interrupted by police before its completion, but some activists glued themselves to it and formed a human chain around it to prevent removal. At 4 p.m., after issuing of a public order act, police made a samba band leave the area.

On Thursday 26 August, Animal Rebellion protested at Victoria Memorial by putting red dye in the fountain and holding placards reading "a royal blood bath", to raise awareness of Crown Estate land that is used for hunting and factory farming. A sit-in at the Department for Business, Energy and Industrial Strategy protested against new fossil fuel investments. XR Roads Rebellion protested against road building projects like HS2.

Friday saw a Blood Money march themed around banking, with protesters dressed as bankers with bloody hands or suffragettes. Standard Chartered, the London Stock Exchange and Guildhall were covered in fake blood, representing those of slaves and others. XR speakers said that Standard Chartered had invested £23 billion in fossil fuels since the 2015 Paris Agreement. The Guardian reported that Friday saw the Impossible Rebellion's largest turnout to date, with several thousand participants.

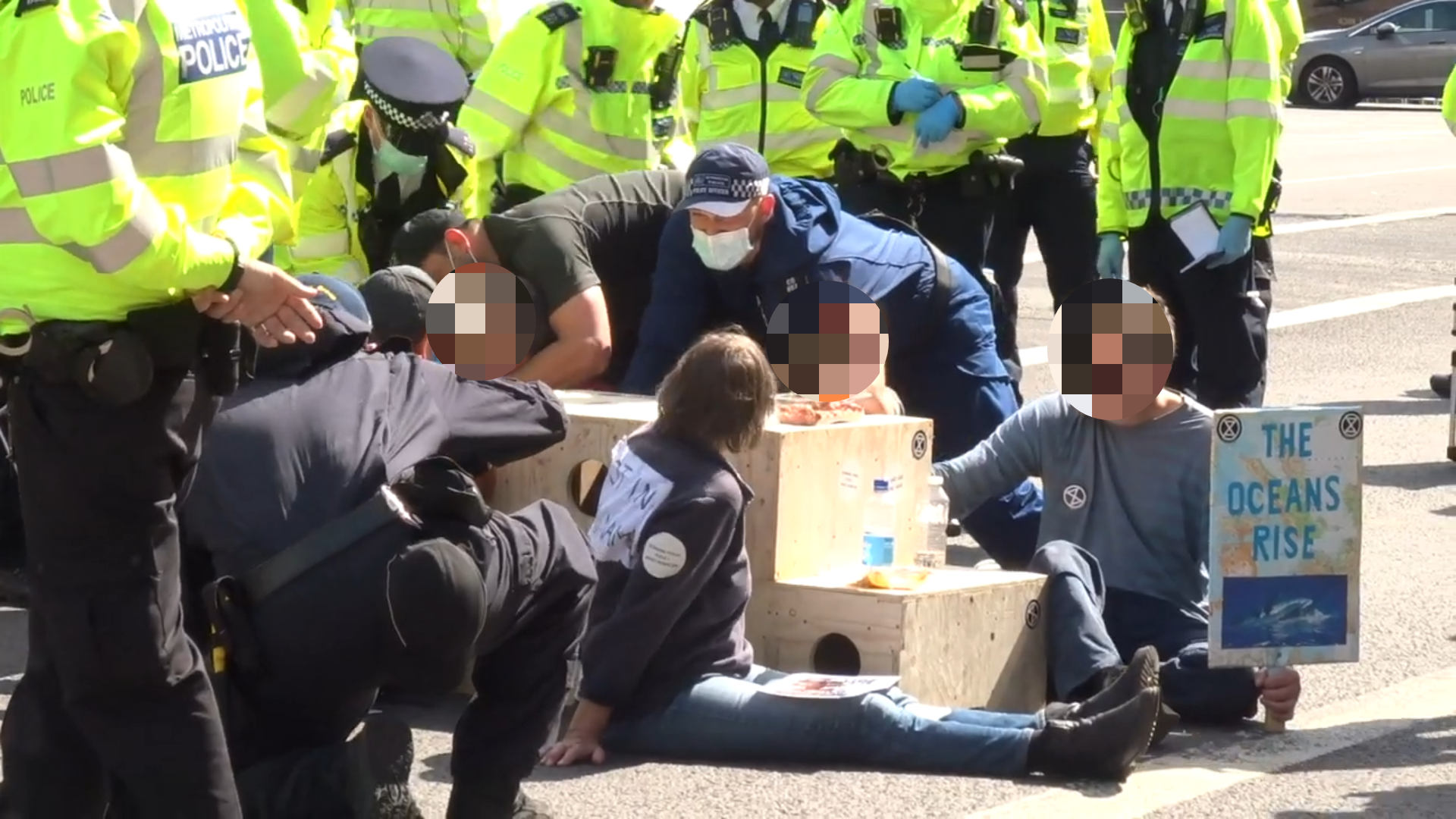
Police attempt to remove protesters from a wooden structure they are attached to.

Around 500 people, according to Sky News, attended a Saturday march beginning at Smithfield Market to oppose meat consumption, including for its impact on climate change, and the breeding of animals specifically for animal testing. The offices of Unilever and Cargill were protested outside, due to Unilever's dairy and palm oil usage and Cargill's meat processing. A sit-in outside the Marine Stewardship Council buildings paid tribute to aquatic animals in captivity.

On Sunday night, silent protests and die-ins at the Science Museum were followed by 200 activists entering the museum, with 11 of them gluing or locking themselves to railings inside. The group included scientists and a 12-foot dodo prop, in opposition of petrol, diesel and fossil fuel investment—the museum accepted donations from the fossil fuel company Royal Dutch Shell for an exhibit that was running at the time, Our Future Planet. The museum said that they had "facilitated a peaceful protest ... ensuring the health and safety of everyone in the building". A blockade took place outside, by the adjacent Natural History Museum. A conservation scientist member of Scientists for Extinction Rebellion commented that Shell's sponsorship "allows them to paint themselves as part of the solution to climate change, whereas they are, of course, at the heart of the problem". Police denied protesters's accusations of kettling.

=== Second week ===
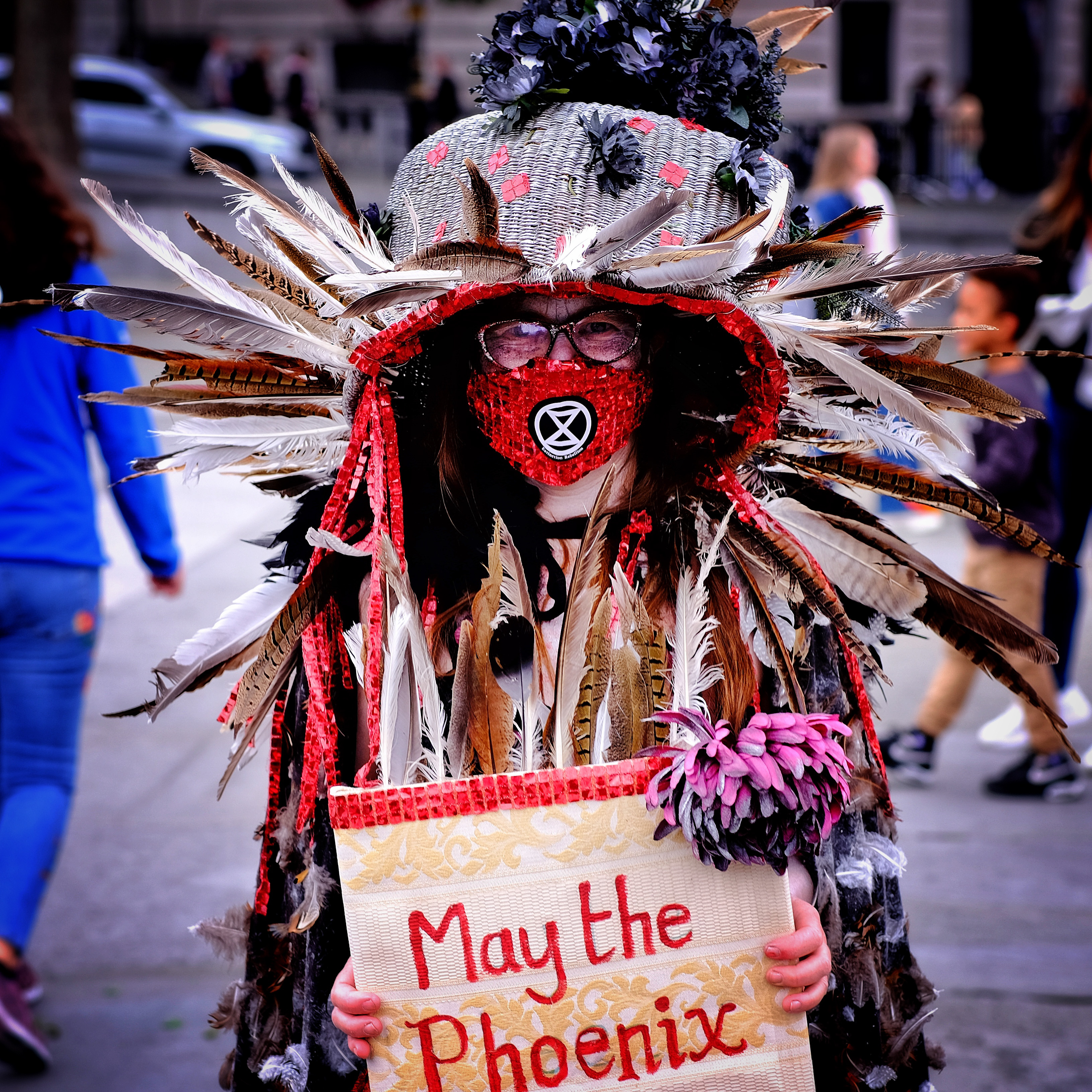
A protester on the second Friday of the protests

Access to Tower Bridge was prevented by protesters with a caravan on Monday. Those sat on the caravan held a pink sign with a heart symbol. This followed a larger protest by XR in the area. The police used batons and physical force to remove activists. The following day, London Bridge was blocked with a bus in a protest that Olympic canoeist Etienne Stott joined; he was carried away by police officers after refusing to move. Beginning at Parliament Square and ending at Downing Street, demonstrators held prop prams with messages opposing the UK government's environmental policies, while XR Families met at St Paul's Cathedral and demonstrators outside the Bank of England highlighted a Unicef report on the impact of climate change on children.

Meanwhile, on Tuesday, the largest dairy distribution centre in the UK—Arla's factory near Aylesbury—was disrupted by Animal Rebellion activists who erected wooden structures blocking the entrance and exit of the building, preventing access by large vehicles and lead to road closures. A police process removal team tried to remove around 50 protesters who had arrived from 5 a.m. and locked themselves to factory structures, while others erected tents around the area and lay in the middle of the road. Animal Rebellion said that the building processes 10% of the UK's milk supply; they demanded that Arla switch to plant-based foods by 2025.

Also on Tuesday, around a dozen activists associated with XR Youth Solidarity and WTF WWF occupied the headquarters of the conservation group World Wide Fund for Nature (WWF), in protest against its actions towards indigenous communities in Africa who describe the WWF as evicting and persecuting them. The occupations continued overnight.

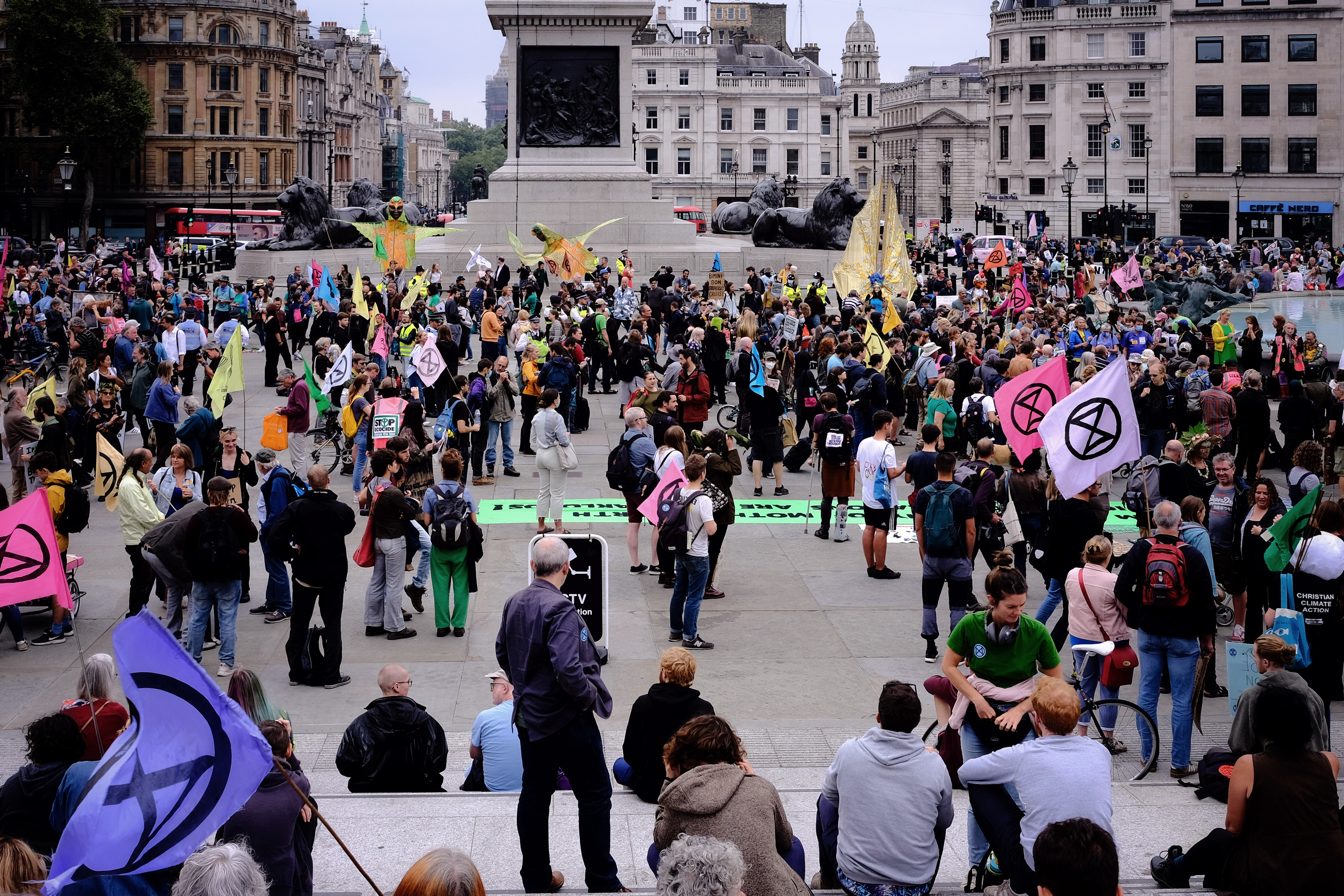
Protesters in Trafalgar Square

The following day, an anti-greenwashing demonstration at Parliament Square drew several hundred participants, and eight women activists broke panes of glass at JPMorgan Chase offices, while a heavy police presence deterred "swarm" protests elsewhere in London.

On Thursday, a protest at the Bank of England was joined by members of XR who said that they were breaking bail conditions by entering the financial district of the City of London, including Etienne Stott. With the sister group HS2 Rebellion, two activists scaled the insurance company Marsh's offices, in opposition to their insurance of HS2 subcontractors. An employee for Marsh came out to speak to demonstrators.

A Friday die-in at JPMorgan Chase headquarters was attended by 60 doctors and medical professionals, under the organisation of Doctors for Extinction Rebellion. While "code red" was sprayed on the building, a letter was delivered to CEO Jamie Dimon urging the investment bank to divest from fossil fuels, move away from an emission intensity target to an absolute target and make pledges in line with a 2021 International Energy Agency report. The group quoted a report by Rainforest Action Network describing JPMorgan's actions as "flatly insufficient".

== Reaction ==
According to The Daily Telegraph, some business owners in the area of protests criticised that Impossible Rebellion could impact their income. Architects' Journal reported that a number of architects attended the protest, including those from the sustainability group within Child Graddon Lewis, while an Architects Climate Action Network initiative implemented by companies like Studio Bark gave staff paid leave to protest if they chose.

Julian Jessop of The Daily Telegraph opposed the protests, saying that voting was the "legitimate means" to enact change, that "disruption to the lives of ordinary Londoners risks undermining any public support" for climate change mitigation. Jessop opposed XR's aims, saying that "an immediate halt to fossil fuel investment would do far more harm than good" and that "the environment is safest in the hands of capitalist economies". Writing in the same publication, Ross Clark criticised XR co-founder Gail Bradbrook for driving a diesel car, saying that she was a "prize hypocrite" and that "it isn't alright [for her] to drive a diesel car, nor indeed any car" while demanding net zero carbon emissions by 2025 and engaging in protests that cause road closures. Bradbrook said that she participated in ridesharing but could not take her children to sports events on Sundays as the buses do not run in her area. The Independent's Niko Vorobyov argued that accusations of hypocrisy are "a lazy way to delegitimise the movement without addressing its actual concerns", as it is "very difficult to live in the modern world" without having a negative environmental impact and because the majority of carbon emissions (71%) come from 100 companies.

James Dyke of i believed that "profound feelings of love" is what was compelling "otherwise mild-mannered people" to "deliberately break the law", saying that the Impossible Rebellion is "important" to "help communicate the scale of the changes required".
