= Mobilize Earth =

Ecology non-profit organization

- Formation: 22 January 2020; 6 years ago
- Founded at: Edgewater, New Jersey
- Type: Domestic not-for-profit corporation
- Registration no.: DOS ID 5693599
- Purpose: Climate change mitigation Nature conservation Environmental protection Fundraising
- Region served: International
- Services: Advocacy group, filmmaking
- Parent organization: Project Earth 2025, Inc.
- Website: mobilize.earth

Mobilize Earth is the public name of Project Earth 2025, Inc., a US environmental and nonprofit corporation. It aims to raise awareness, demand action, and "mitigate the climate and ecological emergency by bringing together people from all walks of life".

The project was publicly launched on 6 February 2020 with the release of Guardians of Life, the first of twelve short films highlighting the most pressing issues facing humanity and the natural world. Directed by Shaun Monson, Guardians of Life stars Joker actor Joaquin Phoenix, Sin City actor Rosario Dawson, and Full Metal Jacket actor Matthew Modine.

Proceeds raised through the project will go to Amazon Watch, a California-based organization dedicated to protecting the Amazon rainforest, and the environmental activist group, Extinction Rebellion.

== Aims and objectives ==
Mobilize Earth's stated objectives are:

- To create and support captivating, awareness raising campaigns, speaking the truth on climate and ecological breakdown.
- To support individuals, organizations, and industries to shift to circular and regenerative systems.
- To work directly with organizations and individuals on the frontline of the climate crisis.
- To identify and develop the best ideas to mitigate and adapt to the urgent needs of our planet's changing climate and ecosystems.
- To support the practice of deep democracy across difference, grounded in relational practices, and local civic and environmental action.

== Films ==
=== Guardians of Life ===
The three-minute-long film Guardians of Life is set in a well-equipped modern operating theater where a surgeon and other medical staff are struggling to revive a dying patient. The patient's heart stops beating and with the team in agreement, they abandon their attempts, take off their face masks, and the surgeon declares the time of death. One of the nurses (Q'orianka Kilcher), however, who has traditional indigenous makeup under her face mask, begins old-fashioned, low-tech, manual CPR and succeeds in resuscitating the patient. Finally the patient, hidden from the camera until now, is revealed to be the planet Earth – its continents ablaze with fire and clearly in a critical state.

== See also ==
- 2019–20 Australian bushfire season
- Deforestation of the Amazon rainforest
