= People's Climate March =

People's Climate March may refer to:

- 2014 People's Climate March, an activist event in New York City and elsewhere
- 2017 People's Climate March, a protest in Washington, D.C., and elsewhere

== See also ==
- Global Climate March, 2015
- List of environmental protests
