= Wretched of the Earth =

UK activist group

- Formation: 2015; 11 years ago
- Founded at: United Kingdom
- Type: Coalition
- Purpose: Climate change mitigation Migrant Justice

Wretched of the Earth is a coalition of climate justice groups led by Indigenous people and people of colour based in the United Kingdom, representing the interests of the Global South and people of color in response to climate change. The organisation's name is based on Frantz Fanon's book on anti-colonial theory, The Wretched of the Earth. The group seeks to challenge environmental organisations by asking groups like Extinction Rebellion to think critically about class, capitalism, and use of activist tactics that draw risk to people of color.

== Activist work ==
The organisation's demands include universal health care, the right to free education, corporate accountability, and demilitarization. Coalition members include Black Lives Matter UK, Migrants Rights Network, Peoples Climate Network, Algeria Solidarity Campaign, Argentina Solidarity Campaign, Black Dissidents, Colombia Solidarity Campaign, Environmental Justice North Africa, Global Afrikan People’s Parliament, Global Justice Forum, Indigenous Environmental Network, Kilombo U.K, London Mexico Solidarity, Movimiento Ecuador Reino Unido (MERU), Movimiento Jaguar Despierto, PARCOE, The London Latinxs, South Asia Solidarity Group, Science for the People, and This Changes Everything UK.

In 2015, Wretched of the Earth was removed from its previously designated position at the front of London's People’s Climate March of Justice and Jobs by organisers of the event March organisers saw the group's focus on anti-imperialism as too political. The group responded with an open letter to the group's organisers expressing hurt that they were made to remove signs stating that ‘British Imperialism causes climate injustice’.The open letter highlighted the repetition of colonialism in suppressing indigenous and people of color voices.

Wretched of the Earth issued an open letter in May 2019 asking Extinction Rebellion to reconsider strategies that would be harmful to black, brown, and indigenous activists and to rethink the way its activist tactics build on white privilege. This open letter posits that efforts to combat climate change will be meaningless unless they include and build on the experiences of people of color. Taking a decolonial perspective on climate justice, the organization states that environmental issues described as a current climate crises date back to 1492, when European settlers landed in the Americas.

The collective took part in a September 2019 march as part of the Global Climate Strike, calling for use of indigenous knowledge and experience in fighting climate change, and making a case for aligning the migrant justice movement with the climate justice movement.

== Political objectives ==
The group's concrete political demands include: "implementing a just transition, holding corporations accountable, ending militarism, definancializing nature, replacing borders with radical hospitality, and guaranteeing universal health care, free education, healthy food, and adequate income for all". In a publicised message of solidarity with the Black Lives Matter movement in 2020, the group aligned itself with political objectives such as defunding the police in favour of investing in community-led solutions and banning polluting industries. The group argues that "the Global North must pay its fair share of ecological and climate debt to keep below the 1.5 degree guardrail" including "a massive transfer in technology for climate adaptation". The group also argues for an external debt jubilee.

== Anti-imperialism and anti-racism ==
The group says that “[t]he climate movement will be decolonial or it will be nothing”. Representatives of Wretched of the Earth argue that dominant climate-focused strategies in countries like Britain fail to take into account the impacts of imperialism and colonialism on the current climate crisis, and the responsibilities that colonising countries therefore bear for the effects of climate change. In relation to existing political strategies to tackle climate change, they argue that a "greener economy in the UK will achieve very little if the government continues to hinder countries in the Global South from doing the same through crippling debt, unfair trade deals, and the export of its own deathly extractive industries." The group argues that the objective of environmental regeneration cannot be decoupled from the extractive politics leading to environmental degradation.

The group draws philosophical as well as historical connections between the logics of imperialism and colonialism and ecological breakdown. In an open letter from 2020, they state: "The same European colonialism that colonised and plundered entire nations through the logic of white supremacy, was the same project that sought to control and exploit nature. This is the origin of the ecological collapse we are witnessing today." Group members explain that while climate change is perceived in Western discourse as part of a projected future, climate injustice is in fact already occurring and impacting communities in the Global South and marginalised communities in the Global North, citing examples such as Cyclone Idai, Typhoon Haiyan, and Hurricane Katrina. The group identifies issues of environmental racism that are intertwined with the climate crisis, including the idea that "those least responsible for causing the climate crisis are usually the most vulnerable to its effects, including displacement."

They also argue that many mainstream climate agendas deprioritise the lives and livelihoods and communities of colour.

The group penned a statement of solidarity with the Black Lives Matter movement in June, 2020, stating: "We are indebted to the beliefs, visions and actions of people like Claudia Jones, Angela Davis, Audre Lorde, Berta Cáceres, Franz Fanon and many others."

== Migrant justice ==
The group draws significant connections between migrant justice and climate justice. In a speech delivered in London in September, 2019, the group stated: "There can be no climate justice without migrant justice. The UK and other countries in the Global North must also acknowledge their historic and current responsibilities for driving the displacement of peoples and communities—and honour its obligation to them. That means ending the hostile environment of walls and fences, detention centres and prisons that are used against racialised, migrant, and refugee communities." The group argues that the climate justice movement should ensure that migration is an inherent right rather than something people are compelled to do as a result of droughts, floods, and tornados that the victims of these disasters "had no role in creating". One of the group's key demands, outlined in an open letter published in Red Pepper in May, 2019, was the ending of the UK's hostile environment "of walls and fences, detention centers and prisons" that the group argues "are used against racialised, migrant, and refugee communities".
