= Leila Salazar-Lopez =

Leila Salazar-López
- Education: University of California, Santa Barbara
- Occupation: Environmentalist
- Known for: Executive Director of Amazon Watch

Leila Salazar-López has served as the executive director of the non-profit Amazon Watch since 2015. As Amazon Watch's Executive Director, Salazar-López leads the organization in its efforts to protect and defend the bio-cultural and climate integrity of the Amazon rainforest by partnering with indigenous peoples to protect their rights and territories.

Salazar-López has also led Amazon Watch in cooperation with organizations like Greenpeace, 350, Sierra Club, Rainforest Action Network, and more, in efforts to ensure corporate accountability, respect for indigenous rights, and the preservation of the Amazon ecosystem. Salazar-López appeared as a guest on the broadcast, 24 Hours of Climate Reality, part of the Climate Reality Project, where she discussed the importance of protecting the Amazon region.

== Biography ==
Salazar-López graduated from the University of California, Santa Barbara in 1998 with a Bachelor of Arts in Environmental Studies and Political Science. She has worked in the field of human rights and climate change for over twenty years as a grassroots organizer and international advocacy director for Amazon Watch, Rainforest Action Network, Global Exchange, and Green Corps.

Salazar-López resides in San Francisco with her family. She identifies as Chicana-Latina and is an advocate for environmental protection, indigenous rights, and climate justice, with a specific focus on the Amazon.

== Publications ==
Salazar-López has written and contributed to a variety of articles including;

- China's Other Big Export Product: Pollution co-authored with Paulina Garzón, published in the New York Times, 21/7/2017
- What China and California have in common – the Amazon? Published in The Mercury News, 06/13/2017
- ‘The Amazon is Life:’ Q&A with Sheyla Juruna, Indigenous woman warrior from the Brazilian Amazon Published in Earth Island Journal, 10/12/2011
