= Hourglass (newspaper) =

Free monthly British newspaper, published by Extinction Rebellion

- Founded: September 2019; 6 years ago
- Language: English
- Website: hourglass.news
- Free online archives: Yes

The Hourglass was a free monthly British newspaper, published by Extinction Rebellion (XR). It was launched in September 2019, with the strap-line "Rigorous Journalism for Fragile Times". 110,000 copies were printed of its first edition, and 143,000 of the second. The April and May 2020 issues were produced only in electronic format, following the COVID-19 lockdown, after which the paper ceased publication.

It was edited by environmental activist Zion Lights and included interviews with Margaret Atwood, Amanda Palmer and Neil Gaiman, Ray Mears, Michael Eavis, Christiana Figueres, Tom Rivett-Carnac, Maxine Peake, and Kevin Anderson. XR spokesperson Rupert Read was a regular columnist for the paper.

Former child actor Raphaël Coleman, later known as Iggy Fox, also wrote an exclusive article for the paper (which was reprinted on XR's website as "This is why I rebel" after Fox's death).
