= Amazon Watch =

US-based nonprofit organization

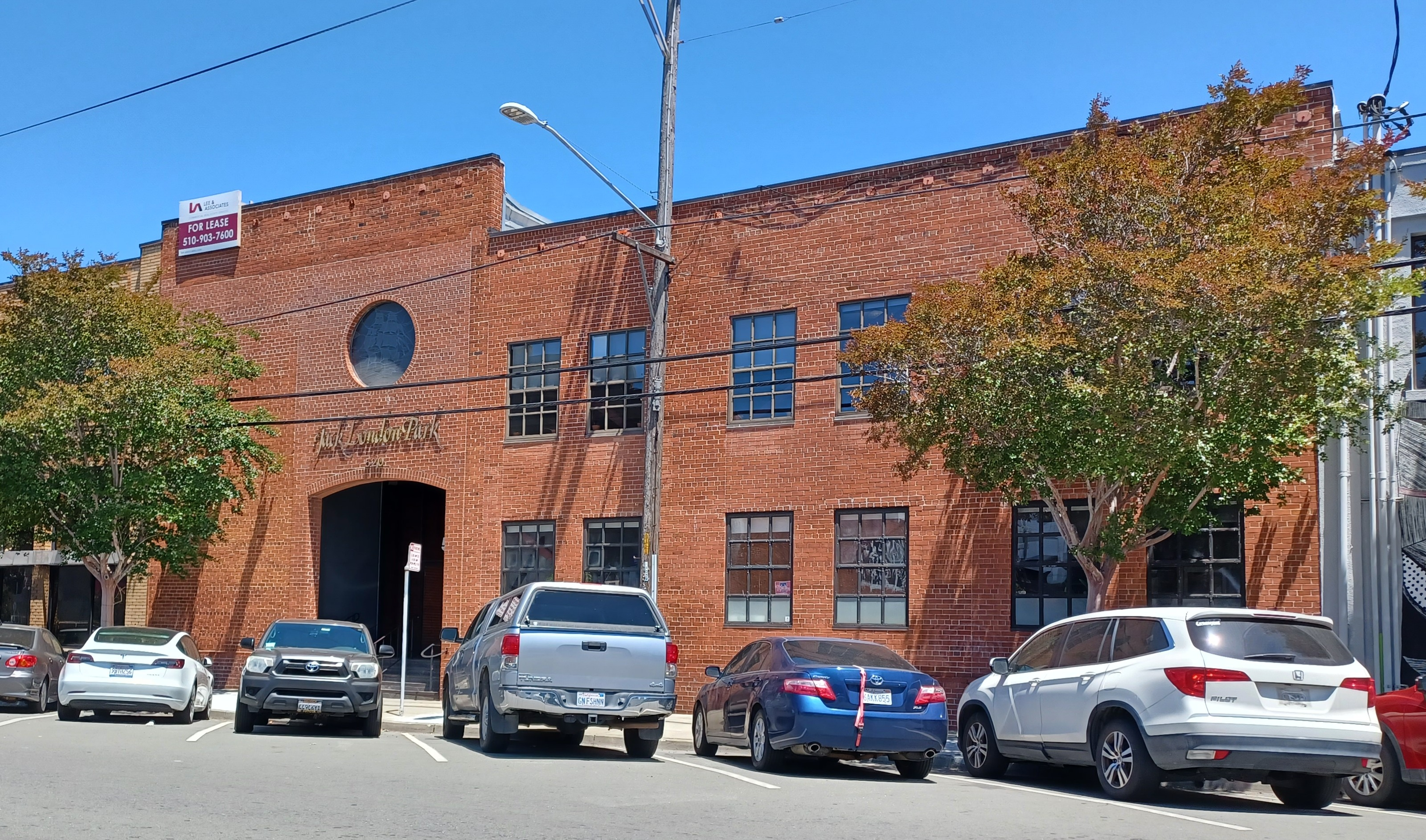
- Headquarters in Oakland
- Founded: 1996
- Type: Non-governmental organization
- Purpose: Environmentalism; Indigenous rights
- Location: Oakland, United States
- Region served: Amazon Basin
- Key people: Leila Salazar-Lopez, executive director
- Revenue: US$ 1,485,169 (2012)
- Website: amazonwatch.org

Amazon Watch is a nonprofit organization founded in 1996, and based in Oakland, California. It works to protect the rainforest and advance the rights of Indigenous peoples in the Amazon Basin. It partners with indigenous and environmental organizations in Ecuador, Peru, Colombia and Brazil in campaigns for human rights, corporate accountability and the preservation of the Amazon's ecological systems.

== Court Cases ==
In 1964, the Texaco Petroleum Company, in partnership with Gulf Oil, began exploring for oil in Northeast Ecuador. In 1974, the Government of the Republic of Ecuador, acting through the state-owned oil agency Petroecuador, obtained a 25% interest. Two years later, Petroecuador acquired Gulf Oil's interest and became a 62.5% owner of the Lago Agrio oil field. By 1993, Petroecuador had also acquired Texaco's interest. After Texaco completed environmental remediation, the Government of Ecuador inspected and certified the work and "absolved, liberated and forever freed" Texaco Petroleum from "any claim or litigation by the Government of Ecuador". Nevertheless, in November 1993, a group of Ecuadorians filed a class action lawsuit on behalf of 30,000 inhabitants of the Oriente region, alleging that Texaco polluted the rainforests. After extensive litigation, the U.S. Court of Appeals affirmed in Aguinda v. Texaco an earlier court's dismissal on the basis of "forum non conveniens". Thus, legal proceedings were started in Ecuador in 2003.

Amazon Watch supports the Ecuadorian plaintiffs by publishing a press kit alleging that Chevron (corporate successor to Texaco) should be held accountable for the dumping of 18 billion US gallons (68,000,000 m^{3}) of toxic wastewater into a region of Ecuador's Amazon rainforest inhabited by more than 30,000 people – purported to be one of the largest oil-related contaminations ever, far exceeding that of the Exxon Valdez disaster. In 2011, a decision in Ecuador ordered Chevron to pay $9.5 billion. Ecuador's Supreme Court in 2013 affirmed the trial court judgment in a 222-page decision that documented the extensive and life-threatening levels of oil pollution at dozens of former Chevron well sites in the jungle. In all, eight appellate judges in Ecuador reviewed the evidence against Chevron and affirmed the judgment, as well as dismissing Chevron's allegation of fraud. When Chevron refused to comply with the $9.5 billion judgment against it for contamination in the Lago Agrio oil field, the plaintiffs' lead attorney, Steven R. Donziger, attempted to collect the judgment in Brazil, Argentina, and Canada. Chevron then filed suit in the United States, and relying on the Racketeer Influenced and Corrupt Organizations Act (RICO Act), alleged that plaintiffs' attorneys in the Lago Agrio litigation had engaged in extortion and fraud by paying almost US$300,000 in bribes to obtain the 2011 court verdict in Ecuador. On 4 March 2014, Judge Lewis A. Kaplan concluded that "the course of justice was perverted" and enjoined Donziger from instituting any enforcement proceedings in the United States. Donziger has appealed to the U.S. Court of Appeals, Second Circuit. Amazon Watch's web page describes its activities in Ecuador as going "beyond supporting indigenous efforts to keep their territories intact and win greater rights guarantees".

Additionally, Amazon Watch is a plaintiff in a case against the US oil company Occidental for its damage to the Peruvian rainforest. The District Court initially granted Occidental's motion to dismiss without ruling on whether Amazon Watch had standing to sue. On appeal, the 9th Circuit Court overturned the dismissal and the Supreme Court declined review.

== Indigenous People of the Amazon Campaigns ==
Amazon Watch is promoting visionary alternatives that could protect the Amazonian environment and local communities. The Yasuni ITT initiative is one such initiative for which Amazon Watch have actively campaigned. The proposal seeks to keep some 900 million barrels of heavy crude that lies underneath Yasuni National Park permanently in the ground in exchange for half of the forgone oil revenues. If done right, the proposal is an important first step towards keeping oil reserves in culturally sensitive and fragile ecosystems in Ecuador and beyond".

Amazon Watch also supported the Achuar indigenous people in opposing oil exploration on their lands by the Canadian oil company Talisman and the Argentinian company Pluspetrol. Moreover, Amazon Watch supports a school that trains indigenous leaders how to defend their rights against oil and mining companies.

In Brazil, the Brazilian government is building the world's third-largest hydroelectric dam on the Xingu River, one of the Amazon's major tributaries. The Belo Monte dam complex would divert 80 percent of the Xingu River's flow, devastating an area of over 1,500 square kilometers of rainforest, and resulting in the forced displacement of up to 40,000 people. With the people of the Xingu and a network of Brazilian and international NGOs, Amazon Watch is working to document and publicize the dam's drastic impacts on local and indigenous populations.

== Amazon Environmental Campaigns ==
Amazon Watch reports that the current rate of deforestation threatens to push the Amazon past a tipping point from which it cannot recover. Reports say that in the last 30 years, 20 percent of the Amazon has been deforested and another 20 percent degraded – all fueled by clearing land for agriculture and large-scale industrial projects such as oil and gas pipelines, dams and roads.

In 2014 Amazon Watch set up Amazon Watch Sweden as an independent nonprofit organization in order to increase fundraising efforts as well as increase advocacy pressure in Europe.

In September 2016 Amazon Watch released a report which concludes that imports of crude oil by the US are driving rainforest destruction in the Amazon and releasing significant greenhouse gases.

On 6 February 2020, the environmental organization Mobilize Earth debuted Guardians of Life, the first of twelve short films that highlight the most pressing issues facing humanity and the natural world. Funds raised by the project will go to Amazon Watch and Extinction Rebellion. Dávid Szőke and Sándor Kiss in Film International expressed criticism of Extinction Rebellion's 2019 short film Extinction and Guardians of Life, saying that:

It is no doubt that film is one of the most meaningful ways of facilitating changes in our world. While Extinction and Guardians of Life declare "nonviolent open rebellion" and the urge to action for the survival of our natural world, the divergence between their stated ideals and their disruptive tactics in shaping public understanding of climate-related issues point toward starkly opposite directions. Despite their alleged advocacy of environmental issues, the involvement of such movie stars as Emma Thompson or Joaquin Phoenix redirects attention to their celebrity status, eclipsing the focus on the ecological solutions they should represent. Thus, these films can be viewed as nothing more than glossy facades, effectively disguising the radical environmental actions of XR activists under a more inclusive, media-friendly veneer.
