= Zion Lights =

British science communicator and environmental activist (born 1984)

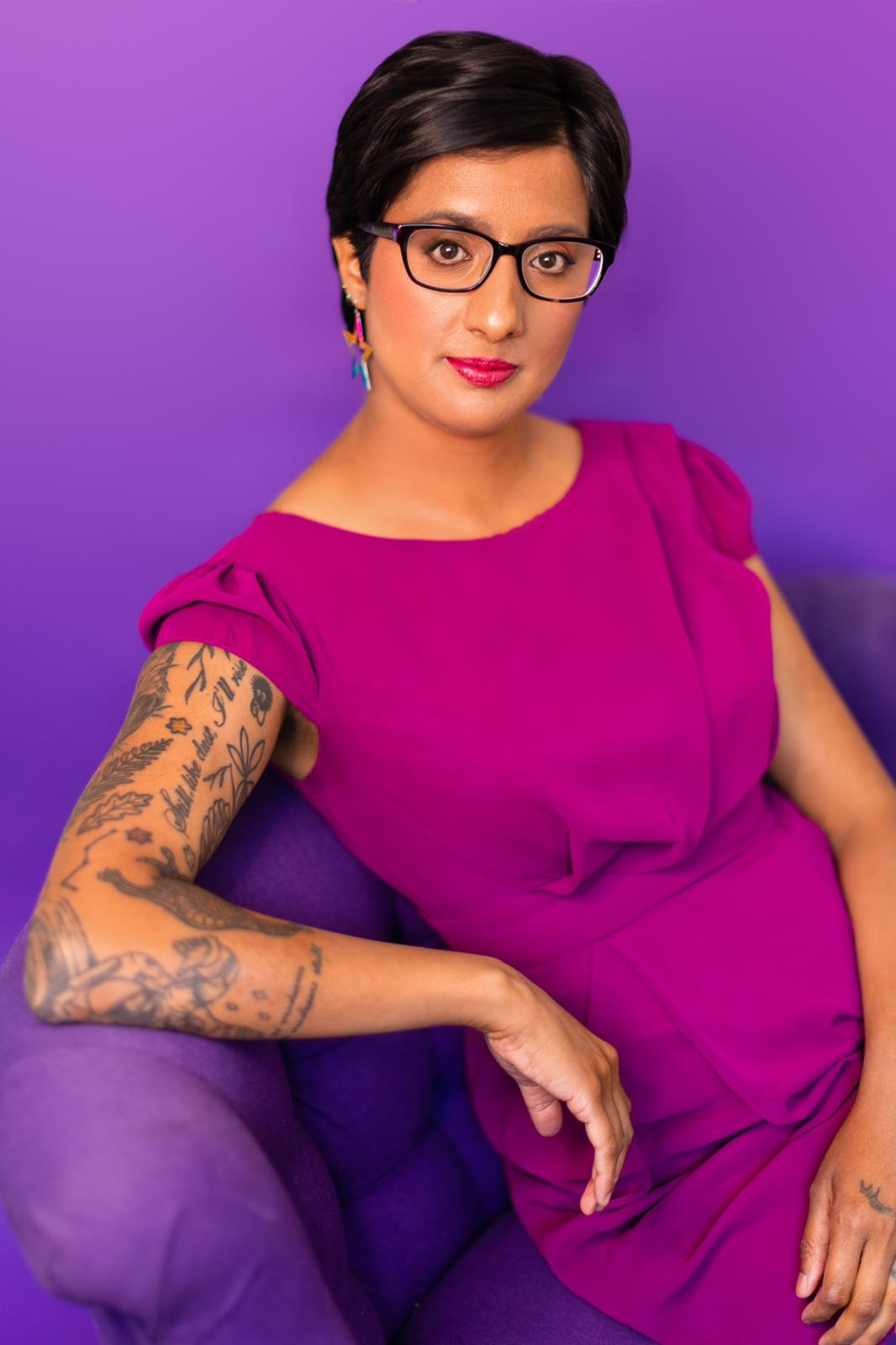
- Zion Lights
- Born: June 1984 (age 42); West Midlands, England
- Education: University of Reading; University of the West of England, Bristol (MSc)
- Children: 2
- Website: zionlights.co.uk

Zion Lights is a British science communicator, writer, author, and former environmental activist known for her pivot to advocacy of evidence-based environmental policy, particularly her support for nuclear energy as a tool for decarbonisation. She is author of the book Energy is Life: Why Environmentalism Went Nuclear that presents the environmental case for nuclear power. She is a prominent voice in debates about climate change, energy policy, humanism, and the role of scientific reasoning in public discourse.

Lights has also written the nonfiction book The Ultimate Guide to Green Parenting and has contributed to numerous books and been featured in several documentaries. She was a spokesperson for Extinction Rebellion (XR) UK on TV and radio between 2018 and 2020, and founded and edited XR's Hourglass newspaper. Lights also wrote a column for The Huffington Post for several years and her writing appears regularly in Quillette and Human Progress.

== Early life ==
Lights was born in the West Midlands. Her parents immigrated to the UK from a small village in the Punjab in India and were factory workers in Birmingham. When she was young, Lights made an appearance on Junior Mastermind. Her first poem was published in an anthology when she was 12.

Lights attended the University of Reading and later completed an MSc in Science Communication at the University of the West of England in 2019.

== Career ==
Zion Lights writes about environmentalism, energy policy, and technological solutions to climate and ecological challenges, often critiquing mainstream environmental approaches and advocating evidence-based alternatives such as nuclear power and gene-edited crops. Her articles include analyses of the economics of nuclear power, calls for the green movement to stop demonising nuclear, discussions of gene-edited seeds and GMOs, and critiques of traditional environmentalism’s emphasis on unfounded narratives. She emphasises technological innovation and data-driven policy as essential for effective climate action and sustainability and has argued that technology is feminist as a tool that has historically liberated women.

Lights joined the Camp for Climate Action movement in 2006, where she was arrested multiple times for protesting coal and tar sands investment, and witnessed police brutality at the Kingsnorth camp.

Lights has made multiple media appearances on British daytime television including on Good Morning Britain and The Andrew Neil Show, primarily when she was a spokesperson for Extinction Rebellion. She has also been featured in several documentaries about climate change and nuclear power globally, including a documentary that was produced for the German public channel ARD in 2022 and the Australian documentary The Clean Energy Debate in 2021 She featured in the documentary NOW. by German filmmaker Jim Rakete and the Al Jazeera documentary What Is Climate Change?

She has written two nonfiction books, the first titled The Ultimate Guide to Green Parenting (2015). and he narrative nonfiction Energy is Life: Why Environmentalism Went Nuclear. She has contributed numerous other books, including Zero Waste Kids, co-authored with Robin Greenfield. In 2018 she released her first poetry collection, Only a Moment. Lights' poetry has appeared in the Tolpuddle Special of Citizen 32 magazine, in Musings, a poetry collection collated to raise funds for La Leche League GB, and most in the collection A Nightingale Sang, a limited poetry magazine created for New Networks for Nature.

Lights is an advocate for science and scientific evidence to determine policy and a humanist. In 2015 the Western Morning News newspaper reported that she is against pseudoscience. In 2018 she gave a TEDx talk on astronomy, entitled "Don't forget to look up", at the University of Bristol. In August 2015, Lights was dubbed 'Britain's greenest mother' by The Daily Telegraph newspaper. In September 2015 Lucy Siegle, writing in The Observer, described Lights as "an eco pragmatist, happily heavy on evidence. She has no truck with hippy myths – she does believe you should vaccinate your child." Lights supports nuclear energy, which led her to leave the Green Party. She authored a paper for Knowmad Institut on the Sustainable Development Goals (SDGs), addressing the omission of nuclear energy from the goals and highlighting that fossil fuels are included while nuclear is not.

She was a columnist for the Express & Echo newspaper for six months in 2014. She was co-editor of Juno magazine for 7 years and wrote for The Huffington Post. Lights left Juno in 2019 to work for Extinction Rebellion where she was part of XR UK's Media & Messaging team. She founded and edited the XR newspaper The Hourglass, a print newspaper focused on climate reporting, which launched in September 2019 and ran until May 2020. As spokesperson for Extinction Rebellion Lights spoke and wrote frequently in the media to discuss the urgent need to tackle climate change, the need to make evidence-based policy decisions, and to defend civil disobedience as a tactic for action on climate change.

She appeared on the BBC multiple times to discuss the power of protest and need for climate action, and was interviewed on Ed Miliband's podcast Reasons to be Cheerful.

She left XR after an interview on The Andrew Neil Show in October 2019 where she was unwilling to defend the claim a co-founder of Extinction Rebellion had made that 6 billion people would die by the end of the century due to climate change. The interview went viral and received widespread media coverage and criticism. Soon after the interview Lights went public about the claim, telling the BBC that: "It's a headline-grabbing assertion - but unfortunately, it's also not true, or certainly not backed up by any evidence. As was obvious to anyone who knows me - and even to the casual viewer - I was plunged into a PR nightmare. I could not defend the number, but as the official spokesperson nor could I be seen to condemn it. All I could do, instead, was flounder under the hot glare of the studio lights for what felt like an eternity.". In response, Extinction Rebellion defended the claim and called on the media to de-platform Lights.

She later criticised Extinction Rebellion, arguing that they often emphasise symbolic or system-change-oriented proposals rather than practical measures to reduce emissions. She stated that discussions on energy policy within Extinction Rebellion were dismissed as irrelevant unless they involve broader systemic change, while she has argued for prioritising the rapid deployment of affordable, clean energy.

She was awarded the Holyoake lecture medal by Humanists UK, of which she is a Patron, in 2023 for her work on climate and science communication and human flourishing.

Her talks focus on the importance of communicating science effectively, the need for evidence-based solutions to problems like climate change, the problems with environmentalism, clean energy, her experiences of being a woman of colour in the green movement and a lone wolf as a woman in nuclear advocacy before it became popular.

== Politics ==
Between 2021 and 2024 Lights was a Labour City Councillor for the Pennsylvania ward in Exeter.

Lights was previously a Green Party member, but quit citing disagreements over nuclear energy: “There were two Green Party members on stage with a scientist from the UK Met Office.” They talked for a long time about renewables but never mentioned nuclear, “So I asked the question to the scientist: ‘The research I'm reading says we need nuclear alongside renewables’. But the host of the event didn't allow him to answer on the mic. The other panellists just said, ‘we don't need nuclear’ and everyone cheered! I quit the Green Party on the same day.”

== Nuclear energy ==
Soon after leaving XR, Lights became a Director of the UK branch of Environmental Progress, an organisation founded and directed by Michael Shellenberger to advocate for nuclear energy. Zion originally contacted Shellenberger to complain about an article he had written for Forbes in which she was pictured alongside Greta Thunberg, US Congresswoman Alexandria Ocasio-Cortez, Bill McKibben and a koala under the title 'Why Apocalyptic Claims About Climate Change Are Wrong'.

During a heated conversation, Shellenberger brought up environmentalist opposition to nuclear energy, and Lights told him that she had already changed her mind and was in favour of nuclear energy. She was offered a job advocating for it, and wrote that "It is time to focus on solutions. It's crucial that environmental activists tell the truth about nuclear power, instead of giving into peer pressure and fear."

After 5 months as the European Director of Environmental Progress, Lights left to set up her own climate activist group, Emergency Reactor, which she founded alongside philanthropist Daniel Aegerter, Robert Stone, and former Extinction Rebellion member Joel Scott-Halkes. She eventually brought new and old advocates to nuclear advocacy, including Mark Lynas who took part in the events she organising to rally for nuclear across the UK.

Lights has now become one of the most sought-after speakers in the world on nuclear energy, speaking regularly in Parliament, writing for newspapers around the world including German newspaper Die Welt, and appearing in French press and media including op eds and interviews in l'Express, la Tribune, France 24, Atlantico, le Point, Marianne, and l'Opinion. She has compared being anti-nuclear to being anti-vaccination and told French press that "every nuclear power plant closure is a crime against humanity". Lights' outspokenness on nuclear power led to a surge of nuclear communicators and influencers, including influencer Isabelle Boemeke who interviewed Lights in 2021 and described being emboldened by Lights' nuclear advocacy in the interview.

Emergency Reactor has undertaken several protests and rallies in UK cities, including staging a wedding between nuclear and renewables at COP26. An action taken in London involving projecting pro-nuclear images onto government buildings has since been repeated in several cities including Paris, New York and Germany. She has written numerous articles to address the myths around nuclear energy, stating in OpenDemocracy that she was once frequently attacked for doing so, before nuclear power became more popular and attracted new speakers and influencers like Grace Stanke.

== Personal life ==
Lights lives in Devon with her two daughters. She is a humanist and a patron of Humanists UK.

== Publications ==
- More Things Should Be Thought Out Thus: A Story of Many Stories, and Many Stories About One Story. Self-published, 2010. ISBN 978-1445239125.
- The Ultimate Guide to Green Parenting. New Internationalist, 2015. ISBN 978-1780262482.
- Only a Moment. Self-published, 2018. ISBN 978-0244723903.
- Energy is Life: Why Environmentalism Went Nuclear. Unicorn Publishing, 2026. ISBN 978-1917458450.
