= Gail Bradbrook =

British scientist and co-founder of Extinction Rebellion (born 1972)

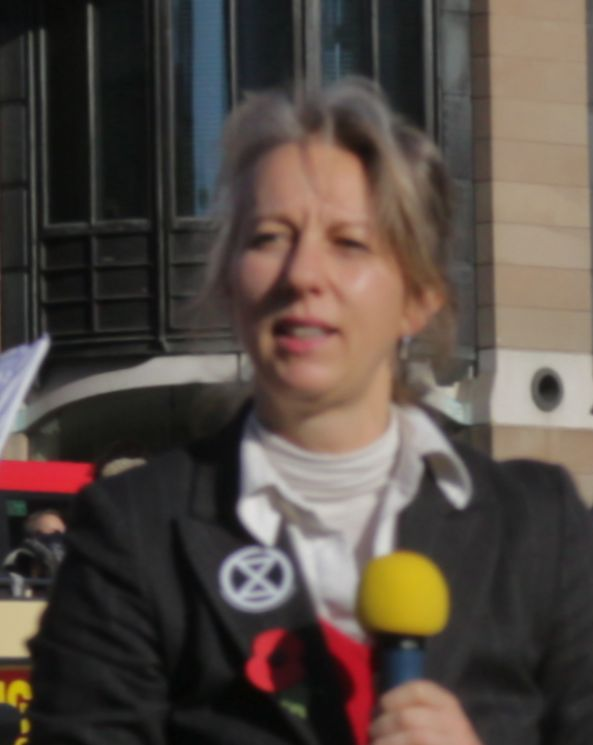
- Bradbrook in 2018
- Born: Gail Marie Bradbrook; 30 April 1972 (age 54); Hemsworth, West Yorkshire, England
- Education: University of Manchester
- Known for: Co-founder of Extinction Rebellion
- Spouse: Jeff Forshaw (div.)
- Children: 2

Gail Marie Bradbrook (born 30 April 1972) is a British environmental activist and molecular biophysicist who co-founded the environmental social movement Extinction Rebellion.

== Early life and career ==
Bradbrook was born in 1972 and grew up in South Elmsall in West Yorkshire. Her father worked at a mine in South Kirkby. She studied molecular biophysics at the University of Manchester, gaining a PhD. She carried out postdoctoral work in India and France.

From 2003 to 2017 she was 'director of strategy' at Citizens Online, an organisation promoting wider internet access for disabled users, including launching a 'Fix the Web' campaign in November 2010.

== Activism ==
An interest in animal rights led Bradbrook to join the Green Party at the age of 14.

She has been involved in various campaigning groups in Stroud, including a 2010 to 2013 period as voluntary director of Transition Stroud, an anti-fracking protest, various actions in opposition to the building of a local incinerator, including a naked protest, and an early Extinction Rebellion roadblock in Merrywalks, Stroud. In 2015, with George Barda, she set up the group Compassionate Revolution (which morphed into Rising Up!, out of which came Extinction Rebellion). "Bradbrook had been involved in the Occupy movement and campaigns around peak oil, but they failed to take off."

In 2016, she went on a psychedelic retreat to Costa Rica, "where she took ayahuasca, iboga and kambo, in search of some clarity in her work." That experience "made her change her approach" to campaigning. Soon after returning she met Roger Hallam and together they came up with Extinction Rebellion.

Bradbrook wants to raise awareness of the dangers from anthropogenic climate change and believes that only civil disobedience on a large scale can bring about the change that is needed.

In November 2020 she was included in the BBC Radio 4 Woman's Hour Power list 2020.

In August 2021, Bradbrook acknowledged that she drives a 1.5l Citroen diesel car. She said she could not afford an electric car and she needed the vehicle to drive her children to sports matches.

== Personal life ==
Bradbrook has been married twice, the first time to Jeffrey Forshaw. She has two sons. She lives in Stroud as does her ex-partner Simon Bramwell, who is also a co-founder of Extinction Rebellion.

== Court Proceedings and Sentencing ==
On 2 November 2023, after a three-day trial, Bradbrook was found guilty of criminal damage, for breaking a pane of reinforced security glass at the Department for Transport, costing £27,660, in protest against HS2. Convicted by a jury at Isleworth Crown Court, Bradbrook acknowledged her actions and the lack of a lawful excuse as argued by the prosecution, but she stood by her motivations for environmental advocacy. The judge maintained the trial focused on the illegal act, not the wider climate issues. Bradbrook, who represented herself, argued her protest was peaceful and necessary after other advocacy methods failed. At Isleworth Crown Court in West London on 18 December 2023, Bradbrook was given a 15-month suspended sentence, with 150 hours of unpaid work and a year-long supervision order.

== Bibliography ==
- Gail Bradbrook (2019). "What is our place in these times?". In Extinction Rebellion (ed.). This Is Not a Drill: An Extinction Rebellion Handbook. Penguin Books. pp. 185–186. ISBN 9780141991443.
