= Global Climate March =

2015 climate change protests

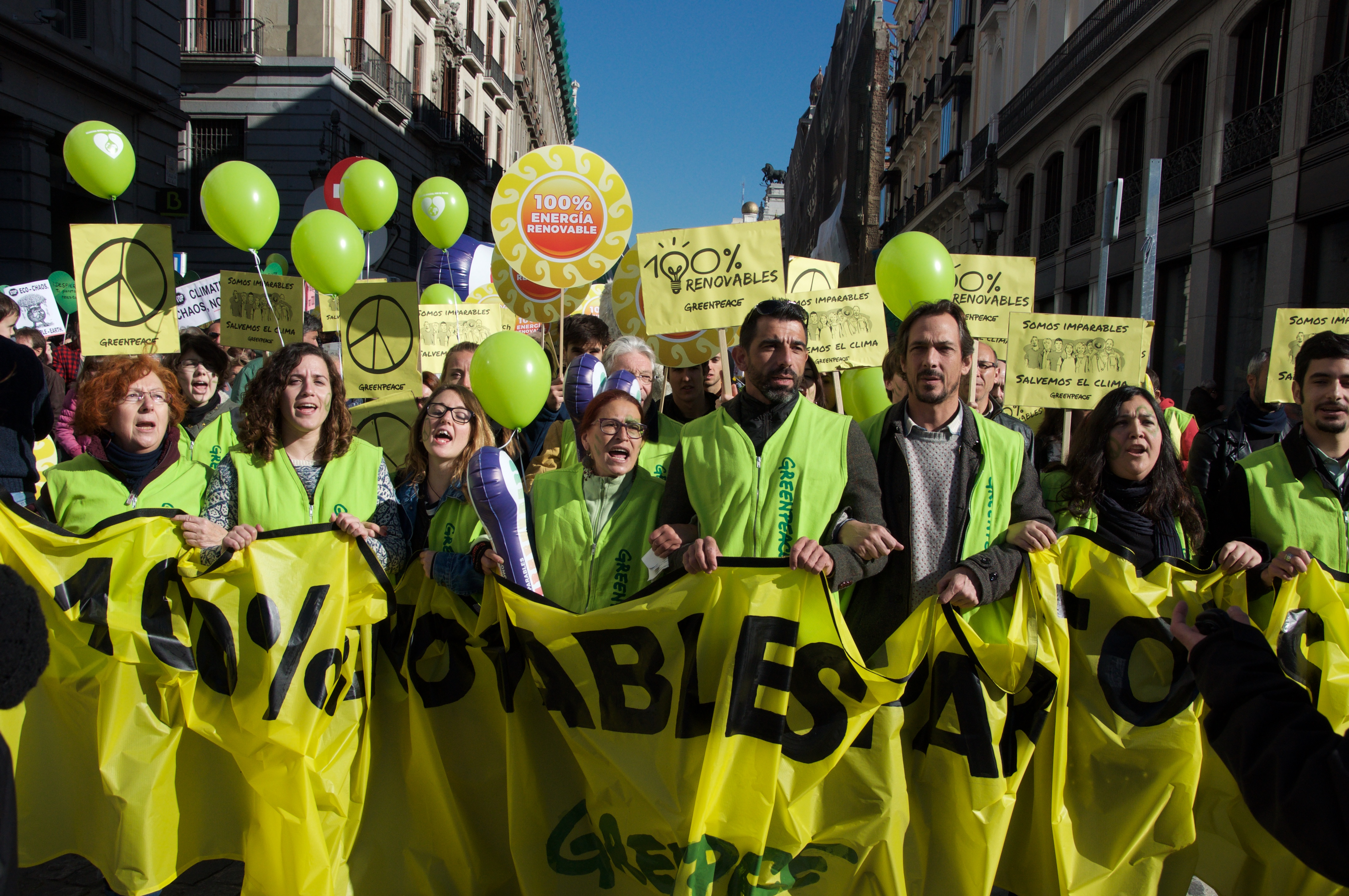
Greenpeace activists, demanding 100% renewable energy at Climate March 2015 in Madrid.

The Global Climate March took place in various cities around the world on 29 November 2015, the day before the opening of the 2015 United Nations Climate Change Conference. The march was organized by a huge coalition of climate groups and global activists (such as Avaaz and the international environmental organization 350.org), and involved more than 2,000 events around the globe, in 175 countries. An estimated number of 785,000 people took part at the marches.

On 30 November, the first day of the conference, a "Climate strike" was organised by students in over 100 countries; over 50,000 people participated.

Follow-on marches scheduled in 2017 included the March for Science on 22 April 2017) and the People's Climate Mobilization on 29 April 2017.

== The march ==
Partially inspired by the People's Climate March held in 2014, the Global Climate March did not have a main event, but had extended all over Europe, Oceania, North America, South America, Africa and Asia. The more crowded rallies took place in Adelaide, Amsterdam, Auckland, Austin, Barcelona, Beirut, Berlin, Bern, Brisbane, Budapest, Canberra, Christchurch, Copenhagen, Curitiba, Dhaka, Dumaguete, Edinburgh, Geneva, Helsinki, Ho Chi Minh City, Hong Kong, Johannesburg, Kampala, Kyiv, Kyoto, Lille, Lisbon, London, Los Angeles, Lugano, Lyon, Madrid, Manila, Marseille, Melbourne, Mexico City, New Delhi, New York City, Oakland, Oslo, Ottawa, Perth, Rennes, Rome, Seoul, Seville, St. Gallen, Stockholm, Sydney, São Paulo, Taipei, Tokyo, Valencia, Vancouver, Washington D.C., Wellington and Zurich. According to the organizers, the largest marches took place in Melbourne and London, where Radiohead's frontman Thom Yorke set up a DJ-set for the crowd. 20,000 people marched in Madrid and a similar number in Rome. In Paris, because of the ban on public gatherings in the wake of recent terrorist attacks, 10,000 pairs of shoes were laid out in an installation to represent the people who could not march.

== See also ==
- Earth Day (Annually on 22 April)
- List of environmental protests
- Environmental politics
- IPCC Fifth Assessment Report
- March for Science (22 April 2017)
- Paris Agreement
- People's Climate March (2014)
- Politics of global warming
