= Bolívar Canton, Manabí =

Coordinates: 0°50′31″S 80°09′43″W

Bolívar Canton
- Canton
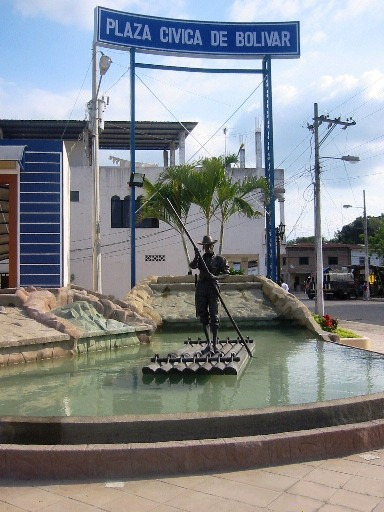

- Flag

- Location of Manabí Province in Ecuador

- Bolívar Canton in Manabí Province
- Country: Ecuador
- Province: Manabí
- Seat: Calceta

Area
  - Total: 524 km^{2} (202 sq mi)

Population (2022 census)
  - Total: 41,827
  - Density: 79.8/km^{2} (207/sq mi)

Bolívar is a canton located in the northeast of the province of Manabí, Ecuador. It borders the canton Pichincha in the east, the cantons Portoviejo and Junín in the south and the cantons Tosagua and Chone in the north, and cover an area of 524 km².

== Demographics ==
Ethnic groups as of the Ecuadorian census of 2010:

- Mestizo 73.3%
- Montubio 19.1%
- Afro-Ecuadorian 4.4%
- White 3.1%
- Indigenous 0.1%
- Other 0.1%
