= La Manga del Cura =

Territory in Ecuador

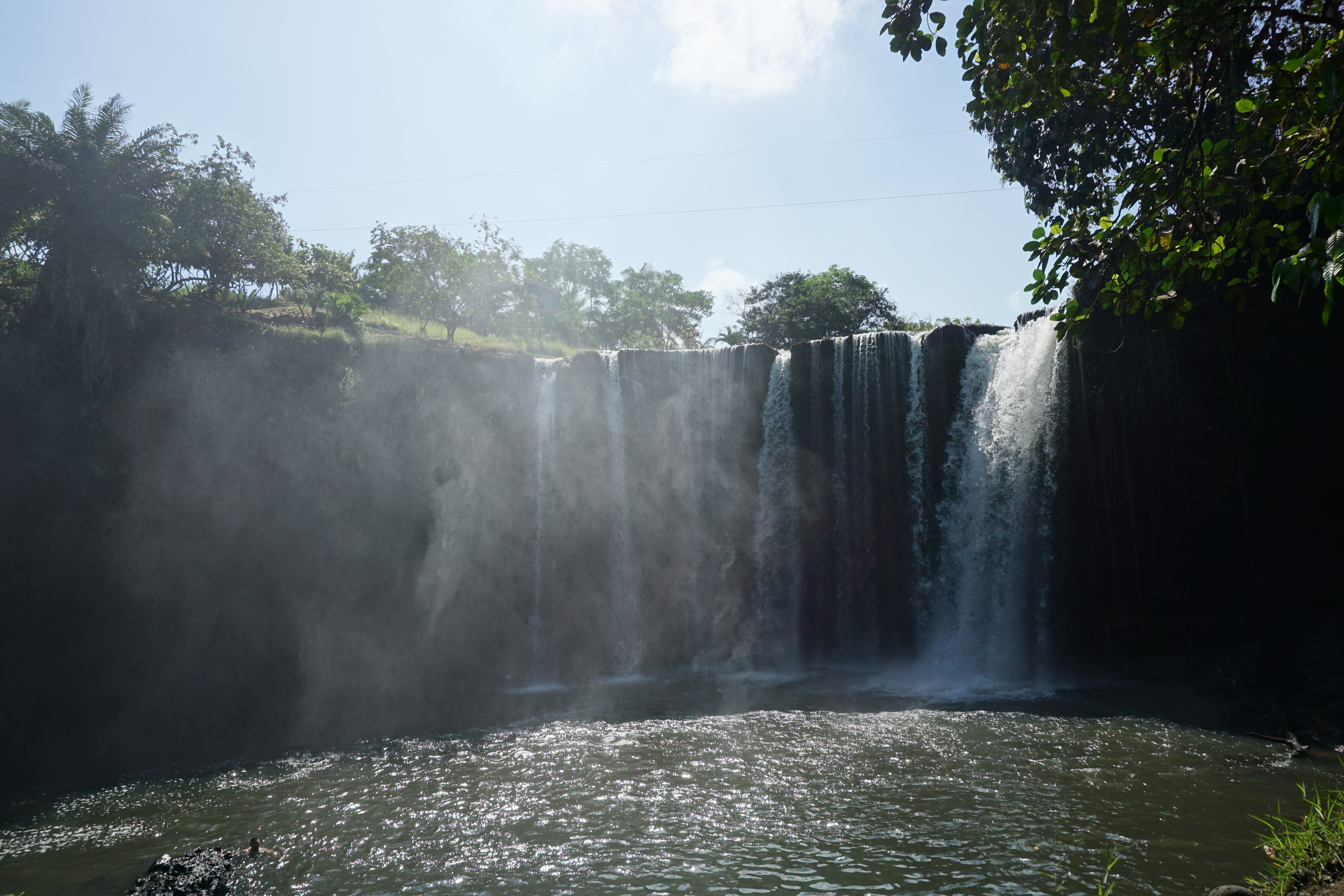
Cascada del Salto del Armadillo

La Manga del Cura is a territory located in the Manabí Province belonging to the canton El Carmen in Ecuador.

The territory covers an area of approximately 487 square kilometres (188 sq mi) with around 24,000 inhabitants.

One of the most important tourist sites in the territory is the Cascada del Salto del Armadillo of 30 metres (98 ft) high.

== History ==
The first mention of La Manga del Cura comes from 1837, when a resident of Daule Canton, Nicolás Avilés, bought the area of the San Francisco de Peripa hill (that belonged to the area described) for 100 pesos. The name of the place honors the parish priest Luis María Pinto, who in 1928 opened, at the tip of a machete, a path (narrow path between palisades or fences, called in South America "manga") from Calceta to Pichincha, in order to reduce the hours of travel between both places.

=== 2015 status referendum ===
2015 La Manga del Cura status referendum
- 27 September 2015
- Which provincial jurisdiction do you want the sector called "La Manga del Cura" to belong to? Spanish: ¿A qué jurisdicción provincial quiere usted que pertenezca el sector denominado "La Manga del Cura"?

Results
Join Manabí	64.2%
Join Guayas	33.0%
Invalid votes	2.2%
Blank votes	0.7%

The referendum of La Manga del Cura status was held in La Manga del Cura zone on 27 September 2015 to decide to which Ecuadorian province it would belong. Until 2015 it was considered an undefined area and therefore had no administrative or political membership to any canton or province of Ecuador and was in dispute by the four provinces bordering Guayas, Manabí, Santo Domingo and Los Ríos. After multiple attempts to resolve this conflict, Guayas and Manabí persisted in the litigation, which led to a referendum held on 27 September 2015, through which by majority its inhabitants decided the accession of the territory to the province of Manabí.

Although in previous years there were four provinces that claimed this sector as part of their territory, Guayas and Manabí remained firm in their arguments but given that this territorial dispute could not be resolved at the level of other instances it was due to call a popular consultation as contemplated by law.

The National Electoral Council of Ecuador determined that the consultation would take place on 27 September 2015, and 15,342 people would participate. This number was determined after an Electoral Census that the NEC conducted in that sector.

The term designated by the National Electoral Council for the electoral campaign by the prefectures of the provinces of Guayas and Manabí was September 19 to 24, 2015.

The preparations for the referendum began during the month of September. On 21 September 2015, a simulacrum was held in the Santa María La Guayas electoral precinct. The process was carried out on 27 September 2015, at 54 Voting Receiving Boards, two days after electoral workers began visiting homes to assist the disabled with voting. It was attended by international control bodies, such as the electoral authority of Peru and representatives of USAN, as well as with the collaboration of the Armed Forces and approximately 520 National Police personnel. The budget allocated for the referendum was $515,975.63.

These were the results:

Choice	Votes	%
✓ Join Manabí	8,525	64.2
Join Guayas	4,380	33.0
Invalid votes	291	2.2
Blank votes	88	0.7
Total	13,285	100
Registered voters/turnout	15,342	86.59

=== Territorial limit ===
Finally, on 11 April 2017, the National Assembly of Ecuador in session 443 of the Plenary and in the second debate, approved the bill that established the territorial limit of La Manga del Cura, with 93 votes in favor and 5 abstentions. This resolution was published in the Supplement to the Official Register No. 994 on April 28, 2017.
