= Manuel Félix López =

Ecuadorian businessman and politician

Manuel Felix Lopez
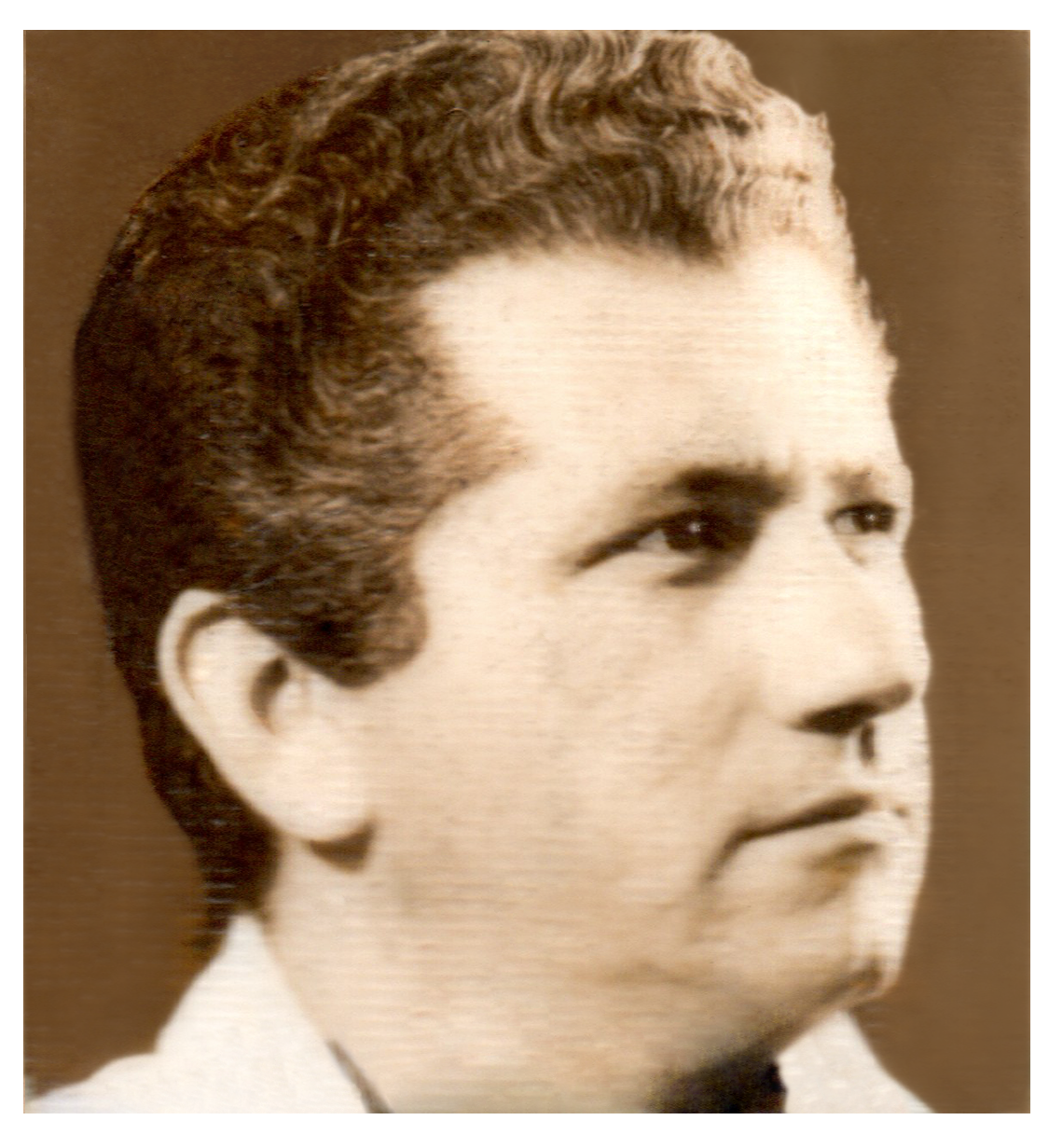

Vice president of Andean Parliament
- In office 1985–1986
- President: Julio Garret
- Preceded by: Gary Esparza
- Succeeded by: Andrés Vallejo

Mayor of Bolívar
- In office 1970–1972
- Preceded by: Hermógenes Zambrano
- Succeeded by: Álvaro Ormaza

National Deputy
- In office 1992–1996

Provincial Deputy
- In office 1984–1988

Councilor of Bolívar
- In office 1966–1970

Personal details
- Born: November 17, 1937; Junin, Ecuador
- Died: January 1, 2004 (aged 66); Portoviejo, Ecuador
- Political party: Social Christian Party, Republican Unity Party
- Spouses: Frayda Montesdeoca (m. 1959; div. 1987) Olinda Lara (m. 1992)
- Children: Manuel Gustavo, Sandra Jacinta, Jorge Eliécer, Ángel Guillermo and Manuel Andrés.
- Parent(s): Quinche Felix; Jacinta Lopez

Manuel Enrique Félix López (November 17, 1937 – January 1, 2004) was an Ecuadorian businessman and politician.

== Early life ==
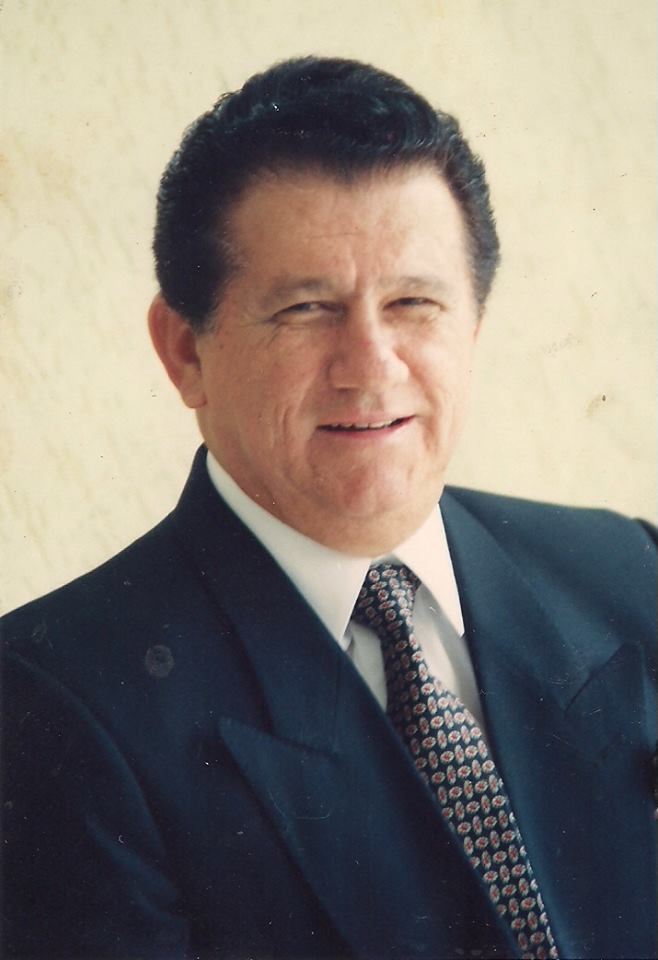
Official portrait of his last period as deputy in 1996

He was born in Junin, the fourth of the 13 children of Quinche J. Felix Rezabala and Jacinta Maria Lopez Loor. Lopez was born into a family of merchants and closely linked to the politics of the region, as his father was the mayor. His family lived in Calceta.

== Career ==
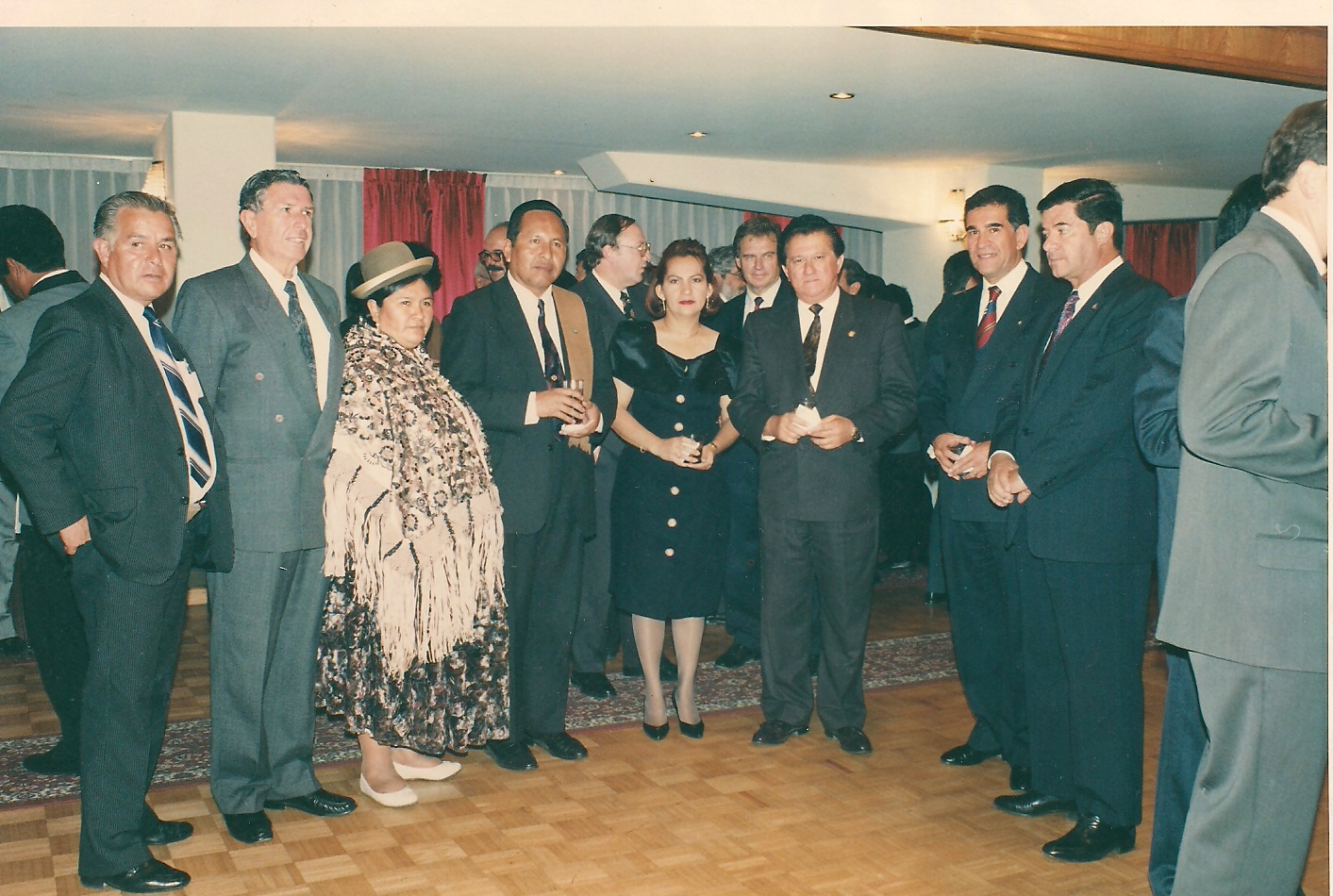
With the mayor of La Paz, Bolivia; Rolando Enrique Rojas in 1995

During his youth, he was councilor of Bolivar twice (1966 and 1979). In 1970 he was appointed mayor. With the return of democracy in Ecuador, he was elected as Councilor of Manabí (1981–1984), and served as Director of the "Centro de Rehabilitación de Manabí CRM", on behalf of municipalities and former President of the extinct "Junta de Recursos Hidráulicos de Jipijapa".

In 1984, he was involved in the release of national political figure León Febres Cordero. Febres Cordero won the elections for President of Ecuador. Meanwhile, Manuel Felix Lopez was elected Deputy, continuing until 1988.

In 1985, he was appointed as a delegate to the Andean Parliament, based in Bogotá, the same year he was its vice president.

During 1991 he and other social Christian deserters helped Sixto Durán Ballén to found the Republican Unity Party. Manuel Felix was appointed Congressman because he was in the list of alternate candidates, and the elected deputy Roberto Dunn was designated as minister of government. Félix was the National Director of the governing party. Once more, the national Congress delegated him to the Andean Parliament, now based in La Paz, Bolivia, where he was declared as the guest of honor by mayor Rolando Enrique Rojas.

One of his achievements as National Deputy was the management of the law No. 116 of April 29, 1996; that creates the "Instituto Tecnológico Superior Agropecuario de Manabí" (ITSAM, as the Spanish initials) as the first university of Calceta.

In 1999 the National Congress of Ecuador created law No. 99-25 of April 30, that changes the name of the ITSAM, in the "Escuela Superior Politécnica Agropecuaria de Manabí".

In 2000, he was a candidate for Mayor of Calceta, his last appearance in Ecuadorian politics before his death at Portoviejo.

== Legacy ==
In 2004 as a post-mortem tribute, a group of Calceta citizens proposed that the name of Félix be added to ESPAM and on June 15, 2006, the Ecuadorian National Congress published a reform to law 99-25 that highlighted Félix as a "tireless dreamer and idealist who achieved with perseverance in the National Congress the creation of the "Instituto Tecnológico Superior Agropecuario de Manabí (ITSAM)" later called ESPAM, and now "Escuela Superior Politécnica Agropecuaria de Manabí "Manuel Félix López".

== See also ==
- Luis Félix López
- Lucho Gatica
