= Pedro Carbo =

- Town
- Location in Province of Guayas, Ecuador

- Location within Ecuador
- Coordinates: 1.81789°S 80.23304°W
- Country: Ecuador
- Province: Province of Guayas
- Canton: Pedro Carbo
- Established as Cantón: July 19, 1984

Government
  - Mayor: Nery Jaramillo

Area
  - Town: 6.25 km^{2} (2.41 sq mi)

Population (2022 census)
  - Town: 24,882
  - Density: 3,980/km^{2} (10,300/sq mi)
  - Demonym: Carbence
  - Official Language: Spanish
- Time zone: UTC-5 (ECT)
  - Summer (DST): UTC-5 (ECT)
- Climate: Aw
- Website: www.pedrocarbo.gov.ec

Pedro Carbo is a town located in the coastal Guayas, Ecuador, near Manabí province. It is located at the 63 kilometer marker on the road from Guayaquil to Manabí. It is the seat of Pedro Carbo Cantón, founded in 1984. As of the census of 2022 the town had a population of 24,882. The town is named after Pedro Carbo Noboa, a 19th-century politician, diplomat and writer from Guayaquil.

== History ==
The area now known as Pedro Carbo was once called "Rio Nuevo" (new river) and was an important town in the parroquia "San Juan de Soledad", now known as the town of Isidro Ayora (located to the east of Pedro Carbo). On August 1, 1893 the name was changed to Caamaño and was designated a rural parroquia of the cantón Daule, located to the east. The town kept the name Caamaño until 1895 during the Liberal Revolution, when its name was changed to honor Pedro Carbo Noboa. In the Territorial Division Law of 1897, the change was officially documented. Finally on July 12, 1984 the president of the Republic, Oswaldo Hurtado Larrea, declared the formation of Cantón Pedro Carbo, which was published in the Civil Registry N° 790 on July 19, 1984

== Nomenclature ==
Pedro Carbo is named after Pedro Carbo Noboa, a politician, diplomat and writer. He was born in Guayaquil March 19, 1813, son of Coronel José Carbo Unzueta and Mrs. Josefa Noboa. He grew up in Guayaquil then moved to Mexico for a time before returning to Guayaquil. He became a public figure in 1835 when he was appointed Official Mayor of the Ministry of Interior and Exterior Relations. His subsequent political roles include Secretary of the Encoder Commission, Secretary of Ecuadorian Legation and worked in business negotiations with New Granada and Peru.

In 1845, he was named General Minister of the Provisional Government after the Marxist Revolution. As a commissioner for the government of Guayaquil, he also played an integral part in the negotiations of terms for the Virginia Treaty. He attended the National Convention as the Deputy of the Province of Guayas in 1845 and later represented the provinces of Guayas, Pinchincha and Chimborazo in various Assemblies. He was proposed as a presidential candidate in 1864 but did not run and instead focused his energies on attacking the regime of Gabriel García Moreno, after which he went into exile in Paris then Peru. He died December 24, 1894.

== Geography ==
Pedro Carbo is located in the coastal province of Guayas, Ecuador. It is located at the 63 kilometer marker on the road from Guayaquil to Manabí.

Territorial Limits

North and East: Paján Canton (Manabí Province)

South: Santa Elena Canton (Santa Elena Province)

East: Isidro Ayora Canton and Colimes Canton (Province of Guayas)

Area: Cantón Pedro Carbo has an area of 363.7 mi2 (942 km2)

Climate: The annual average temperature is 80.6 °F (27 °C) with an average yearly rainfall of 31.2 inches (79.3 cm). Most of the high temperatures and rainfall occur during the hot rainy season (invierno) which lasts from mid-December to mid-June, while the cooler dry season (verano) lasts from mid-June to mid-December. Part of the cantón consists of dry tropical forests, which contain a diverse ecosystem with a wide variety of flora and fauna. The river "Pedro Carbo" which only has water during the rainy season, passes through the cantón and is a source of water for agriculture and tourism.

== Economy ==
The area is primarily agriculturally based with a majority of families with at least one member of the household working in some form of agriculture.

The primary crops are rice, corn, sunflowers (for cooking oil), peanuts, a variety of beans, mangos, and bananas. In areas near water sources is where the most diversity in crops can be found. Cattle and goats are the primary animal husbandry products. Many residents also use local reeds and wood in craft trades, such as expert woodworkers and Panama hat weavers. The streets are lined with merchants selling a wide variety of products, from fruits and vegetables, to street food, to clothing and items for the home.

== Celebrations ==
The two main local holidays in Pedro Carbo are:

-The celebration in honor of Saint Pablo and Saint Pedro, the patron saints of the cantón. Celebrated June 29 each year.

-The celebration of the date when Pedro Carbo was declared a cantón. Celebrated July 19 each year.

The town has a variety of other celebrations and holidays throughout the year, including many international celebration and recognition days. Holidays are typically celebrated with a parade down the main street, public dances, and social ceremonies.

== Politics ==
Current political leaders of Cantón Pedro Carbo (2019–2022):

• Mayor: Xavier Gomez Salazar • Deputy Mayor: Virgilio Ordóñez Ramirez

• General Secretary: Abg. Patricio Laz Macías
