= Luis Félix López =

Ecuadorian doctor, politician and writer

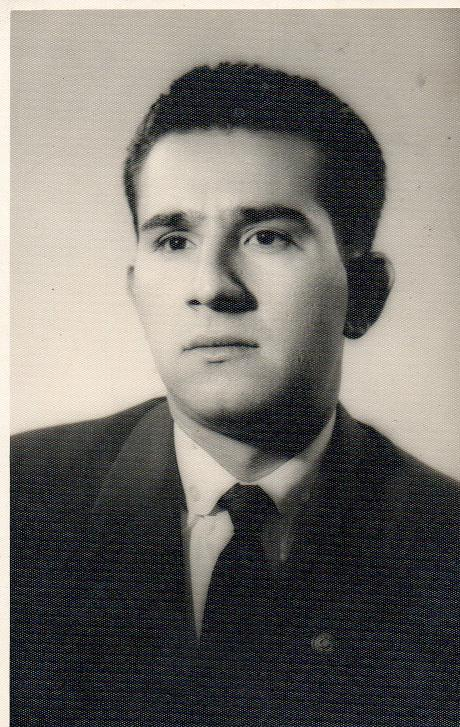
- Born: Luis Ramón Félix López
- Education: National Autonomous University of Mexico
- Writing career
- Genres: Novels, Short stories and poetry
- Notable works: Los Designios, La Noche del Rebaño, El Talisman
- Notable awards: International prize for the novel, Mexico 1973
- Literary movement: Latin American Boom; Magic realism

Political Career

Ministry of Government (E)
- In office January 15, 1990 – July 28, 1990
- President: Rodrigo Borja Cevallos
- Preceded by: Andrés Vallejo
- Succeeded by: César Verduga

Governor of Manabí
- In office 1970–1972
- Preceded by: Ángel Cedeño
- Succeeded by: Medardo Salazar

Mayor of El Carmen
- In office 1967–1970
- Succeeded by: Colón Ortega Mendieta

President of the House of Ecuadorian Culture Core Guayas
- In office 2003–2007
- Preceded by: Jorge Sweet
- Succeeded by: Rosa Amelia Alvarado Roca

National Deputy
- In office 1962–1963

Provincial Deputy for Guayas
- In office 1960–1962

Personal details
- Born: August 25, 1932 Calceta, Ecuador
- Died: December 17, 2008 (aged 76) Guayaquil, Ecuador
- Party: Concentration of People's Forces, Democratic Left
- Spouse: Sara Grijalva (m. 1957)
- Children: Luis Enrique, Fernando, Diego Ricardo and Sandra Lorena.
- Parent(s): Quinche Félix; Jacinta López

Luis Ramón Félix López (Calceta, August 25, 1932 - Guayaquil, December 17, 2008) was an Ecuadorian doctor, politician and renowned writer who held many senior public positions in his country during his lifetime.

== Early life ==
Luis Felix Lopez was the eldest of the 13 children of Quinche Felix Rezabala y Jacinta Maria Lopez Loor.

He received his basic education from the teacher Santa Rezabala, who was prepared him to finish primary school. At the age 12 he entered in the Eloy Alfaro College in Bahía de Caráquez. In 1947 he traveled to Quito, to enter the college "San Gabriel" of the Jesuits, as an intern, where he graduated from high school.

Already his youth, denoted his passion for poetry and writing small poems that reads to the class.

== Profession ==
He studied medicine at the Central University of Ecuador. In 1956, he entered as an intern at IESS Hospital, where he met his future wife, Sara Beatriz Grijalva.

As a physician, studied two specialties in the National Autonomous University of Mexico, gastroenterology and endoscopy. In the Aztec country was director of the endoscopy service of the Netzahualcóyotl General Hospital and medical director of several magazines and scientific publications.

== Political career ==
Luis Felix Lopez enters political life, while still a college student, supporting the candidacy of Carlos Guevara Moreno, founder of the Concentration of People's Forces. In 1960, despite the new triumph of José María Velasco Ibarra in the presidential elections, Luis Felix Lopez became deputy to run in third place in the CFP list.

In 1962 he was reelected as a legislator with Jose Hanna Musse, Eliecer Pérez Jurado y Jaime Aspiazu Seminario. Felix was designated for State Representative to the Board of Special Economic Zones, and in these functions, involved in a political trial, proposed to the Vice President, Reinaldo Varea Donoso, the Minister of Defense and to the General Commander of Ecuadorian Armed Forces for the purchase of so-called "junk" weapons obsolete and overpriced.

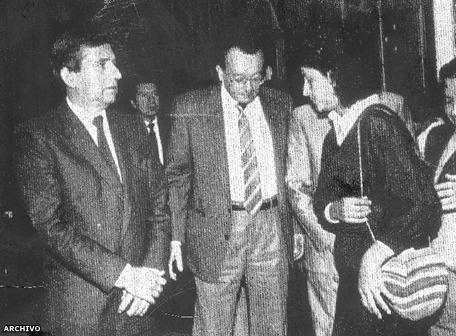
Luis Félix López as minister of government (e), during the surrendering of the Ecuadorian guerrilla

The First Military Joint took power, deposing Carlos Julio Arosemena Monroy from the Presidency in 1963 and dissolved the congress. In these circumstances, Luis Felix Lopez is named Supreme Director of the CFP.

For 1966 returned to live in his home province of Manabi, settling on El Carmen, who was in the middle of a bordering problem between the provinces of Manabi and Pichincha. Luis fought tirelessly and achieved a declaration to El Carmen, as canton and jurisdiction of the province of Manabi and became the first mayor of the canton winning the first elections.

In 1968, he became Director of the Consortium of Municipalities of Manabi, who was in charge of the construction of highways and roads in this province. Then he was Director of the extinct Manabi Rehabilitation Center (CRM) and in 1970 he was appointed governor of the province. In the exercise of this office, the dam "Poza Honda," was built, Regional Water System in La Estancilla, Tosagua; and began the study of the Carrizal River basin, where later the dam "La Esperanza" was built.

With the return to democracy in the 1980s, he entered as an active element of the political party Democratic Left, which would lead in 1988 to Rodrigo Borja to the Presidency of the Republic. During this government, Luis Felix Lopez was Undersecretary and Minister Responsible Government on several occasions.

During his management, he played part in the historic process in which the group "Alfaro Vive Carajo!" decided to give up their weapons, for insertion into civil society.

== Literary works ==
During different periods of his life, Luis Felix Lopez is writing literary works that were worthy of national and international recognition:

- "Los Designios" (1973), Novel finalist of the "International Prize for the Novel, Mexico 1973."
- "El Eco Interminable" (1977), Poetry
- "El Gorrión Canta en la Oscuridad" (1980), finalist Storybook "Guayaquil Group Award"
- "El Talisman" (1994), Story Book.
- "La Noche del Rebaño" (1996), Novel winner of the "Joaquín Gallegos Lara National Fiction Prize" from the Metropolitan District of Quito.
- "Tarda en Morir el Tiempo" (1998), Novel winner of the "National Prize for Literature" of the House of Culture in Guayas
- "El Olor de las Virtudes" (2001), Novel.

== His pass in the culture ==
During his last years, he assumed the presidency of the House of Ecuadorian Culture, Guayas core, in 2003, beginning a process of reconstruction and modernization of the institution, visible both in its physical structure, as in the multiple cultural activities that were developed and in the rebuilding of the museum. He was reelected in 2007. The House of Ecuadorian Culture's National Short Story Competition was then named in his honor.

== Legacy ==
The Ecuadorian national literature contest, category "Tale"; is inspired in his honor.

== See also ==
- Manuel Félix López
- House of Ecuadorian Culture
