= Ecuador Highway 15 =

Highway in Ecuador

Highway 15
- Vía E15
- Pacific Route; Troncal del Pacífico

Route information
- Length: 741.33 km (460.64 mi)

Major junctions
- North end: Colombian border in Esmeraldas Province
- E10 in Esmeraldas Province; E20 in Esmeraldas; E381 in Esmeraldas Province; E382 in Pedernales; E383A in Bahía de Caráquez; E383 in Bahía de Caráquez; E38 in Rocafuerte; E39 in Rocafuerte; E39A in Rocafuerte; E30 in Manta; E483 in Puerto Cayo; E40 in Santa Elena
- South end: Santa Elena

Location
- Country: Ecuador

Highway system
- Highways in Ecuador
← E10	→ E20

Ecuador Highway 15 (E15) is the main coastal trunk highway of mainland Ecuador.

== Route description ==
=== Esmeraldas Province ===
E15 starts on the border with Colombia on a bridge over the Mataje River, in Esmeraldas Province. This section of the route is not near the coast. Near San Lorenzo, there is a connection with E10, which leads east towards Ibarra.

Passing the San Lorenzo area, the trunk begins to skirt the coast through the city of Esmeraldas and the towns of Atacames and Sua. In Esmeraldas, the route links with the start of the Northern Transverse (E20), which connects with Santo Domingo in the Province of Santo Domingo de los Tsáchilas and the capital, Quito, in the province of Pichincha. At the height of the town of Shua, take the road heading south away momentarily from the coast to the town of Pedernales in the province of Manabi.

=== Manabi Province ===
From Cojimíes, in the province of Manabi, E15 returns to skirt the coast through the coastal town of Jama and the coastal cities of Bahia de Caraquez and Manta. In Manta, the backbone connects to the Central Cross (E30) linking it to Portoviejo, Manabi and Latacunga, Cotopaxi, the two east. South of Manta the path of the Core Pacific (E15) leads through the towns of Puerto Cayo Manabi and Puerto Lopez.

=== Santa Elena Province ===
Once in the Province of Santa Elena, E15 passes through a number of villages and seaside resorts of high attraction as Ayampe, Olon, Montañita, Ayangue Ballenita, etc. At the height of the city of Santa Elena, the trunk meets the Southern Cross (E40). The combined route, which carries the designation E15 / E40, extends southwest direction, culminating in the city of Salinas in the west of the Punta de Santa Elena (Point westernmost end Ecuador continental).
