= Picoazá =

Urban parish in Manabí Province, Ecuador

Coordinates: 1°02′S 80°30′W

Picoazá is an urban parish in Portoviejo Canton, Manabí Province, Ecuador. It is situated on the western side of the city of Portoviejo and has a population of nearly 19,000.

== History ==
Archeological finds made in the area in 2008 suggest that Picoazá is the site of a pre-Columbian settlement. In 1907, the second archaeological expedition of Marshall Howard Saville involved the exploration of caves around Picoazá, and in particular the Cerro Jaboncilla and Cerro de Hojas sites, which are 5 kilometres (3.1 mi) away from Picoazá. They provided many important artefacts to Saville. Picoazá was itself the site of a Manteño chiefdom, according to early colonial sources, and contained quantities of characteristic Manteño pottery and large stone foundations. It was split into four major settlements, with the chief of the principal settlement overlord. The archeological site was declared a national cultural patrimony in 2009.

== Tourism and demographics ==
This part of Manabí Province is known for its cuisine, fine beaches, and ceibo trees, which are unique to the region. Picoazá is also a commercial center, distributing agricultural products and consumer goods.

The average family income in Picoazá is about US$120 per month. The town has inadequate potable water, sewers, and telephone service.

== Politics ==
An incident involving a fictitious write-in candidacy occurred in the town in 1967. A company ran a series of campaign-themed advertisements for a foot powder called Pulvapies. Some of the slogans used included "Vote for any candidate, but if you want well-being and hygiene, vote for Pulvapies", and "For Mayor: Honorable Pulvapies." The foot powder Pulvapies ended up receiving the most votes in the election. A followup story from United Press International said: "Reports that Pulvapies had been elected mayor of the coastal town of Picoaza were not true. The election in the town was for municipal councilmen, not for mayor."; the problem had arisen from the nationwide distribution of distributing advertising flyers that were "the same size and color as the official ballots", and an estimated 10,000 had been turned in at ballot boxes in place of the ballots with multiple candidates, mostly in Quito and Guayaquil.
