= Daule =

Daule may refer to:

== Locations in Ecuador ==
- Daule Canton
- Daule, Esmeraldas
- Daule, Guayas
- Daule River

== Other ==
- Daule (meteorite)
