= Diocese of Daule =

Latin Catholic territory in Ecuador

Diocese of Daule Dioecesis Daulensis
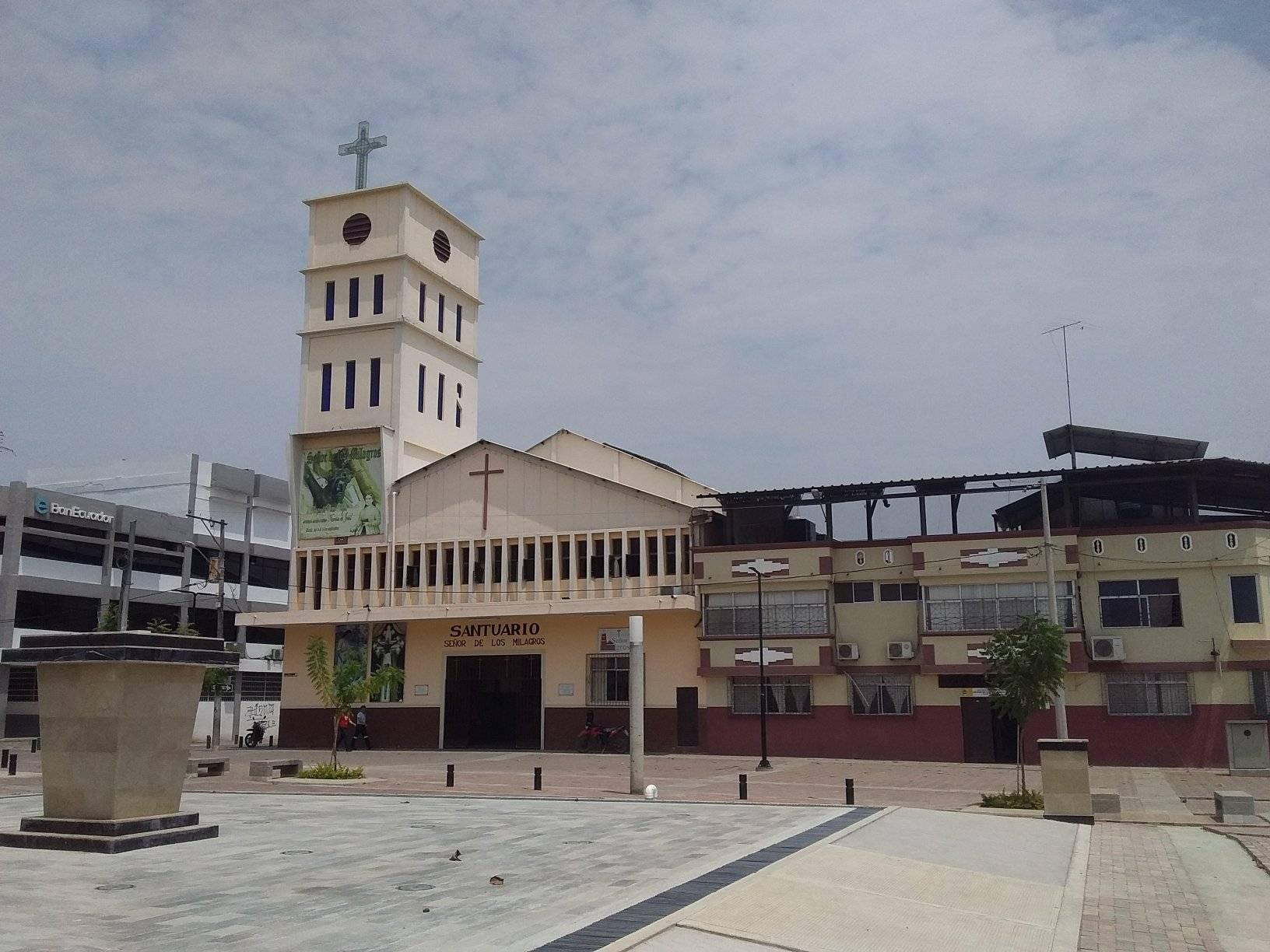
- Cathedral of the Lord of Miracles in Daule

Location
- Country: Ecuador
- Ecclesiastical province: Guayaquil

Statistics
- Area: 5,992.33 km^{2} (2,313.65 sq mi)
- Population: Total; Catholics: (as of 2022); 471,000; 395,000 (83,8%)
- Parishes: 27

Information
- Denomination: Catholic Church
- Sui iuris church: Latin Church
- Rite: Roman Rite
- Established: 2 February 2022 (3 years ago)
- Cathedral: Cathedral of the Lord of Miracles in Daule

Current leadership
- Pope: Leo XIV
- Bishop: Krzysztof Kudławiec
- Bishops emeritus: Giovanni Battista Piccioli

The Roman Catholic Diocese of Daule (Latin: Dioecesis Dualensis) is a Latin Church ecclesiastical jurisdiction or diocese of the Catholic Church located in the city of Daule, Ecuador. It is a suffragan diocese in the ecclesiastical province of metropolitan Guayaquil in Ecuador.

== Diocese ==
The diocese covers an area of the 12 cantons in the Guayas Province: Daule, Balzar, Colimes, El Empalme, Isidro Ayora, Lomas de Sargentillo, Nobol, Palestina, Pedro Carbo, Samborondón, Santa Lucía and Salitre.

It is divided into 27 parishes and had 28 diocesan priests in 2022.

== History ==
On 2 February 2022, Pope Francis established the Diocese of Daule, when it was split off from the Archdiocese of Guayaquil.

As its first ordinary he named Giovanni Battista Piccioli, auxiliary bishop of Guayaquil. His installation was scheduled for 31 March. On 17 March 2022, Pope Francis accepted Piccioli's resignation and named Luis Cabrera Herrera, Archbishop of Guayaquil, apostolic administrator.

== Ordinaries ==
- Giovanni Battista Piccioli (2 February 2022 – 17 March 2022)

Luis Cabrera Herrera, apostolic administrator (17 March 2022 – 25 June 2022)

- Krzysztof Kudławiec (since 22 April 2022)

== See also ==
- Roman Catholicism in Ecuador
