= Highways in Ecuador =

Road map of Ecuador (Spanish).

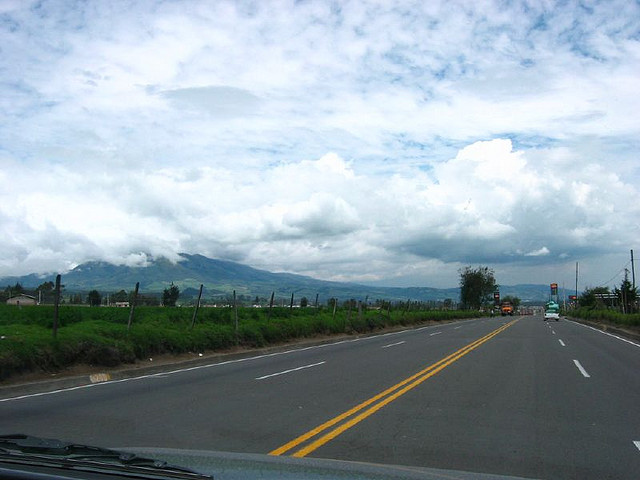
Highway in Cashapamba, Pichincha. Part of E35.

The primary highways of Ecuador are designated with both a name and an alphanumeric designation. The highway designations begin with the letter E followed by a number on a shield that looks like the ones of the USA interstate highways.

If the highway is a trunk highway (travelling north to south), the number is odd. They are numbered from smallest to largest from the west to the east.

If the highway is a transverse highway (travelling east to west), the number is even. They are numbered from smallest to largest from the north to the south.

== Primary highways ==
=== Trunk highways ===
Shield	Number	Name	Symbol	Route	Length
	E5	Troncal Insular (Insular Trunk)	tortoise	Baltra - Puerto Ayora	38 km
	E15	Troncal del Pacífico (Pacific Trunk)	dolphin	Colombia - Esmeraldas - Salinas	741 km
	E25	Troncal de la Costa (Coastal Trunk)	butterfly	San Miguel de los Bancos - Guayaquil - Peru	664 km
	E25A	Troncal de la Costa Alterna (Alternate Coastal Trunk)	-	in Santo Domingo de los Tsáchilas	10 km
	E35	Troncal de la Sierra (Highland Trunk); The Ecuadorian part of the Pan-American Highway	condor	Colombia - Quito - Peru	781 km
	E45	Troncal Amazónica (Amazon Trunk)	toucan	Colombia - Puyo - Macas - Zamora	701 km
	E45A	Troncal Amazónica Alterna (Alternate Amazon Trunk)	-	Nueva Loja - Cotundo	85 km

=== Transversal highways ===
Shield	Number	Name	Symbol	Route	Length
	E10	Transversal Fronteriza (Frontier Transverse)	jaguar	San Lorenzo - Ibarra - Nueva Loja - Colombia	453 km
	E20	Transversal Norte (North Transverse)	monkey	Esmeraldas - Quito - Puerto Francisco de Orellana	336 km
	E30	Transversal Central (Central Transverse)	parrot	Manta - Puyo	438 km
	E40	Transversal Austral (Southern Transverse)	hummingbird	Salinas - Guayaquil - Puerto Morona	649 km
	E50	Transversal Sur (South Transverse)	anteater	Peru - Zamora	224 km

== Secondary highways ==
Shield	Number	Name	Route	Length
	E28	Vía Colectora Quito-La Independencia	Quito - La Independencia	187 km
	E28A	Vía Colectora Quito-Tambillo	Quito - Tambillo	20 km
	E28B	Vía Colectora Quito-Cayambe	Quito - Cayambe	60 km
	E28C	Vía Colectora Quito-Pifo	Quito - Pifo	15 km
	E38	Vía Colectora Santo Domingo-Rocafuerte	Santo Domingo de Los Tsáchilas - Rocafuerte	200 km
	E39	Vía Colectora Rocafuerte-El Rodeo	Rocafuerte - El Rodeo	20 km
	E46	Vía Colectora Guamote-Macas	Guamote - Macas	70 km
	E47	Vía Colectora El Triunfo-Alausí	El Triunfo - Alausí	190 km
	E48	Vía Colectora Guayaquil-El Empalme	Velasco Ibarra - Guayaquil	143 km
	E49	Vía Colectora Durán-T de Milagro	Milagro - Durán	35 km
	E49A	Vía Colectora Durán-km 27	Guayaquil - Durán - Naranjal	10 km
	E58	Vía Colectora La Troncal-Puerto Inca	Puerto Inca - La Troncal	27 km
	E59	Vía Colectora Cumbe-Y de Corralitos	Machala - Cumbe	144 km
	E68	Vía Colectora Alamor-El Empalme	Alamor - El Empalme	46 km
	E69	Vía Colectora Catamayo-Macará	Catamayo - Macará	147 km
	E182	Vía Colectora Maldonado-Tulcán	Maldonado - Tulcán	45 km
	E282	Vía Colectora Tabacundo-Cajas	Tabacundo - Cajas	10 km
	E283	Vía Colectora Guayllabamba-Santa Rosa de Cusubamba	Guayllabamba - Santa Rosa de Cusubamba	6 km
	E381	Vía Colectora El Salto-Muisne	El Salto - Muisne	10 km
	E382	Vía Colectora T del Carmen-Pedernales	T del Carmen - Pedernales	
	E383	Vía Colectora Y de San Antonio-Bahía de Caráquez	San Antonio - Bahía de Caráquez	60 km
	E383A	Vía Colectora Y de San Antonio-San Vicente	San Antonio - San Vicente	35 km
	E384	Vía Colectora Chone-Pimpiguasí	Chone - El Rodeo	
	E482	Vía Colectora Montecristi-Nobol	Montecristi - Piedrahita	181 km
	E482A	Vía Colectora Guayabal-La Pila	La Pila - Guayabal	10 km
	E483	Vía Colectora Jipijapa-Puerto Cayo	Jipijapa - Puerto Cayo	29 km
	E484	Vía Colectora Palestina-San Juan	Palestina - San Juan	
	E485	Vía Colectora Daule-T de Baba	Daule - Babahoyo	64 km
	E486	Vía Colectora Aurora-T de Salitre	T de Salitre - Guayaquil	51 km
	E487	Vía Colectora La Unión-T del Triunfo	T del Triunfo - Bucay - Cajabamba	
	E488	Vía Colectora Milagro-Bucay	Milagro - Bucay	61 km
	E489	Vía Colectora Posorja-Nobol	Gómez Rendón - Posorja	48 km
	E490	Vía Colectora Riobamba-T de Baños	Riobamba naar T de Baños	30 km
	E491	Vía Colectora Babahoyo-Ambato	Babahoyo - Guaranda - Ambato	209 km
	E492	Vía Colectora Guaranda-Chimborazo	Guaranda - Riobamba	88 km
	E493	Vía Colectora Acceso Norte de Ambato	E30/E35 - Ambato	
	E493A	Vía Colectora Acceso Central de Ambato	E30/E35 - Ambato	
	E493B	Vía Colectora Acceso Sur de Ambato	E35 - Ambato	
	E582	Vía Colectora Cuenca-Puerto Inca	Puerto Inca - Cuenca	119 km
	E583	Vía Colectora Puerto Bolívar-Y del Cambio	Machala - Puerto Bolívar	7 km
	E584	Vía Colectora Pasaje-Y del Enano	Pasaje - Y del Enano	
	E585	Vía Colectora Y de Pasaje-Piñas-Y de Zaracay	Machala - Zaracay	50 km
	E594	Vía Colectora Gualaceo-Gualaquiza	Gualaceo - Gualaquiza	
	E682	Vía Colectora Loja-La Balsa	Loja - La Balsa - Peru	151 km
