= Pichincha =

Pichincha may refer to:

Argentina

- Pichincha, Buenos Aires underground station
- Pichincha, a barrio in the city of Rosario, province of Santa Fe

Ecuador

- Pichincha Volcano, a stratovolcano northern part of the country
- Pichincha Province, in northern Sierra region around the volcano
- Pichincha Canton in Manabí Province
- Pichincha, the capital of Pichincha Canton
- Banco Pichincha, bank in Ecuador

== See also ==
- Battle of Pichincha, 1822, in modern Ecuador
