= Olmedo Canton =

Olmedo Canton may refer to:

- Olmedo Canton, Loja, Ecuador
- Olmedo Canton, Manabí, Ecuador
