= Jama Canton =

- Canton
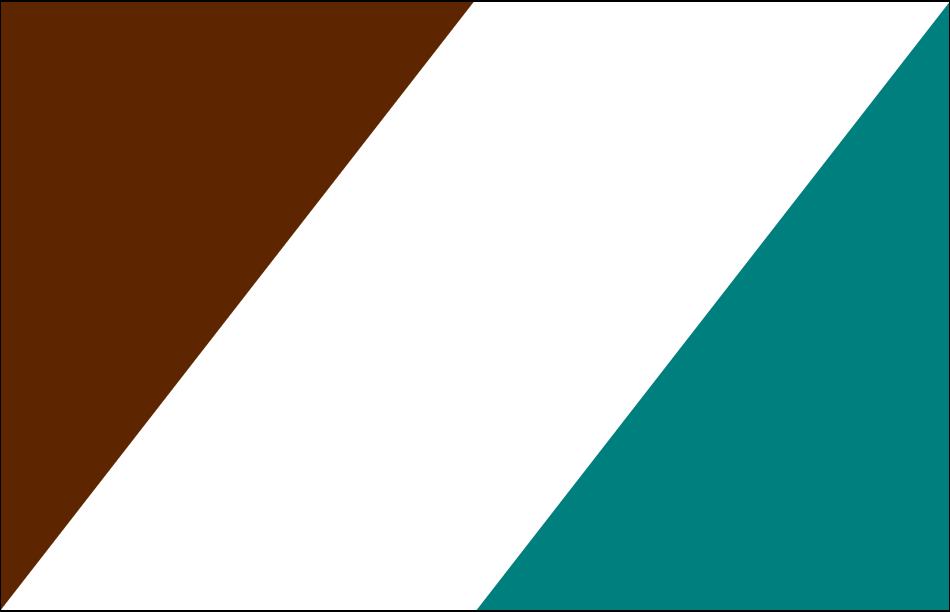
- Flag

- Jama Canton in Manabí Province
- Coordinates: 0.2014°S 80.2659°W
- Country: Ecuador
- Province: Manabí Province
- Time zone: UTC-5 (ECT)

Jama Canton is a canton of Ecuador, located in the Manabí Province. Its capital is the town of Jama. Its population at the 2001 census was 20,230.

== Demographics ==
Ethnic groups as of the Ecuadorian census of 2010:

- Mestizo 72.5%
- Montubio 21.0%
- Afro-Ecuadorian 4.5%
- White 1.7%
- Indigenous 0.2%
- Other 0.1%
