= Guayaquil Municipal Museum =

Coordinates: 2°11′14″S 79°52′57″W

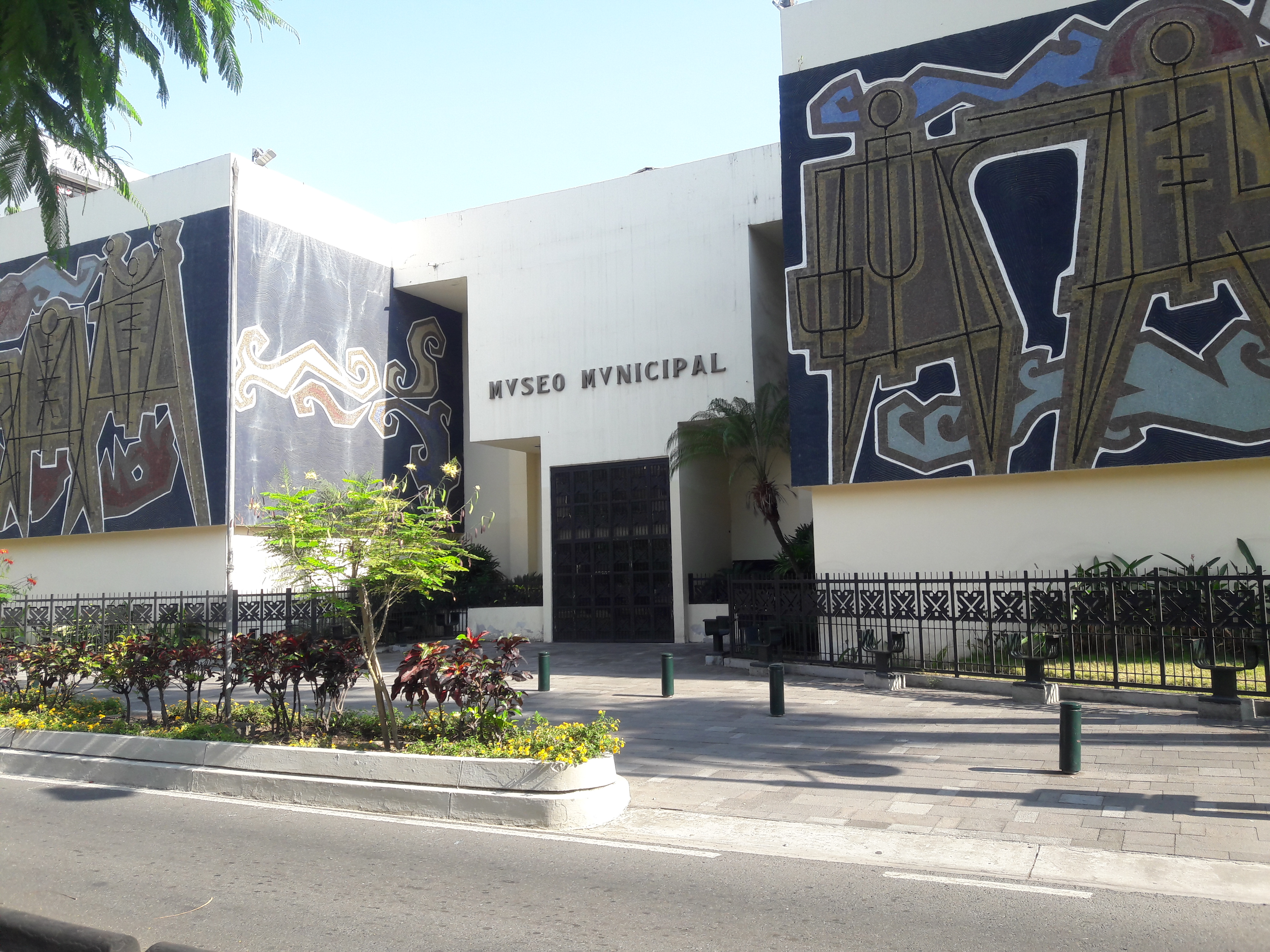
- Type: Art museum
- Website: www.museoarteyciudad.com

Guayaquil Municipal Museum (Spanish: Museo Municipal de Guayaquil) is a museum in Guayaquil, Ecuador. It contains artifacts, objects and historical items relating to the history of Guayaquil. It is considered the most important of the city and one of the best in the country. It is located in the center of the city of Guayaquil, in the same building as the Municipal Library. Admission is free, but passports are required.

== History ==
The museum has its origins in 1863 when an industrial museum was started by the politician and writer Pedro Carbo Noboa, making it the oldest in Ecuador, but it was not until 1908 that the museum was officially founded. The first director was Camilo Destruge Illingworth. The museum has gone through a variety of moves and renovations, acquiring its own building for the first time in 1916.

In 1971 the sculptor Yela Loffredo became the director of the museum. She found exhibits lying on the floor wrapped in newspaper. There was no basement for storage and the lights didn't work. She and her daughter, Tanya Loffredo had to sort things out.

== Exhibits ==
The museum has the following rooms:

- Pre-Hispanic Room: ceramic, metal, and stone objects and handicrafts from the Valdivia, Machalilla and Chorrera cultures
- Colonial Room: includes Spanish firearms, a diorama from the old church of Santo Domingo, the layouts of Guayaquil traced between 1170 and 1772 by Francisco Requena and Ramon Garcia de Leon y Pizarro, and a scale model of the city made by architect Parsival Castro according to a sketch made in 1858 by Manuel Villavicencio"
- Religious Art Room: "an exhibition of mystic scenes comprised by religious paintings from the churches of Guayaquil; icons and archetypes of sacred art, and sculptures crafted by colonial artists like Diego Robles"
- Numismatic Room: coins, particularly the barter system

The museum also has a collection of tsantsas, or shrunken heads.

== Name ==
In 2022 there was a retrospective exhibition of Yela Loffredo's work in "her" museum. The poet and writer Rosa Amelia Alvarado made an open request to the city's mayor to suggest that the Guayaquil Municipal Museum should be renamed after Yela Laffredo.
