= Veinticuatro de Mayo Canton =

- Canton
- Location of Manabí Province in Ecuador

- Veinticuatro de Mayo Canton in Manabí Province
- Coordinates: 1°15′36″S 80°26′24″W
- Country: Ecuador
- Province: Manabí Province

Area
  - Total: 546.6 km^{2} (211.0 sq mi)

Population (2022 census)
  - Total: 31,473
  - Density: 57.58/km^{2} (149.1/sq mi)
- Time zone: UTC-5 (ECT)

Veinticuatro de Mayo Canton is a canton of Ecuador, located in the Manabí Province. Its capital is the city of Sucre. Its population at the 2001 census was 28,294.

== Demographics ==
Ethnic groups as of the Ecuadorian census of 2010:

- Montubio 54.4%
- Mestizo 40.7%
- Afro-Ecuadorian 3.2%
- White 1.6%
- Indigenous 0.1%
- Other 0.1%
