= Paján =

- Town
- Location within Ecuador
- Coordinates: 1°34′12″S 80°25′12″W
- Country: Ecuador
- Province: Manabí
- Canton: Paján Canton

Area
  - Town: 2.56 km^{2} (0.99 sq mi)

Population (2022 census)
  - Town: 7,686
  - Density: 3,000/km^{2} (7,780/sq mi)
- Climate: Aw

Paján is a town in the Manabí province of Ecuador. It is the seat of the Paján Canton.

== Sources ==
- www.inec.gov.ec
