= Tosagua =

- City
- Flag
- Nickname: Corazón de Manabí (The heart of Manabí)
- Location within Ecuador
- Coordinates: 0°46′48″S 80°15′36″W
- Country: Ecuador
- Province: Manabí
- Canton: Tosagua
- City Established: January 20, 1984

Government
  - Mayor: Sra. Elba Gonzalez Alava (2019-2023)

Area
  - City: 4.53 km^{2} (1.75 sq mi)
- Elevation: 18 m (59 ft)

Population (2022 census)
  - City: 11,317
  - Density: 2,500/km^{2} (6,470/sq mi)
- Demonym: Tusaguense
- Area code: +593 5
- Climate: BSh

Tosagua is a city in Ecuador, with a population of 11,317, and the seat of Tosagua Canton. It is located on the river Carrizal in the northwestern part of Manabí Province. Its name comes from the native tribe called The Tosahuas. Founded as a county on January 20, 1984, after approval by Congress and the president of the republic Osvaldo Hurtado Larrea. In the city are the main institutions and organizations Tosagua council. Tasagua Canton has an area of 381.6 square kilometers and is the geographical axis of what is known as the northern part of Manabí.

== Economy ==
It is an area with traditional planting and harvesting a variety of nutritious fruits coastal area, such as cocoa, coffee, banana, cassava, maize, among others.

== Sources ==
- World-Gazetteer.com
