= Yela Loffredo =

Ecuadorian sculptor (1924–2020)

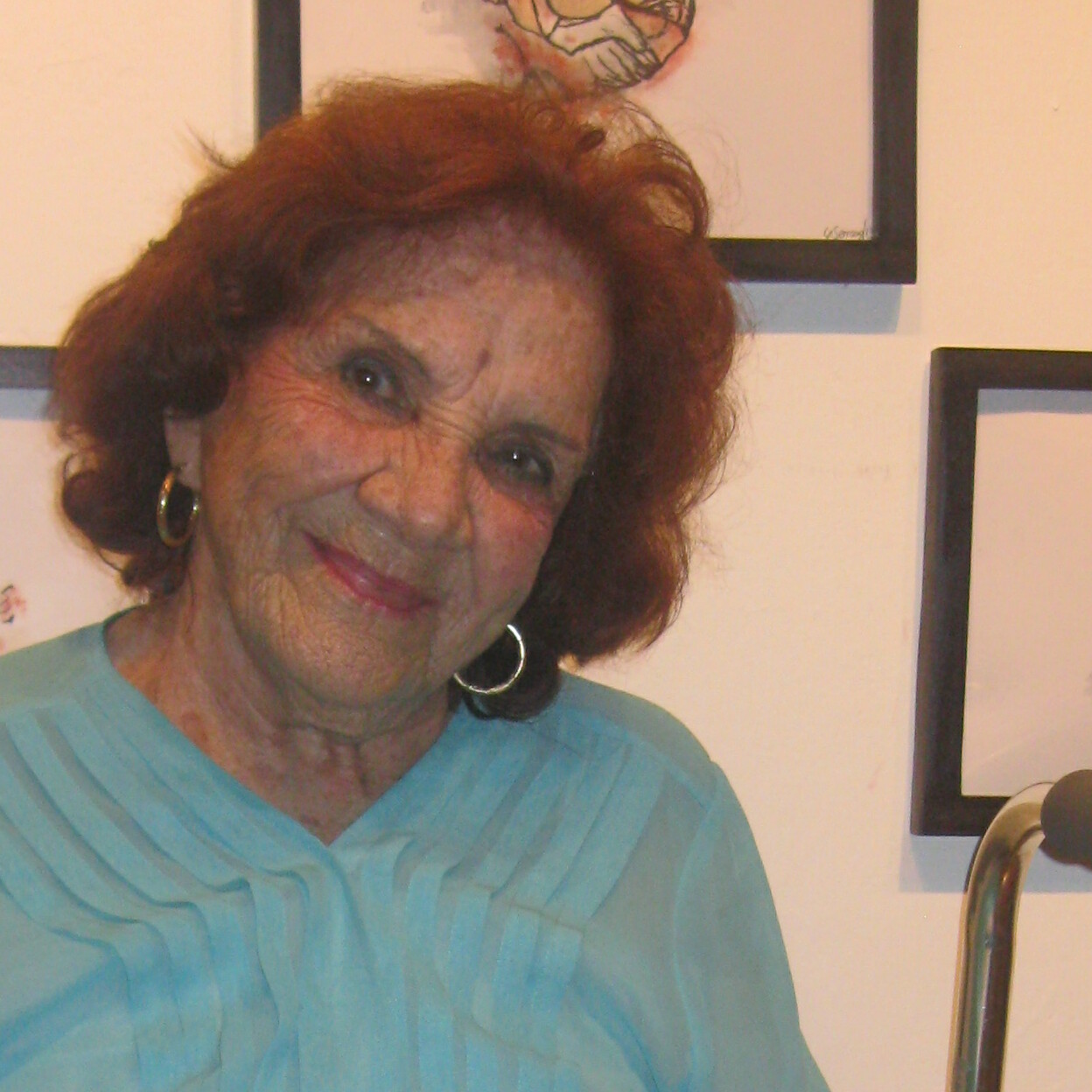
- in 2013
- Born: July 22, 1924; Guayaquil
- Died: May 16, 2020 (aged 95); Guayaquil

Yela Loffredo Rodríguez, later known as Yela de Klein (July 22, 1924 – May 16, 2020) was an Ecuadorian sculptor who directed Guayaquil's museum and led the culture department at Escuela Superior Politécnica del Litoral.

== Life ==
Loffredo was born in Guayaquil in 1924. She was one of the thirteen children of Julia Rodríguez and Salvatore Loffredo. Her father was an Italian emigrant. She would become important to the Las Peñas area and she chose to live her from a short list of two offered by her new husband. In 1942 her mother who was then the head of the family died in the 1942 Ecuador earthquake. She co-founded the Las Peñas Cultural Association in the Guayaquil neighborhood in 1966 after seeing Greenwich Village. Several people were involved including Alfredo Palacio. The founding is celebrated each year on 25 July. Every year for 53 years (until COVID) there was an exhibition and the first was outside her house.

In 1971 she became the director of Guayaquil's municipal museum. She found exhibits lying on the floor wrapped in newspaper. There was no basement for storage and the lights didn't work. She and her daughter, Tanya Loffredo, sorted things out.

She led the cultural department of the Escuela Superior Politécnica del Litoral (ESPOL) for 32 years starting in 1979. In 1999 he was awarded the Eugenio Espejo National Prize for Culture.

== Death and legacy ==
Loffredo died in Guayaquil in 2020. One source says she was aged 99. Her statue Venus de Valdiviais in Guayaquil's Parque Lineal del Salado.

In 2022 there was a retrospective exhibition of her work in "her" museum. The poet and writer Rosa Amelia Alvarado made an open request to the city's mayor to suggest that the Guayaquil Municipal Museum should be renamed after Yela Loffredo.
