= Jama, Ecuador =

Jama
- Town
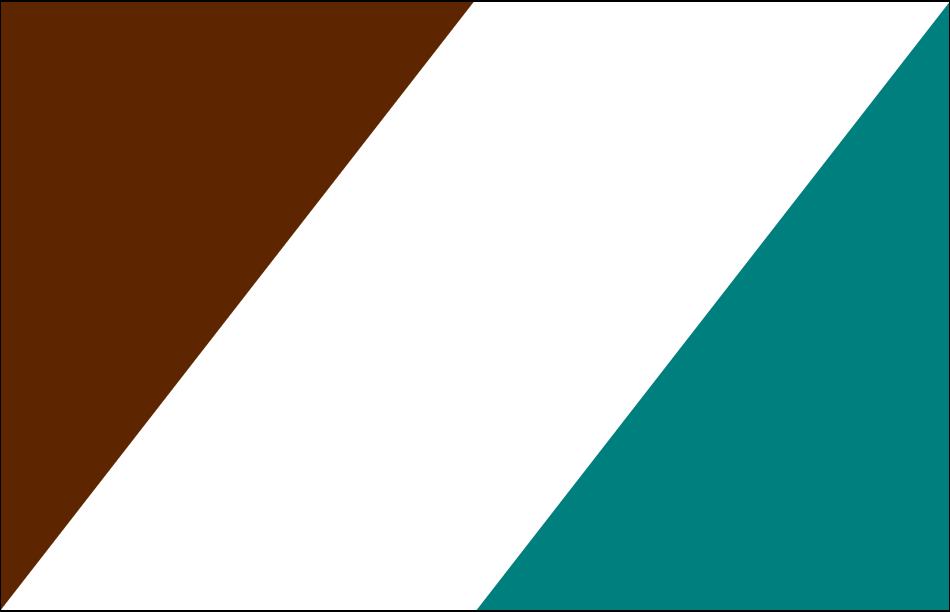
- Flag

- Location within Ecuador
- Coordinates: 0°12′11″S 80°15′47″W
- Country: Ecuador
- Province: Manabí
- Canton: Jama

Population (2010)
  - Total: 6,090
- Time zone: UTC-5 (ECT)

Jama is a city in Ecuador, capital of Jama Canton, in the northwest of Manabí Province. It is located at kilometer 371 of Ecuador Highway 15 on the right bank of the Jama River.

== Climate ==
Climate data for Jama, elevation 5 m (16 ft), (1971–2000)
Month	Jan	Feb	Mar	Apr	May	Jun	Jul	Aug	Sep	Oct	Nov	Dec	Year
Mean daily maximum °C (°F)	30.0 (86.0)	30.0 (86.0)	30.2 (86.4)	30.6 (87.1)	29.6 (85.3)	27.9 (82.2)	28.2 (82.8)	28.4 (83.1)	28.0 (82.4)	28.5 (83.3)	28.6 (83.5)	29.3 (84.7)	29.1 (84.4)
Mean daily minimum °C (°F)	21.3 (70.3)	21.6 (70.9)	21.6 (70.9)	21.2 (70.2)	21.2 (70.2)	20.9 (69.6)	20.2 (68.4)	20.0 (68.0)	20.1 (68.2)	20.2 (68.4)	20.2 (68.4)	20.6 (69.1)	20.8 (69.4)
Average precipitation mm (inches)	110.0 (4.33)	134.0 (5.28)	176.0 (6.93)	86.0 (3.39)	43.0 (1.69)	25.0 (0.98)	14.0 (0.55)	7.0 (0.28)	11.0 (0.43)	8.0 (0.31)	6.0 (0.24)	16.0 (0.63)	636 (25.04)
Average relative humidity (%)	82	81	82	83	84	85	84	84	83	82	81	81	83
Source: FAO
