= Liguiqui =

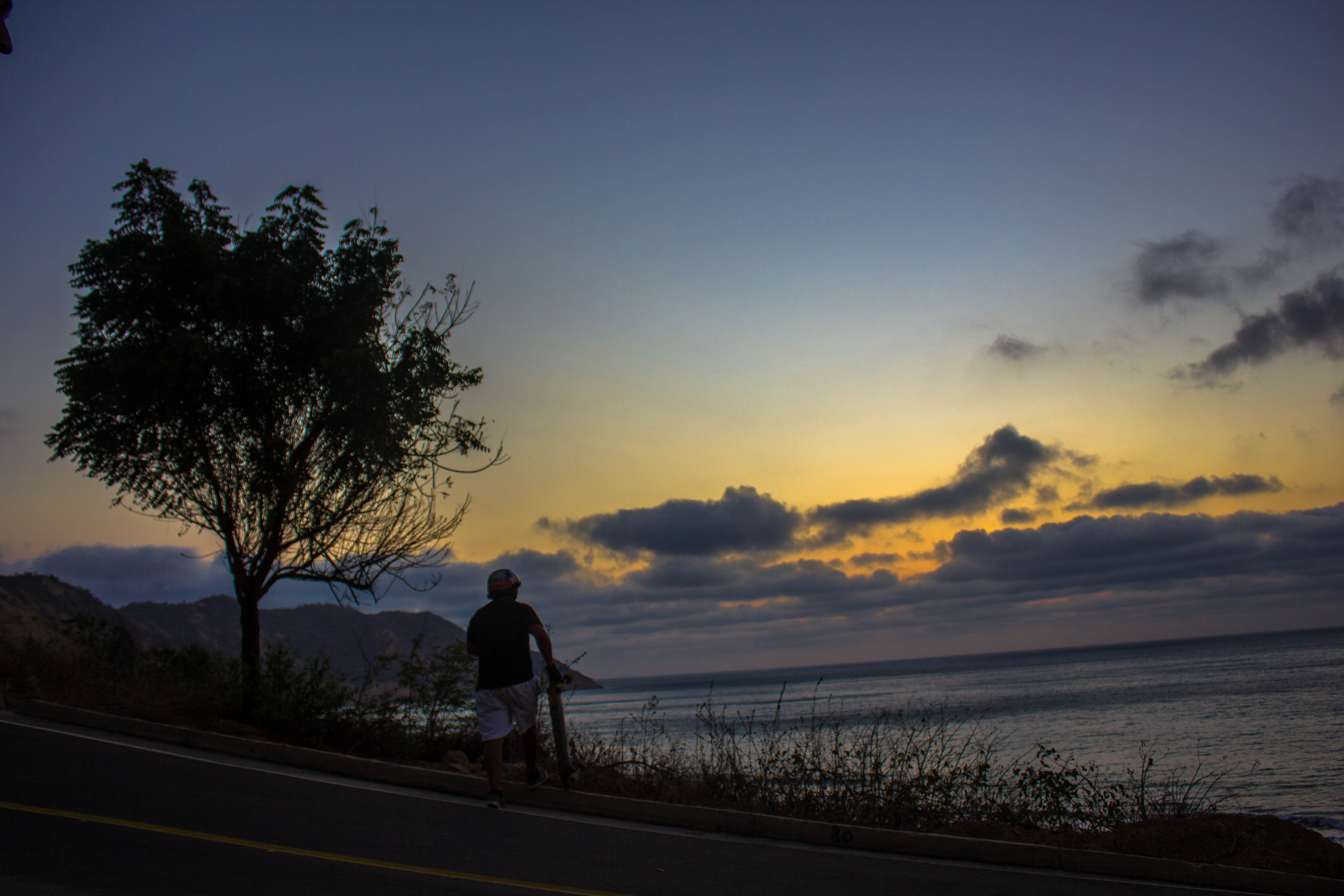
Sunset on the virgin beach of liguiqui

Ligüiqui is a neighborhood of San Lorenzo rural parish in Manta, Manabí, Ecuador, with no more than 100 people, located practically in the middle of the forest in the Ruta del Sol 30 km south of Manta, one of the modern cities with the major port along the central Ecuadorian coast in the province of Manabi, economically, the third most important city of Ecuador.

It is connected by bus from a terminal in Manta located in Calle 8 y Av.1, called Manglaralto or the Costanera line. The approximated time is 35 minutes from the terminal. It takes another 50 minutes of walking, or 5 minutes of driving, to reach the village.

== Weather ==
Liguiqui's climate is consistent, it has two weather seasons, winter and summer, but mostly feels like winter (rain and cold at night). Its average temperature is 26 degrees Celsius, and it undergoes a rainy period from December to May, during which rain falls typically in the evening and at night.

== Sports ==
The practice of sports are minimum, but the presence of Bodyboarding, surfing, scuba diving are significant. Liguiqui have one of the best left-waves (point break) along the Ecuadorian coast. Because of its location, you never see crowd there. Their waves with a good South Swell can reach 9 feet height.

== Economy ==
Its main economic activity is tuna fishing, but some families run small markets at their homes.
