= Troncal =

Troncal may refer to:

- El Troncal Airport, airport located in Arauquita, Columbia
- La Troncal Canton, a canton in Ecuador
- La Troncal, seat of La Troncal Canton in the Cañar Province, Ecuador
- Troncal de la Sierra, official name of Ecuador Highway 35 (E-35), a primary highway in Ecuador. Colloquially known as "La Panamericana"
