= Sucre, Manabí =

Sucre
- Town
- Location within Ecuador
- Coordinates: 1°15′36″S 80°26′24″W
- Country: Ecuador
- Province: Manabí
- Canton: Veinticuatro de Mayo Canton

Area
  - Town: 5.41 km^{2} (2.09 sq mi)

Population (2022 census)
  - Town: 6,607
  - Density: 1,220/km^{2} (3,160/sq mi)
- Climate: BSh

Sucre is a town in the Manabí province of Ecuador. The town owes its name to Marshal Antonio José de Sucre.

== See also ==
- Antonio José de Sucre
