= Manta Canton =

- Canton
- Location of Manabí Province in Ecuador.

- Manta Canton in Manabí Province
- Coordinates: 00°57′00.08″S 80°42′58.32″W
- Country: Ecuador
- Province: Manabí Province

Area
  - Total: 296.3 km^{2} (114.4 sq mi)

Population (2022 census)
  - Total: 271,145
  - Density: 915.1/km^{2} (2,370/sq mi)
- Time zone: UTC-5 (ECT)

Manta Canton is a canton of Ecuador, located in the Manabí Province. Its capital is the city of Manta. Its population at the 2001 census was 192,322.

== Demographics ==
Ethnic groups as of the Ecuadorian census of 2010:

- Mestizo 76.4%
- White 7.8%
- Afro-Ecuadorian 7.8%
- Montubio 7.2%
- Indigenous 0.2%
- Other 0.6%

== See also ==
- Liguiqui
