= Tosagua Canton =

- Canton
- Location of Manabí Province in Ecuador.

- Tosagua Canton in Manabí Province
- Coordinates: 0°46′48″S 80°15′36″W
- Country: Ecuador
- Province: Manabí Province
- Capital: Tosagua

Area
  - Total: 381.6 km^{2} (147.3 sq mi)

Population (2022 census)
  - Total: 42,853
  - Density: 112.3/km^{2} (290.9/sq mi)
- Time zone: UTC-5 (ECT)

Tosagua Canton is a canton of Ecuador, located in the Manabí Province. Its capital is the town of Tosagua. Its population at the 2001 census was 33,922.

== Demographics ==
Ethnic groups as of the Ecuadorian census of 2010:

- Mestizo 59.6%
- Montubio 31.5%
- Afro-Ecuadorian 5.5%
- White 3.3%
- Indigenous 0.1%
- Other 0.1%
