= Ecuador Highway 35 =

Road in Ecuador

Highway 35
- Vía E35
- Highland's Road; Troncal de la Sierra

Route information
- Length: 781.19 km (485.41 mi)
- Component highways: Pan-American Highway

Major junctions
- South end: Macará International Bridge near Macará
- E50 in Velacruz; E45 in Loja; E40 from Nulti to Zhud; E30 from Ambato to Latacunga; E20 near Quito; E10 from Salinas to Julio Andrade
- North end: Rumichaca Bridge near Tulcán

Location
- Country: Ecuador

Highway system
- Highways in Ecuador
| ← E30 | → E38 |

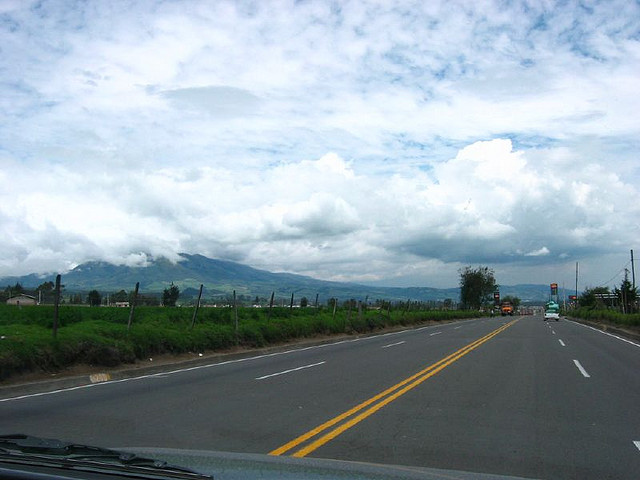
Pan-American Highway in Cashapamba, Pichincha

Ecuador Highway 35 (E-35), officially named "Troncal de la Sierra" (Highland's Road) but colloquially known as "La Panamericana", is a primary highway in Ecuador. This road is Ecuador's portion of the Pan-American Highway. It connects all the cities and towns from the Sierra region, from Tulcán at the north (border with Colombia), passing through Quito, the country's capital, to the south border with Peru. Part of this highway is a toll road administered by Panavial, a private concessionary.
