= Olmedo Canton, Manabí =

Olmedo Canton
- Canton
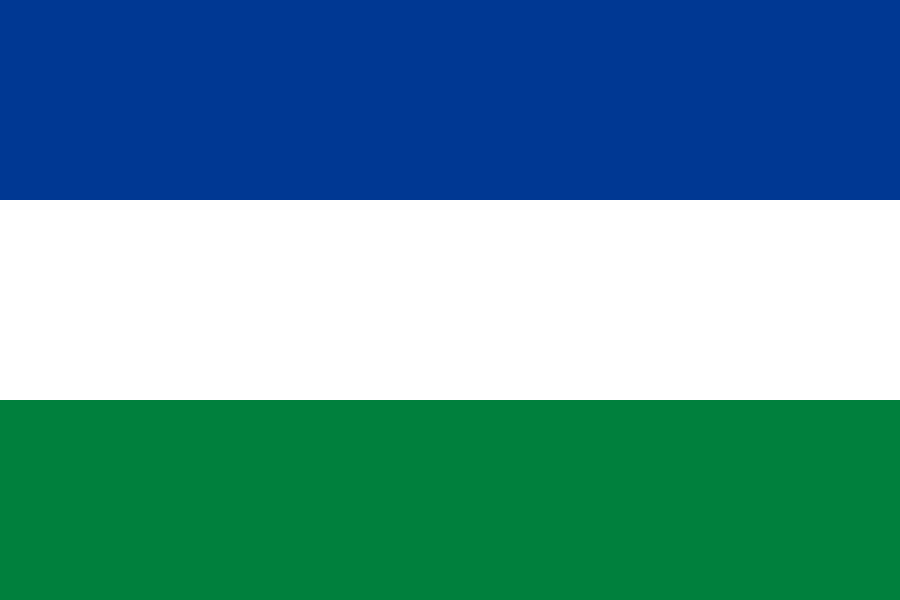
- Flag

- Location of Manabí Province in Ecuador.

- Olmedo Canton in Manabí Province
- Coordinates: 1.396111°S 80.206111°W
- Country: Ecuador
- Province: Manabí Province
- Time zone: UTC-5 (ECT)

Olmedo Canton is a canton of Ecuador, located in the Manabí Province. Its capital is the town of Olmedo. Its population at the 2010 census was 9,844.

== Demographics ==
Ethnic groups as of the Ecuadorian census of 2010:

- Montubio 57.8%
- Mestizo 34.6%
- White 4.1%
- Afro-Ecuadorian 3.4%
- Indigenous 0.1%
- Other 0.1%
