= Ecuador Highway 5 =

Highway in Ecuador

Highway 5
- Vía E5
- Insular Route; Troncal Insular

Route information
- Length: 55.8 km (34.7 mi)

Major junctions
- North end: Seymour Airport on Baltra Island
- South end: El Garrapatero beach on Santa Cruz Island

Location
- Country: Ecuador

Highway system
- Highways in Ecuador
← E682	→ E10

Ecuador Highway 5 (E5) is the westernmost trunk highway in Ecuador. The highway is known as the Insular Route (Spanish: Troncal Insular), and it runs entirely within the Galápagos Islands. E5's northern terminus is on Baltra Island, at the Seymour Airport; its southern terminus on Santa Cruz Island, at El Garrapatero beach.

E5 is the only national highway in the Galápagos Islands and therefore does not intersect any other national highways along its route.

== Route description ==
E5 runs across Baltra Island for 6.6 kilometres (4.1 mi), from Seymour Airport to the Baltra ferry terminal. The highway is carried by the ferry route to Santa Cruz Island. The section on Santa Cruz is 48.6 kilometres (30.2 mi) long, running from the northern tip of the island through the city of Puerto Ayora and intersecting Avenida Padre Julio Herrera. From Puerto Ayora, the highway runs eastward along the Via Playa El Garrapatero to the El Garrapatero beach.
