= Portoviejo Canton =

- Canton
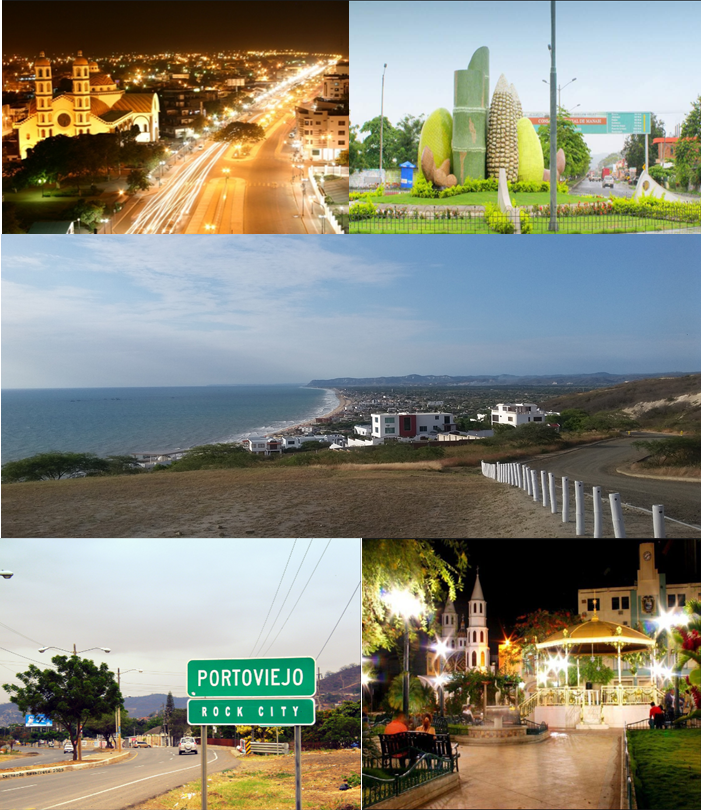

- Location of Manabí Province in Ecuador.

- Portoviejo Canton in Manabí Province
- Coordinates: 1°3′22.25″S 80°27′18.78″W
- Country: Ecuador
- Province: Manabí Province

Area
  - Total: 957.3 km^{2} (369.6 sq mi)

Population (2022 census)
  - Total: 322,925
  - Density: 337.3/km^{2} (873.7/sq mi)
- Time zone: UTC-5 (ECT)

Portoviejo Canton is a canton of Ecuador, located in the Manabí Province. Its capital is the city of Portoviejo. Its population at the 2001 census was 238,430.

== Demographics ==
Ethnic groups as of the Ecuadorian census of 2010:

- Mestizo 67.9%
- Montubio 20.8%
- White 5.7%
- Afro-Ecuadorian 5.3%
- Indigenous 0.2%
- Other 0.2%
