= Matilde Esther =

Former territory of Ecuador

Matilde Esther was a non-delimited territory of Ecuador situated between the provinces of Los Ríos, Guayas and Bolívar. It was incorporated into the Guayas Province by the decree issued by President Rafael Correa in 2017.
