= Vicente Amador Flor =

Ecuadorian poet

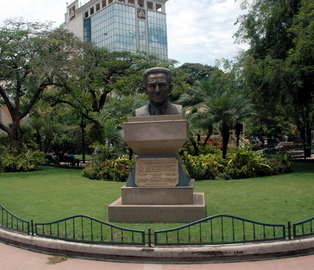
- Bust statue of Flor in the central park of Portoviejo, Ecuador
- Born: Vicente Amador Flor Cedeño; July 19, 1902; Portoviejo, Ecuador
- Died: December 3, 1975 (aged 73)
- Occupation: Poet
- Spouse: Clorinda Sacoto
- Writing career
- Notable works: "Canto a Portoviejo", "Atardecer", "Advenimiento de Portoviejo"

Vicente Amador Flor Cedeño (July 19, 1903 - December 3, 1975) was an Ecuadorian poet known for his poems about his native city Portoviejo.

== Biography ==
His parents were Efrén Flor Guerrero and Julia María Cedeño de Flor. He attended the colegio "Olmedo" (Olmedo high school) but dropped out before graduating.

Flor had six children with his wife Clorinda Sacoto.

The central park of Portoviejo has borne his name since October 30, 1981, and many educational institutions in Ecuador bear his name. A bust statue of Flor was placed in the central park of Portoviejo in 1983.

== Awards ==
- First Prize of the Primeros Juegos Florales for his poem 'Romanza de ausencia' (1923)
- "Lira de Oro" for his poem "Canto a Manta" (1931)
- First Prize in the "Poems To Mother" Contest (1948)
- "Medalla de Oro" by the city of Portoviejo (1953)
- "Condecoración Nacional Al Mérito en el Grado de Comendador" by the government of Ecuador (1962)

== Works ==
His popular poems include:

- "Canto a Portoviejo"
- "Atardecer"
- "Advenimiento de Portoviejo"

His books include:

- "Romanza de la Ausencia"
- "Motivos de Ayer y de Hoy"
- "Cuatro Voces de la Poesía Manabita"
- "Antología Poética"
