= El Piedrero =

Coordinates: 2°20′S 79°17′W

El Piedrero was a non-delimited territory of Ecuador situated between the provinces of Guayas and Cañar. It was incorporated into the Guayas Province by the decree issued by President Rafael Correa in 2017.
