= Rocafuerte Canton =

- Canton
- Location of Manabí Province in Ecuador.

- Rocafuerte Canton in Manabí Province
- Coordinates: 0°55′12″S 80°27′36″W
- Country: Ecuador
- Province: Manabí Province
- Capital: Rocafuerte

Area
  - Total: 278.8 km^{2} (107.6 sq mi)

Population (2022 census)
  - Total: 42,688
  - Density: 153.1/km^{2} (396.6/sq mi)
- Time zone: UTC-5 (ECT)

Rocafuerte Canton is a canton of Ecuador, located in the Manabí Province. Its capital is the town of Rocafuerte. Its population at the 2001 census was 29,321.

== Demographics ==
Ethnic groups as of the Ecuadorian census of 2010:

- Mestizo 64.7%
- Montubio 29.4%
- Afro-Ecuadorian 3.1%
- White 2.6%
- Indigenous 0.1%
- Other 0.1%
