= Paján Canton =

- Canton
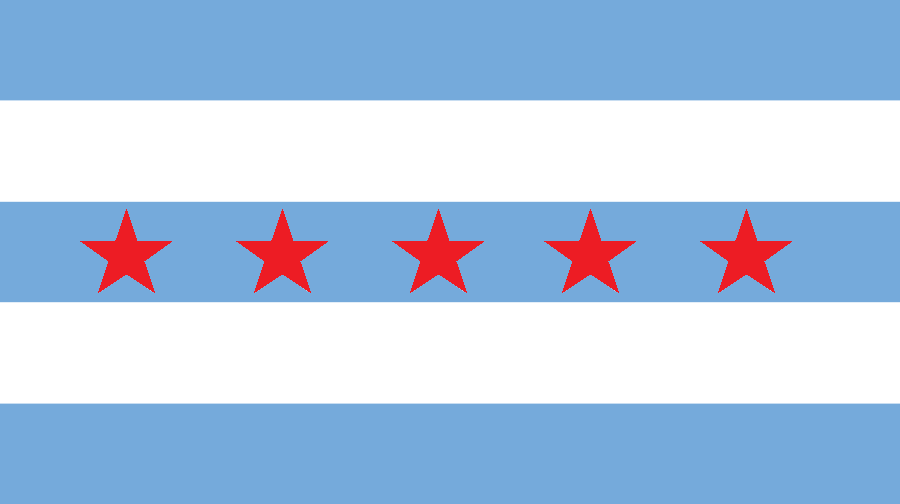
- Flag

- Location of Manabí Province in Ecuador.

- Paján Canton in Manabí Province
- Coordinates: 1°34′12″S 80°25′12″W
- Country: Ecuador
- Province: Manabí Province

Area
  - Total: 1,100 km^{2} (420 sq mi)

Population (2001)
  - Total: 41,879
  - Density: 38/km^{2} (99/sq mi)
- Time zone: UTC-5 (ECT)

Paján Canton is a canton of Ecuador, located in the Manabí Province. Its capital is the town of Paján. Its population at the 2001 census was 35,952.

== Demographics ==
Ethnic groups as of the Ecuadorian census of 2010:

- Montubio 49.4%
- Mestizo 46.3%
- Afro-Ecuadorian 2.1%
- White 2.1%
- Indigenous 0.1%
- Other
