= Pichincha, Ecuador =

Pichincha
- City
- Location within Ecuador
- Coordinates: 1.04789°S 79.81984°W
- Country: Ecuador
- Province: Manabi
- Canton: Pichincha Canton

Area
  - City: 1.97 km^{2} (0.76 sq mi)

Population (2022 census)
  - City: 4,406
  - Density: 2,240/km^{2} (5,790/sq mi)

Pichincha is a city in Pichincha Canton in the Manabí Province in Ecuador. It is situated along the Daule River.
