= Rocafuerte =

Town in Manabí province, Ecuador

Rocafuerte is a town in the Rocafuerte Canton within the Manabí province of Ecuador.
