= Daule, Guayas =

Daule
- City
- Flag

- Location within Ecuador
- Coordinates: 1°52′S 79°59′W
- Country: Ecuador
- Province: Guayas
- Canton: Daule Canton

Area
  - City: 39.95 km^{2} (15.42 sq mi)

Population (2022 census)
  - City: 161,498
  - Density: 4,043/km^{2} (10,470/sq mi)

Daule, Guayas, Ecuador is a city located in central Guayas, Ecuador, on the Daule River. It is the seat of Daule Canton, created November 26, 1820.

It is called the "rice capital of Ecuador" for its important rice production. In the 2022 census, it had a population of 161,498 which makes it the fourteenth most populous city in the country. It is part of the metropolitan area of Guayaquil, because its economic, social and commercial activity is strongly linked to Guayaquil, being a dormitory city for thousands of people who move to Guayaquil by land daily.

Every September 14 in Daule, people celebrate "El Señor de Los Milagros" festival. That day people go to the church called El Señor de los Milagros and at night to watch fireworks. Daule was the name of the indigenous tribe called Daulis.

On February 2, 2022, Pope Francis erected the new Roman Catholic Diocese of Daule.

== Climate ==
Climate data for Daule, elevation 20 m (66 ft), (1971–2000)
Month	Jan	Feb	Mar	Apr	May	Jun	Jul	Aug	Sep	Oct	Nov	Dec	Year
Mean daily maximum °C (°F)	31.4 (88.5)	31.0 (87.8)	31.4 (88.5)	31.7 (89.1)	30.7 (87.3)	29.4 (84.9)	29.7 (85.5)	29.7 (85.5)	30.8 (87.4)	30.8 (87.4)	31.0 (87.8)	32.2 (90.0)	30.8 (87.5)
Mean daily minimum °C (°F)	20.4 (68.7)	20.3 (68.5)	20.7 (69.3)	20.4 (68.7)	20.2 (68.4)	19.1 (66.4)	18.2 (64.8)	18.4 (65.1)	18.2 (64.8)	19.2 (66.6)	19.1 (66.4)	20.0 (68.0)	19.5 (67.1)
Average precipitation mm (inches)	145.0 (5.71)	204.0 (8.03)	230.0 (9.06)	152.0 (5.98)	57.0 (2.24)	2.0 (0.08)	1.0 (0.04)	1.0 (0.04)	10.0 (0.39)	3.0 (0.12)	4.0 (0.16)	44.0 (1.73)	853 (33.58)
Average relative humidity (%)	80	83	84	82	80	79	79	78	76	73	72	71	78
Source: FAO
