= Pichincha Canton =

- Canton
- Location of Manabí Province in Ecuador.

- Pichincha Canton in Manabí Province
- Coordinates: 1.0473°S 79.8186°W
- Country: Ecuador
- Province: Manabí Province
- Capital: Pichincha

Area
  - Land: 1,075 km^{2} (415 sq mi)

Population (2022 census)
  - Total: 30,380
  - Density: 28.26/km^{2} (73.19/sq mi)
- 2022 census
- Time zone: UTC-5 (ECT)

Pichincha Canton is a canton of Ecuador, located in the Manabí Province. Its capital is the town of Pichincha. Its population at the 2001 census was 29,945.

== Demographics ==
Ethnic groups as of the Ecuadorian census of 2010:

- Montubio 57.8%
- Mestizo 38.1%
- Afro-Ecuadorian 2.1%
- White 1.7%
- Indigenous 0.1%
- Other 0.1%
