= Junín Canton =

- Canton
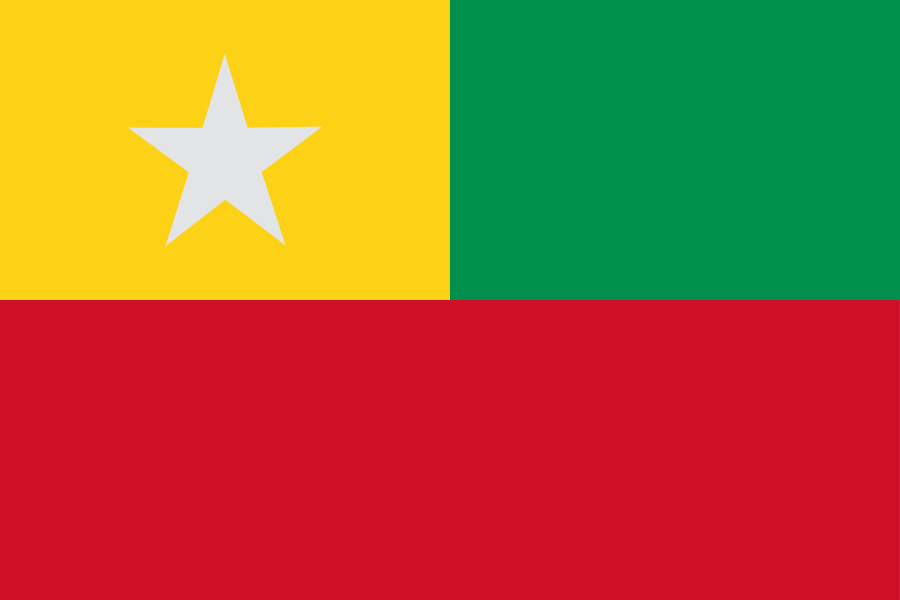
- Flag

- Location of Manabí Province in Ecuador.

- Junín Canton in Manabí Province
- Coordinates: 0.92916°S 80.20569°W
- Country: Ecuador
- Province: Manabí Province
- Time zone: UTC-5 (ECT)

Junín Canton is a canton of Ecuador, located in the Manabí Province. Its capital is the town of Junín. Its population at the 2001 census was 18,496.

== Demographics ==
Ethnic groups as of the Ecuadorian census of 2010:

- Mestizo 71.8%
- Montubio 19.4%
- Afro-Ecuadorian 5.4%
- White 3.4%
- Indigenous 0.0%
- Other 0.1%
