= Portoviejo =

- City
- San Gregorio de Portoviejo
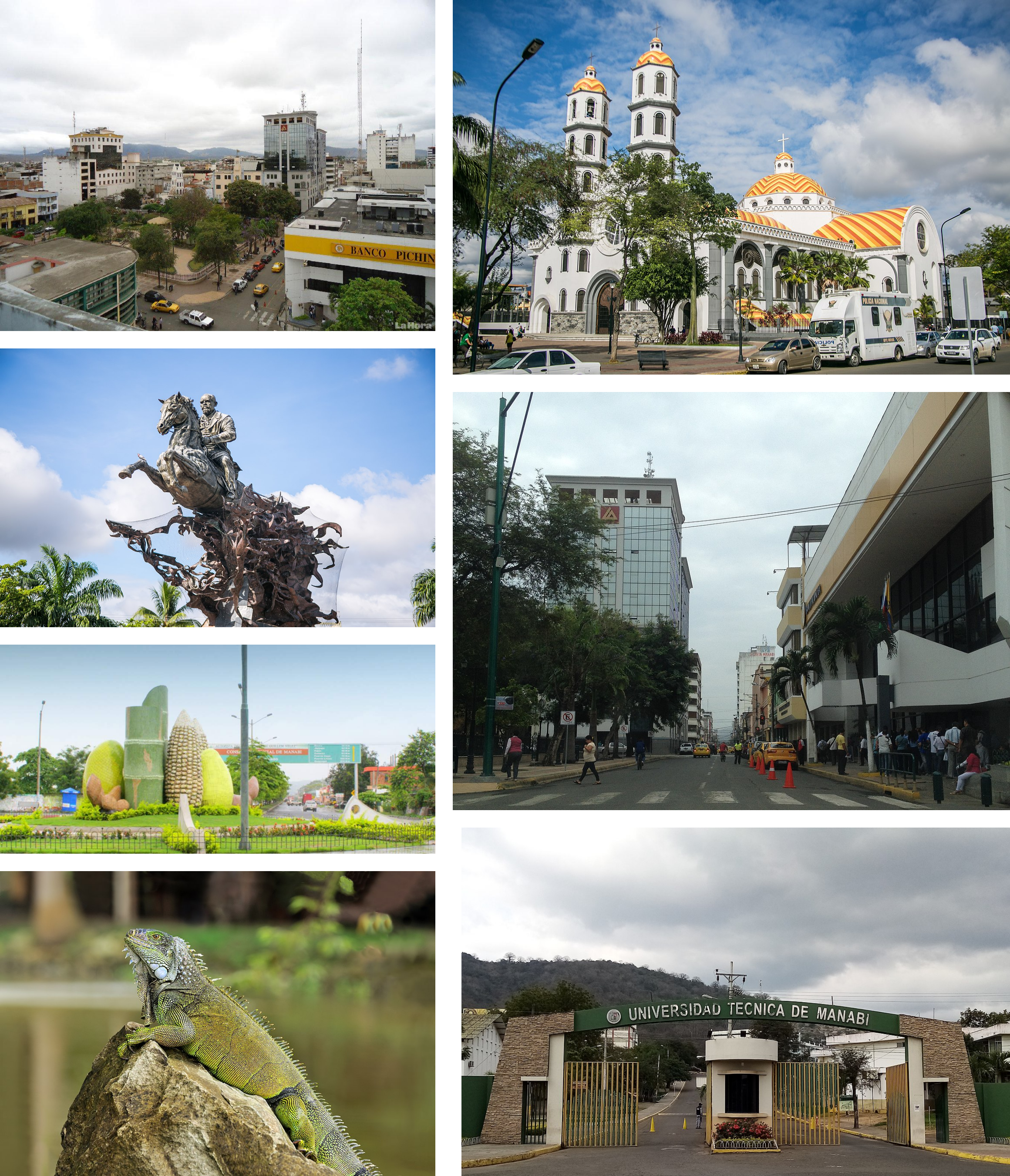
- From top, left to right: Vicente Amador Flor Central Park, Metropolitan Cathedral of Jesus the Good Shepherd, Eloy Alfaro monument, Olmedo street, Manabi Agriculture monument, Portoviejo Botanical Garden and Manabi Technical University.

- Flag
- Motto: Spanish: Portoviejo se Levanta Querer es Poder (English: Portoviejo rises, When there's a will there's a way)
- Location within Ecuador
- Coordinates: 1°3′22″S 80°27′19″W
- Country: Ecuador
- Province: Manabí
- Canton: Portoviejo
- Founded: March 12, 1535
- Founder: Francisco Pacheco
- Urban parishes: List of parishes: 12 de Marzo; 18 de Octubre; Andrés de Vera; Colón; Francisco Pacheco; Picoazá; Portoviejo; San Pablo; Simón Bolívar

Government
  - Mayor: Javier Pincay
  - Vice Mayor: Mariela Coral

Area
  - City: 67.94 km^{2} (26.23 sq mi)
- Elevation: 53 m (174 ft)

Population (2022 census)
  - City: 244,129
  - Density: 3,593/km^{2} (9,307/sq mi)
- Time zone: UTC−5 (ECT)
- Postal code: EC130105
- Area code: 593 5
- ISO 3166 code: EC-M
- Climate: BSh
- Website: www.portoviejo.gob.ec

Portoviejo (Spanish pronunciation: [poɾtoˈβjexo]), also known as San Gregorio de Portoviejo, is a city in Ecuador, and the capital of the Province of Manabí, located about 30 km (19 mi) from the Pacific coast. It is still known as the city of the "Royal Tamarind Trees" due to the former Tamarind plantations in the area.

It serves as the main political and economical centre of the Portoviejo River valley, which also includes the cantons of Santa Ana and Rocafuerte, where about 110 km^{2} (42 square miles) are cultivated every year.

The city, which was affected by economic crisis in the eighties and nineties, is now recovering but severe budget limitations and a huge unemployment rate present difficulties for local authorities.

Founded on March 12, 1535, it is one of the oldest cities in Ecuador and is the eighth largest of the country.

Portoviejo is important for the cultivation of coffee, cattle and fishing and has a thriving agricultural-processing industry, with good road connections to Quito and Guayaquil.

== History ==
Founded March 12, 1535, near the coast, by the Spanish captain Francisco Pacheco as "Villa Nueva de San Gregorio de Portoviejo", it was moved inland to its present site in 1628 due to Indian attacks.

On April 16 and 17, 2016, a large earthquake with a moment magnitude of 7.8 struck the region. Portoviejo sustained over 300 fatalities and building damage.

== Gastronomy ==
The city has a rich agricultural and maritime industry, employing over 50% of the population, as well as a flourishing gastronomic sector. The gastronomic sector is now regarded as the main post-disaster, referring to the 2016 earthquake, cultural industry, providing employment opportunities and reducing poverty for local inhabitants.

In 2018, Portoviejo's gastronomy was declared as intangible heritage of Ecuador, a certificate granted by the Ministry of Culture and Cultural Heritage on October 18, 2018, to commemorate the 198 years of independence of Portoviejo.

In October 2019, the flavor of the Manabi capital was recognized as part of the Creative Cities Network, by the United Nations Educational, Scientific and Cultural Organization (UNESCO). Portoviejo received this recognition when World Cities Day was commemorated, as reported by the Municipal Autonomous Decentralized Government of Portoviejo. The inhabitants of Manabi recover their culture, through gastronomy and the conservation of ancestral recipes; points considered to be part of the Creative Cities, in the Gastronomy category. Portoviejo is the first city in Ecuador to obtain this recognition.

Among the main ingredients used in portovejense food are peanuts, bananas, cheese, corn, and yucca.

A typical meal might consist of Biche de Pescado, Shrimp, Corviche, Bolón de verde, Encebollado, Cebiche de Pollo, Aguado de gallina, or Cangrejada among others.

== Points of interest ==
The many parks within the city include Mamey Ecological Park which includes a large animal reserve, The Forest Park located in the north of the city, and Central Park Vicente Amador Flor.

The city is home to the multi-use stadium Estadio Reales Tamarindos which serves as the home stadium for L.D.U. Portoviejo.

The Jardín botánico de Portoviejo, a preserved area, botanical garden, arboretum, orchid garden, palmetum and rescue area in the northeast of the city serves as a place for leisure, as well as biological and agricultural studies within the Manabí region. It consists of a combined total area of 50 hectars, owned by the Technical University of Manabí, located in Portoviejo.

The Parque Arqueológico Cerro Jaboncillo, an archeological site and museum is located outside of the city.

Situated near the city center on the Av. Universitaria y Olmedot and Alajuela Street is the Metropolitan Cathedral of Jesus the Good Shepherd.

A nearby village, Sosote, is known for its tagua workshops, a traditional Ecuadorian handicraft.

== Education ==
The Technical University of Manabí (UTM) located in Portoviejo, was founded in 1952, having an estimated acceptance rate of 72%. It is locally known as Universidad Técnica de Manabí.

The Private University of San Gregorio Portoviejo is the second university of the city, founded in the year 2000 with an estimated acceptance rate of 51%.

== Transportation ==
The city is located on the E30 road connecting from Manta, Manabí to the capital of the Cotopaxi Province, Latacunga, as well as the 39A.

In 2014, Portoviejo served a bus system of 129 buses on 12 routes throughout the entire city.

The local airport was closed by order of president Rafael Correa in 2011. Currently it is only used for the city's police helicopter operations, as well as for artistic events and trade fairs at Christmas time. In 2016, the airport served as a shelter for those affected by the April 16 earthquake. The nearest currently operating airport, Eloy Alfaro International Airport is instead located in the city of Manta 26 kilometres (16 mi) to the west.

== Geography ==
=== Climate ===
Portoviejo has a hot semi-arid climate (Köppen BSh) with consistently very warm to hot conditions all year round. The advance and retreat of the cold Humboldt Current means there are two seasons: a lengthy dry season from May to December and a short wet season from January to April. The wet season is quite erratic owing to the El Niño Southern Oscillation. in El Niño years rainfall may be several times the long-term mean.

Climate data for Portoviejo, elevation 44 m (144 ft), (1971–2000)
| Month | Jan | Feb | Mar | Apr | May | Jun | Jul | Aug | Sep | Oct | Nov | Dec | Year |
|---|---|---|---|---|---|---|---|---|---|---|---|---|---|
| Mean daily maximum °C (°F) | 30.9 (87.6) | 31.0 (87.8) | 31.6 (88.9) | 31.9 (89.4) | 31.1 (88.0) | 29.7 (85.5) | 29.6 (85.3) | 30.2 (86.4) | 30.6 (87.1) | 30.4 (86.7) | 30.6 (87.1) | 31.2 (88.2) | 30.7 (87.3) |
| Mean daily minimum °C (°F) | 22.0 (71.6) | 22.2 (72.0) | 22.3 (72.1) | 22.3 (72.1) | 21.6 (70.9) | 20.9 (69.6) | 20.3 (68.5) | 19.8 (67.6) | 20.2 (68.4) | 20.5 (68.9) | 20.4 (68.7) | 21.2 (70.2) | 21.1 (70.1) |
| Average precipitation mm (inches) | 92.0 (3.62) | 117.0 (4.61) | 111.0 (4.37) | 60.0 (2.36) | 32.0 (1.26) | 22.0 (0.87) | 3.0 (0.12) | 2.0 (0.08) | 5.0 (0.20) | 3.0 (0.12) | 4.0 (0.16) | 16.0 (0.63) | 467 (18.4) |
| Average relative humidity (%) | 78 | 79 | 80 | 80 | 79 | 80 | 80 | 78 | 77 | 74 | 75 | 73 | 78 |
Source: FAO

== Notable people ==
- Vicente Amador Flor (July 19, 1903 – December 3, 1975), a poet known for writing poems about the city.
- Nathalie Cely (born 28 December 1965), the former Minister of Production of Ecuador and former Ecuadorian Ambassador to the United States.
- Valentina Centeno, Ecuadorian politician
- Lucila Santos Trujillo (1925/1928 – 4 May 2020), former first lady of Ecuador.

== Twin cities ==
- Baracaldo, Spain

== Gallery ==
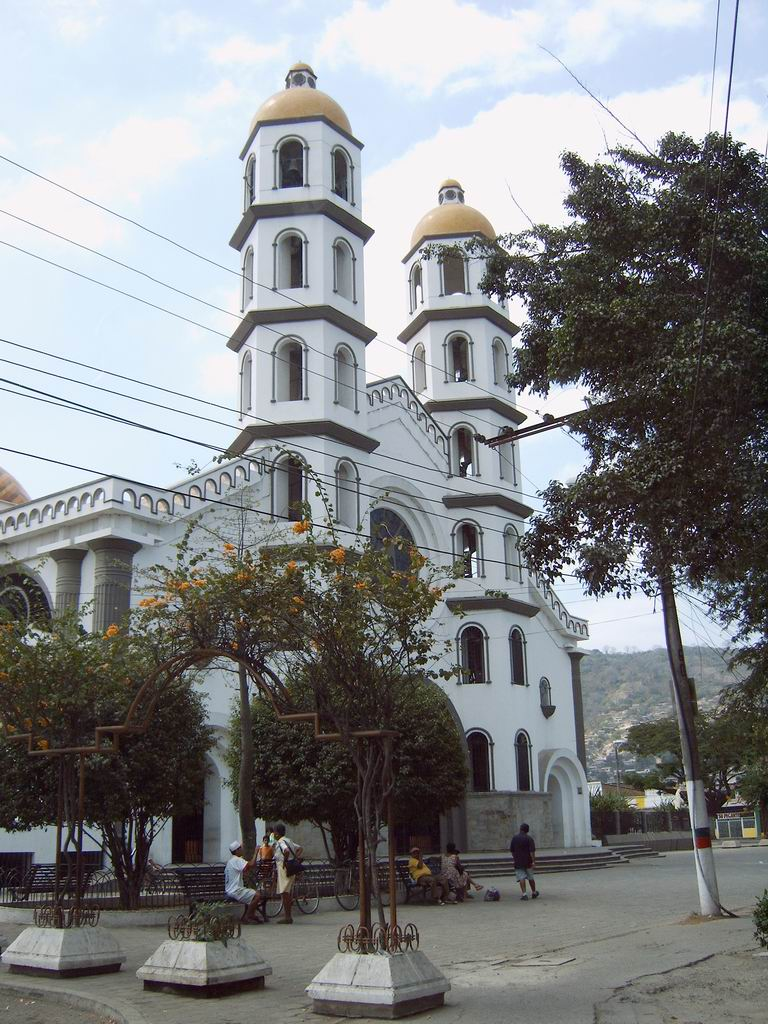
The Catedral Metropolitana de Portoviejo.

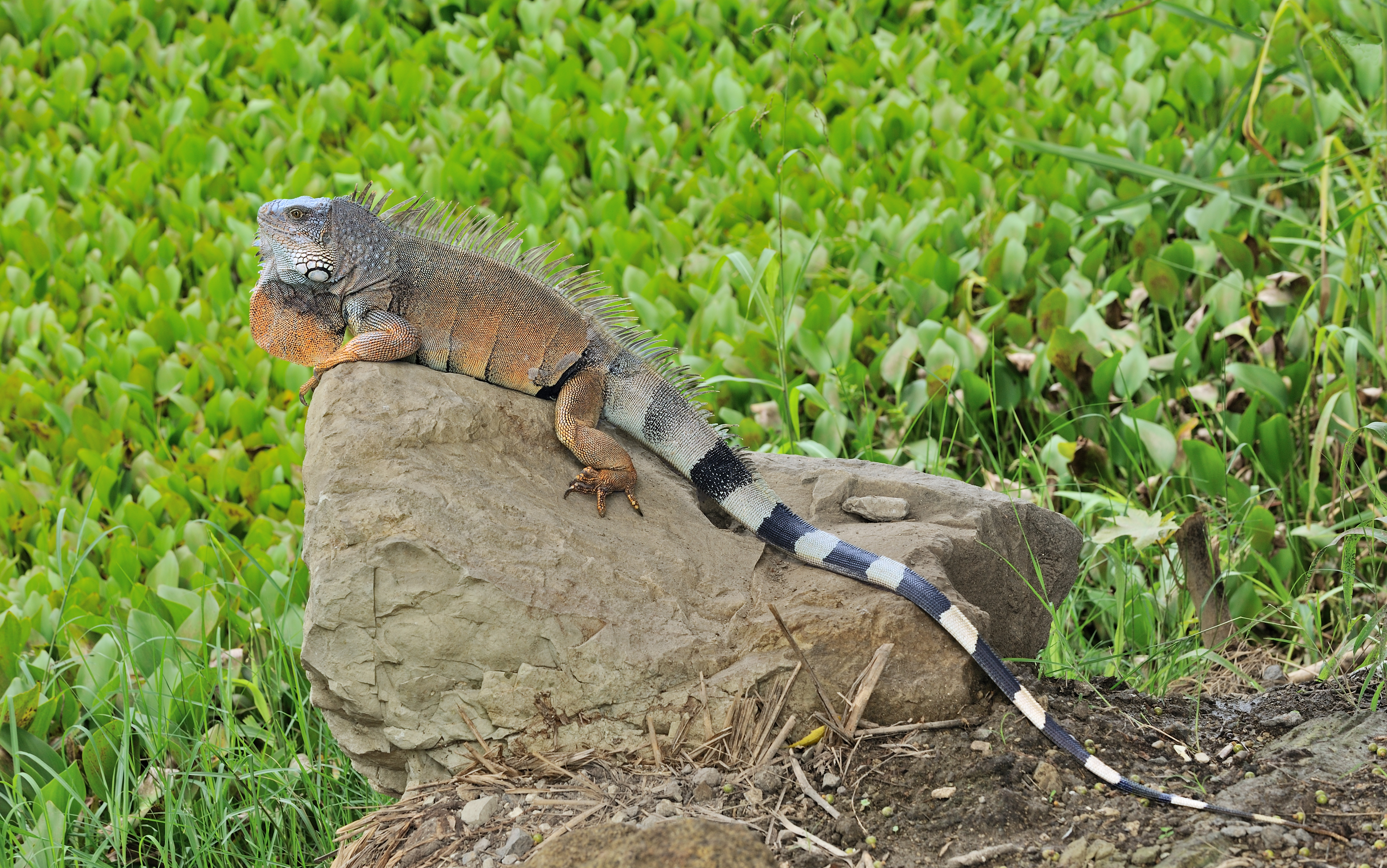
Green Iguana in the Botanical Garden at Portoviejo.

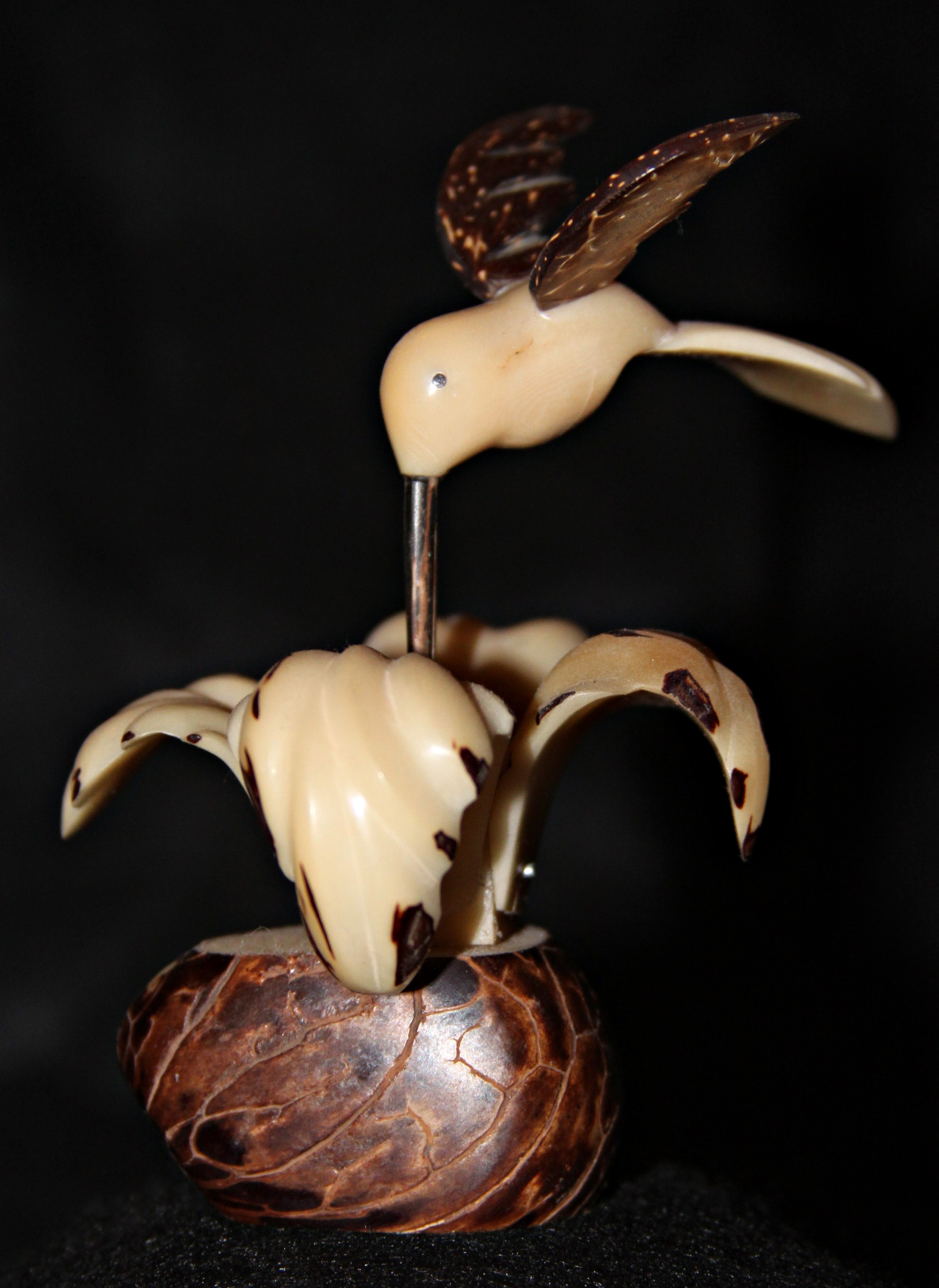
Tagua, Ecuadorian handicraft.

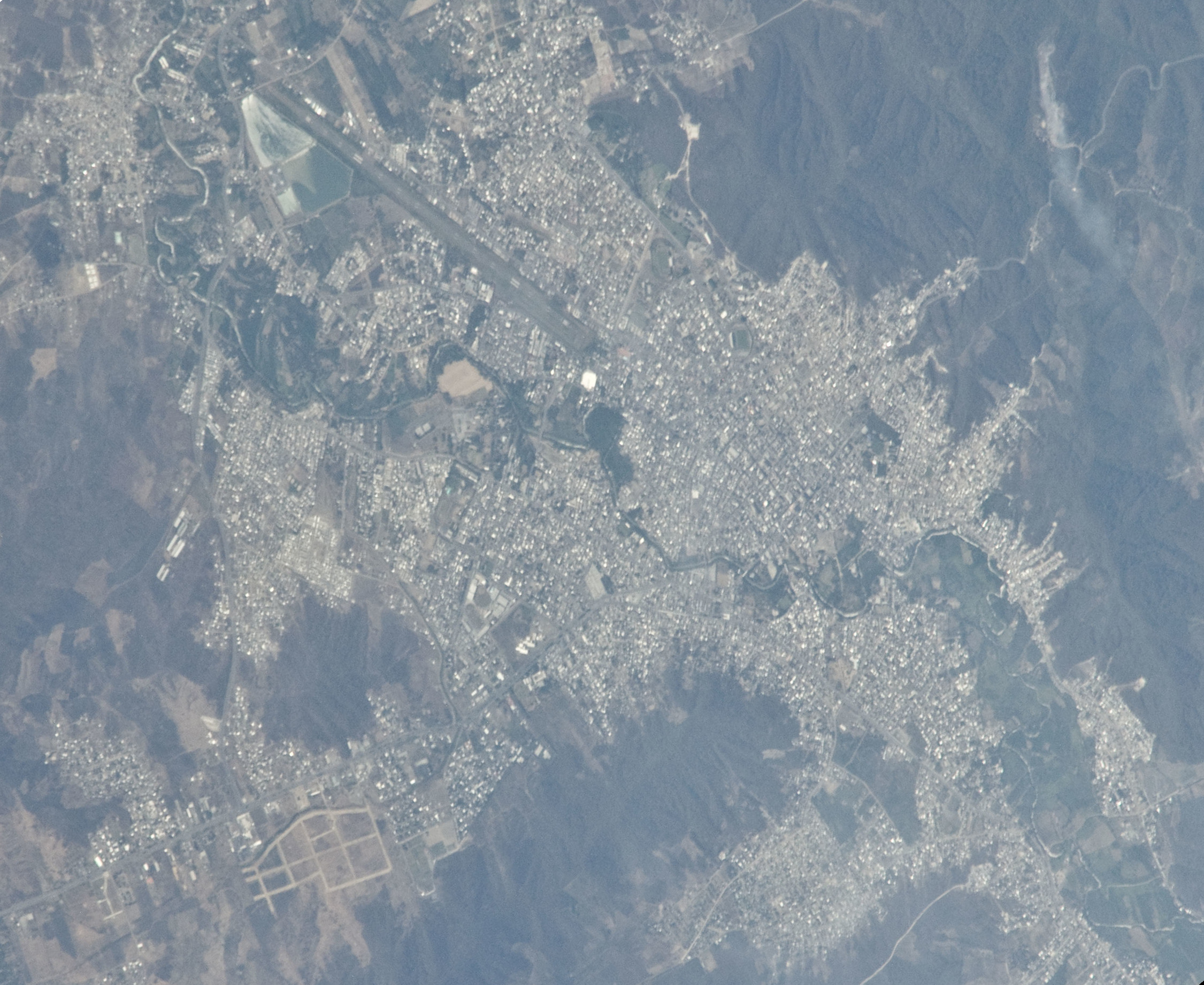
Aerial view of Portoviejo.
