= Daule Canton =

Daule Canton Cantón Daule
- Canton
- Flag

- Location of the Daule Canton within Ecuador.
- Coordinates: 01°52′0″S 79°59′0″W
- Country: Ecuador
- Province: Guayas Province
- Established: 24 June 1824
- Seat: Daule

Area
  - Total: 511.5 km^{2} (197.5 sq mi)

Population (2022 census)
  - Total: 222,446
  - Density: 434.9/km^{2} (1,126/sq mi)
- Time zone: UTC-5 (ECT)
- Website: http://www.daule.gob.ec

Daule, is a canton located in the Guayas province in Ecuador. Created in 1820, it is one of the most important parts of Guayas thanks to its rice production and other products such as corn and eggs.

The Daule canton covers an area of 511.5 square kilometres (197.5 sq mi) and at the 2001 census it had a population of 85,148 people. The seat or capital of the canton is the city of Daule.

== Demographics ==
Ethnic groups as of the Ecuadorian census of 2010:

- Mestizo 51.9%
- Montubio 36.1%
- White 6.4%
- Afro-Ecuadorian 5.2%
- Indigenous 0.2%
- Other 0.3%
