= Ecuador Highway 20 =

Highway in Ecuador

Highway 20
- Vía E20
- North Transversal; Transversal Norte

Route information
- Length: 336.11 km (208.85 mi)

Major junctions
- North end: Esmeraldas
- South end: Puerto Francisco de Orellana

Location
- Country: Ecuador

Highway system
- Highways in Ecuador
← E10	→ E30

Ecuador Highway 20 (E-20), known officially as "Transversal Norte" (North Transversal), is a highway in Ecuador which crosses the provinces of Esmeraldas, Santo Domingo de los Tsáchilas, Pichincha, Napo and Orellana. The E20 is 336-kilometre-long (209 mi).
