= Calceta =

- Town
- Flag
- Motto: Calceta, la sin par (Calceta, the peerless)
- Location within Ecuador
- Coordinates: 0°50′24″S 80°10′12″W
- Country: Ecuador
- Province: Manabí
- Canton: Bolívar Canton
- City Established: October 13, 1913

Government
  - Mayor: Ledy Laura Muñoz

Area
  - Town: 7.05 km^{2} (2.72 sq mi)

Population (2022 census)
  - Town: 20,011
  - Density: 2,840/km^{2} (7,350/sq mi)
- Demonym: Calcetense-Bolivacense
- Time zone: -5GMT
- Postal code: EC130250
- Area code: +593 5
- Climate: Aw

Calceta is a town in the Manabí province of Ecuador. Situated on the banks of the Carrizal river, and surrounded by a valley of the same name, Calceta is a center of trade and services for the north-central zone of Manabí. It has a dozen high schools and more than twenty schools. 3 kilometres away is the Escuela Superior Politécnica de Manabí (ESPAM), a modern agricultural and environmental university.

== Attractions ==
The tower of the Juan Manuel Alava public clock, The Saint Agustín Church, the Civic Square, and the San Bartolo old red bridge, assembled in 1910.

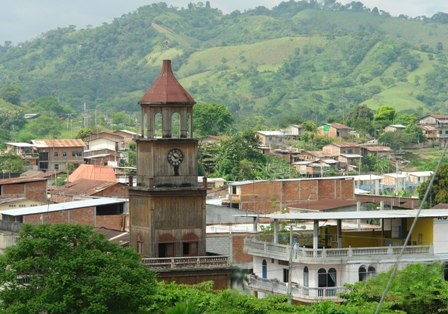
Calceta Clock Tower (Reloj del Publico Calceta)

== Climate ==
Climate data for Calceta, elevation 58 m (190 ft), (1961–1990)
Month	Jan	Feb	Mar	Apr	May	Jun	Jul	Aug	Sep	Oct	Nov	Dec	Year
Mean daily maximum °C (°F)	31.5 (88.7)	31.6 (88.9)	32.0 (89.6)	32.2 (90.0)	31.0 (87.8)	29.7 (85.5)	29.8 (85.6)	30.7 (87.3)	31.3 (88.3)	31.2 (88.2)	31.1 (88.0)	31.6 (88.9)	31.1 (88.1)
Daily mean °C (°F)	26.2 (79.2)	26.2 (79.2)	26.7 (80.1)	26.7 (80.1)	26.2 (79.2)	25.2 (77.4)	24.8 (76.6)	24.8 (76.6)	25.1 (77.2)	25.2 (77.4)	25.3 (77.5)	26.0 (78.8)	25.7 (78.3)
Mean daily minimum °C (°F)	21.7 (71.1)	21.8 (71.2)	22.2 (72.0)	22.0 (71.6)	21.7 (71.1)	20.7 (69.3)	20.2 (68.4)	19.8 (67.6)	20.2 (68.4)	20.6 (69.1)	20.2 (68.4)	20.7 (69.3)	21.0 (69.8)
Average precipitation mm (inches)	190.0 (7.48)	211.0 (8.31)	268.0 (10.55)	148.0 (5.83)	46.0 (1.81)	34.0 (1.34)	12.0 (0.47)	5.0 (0.20)	8.0 (0.31)	6.0 (0.24)	6.0 (0.24)	27.0 (1.06)	961 (37.84)
Source: FAO

== Sources ==
- World-Gazetteer.com
