= Rosa Amelia Alvarado =

Ecuadorian writer

- Born: 1944 (age 80–81); Guayaquil, Ecuador
- Occupation: Writer

Rosa Amelia Alvarado (born 1944, in Guayaquil) is an Ecuadorian writer and poet. She is a member of the House of Ecuadorian Culture as the president of the Núcleo del Guayas, and a member of the Ecuadorian Academy of Language.

== Biography ==
Alvarado studied philosophy and literature in France. In 1964 she founded the Guayaquil-based magazine Hogar, which became the biggest women's magazine line in Ecuador.

From 1967 to 1972, she worked in television as the director of programming at Channel 2 in Guayaquil, specializing in the creation of cultural programs.
