= Manabí Province =

Province of Ecuador

Manabí
- Province
- Province of Manabí
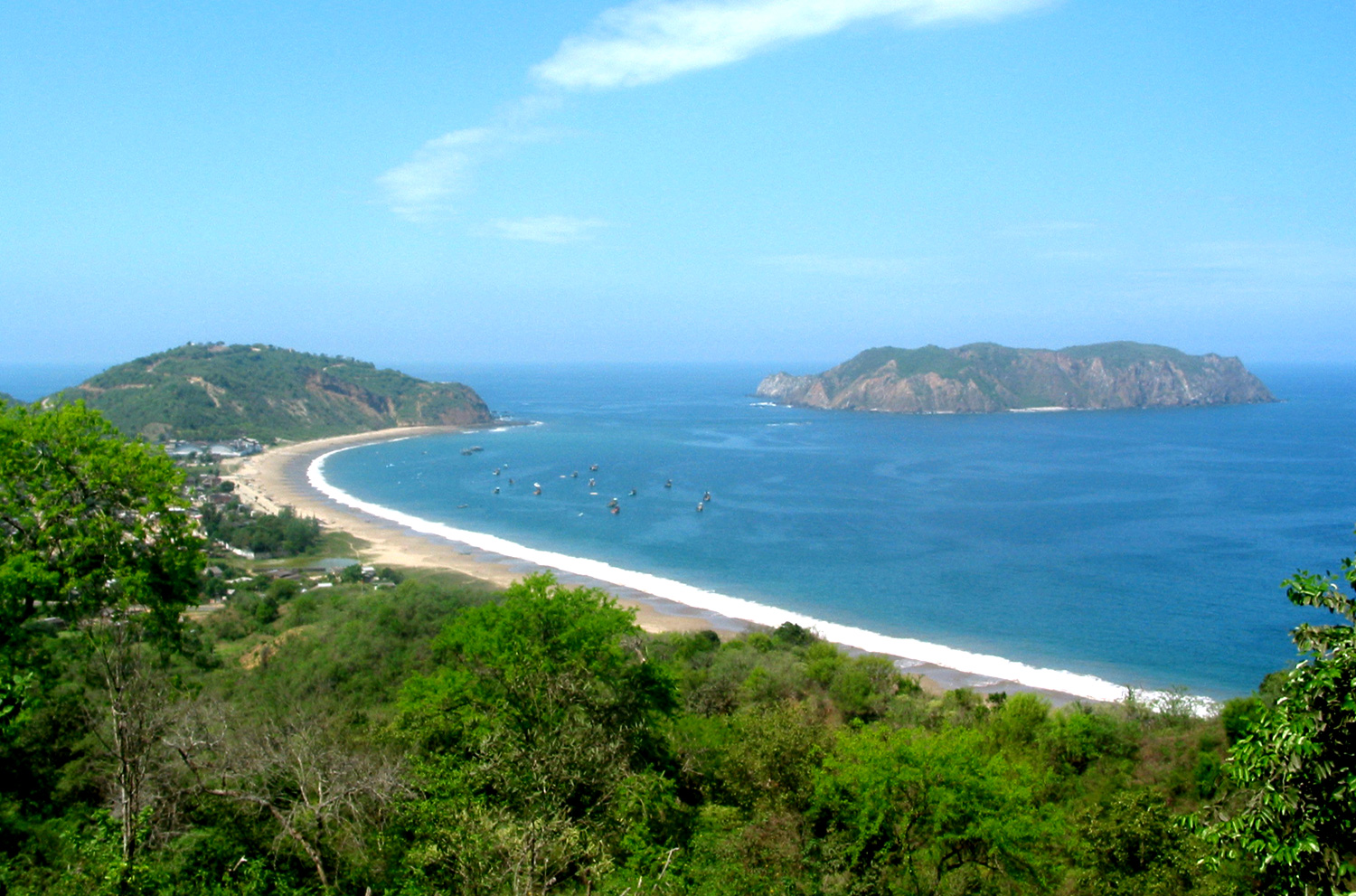
- Image of a beach in Salango, Manabí

- Flag
- Anthem: Himno de Manabí
- Location of Manabí Province in Ecuador.

- Cantons of Manabí Province
- Coordinates: 1.05222°S 80.4506°W
- Country: Ecuador
- Established: June 25, 1824.
- Capital: Portoviejo
- Largest city: Manta
- Cantons: List of Cantons

Government
  - Prefect: Leonardo Orlando (RC)
  - Vice Prefect: Kelly Buenaventura
  - Governor: Aurora Valle Alcívar

Area
  - Province: 19,532 km^{2} (7,541 sq mi)

Population (2022 census)
  - Province: 1,592,840
  - Rank: 3rd in Ecuador
  - Density: 81.550/km^{2} (211.21/sq mi)
  - Urban: 924,325
- Time zone: UTC-5 (ECT)
- Vehicle registration: M
- HDI (2017): 0.733 high · 10th
- Website: www.manabi.gob.ec

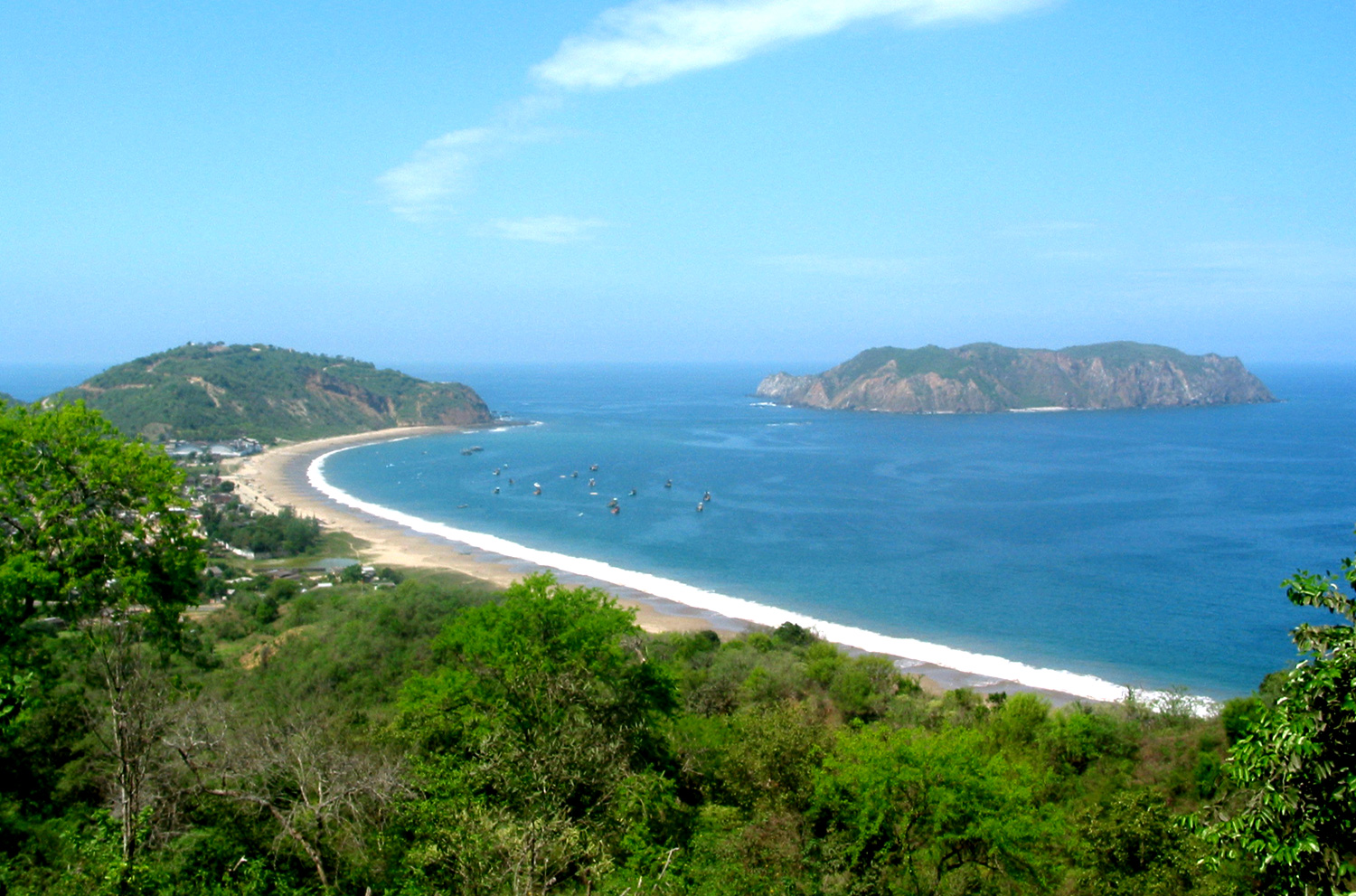
Comuna Salango

Manabí (Spanish pronunciation: [manaˈβi]) is a province in Ecuador. Its capital is Portoviejo. The province is named after the Manabí people.

== Demographics ==
Ethnic groups as of the Ecuadorian census of 2010:

- Mestizo 69.7%
- Montubio 19.2%
- Afro-Ecuadorian 6.0%
- White 4.7%
- Indigenous 0.2%
- Other 0.3%

== Economy ==
The economy of Manabí, a coastal province situated in the western region of the Republic of Ecuador, is deeply entrenched in the cultivation and processing of abundant natural resources and organic products. These commodities, which include but are not limited to cacao, bananas, noble woods, cotton, and seafood, have played a pivotal role in shaping the economic landscape of this region, and continue to serve as primary drivers of its economic growth and sustenance.

Moreover, the industrial sector of Manabí province is founded on the production of tuna, as well as tobacco products, and the manufacturing of agua ardiente, a Spanish brandy beverage.

In addition to these commercial activities, Manabí province is also renowned for its indigenous arts and crafts, particularly the crafting of Montecristi hats, popularly known as Panama hats, which are renowned for their stylish designs and intricate handiwork. The province is also recognized for its furniture made from rattan.

== Cantons ==
The province is divided into 22 cantons. The following table provides a comprehensive overview of the twenty-two cantons of Manabí province, including their respective populations at the 2001 census, their areas in square kilometers (km^{2}), and the names of their respective canton seats or capitals:

Canton	Pop. (2001)	Area (km^{2})	Seat/Capital
Bolívar	35,627	537	Calceta
Chone	117,634	3,017	Chone
El Carmen	69,998	1,732	El Carmen
Flavio Alfaro	25,390	1,343	Flavio Alfaro
Jama	20,230	575	Jama
Jaramijó	11,967	97	Jaramijó
Jipijapa	65,796	1,401	Jipijapa
Junín	18,491	246	Junín
Manta	192,322	309	Manta
Montecristi	43,400	734	Montecristi
Olmedo	9,243	253	Olmedo
Paján	35,952	1,079	Paján
Pedernales	46,876	1,932	Pedernales
Pichincha	29,945	1,067	Pichincha
Portoviejo	303,682	955	Portoviejo
Puerto López	16,626	420	Puerto López
Rocafuerte	29,321	280	Rocafuerte
San Vicente	19,116	718	San Vicente
Santa Ana	45,287	1,022	Santa Ana
Sucre	52,158	764	Bahía de Caráquez
Tosagua	33,922	377	Tosagua
Veinticuatro de Mayo	28,294	524	Sucre

== Notable people ==
- Lidice Larrea (born c. 1973), politician and former representative of Manabí in the National Assembly

== See also ==
- Cantons of Ecuador
- Provinces of Ecuador
