= Provinces of Ecuador =

Ecuador's administrative division

Provinces of Ecuador Provincia del Ecuador (Spanish)
- Category: Unitary state
- Location: Ecuador
- Number: 24 Provinces
- Populations: 28,583 (Galápagos) – 4,391,923 (Guayas)
- Government: Provincial government
- Subdivisions: Canton, Parish

Ecuador is divided into 24 provinces (Spanish: provincias, singular – provincia). The provinces of Ecuador and their capitals are:

== List ==
Location	Province	Capital	Largest City	Population (2022 census)	Area (km^{2})	Established
	Azuay	Cuenca		801,609	8,189	1824
	Bolívar	Guaranda		199,078	4,148	1884
	Cañar	Azogues	La Troncal	227,578	3,669	1880
	Carchi	Tulcán		172,828	3,790	1880
	Chimborazo	Riobamba		471,933	5,999	1824
	Cotopaxi	Latacunga		470,210	6,085	1851
	El Oro	Machala		714,592	5,879	1884
	Esmeraldas	Esmeraldas		553,900	16,132	1847
	Galápagos	Puerto Baquerizo Moreno	Puerto Ayora	28,583	8,010	1973
	Guayas	Guayaquil		4,391,923	15,927	1824
	Imbabura	Ibarra		469,879	4,611	1824
	Loja	Loja		485,421	11,100	1824
	Los Ríos	Babahoyo	Quevedo	898,652	7,100	1860
	Manabí	Portoviejo	Manta	1,592,840	19,427	1824
	Morona Santiago	Macas		192,508	25,690	1954
	Napo	Tena		131,675	12,476	1959
	Orellana	Puerto Francisco de Orellana		182,166	21,691	1998
	Pastaza	Puyo		111,915	29,068	1959
	Pichincha	Quito		3,089,473	9,692	1824
	Santa Elena	Santa Elena	La Libertad	385,735	3,696	2007
	Santo Domingo de los Tsáchilas	Santo Domingo		492,969	4,180	2007
	Sucumbíos	Nueva Loja		199,014	18,612	1989
	Tungurahua	Ambato		563,532	3,222	1860
	Zamora Chinchipe	Zamora		110,973	10,556	1953
Total	–	–	–	16,938,986	283,561 square kilometres (109,484 sq mi)	

^{1} Population as per the census carried out on 2022-10-01

In addition, there were four areas that were non-delimited. These locations were:

- Las Golondrinas: In a referendum held on April 3, 2016, 56.9% of voters voted in favor of Las Golondrinas being incorporated into the Imbabura Province.
- La Manga del Cura: In a referendum held on September 27, 2015, 64.2% of the voters voted in favor of La Manga del Cura being incorporated into the Manabí Province.
- El Piedrero: incorporated into Guayas Province by the Presidential decree in 2017.
- Matilde Esther: incorporated into Guayas Province by the Presidential decree in 2017

=== Regions and planning areas ===
Regionalization, or zoning, is the union of two or more adjoining provinces in order to decentralize the administrative functions of the capital, Quito. In Ecuador, there are seven regions, or zones, each shaped by the following provinces:

- Region 1 (42,126 km^{2}, or 16,265 mi^{2}): Esmeraldas, Carchi, Imbabura, and Sucumbíos. Administrative city: Ibarra
- Region 2 (43,498 km^{2}, or 16,795 mi^{2}): Pichincha, Napo, and Orellana. Administrative city: Tena
- Region 3 (44,710 km^{2}, or 17,263 mi^{2}): Chimborazo, Tungurahua, Pastaza, and Cotopaxi. Administrative city: Riobamba
- Region 4 (22,257 km^{2}, or 8,594 mi^{2}): Manabí and Santo Domingo de los Tsachilas. Administrative city: Ciudad Alfaro
- Region 5 (38,420 km^{2}, or 14,834 mi^{2}): Santa Elena, Guayas, Los Ríos, Galápagos, and Bolívar. Administrative city: Milagro
- Region 6 (38,237 km^{2}, or 14,763 mi^{2}): Cañar, Azuay, and Morona Santiago. Administrative city: Cuenca
- Region 7 (27,571 km^{2}, or 10,645 mi^{2}): El Oro, Loja, and Zamora Chinchipe. Administrative city: Loja

Quito and Guayaquil are Metropolitan Districts. Galápagos, despite being included within Region 5, is also under a special unit.

== See also ==
- List of Ecuadorian provinces by Human Development Index
- Cantons of Ecuador
- ISO 3166-2:EC, ISO 3166-2 for codes.
- (in French) Leaders of Ecuador provinces
