= Afro-Ecuadorians =

Ecuadorian ethnic group

Afroecuatorianos (Spanish)
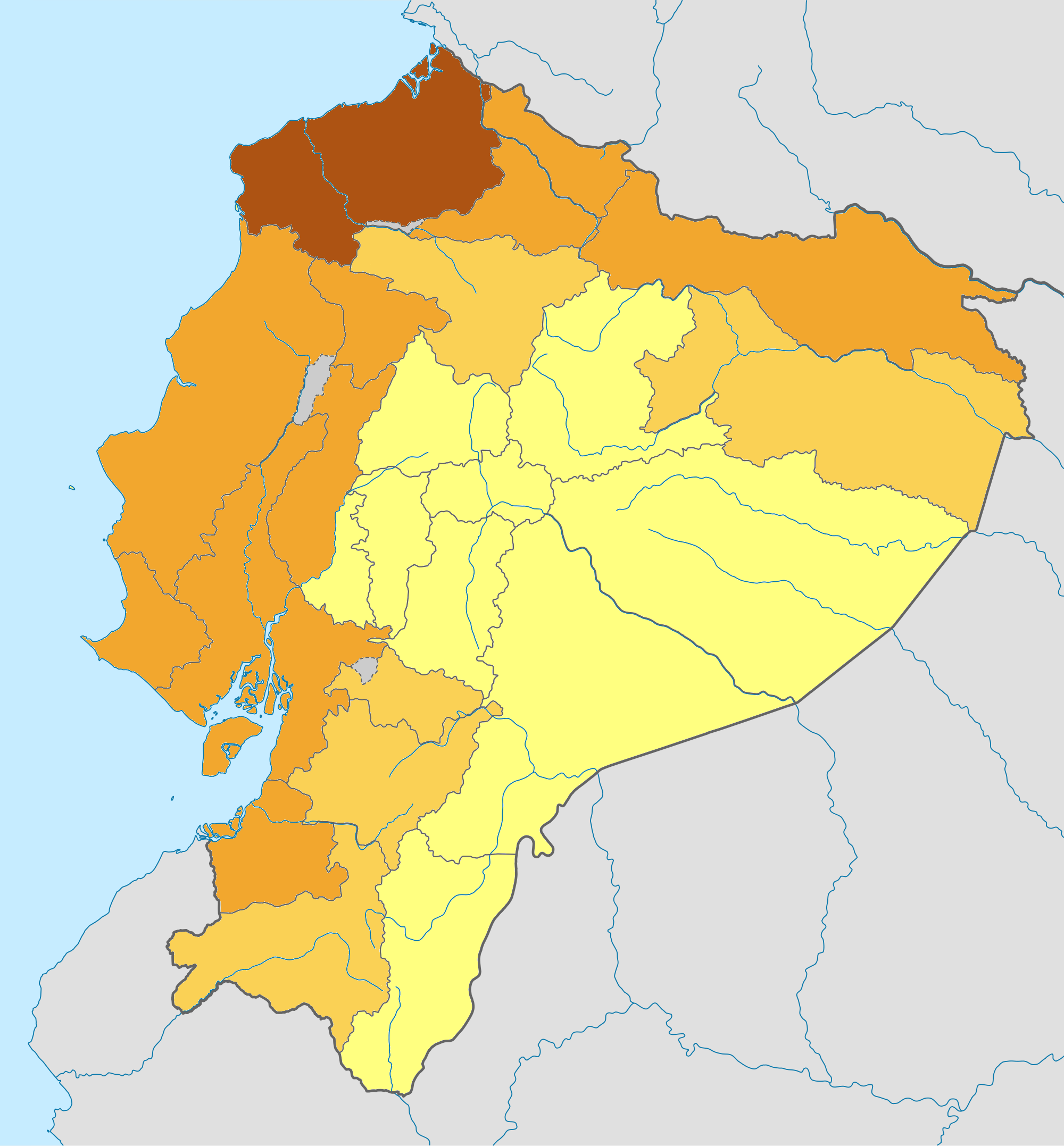
- >10%; 5% - 10%; 2% - 5%; 0% - 2%

Total population
- Sub-Saharan ancestry predominates 814,468 (2022 census); 4.81% of the Ecuadorian population

Regions with significant populations
- Esmeraldas, Guayaquil, Valle del Chota, Imbabura Province Sucumbíos Province Small minorities live in the U.S., and Spain

Languages
- Spanish, formerly Esmeraldeño

Religion
- Predominantly Catholicism

Related ethnic groups
- Other Afro-Latin Americans

Afro-Ecuadorians (Spanish: Afroecuatorianos), also known as Black Ecuadorians (Spanish: Ecuatorianos Negros), are Ecuadorians of predominantly Sub-Saharan African descent.

== History and background ==
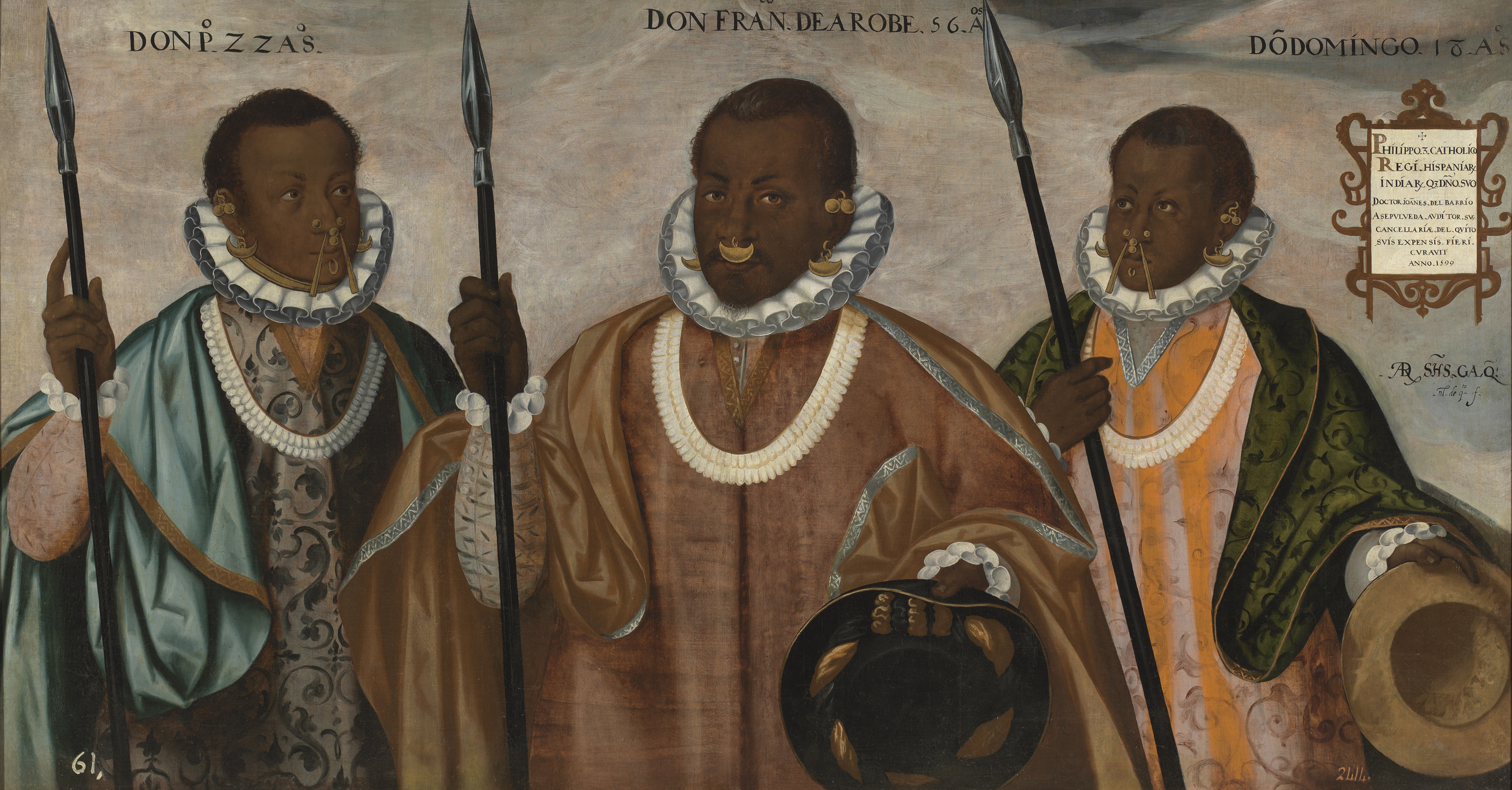
Los tres mulatos de Esmeraldas (1599) by Sánchez Galque

Most Afro-Ecuadorians are the descendants of enslaved Africans who were transported by predominantly British slavers to Ecuador from the early 16th century. In 1553, the first enslaved Africans reached Ecuador in Quito when a slave ship heading to Peru was stranded off the Ecuadorian coast. The enslaved Africans escaped and established maroon settlements in Esmeraldas, which became a safe haven as many Africans fleeing slave conditions either escaped to there or were forced to live there. Eventually, they started moving from their traditional homeland and were settling everywhere in Ecuador.

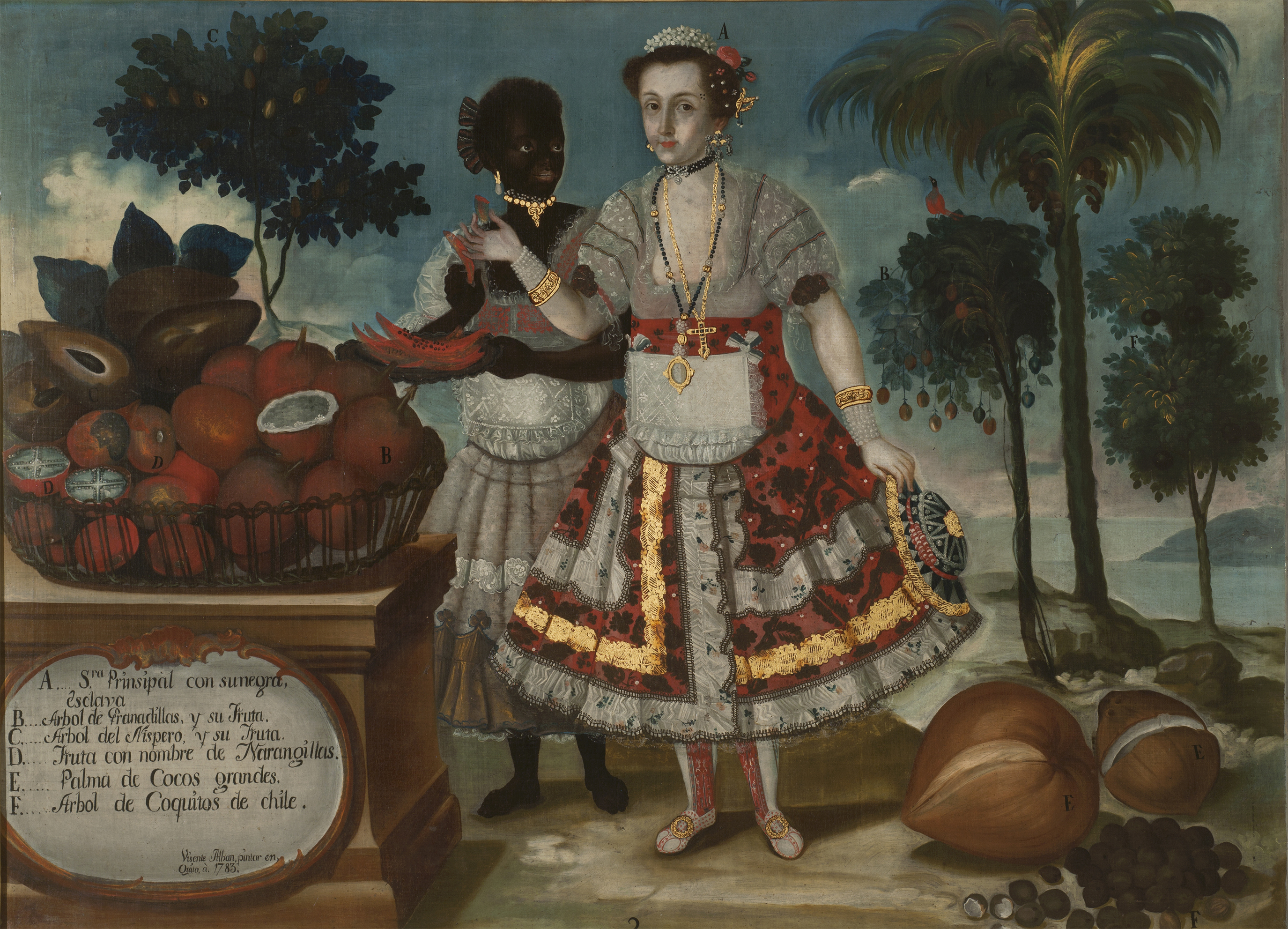
Portrait of a Quito Matron Lady with Her Black Slave by Vicente Albán (1783)

Racism is an issue on an individual basis and societally. Afro-Ecuadorians are strongly discriminated against by the mestizo and criollo populations. As a result of this racism, along with lack of government funding and low social mobility, poverty affects their community more so than the white and mestizo population of Ecuador. After slavery was abolished in 1851, Africans became marginalized in Ecuador, dominated by the plantation owners.

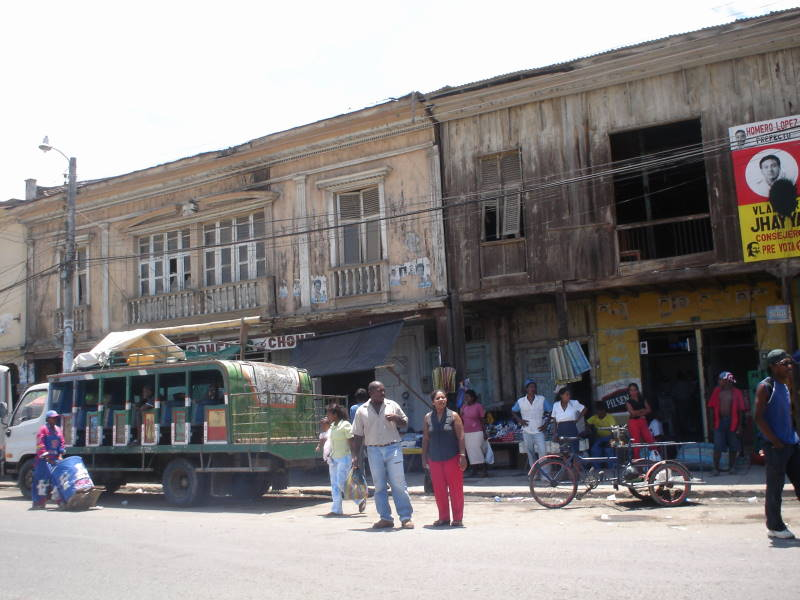
A typical street scene in Esmeraldas (2005)

Afro-Ecuadorian people and culture are found primarily in the country's northwest coastal region. The majority of the Afro-Ecuadorian population (70%) are found in the province of Esmeraldas and the Valle del Chota in the Imbabura Province, where they are the majority. They can be also found in significant numbers in Guayaquil, and in Ibarra, where in some neighborhoods, they make up a majority. Many Afro-Ecuadorians have participated in sports, for instance playing with the Ecuador national football team, many of whom hail from Valle del Chota.

== Culture ==
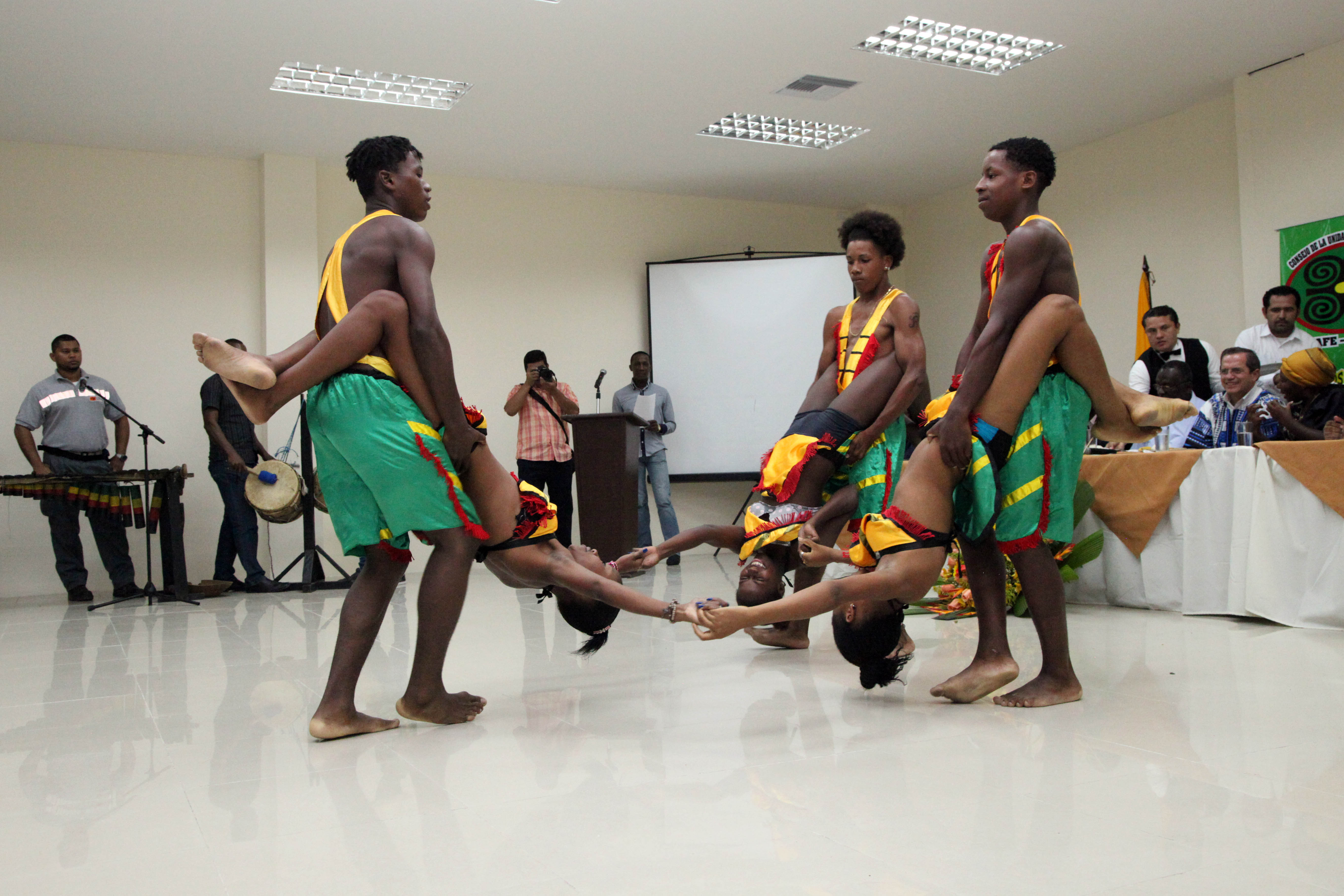
Afro-Ecuadorians at a convention to receive cultural recognition. Traditional instruments can be seen in the background.

Afro-Ecuadorian culture may be analysed by considering the two main epicenters of historical presence: the province of Esmeraldas, and the Chota Valley. In Ecuador it is often said that Afro Ecuadorians live predominantly in warm places like Esmeraldas. Afro-Ecuadorian culture is a result of the trans-Atlantic slave trade. Their culture and its impact on Ecuador has led to many aspects from West and Central Africa cultures being preserved via ordinary acts of resistance and commerce. Examples of these include the use of polyrhythmic techniques, traditional instruments and dances; along with food ways such as the use of crops brought from Africa, like the Plantain and Pigeon pea, and oral traditions and mythology like La Tunda. When women wear their hair as it grows naturally, it is often associated with poverty, which is why successful or upwardly mobile women tended to straighten their hair.

=== Music ===
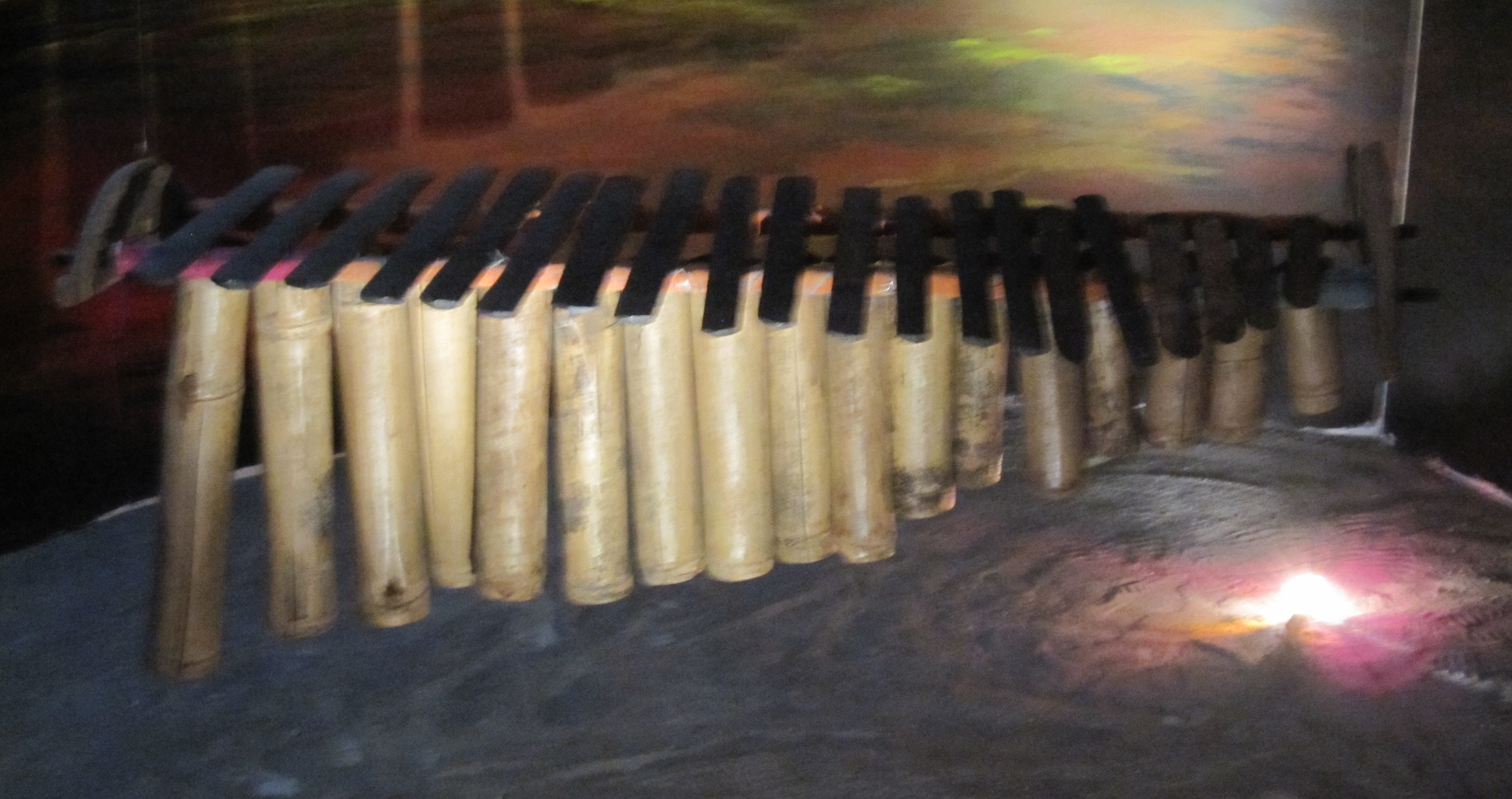
A typical marimba from Esmeraldas

Marimba music is popular from Esmeraldas to the Pacific Region of Colombia. It was considered an Intangible cultural heritage by UNESCO in 2010. It gets its name from the prominent use of marimbas, but is accompanied along with dances, chants, drums and other instruments specific to this region such as the bombo, the cununo and the guasá.

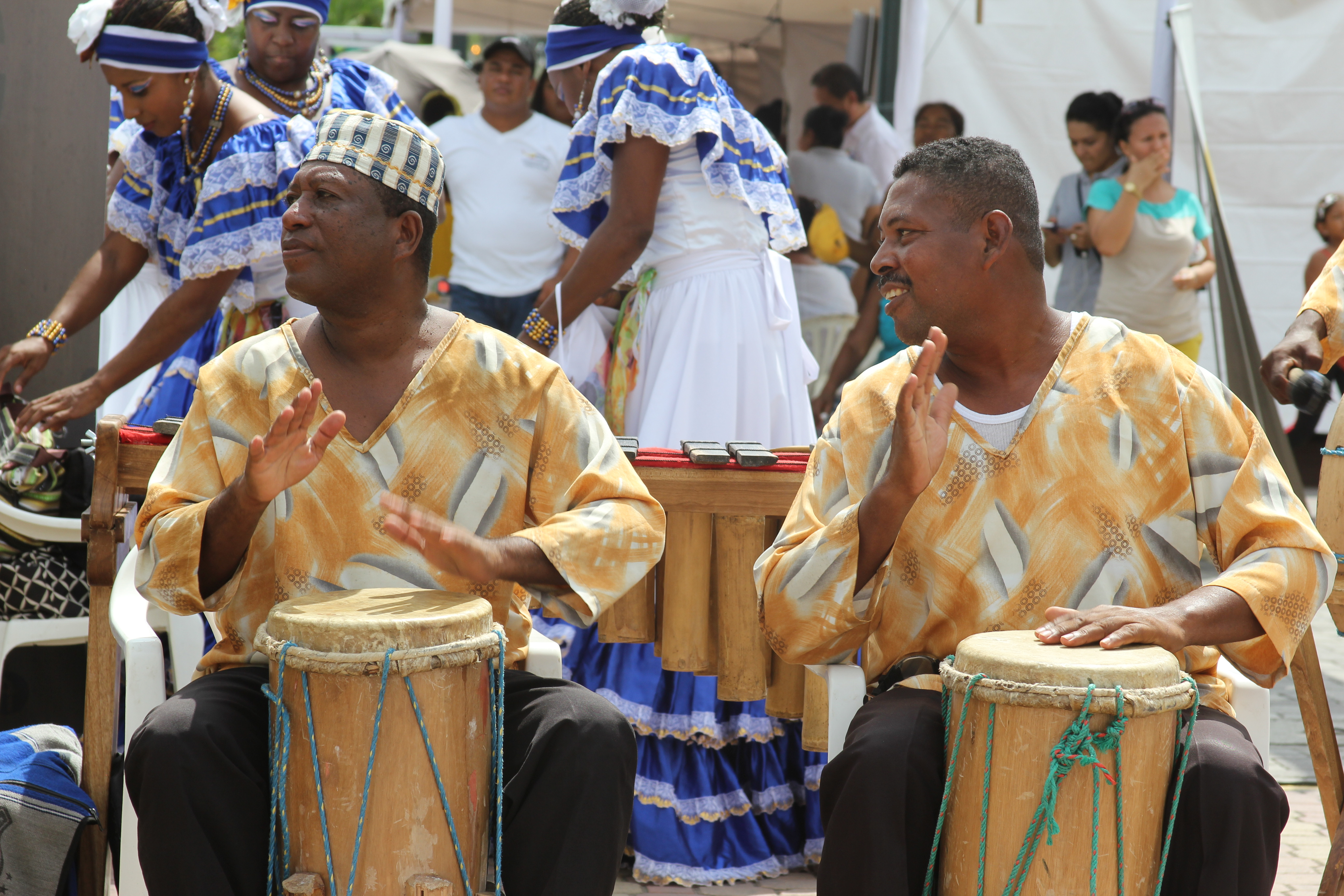
An example of the cununo in the semi-final round of a championship in Esmeraldas

Sometimes this music is played in religious ceremonies, as well as in celebrations and parties. It features call-and-response chanting along with the music. Some of the rhythms associated with it are currulao, bambuco and andarele.

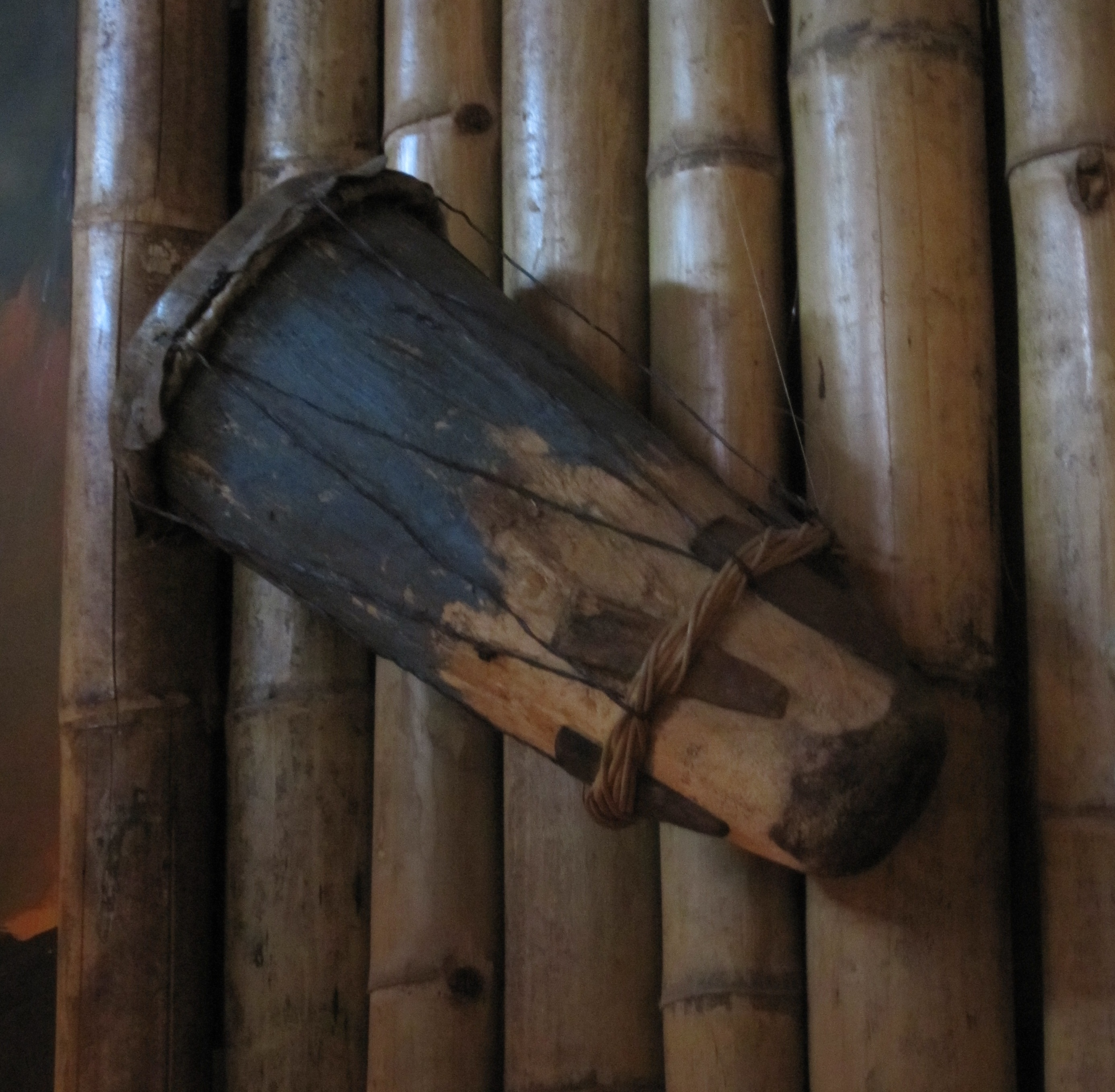
Afro-Ecuadorian style drum from Esmeralda

On the other hand, in the Chota Valley there is bomba music. It can vary from mid-tempo to a very fast rhythm. It is usually played with guitars, as well as the main local instrument called bomba, which is a drum, along with a guiro, and sometimes bombos and bongos. A variation of it played by la banda mocha, groups who play bomba with a bombo, guiro and plant leaves to give melody.

=== Religion ===
The religious practice among Afro-Ecuadorians is usually Catholic. Catholic worship is distinctive in Esmeraldas, and sometimes is done with marimba.

== Political framework ==
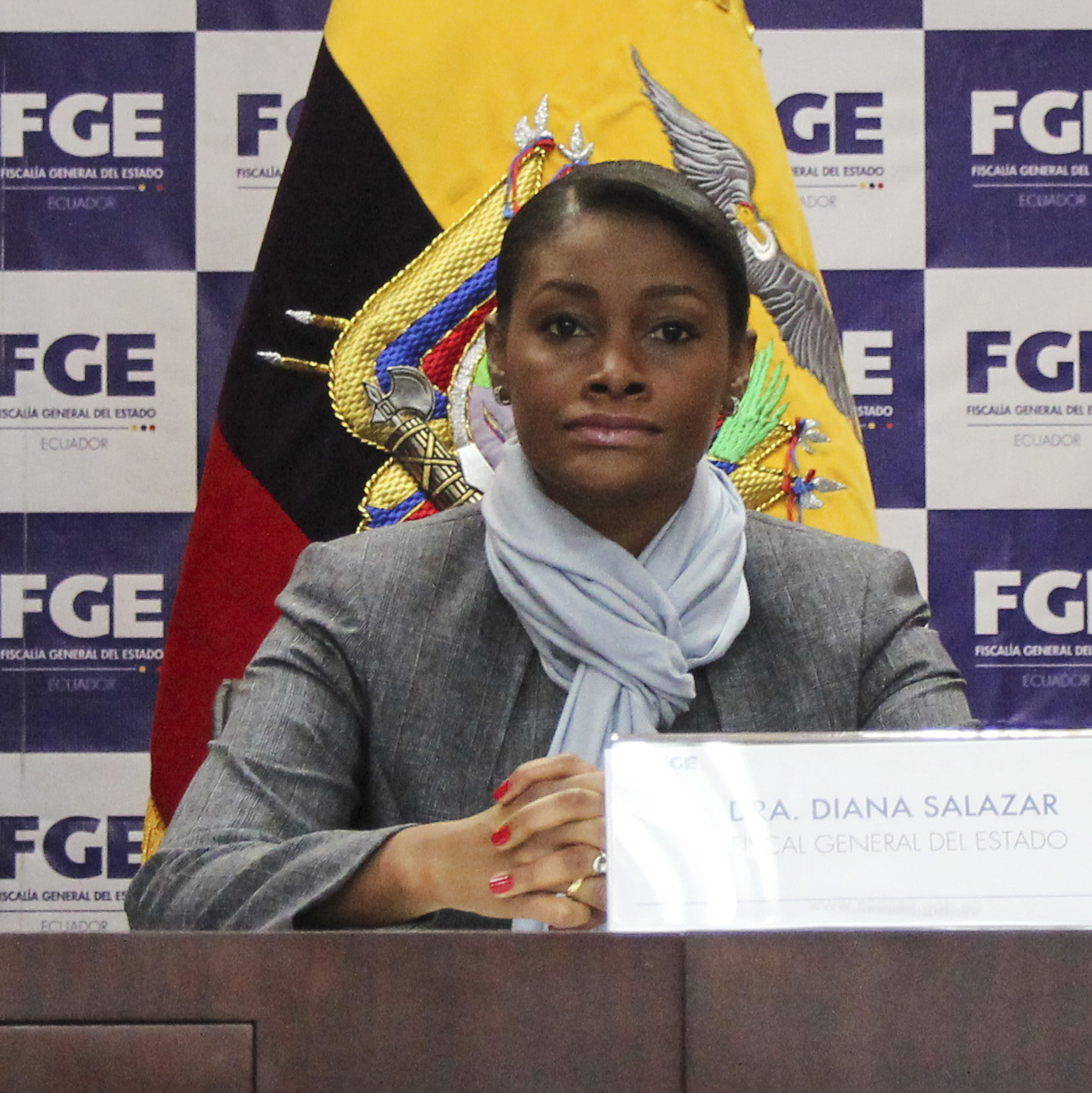
Dr. Diana Salazar Méndez, attorney general, Quito (2019)

Numerous organizations have been established in Ecuador to for Afro-Ecuadorian issues. The Afro-Ecuadorian Development Council (CONDAE). Afro-Ecuadorian Development Corporation (Corporación de Desarrollo Afroecuatoriano, CODAE), institutionalized in 2002, Asociación de Negros Ecuatorianos (ASONE), founded in 1988, Afro-Ecuadorian Institute, founded in 1989, the Agustín Delgado Foundation, the Black Community Movement (El Proceso de Comunidades Negras) and the National Confederation of Afro-Ecuadorians (Confederación Nacional Afroecuatoriana, CNA) are some of the institutional frameworks in place in Ecuador. The World Bank has given loans for Afro-Ecuadorian development proposals in Ecuador since 1998, loaning $34 million for related projects between 2003 and 2007, and USAID also monitored the 2006 elections in Ecuador to ensure that Afro-Ecuadorians were not being unfairly underrepresented.

== Notable Afro-Ecuadorians ==
=== Historical ===
- Francisco de Arobe (1543 – after 1606), leader of Afro-Indigenous maroon communities
- Martina Carrillo (1750–1778), Ecuadorian activist, born enslaved, who fought for the rights of Afro-Ecuadorians
- Alonso de Illescas (1528–1600s), African Maroon leader in Esmeraldas in colonial Ecuador
- María del Tránsito Sorroza, midwife and formerly enslaved woman

=== Politics ===
==== Government ====
- Paola Cabezas, first Afro-Ecuadorian presenter of Ecuador TV and politician
- Diana Salazar Méndez, attorney general of Ecuador
- Lucía Sosa, mayor of Esmeraldas 2005–2013 and 2014–2018

==== Activism ====
- Jaime Hurtado, from Guayaquil; known for fighting for the rights of the working people of Ecuador; founder and leader of the Democratic People's Movement (MPD); assassinated in 1999

=== Music ===
- Guillermo Ayoví Erazo, Ecuadorian marimba player and singer

=== Literature ===
- Nelson Estupiñán Bass (1912–2012), poet and author
- Adalberto Ortiz (1914–2003), poet, diplomat and author

=== Sports ===
==== Boxing ====
- Carlos Andrés Mina, Ecuadorian Light heavyweight boxer
- Érika Pachito, Ecuadorian women's Olympic middleweight boxer
- María José Palacios, Ecuadorian women's Olympic lightweight boxer

==== Judo ====
- Carmen Chalá, Ecuadorian Olympic judoka
- Diana Chalá, Ecuadorian Olympic judoka
- Vanessa Chalá, Ecuadorian Olympic judoka

==== Mixed martial arts ====
- Michael Morales

==== Discus ====
- Juan José Caicedo, Ecuadorian discus thrower that competed in the 2020 Summer Olympics

==== Weightlifting ====
- Neisi Dájomes, gold medalist for women's weightlifting at the 2020 Tokyo Olympics
- Alexandra Escobar, Ecuadorian Olympic weightlifter
- Dixon Arroyo, weightlifter and bronze medalist at the 2023 Pan American Games
- Oliba Nieve, gold medalist for women's weightlifting at the 2007 Pan American Games
- Angie Palacios, Ecuadorian Olympic weightlifter and sister of Neisi Dájomes
- Tamara Salazar, silver medalist for women's weightlifting at the 2020 Tokyo Olympics

==== Sprinting ====
- Yuliana Angulo, Ecuadorian Olympic sprinter
- Álex Quiñónez, Ecuadorian Olympic sprinter; finalist in 200-meter dash at the 2012 Summer Olympics
- Ángela Tenorio, Ecuador Olympic sprinter

==== Football ====
- Gabriel Achilier, player
- Darío Aimar, player
- Franklin Anangonó, player and manager
- Brayan Angulo, player
- Nilson Angulo, player
- Tamara Angulo, player
- Rorys Aragón, player
- Robert Arboleda, player
- Dixon Arroyo, player
- Michael Arroyo, player
- Jaime Ayoví, player
- Walter Ayoví, player
- Óscar Bagüí, player
- Maximo Banguera, player
- Christian Benítez, player
- Álex Bolaños, player
- Alexander Bolaños, player
- Miller Bolaños, player
- Nayely Bolaños, player
- Adrián Bone, player
- Carina Caicedo, player
- Felipe Caicedo, player
- Fricio Caicedo, player
- Jessy Caicedo, player
- Moisés Caicedo, player
- Omar Carabalí, player
- Wilson Carabalí, player and manager
- Byron Castillo, player
- Denil Castillo, player
- Segundo Castillo, player and manager
- Juan Cazares, player
- Walter Chalá, player
- Nicole Charcopa, player
- José Cifuentes, player
- Janner Corozo, player
- Ulises de la Cruz, player
- Agustin Delgado, player hailing from Juncal village; signed a $3.5 million deal with the team from Southampton, England in 2001
- Alexander Domínguez, player
- Frickson Erazo, player
- Giovanny Espinoza, player
- Pervis Estupiñán, player
- Christian García, player
- Carlos Gruezo, player
- Jorge Guagua, player
- Joffre Guerrón, player
- Ivan Hurtado, player
- Renato Ibarra, player
- Romario Ibarra, player
- Anderson Julio, player
- Jhojan Julio, player
- Jefferson Lara, player
- Juan Carlos León, player and manager
- Fidel Martínez, player
- Édison Méndez, player and manager
- Sebas Méndez, player for the Orlando City SC
- Arturo Mina, player
- Allen Obando, player
- Katherine Ortiz, player
- Willian Pacho, player
- Jairo Padilla, player
- Diego Palacios, player
- Juan Carlos Paredes, player
- Gonzalo Plata, player
- Joao Plata, player
- Ángelo Preciado, player
- Ayrton Preciado, player
- Hólger Quiñónez, player and manager
- Mónica Quinteros, player
- Moisés Ramírez, player
- Kerlly Real, player
- Djorkaeff Reasco, player
- Néicer Reasco, player
- Jhafets Reyes, player
- Kevin Rodríguez, player
- Alberto Spencer (1937–2006), player and all-time top scorer of the Copa Libertadores
- Antonio Valencia, player for Manchester United and Ecuador national team
- Enner Valencia, player for Internacional and Ecuador national team
- José Valencia, player
- Gustavo Vallecilla, player
- Erika Vásquez, player
- Pedro Velasco, player
- Wendy Villón, player and manager
- John Yeboah, player

== Gallery ==
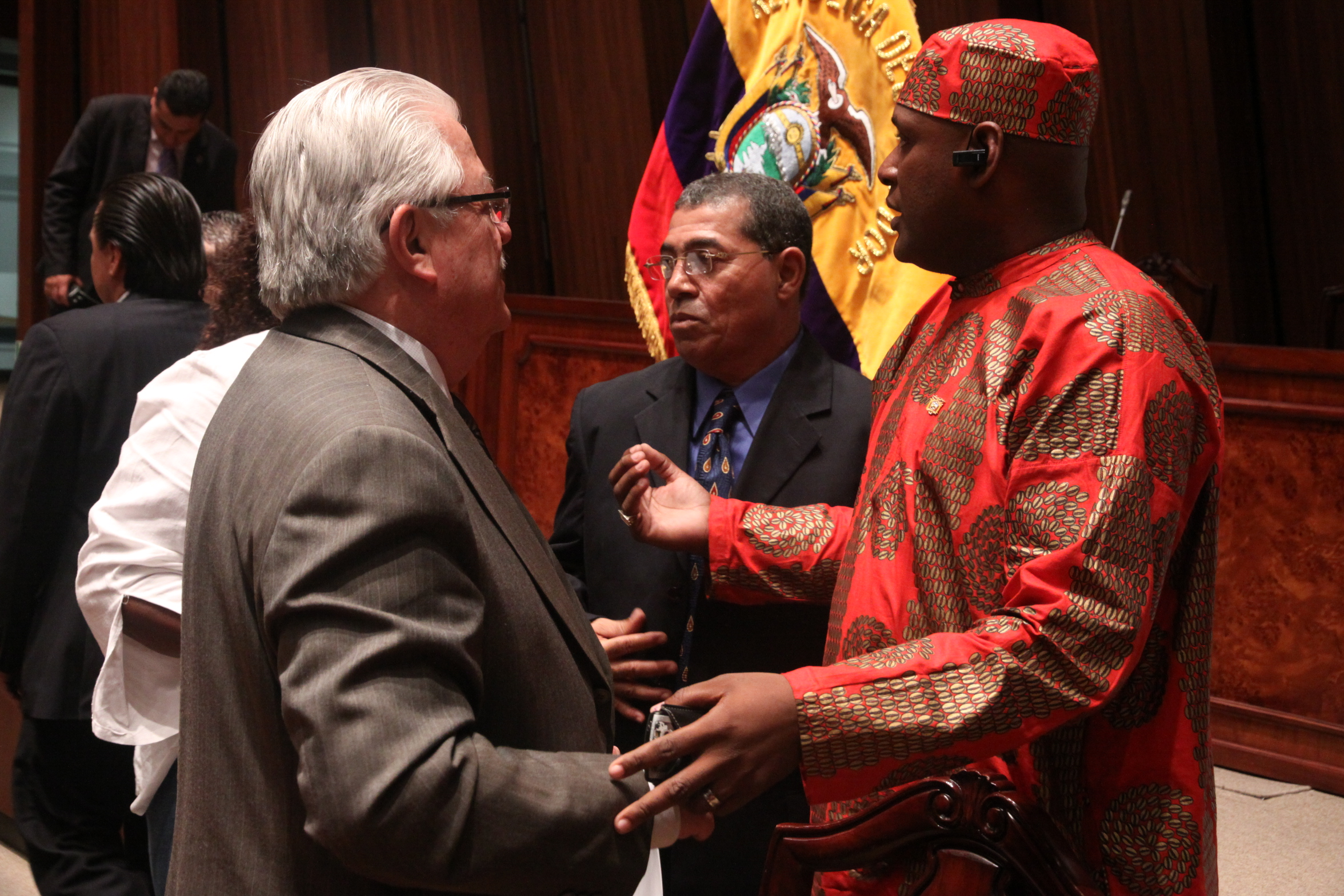
An Afro-Ecuadorian in the national assembly

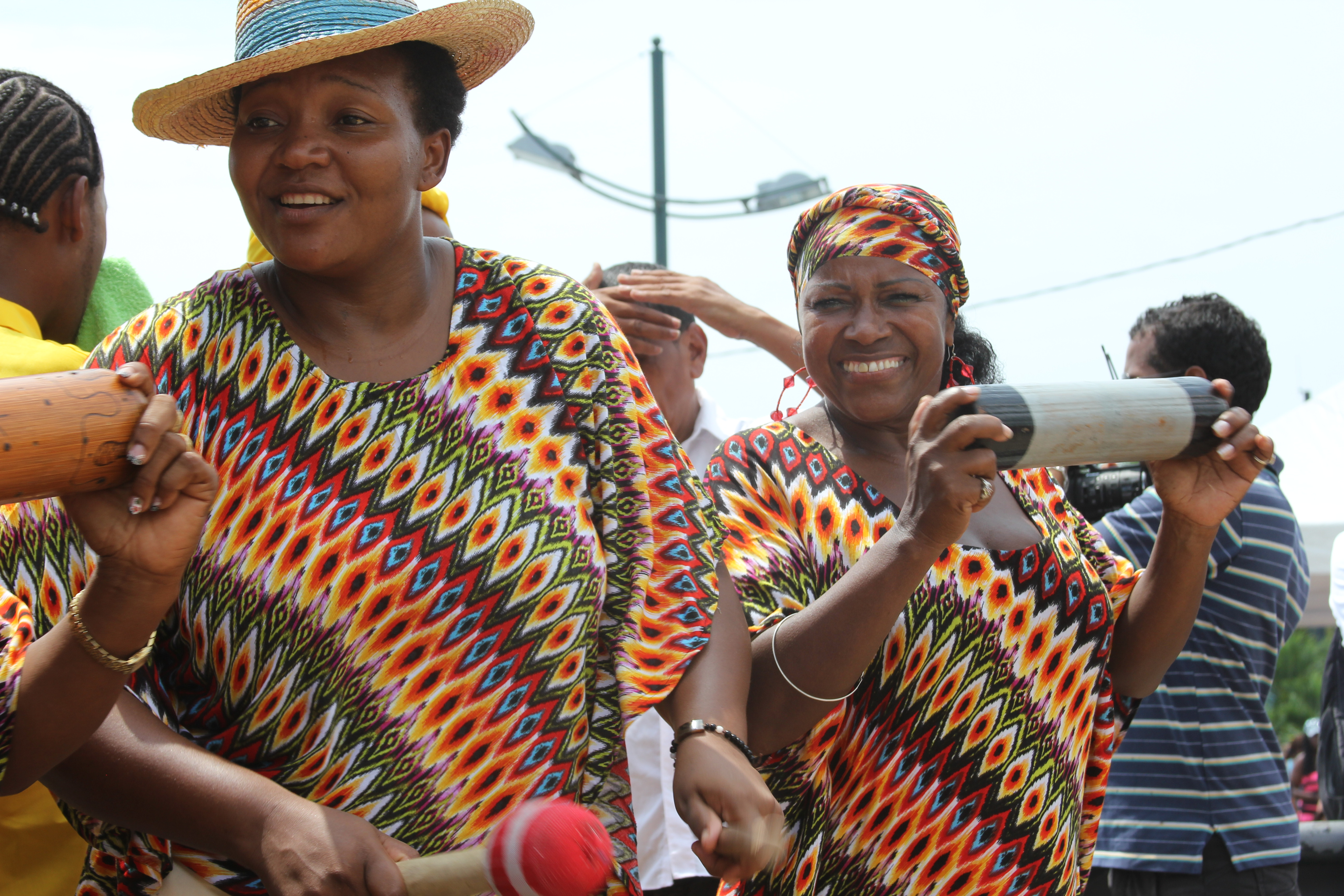
Semifinal of the Encebollado Championship in Esmeraldas, 2015

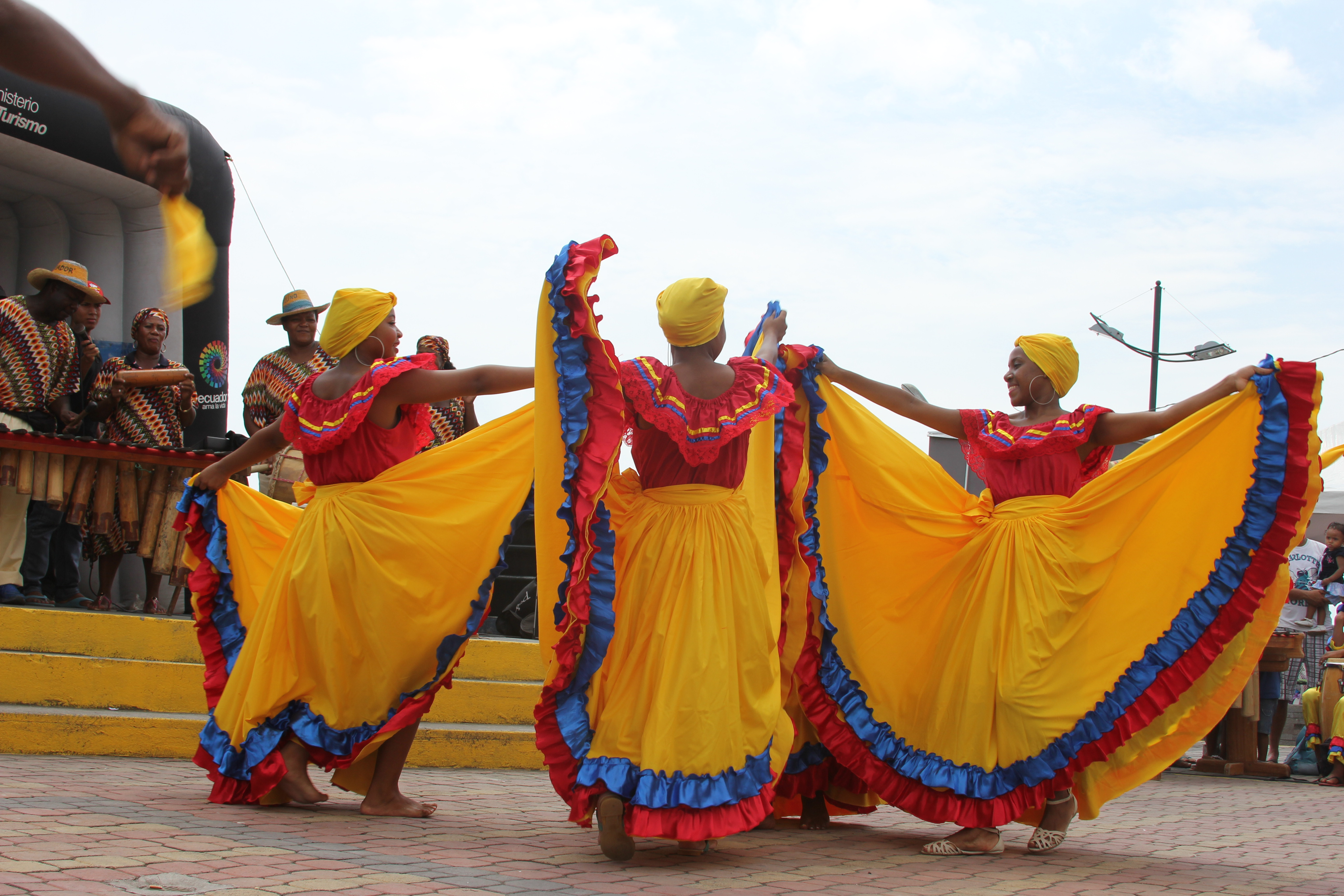
Semifinal of the Encebollado Championship in Esmeraldas, 2015

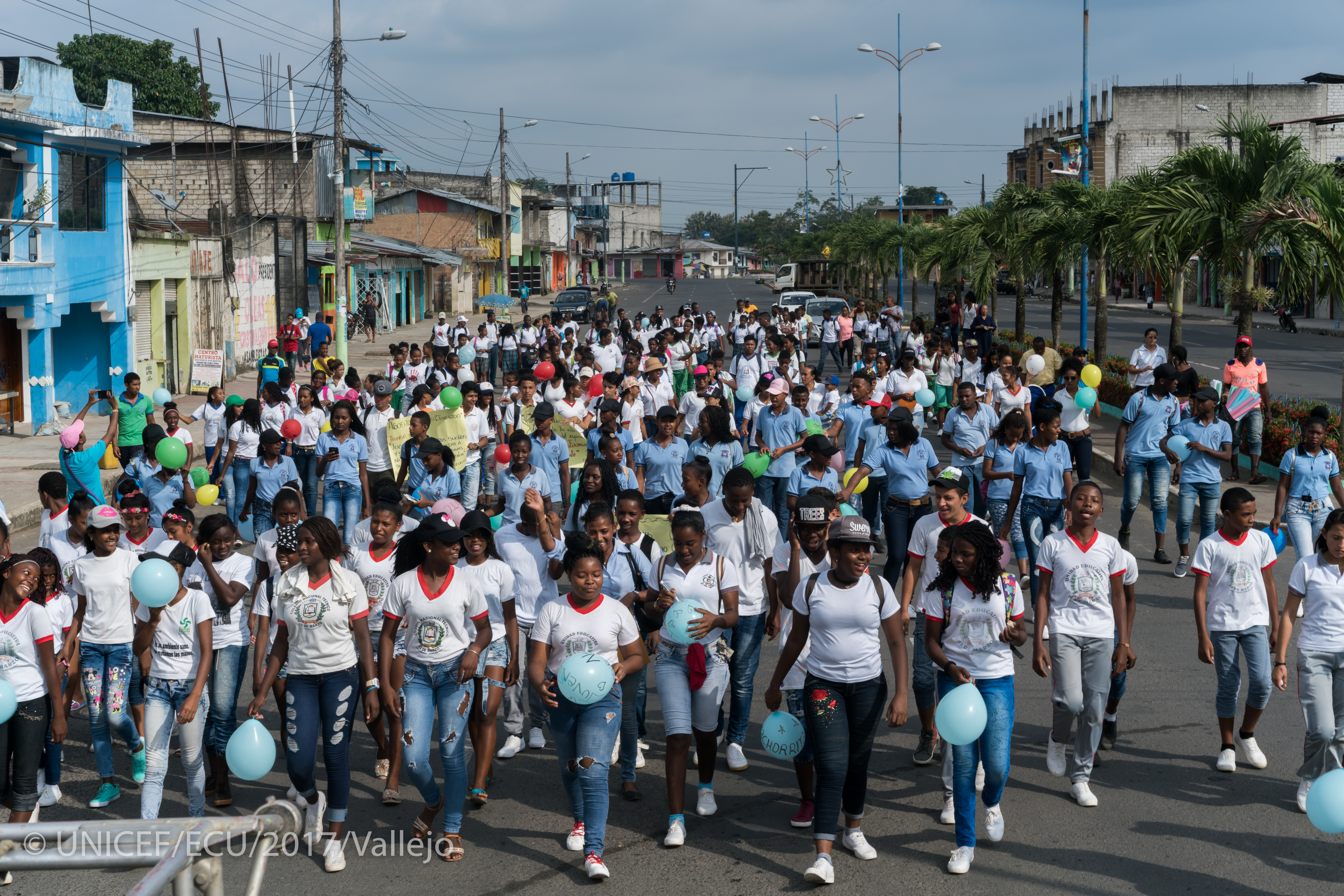
"Together for our rights" march through the streets of San Lorenzo, Esmeraldas

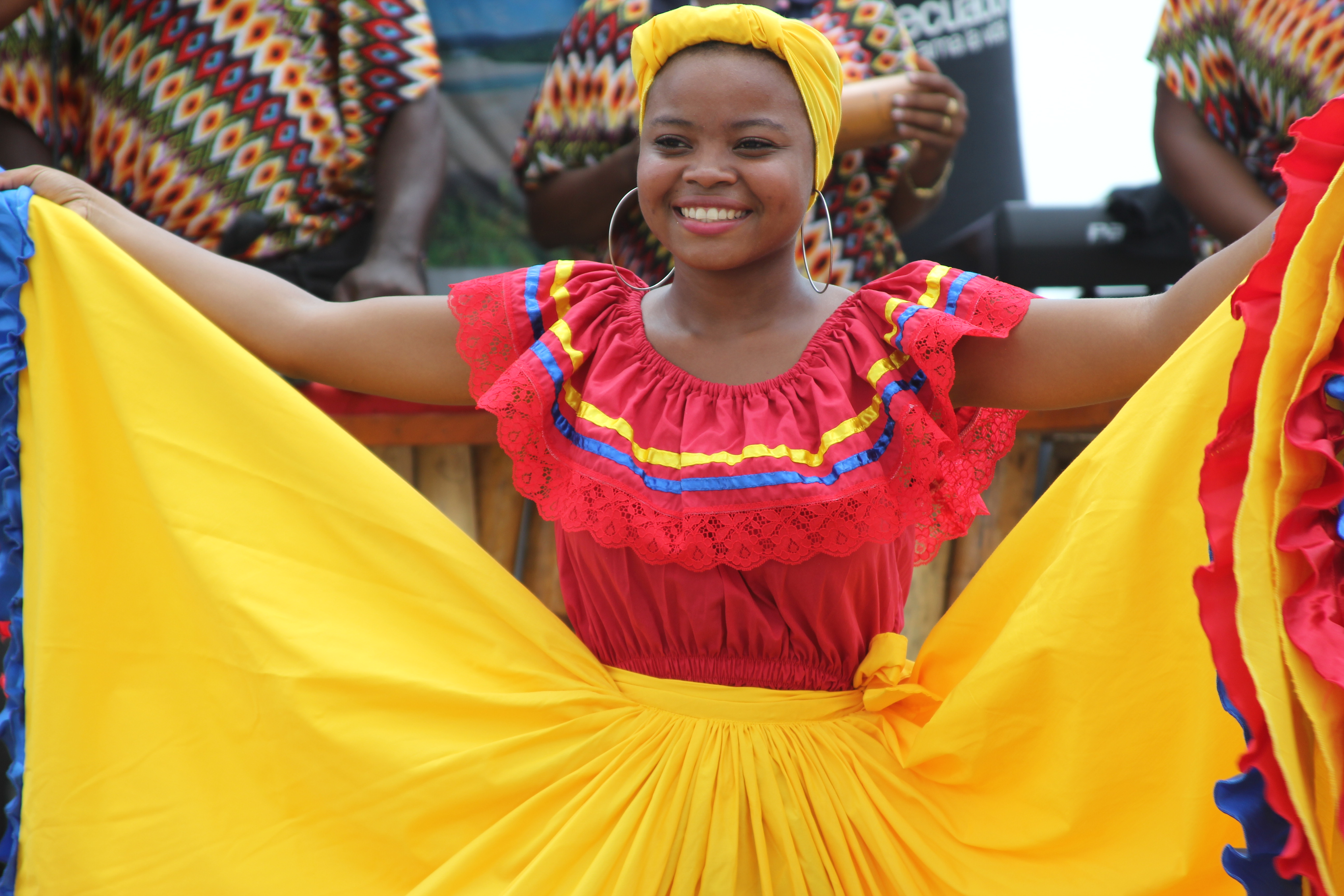
Semifinal of the Encebollado Championship in Esmeraldas, 2015]

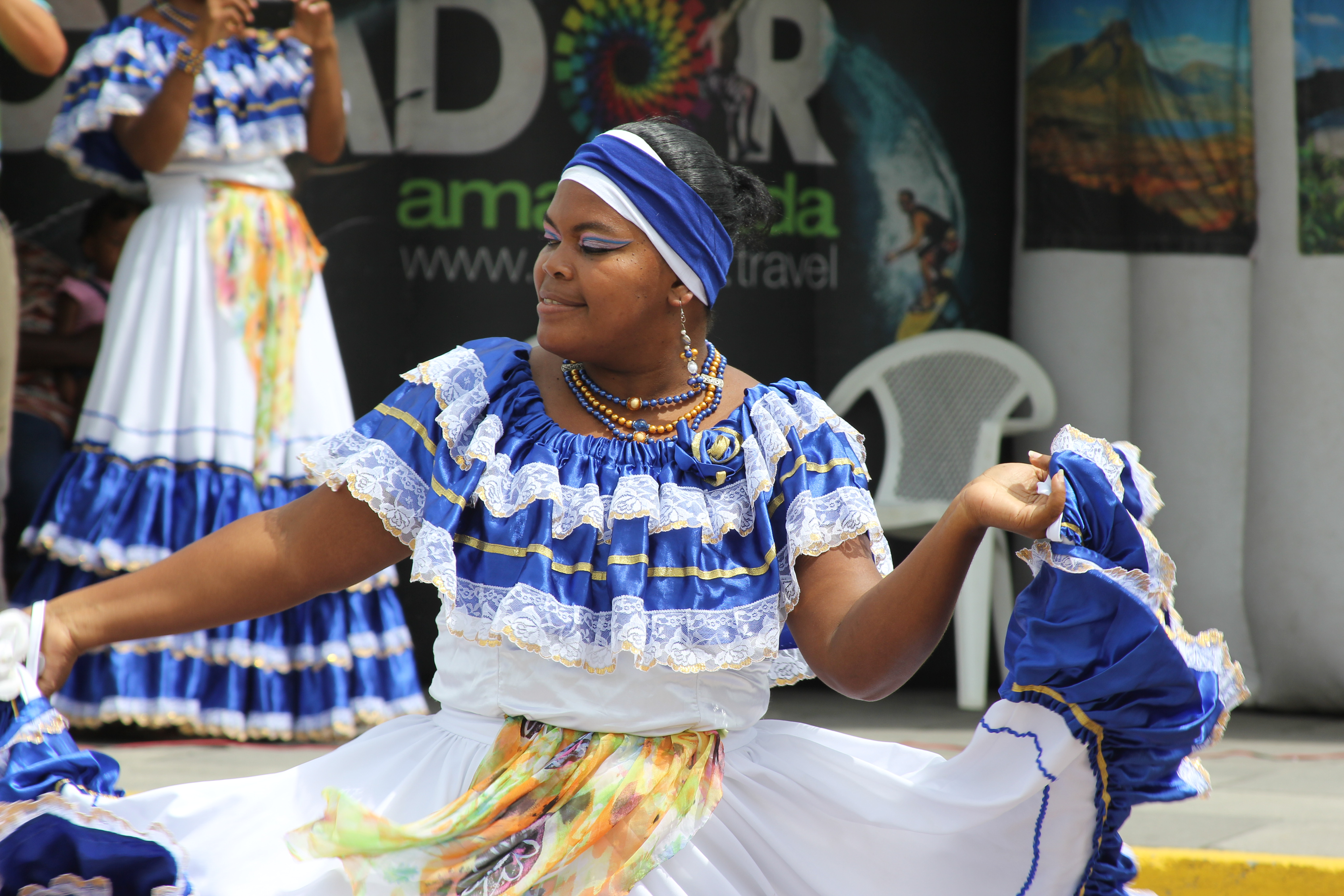
Semifinal of the Encebollado Championship in Esmeraldas, 2015

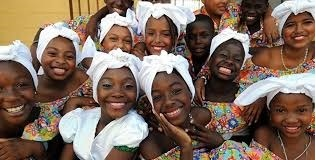
Afro-Ecuadorian girls in traditional clothing

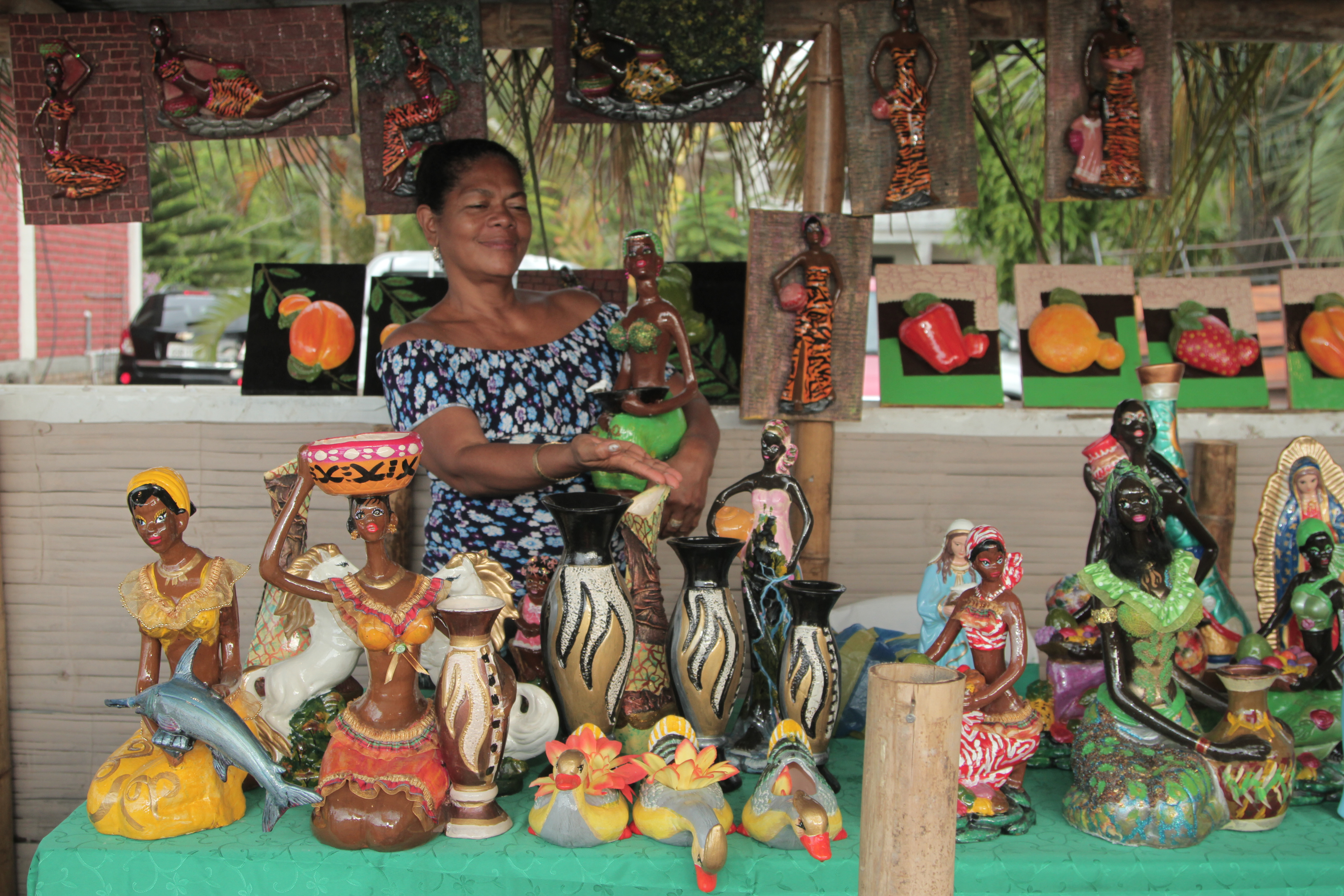
An Afro-Ecuadorian artesian vendor

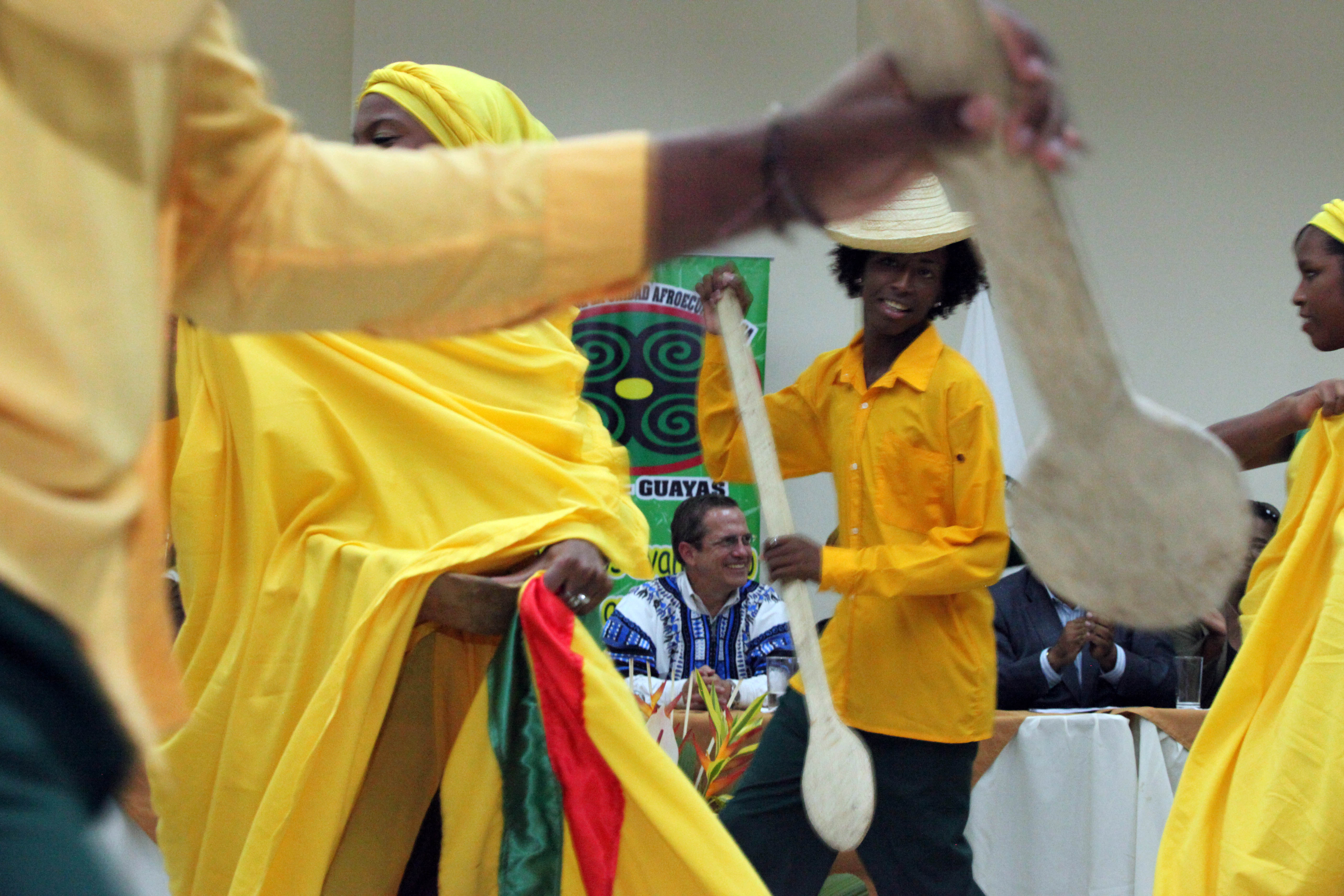
Afro-Ecuadorians offer recognition to foreign minister.

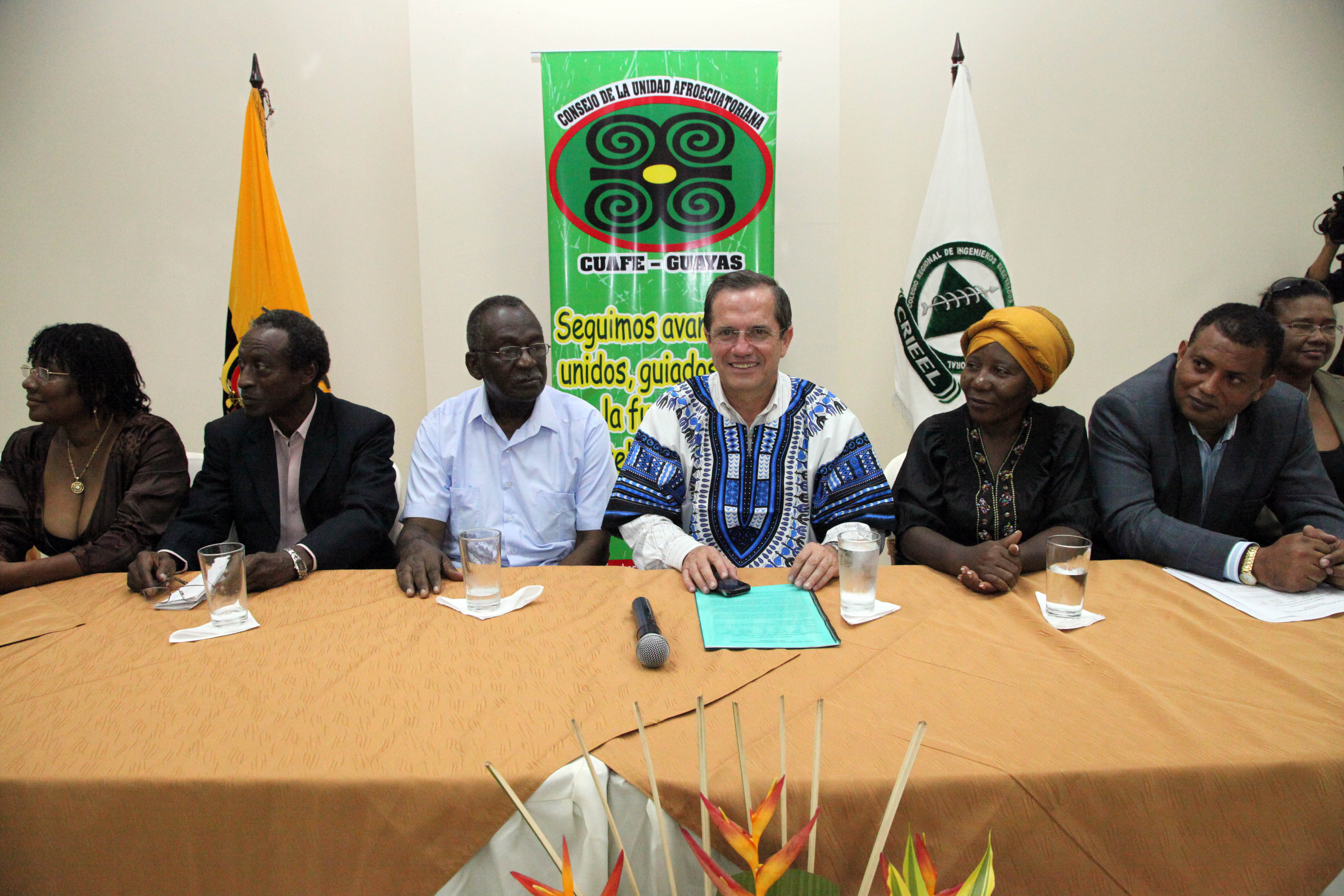
Afro-Ecuadorians offer recognition to foreign minister.

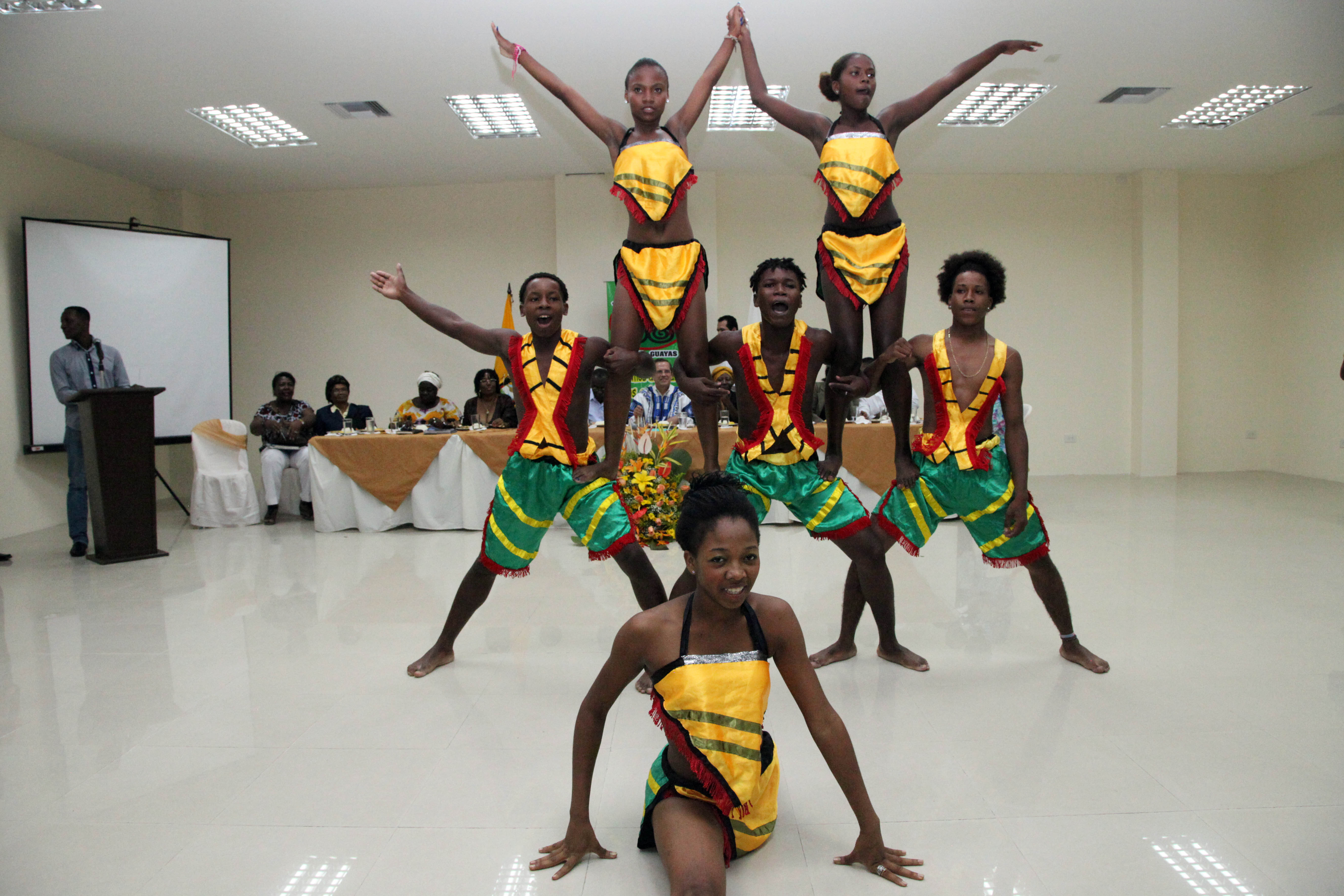
Afro-Ecuadorians offer recognition to foreign minister.

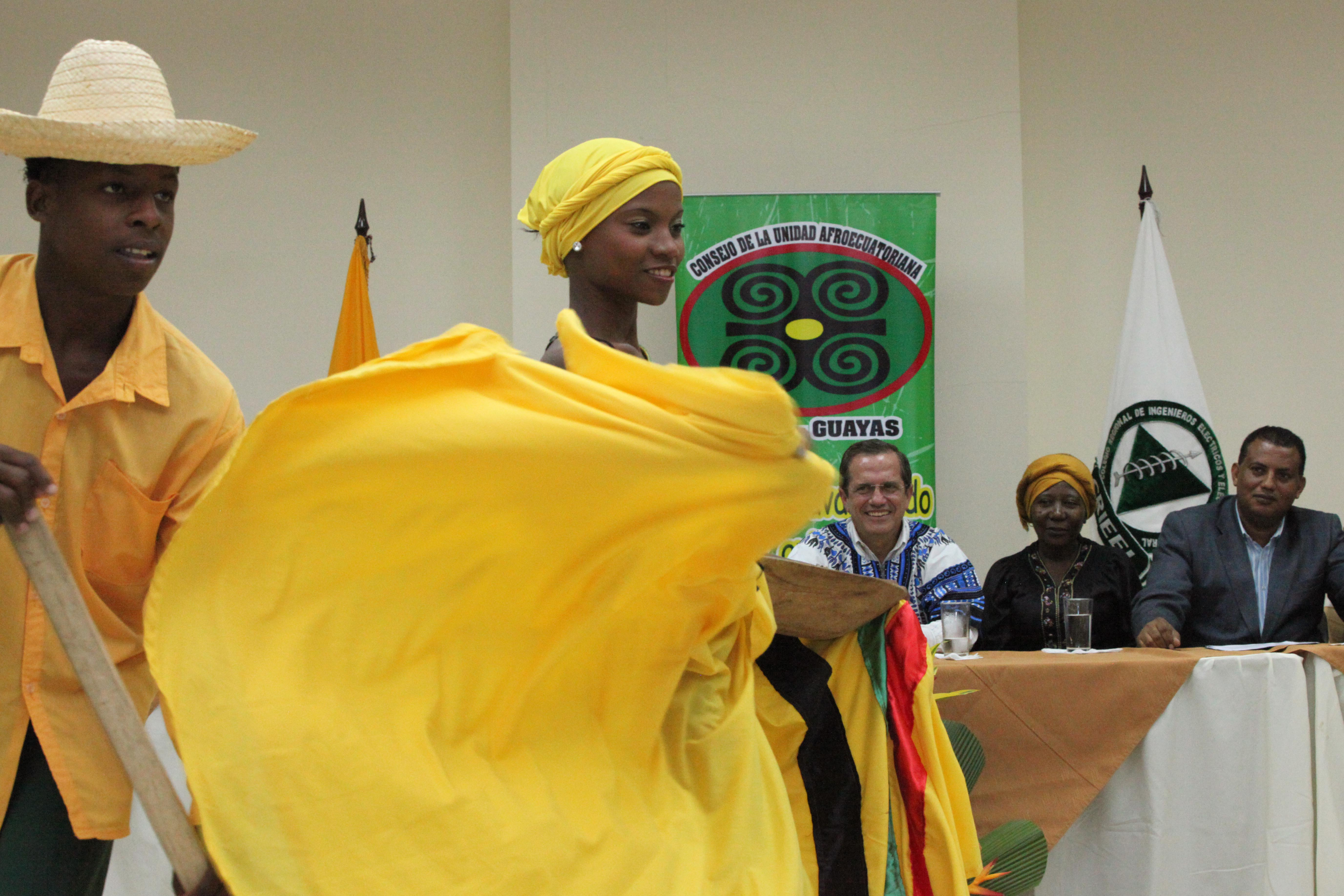
Afro-Ecuadorians offer recognition to foreign minister.

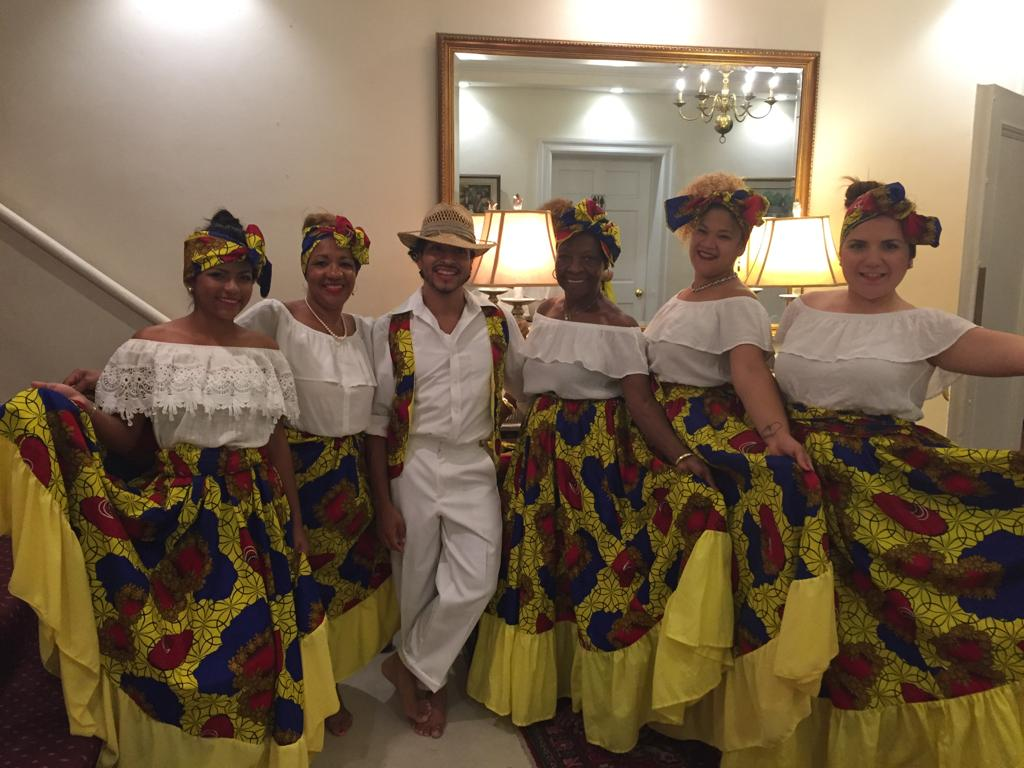
An Afro-Ecuadorian marimba group from Esmeraldas

== See also ==
- Afro-Latin Americans
- List of Afro-Latinos
