= Echeandía Canton =

- Canton
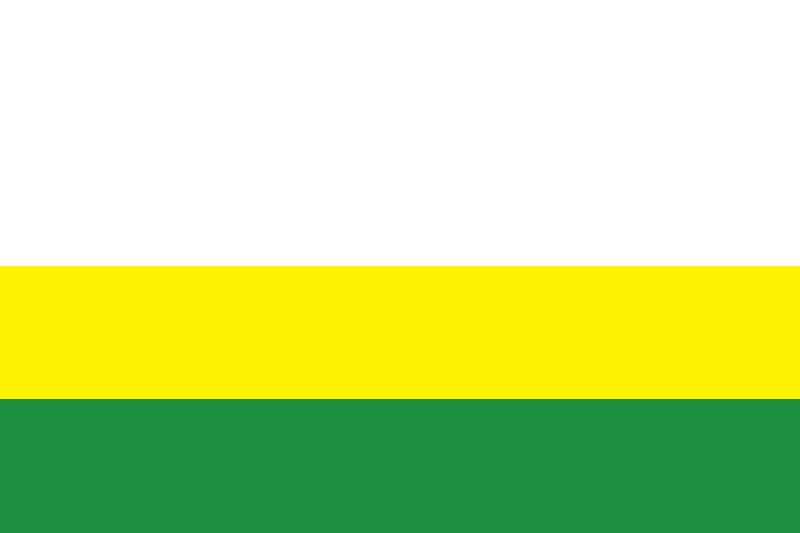
- Flag

- Location of Bolívar Province in Ecuador.

- Echeandía Canton in Bolívar Province
- Coordinates: 01°26′0″S 79°16′0″W
- Country: Ecuador
- Province: Bolívar Province
- Capital: Echeandía

Area
  - Total: 244.9 km^{2} (94.6 sq mi)

Population (2022 census)
  - Total: 14,654
  - Density: 59.84/km^{2} (155.0/sq mi)
- Time zone: UTC-5 (ECT)

Echeandía Canton is a canton of Ecuador, located in the Bolívar Province. Its capital is the town of Echeandía. Its population at the 2001 census was 10,951.

== Demographics ==
Ethnic groups as of the Ecuadorian census of 2010:

- Mestizo 85.5%
- White 4.7%
- Indigenous 4.4%
- Montubio 3.5%
- Afro-Ecuadorian 1.8%
- Other 0.2%
