= Esmeraldas Canton =

- Canton
- Flag

- Coordinates: 1°3′N 79°12′W
- Country: Ecuador
- Province: Esmeraldas Province

Area
  - Total: 1,346 km^{2} (520 sq mi)

Population (2022 census)
  - Total: 211,848
  - Density: 157.4/km^{2} (407.6/sq mi)
- Time zone: UTC-5 (ECT)

Esmeraldas Canton is a canton of Ecuador, located in the Esmeraldas Province. Its capital is the town of Esmeraldas. Its population at the 2001 census was 157,792.

== Demographics ==
Ethnic groups as of the Ecuadorian census of 2010:

- Afro-Ecuadorian 55.5%
- Mestizo 37.4%
- White 4.9%
- Montubio 1.1%
- Indigenous 0.7%
- Other 0.3%
