= Christian García (Ecuadorian footballer) =

Ecuadorean footballer (born 2004)

Personal information
- Full name: Christian García Cajas
- Date of birth: 6 July 2004 (age 22)
- Place of birth: Madrid, Spain
- Height: 1.83 m (6 ft 0 in)
- Position: Defender

Team information
- Current team: Independiente del Valle
- Number: 58

Youth career
- 2010–2020: Siete Picos Colemar
- 2020–2021: Alcobendas
- 2021–2022: Real Madrid
- 2022–2023: Leganés

Senior career*
Years	Team	Apps	(Gls)
2023-	Independiente del Valle	0	(0)

International career^{‡}
2023–	Ecuador U-20	8	(0)
- * Club domestic league appearances and goals as of 00:15, 29 May 2024 (UTC) ‡ National team caps and goals as of 29 May 2024

Christian García Cajas (born 6 July 2004) is a footballer who plays for Independiente del Valle. Born and raised in Spain to a Spanish father and an Afro-Ecuadorian mother, he is an Ecuador youth international.

== Club career ==
Born in Madrid to an Afro-Ecuadorian mother and a Spanish father, Garcia played football from a young age. In July 2021 he joined the academy at Real Madrid after a season with Alcobendas CF. Prior to that, he had spent ten years with Siete Picos Colmenar in Madrid, where he had captained his side. In 2022, Garcia signed with CD Leganés. He joined Independiente del Valle in July 2023.

== International career ==
Garcia was called up to the Ecuador U-20 for the 2023 FIFA U-20 World Cup held in Argentina in May 2023.
