= María del Tránsito Sorroza =

Afro-Ecuadorian midwife and formerly enslaved woman

Maria del Tránsito Sorroza (fl. 1646) was an Afro-Ecuadorian woman who obtained her emancipation from slavery due to her skill as a midwife. She became known by the nickname "Hands of Silk".

== Biography ==
Tránsito Sorroza was a woman of African descent, who lived in Guayaquil during the seventeenth century. She dedicated herself to the role of midwife and such was her ability that was given the nickname "Hands of Silk". In recognition of her contribution to the society of the time, she was granted emancipation in 1646. She also brought up several young black women who were born illegitimate.

== Legacy ==
The doctor and philanthropist Ignacio Hurtado de López used his own money to build the Nuestra Señora Tránsito Hospital in Guayaquil in honour of María del Tránsito Sorroza. In 2017 her life featured in the exhibition Mujeres de Guayaquil, siglo XVI al XX.
