= Esmeraldas, Ecuador =

Esmeraldas
- City
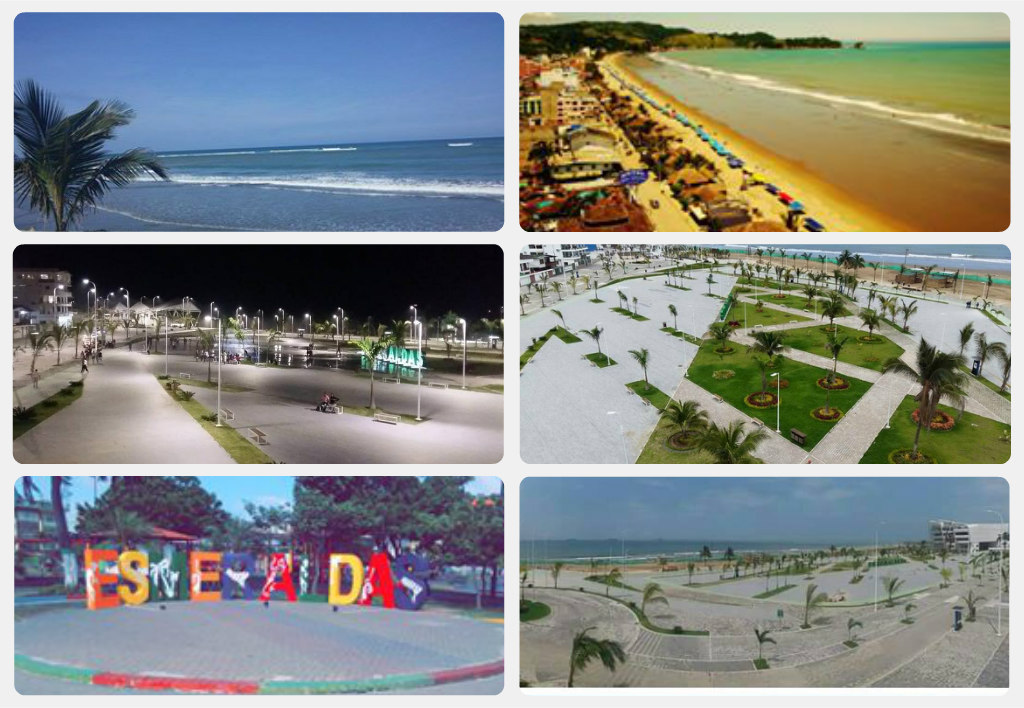
- Photos taken in the city

- Flag

- Location within Ecuador
- Coordinates: 0°58′00″N 79°39′10″W
- Country: Ecuador
- Province: Esmeraldas
- Canton: Esmeraldas
- Founded: September 21, 1526

Government
  - Mayor: Vicko Villacís

Area
  - City: 28.03 km^{2} (10.82 sq mi)
- Elevation: 15 m (49 ft)

Population (2022 census)
  - City: 155,487
  - Density: 5,547/km^{2} (14,370/sq mi)
- Demonym: Esmeraldeño / Esmeraldeña
- Time zone: UTC-5 (ECT)
- Area code: (+593) 6
- Climate: Aw
- Website: Official website (in Spanish)

Esmeraldas (Spanish pronunciation: [esmeˈɾaldas]) is a coastal city in northwestern Ecuador. It is the seat of the Esmeraldas Canton and capital of the Esmeraldas Province. It has an international sea port and a small airport (IATA location identifier: ESM). Esmeraldas is the major seaport of northwestern Ecuador, and it lies on the Pacific coast at the mouth of the Esmeraldas River. The city is the principal trading hub for the region's agricultural and lumber resources, and is the terminus of the 313-mile (504-km) Trans-Ecuadorian Pipeline from the oil fields in northeastern Ecuador.

Esmeraldas is well known around Latin America given the large number of locals that have historically played in the Ecuador national football team. The main activities of the city are commerce, industry and agriculture. It has beaches with landscapes and a warm climate, which make it one of the most visited tourist destinations in the area.

On 19 December 2016, a 5.8 Richter scale earthquake shook the city of Esmeraldas.

== Economy ==
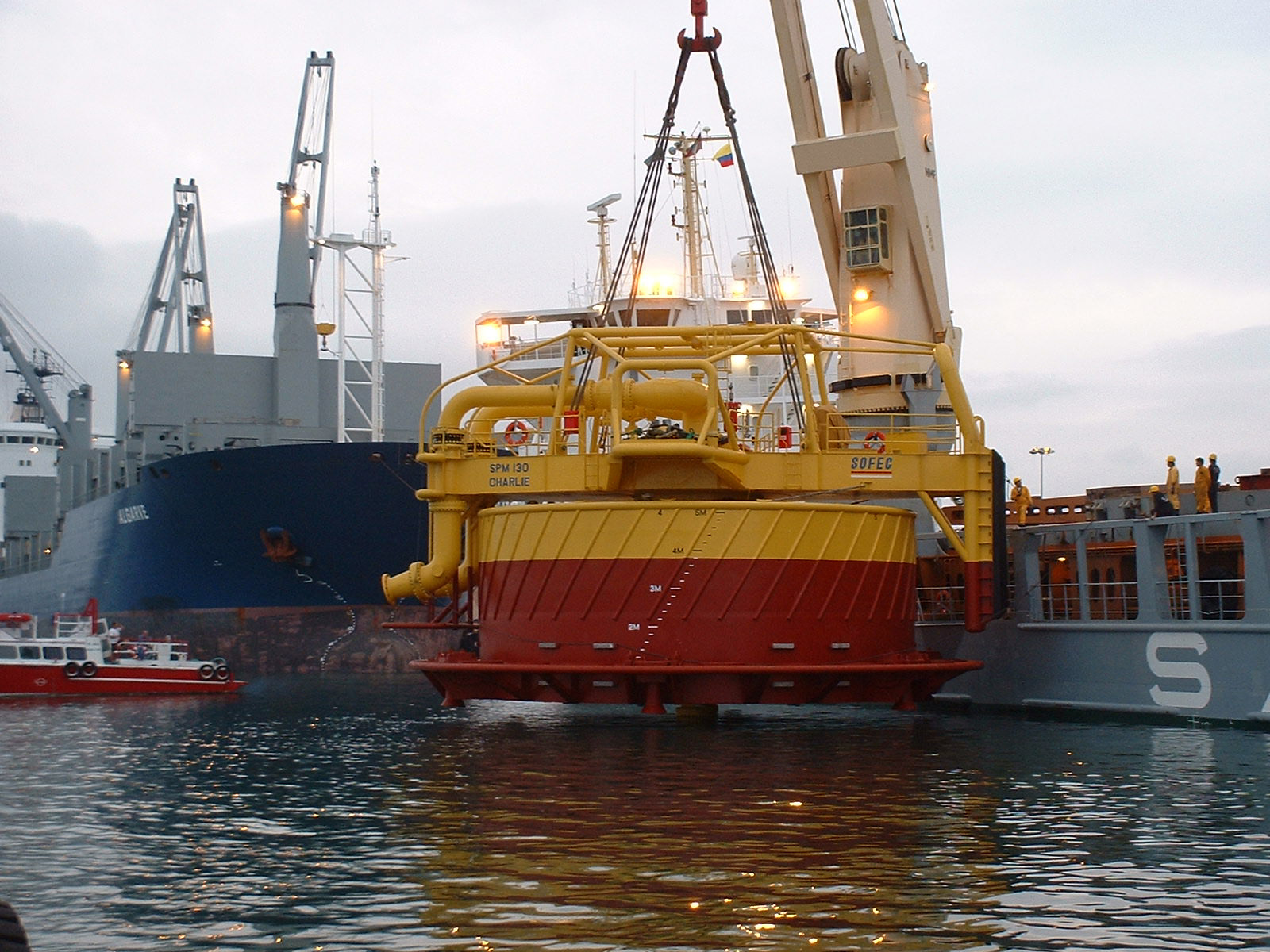
Commercial Port

The port of Esmeraldas is economically important for the northern part of Ecuador, and the port of Balao is an important oil processing facility. Here wood and wood chips are mainly exported; bananas and other agricultural products are also exported.

=== Agriculture and livestock ===
The soil allows the production of rice, maize, African palm, basil and a variety of tropical fruits. Among the main forest species are: chanul, raft, laurel, sande, guayacán, and tangaré. Cattle and pig rearing are also important. The fishing industry is also an important economic indicator of the region, and includes species like corvina, snapper, lisa and tuna.

=== Industry ===
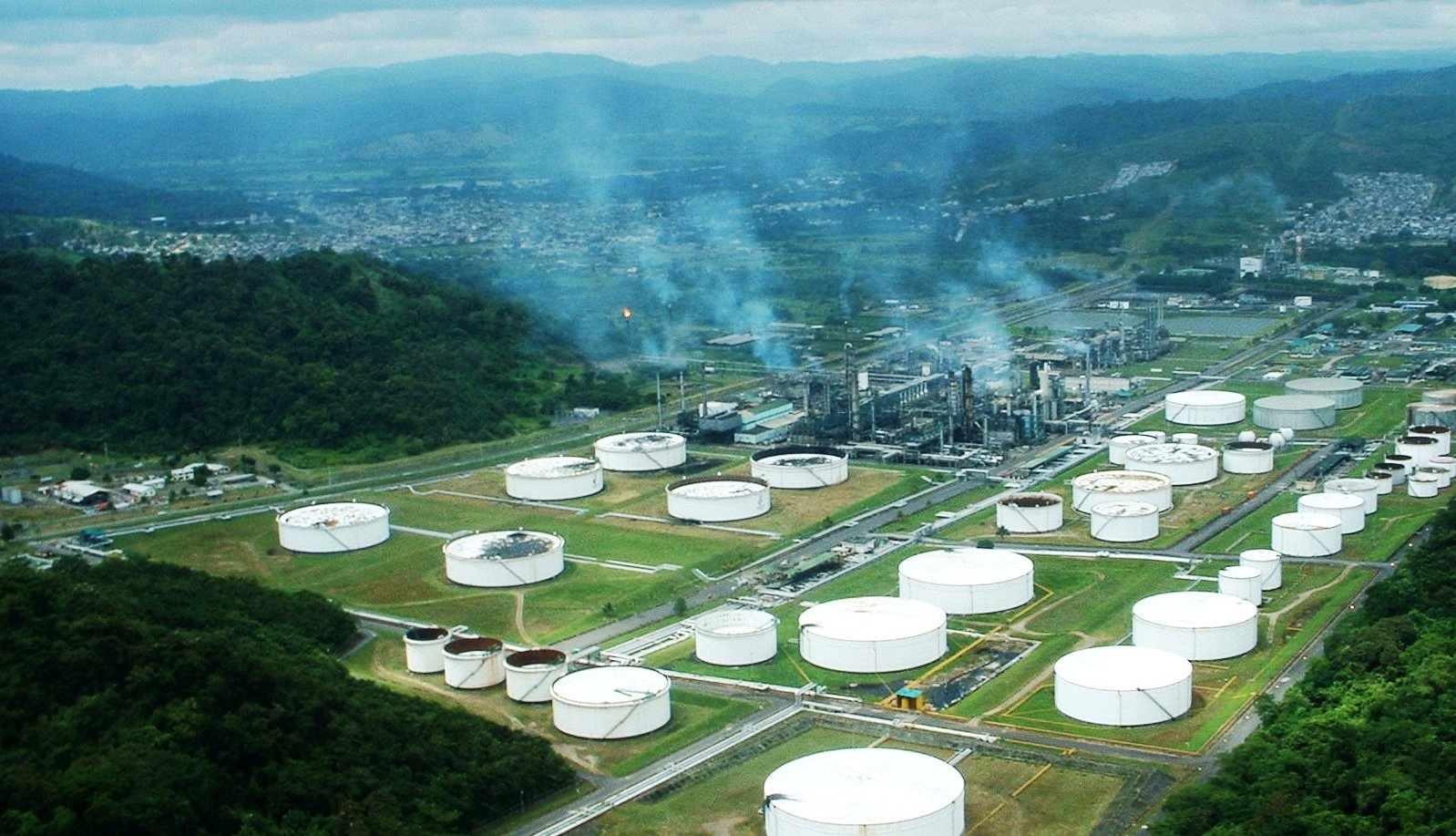
Oil refinery in Esmeraldas

Industry in Esmeraldas consists of manufacturing, timber, chemicals and oil. Concerns exist about forest management and deforestation in the Chaco rainforest.

The trans-Andean pipeline was completed in August 1972, connecting the Oriente reserves to refining facilities in Esmeraldas, and the oil industry is the largest employer. In 1987, the refinery was expanded for the first time to 90,000 barrels per day (14,000 m^{3}/d). The second expansion, to 110,000 barrels (17,000 m^{3}), occurred in 1995. The plant is currently running at 80 percent capacity with hopes to return to full capacity by 2014. The petrol produced there is used for mixtures because of its high aromaticity.

== Climate ==
Like most of the Ecuador coast, Esmeraldas has a hot semi-arid climate (Köppen BSh) with a wet season from January to April, a dry season from May to December, and consistently very warm to hot and cloudy weather due to fog from the Humboldt Current.

Climate data for Esmeraldas (Tachina), elevation 8 m (26 ft), (1971–2000)
Month	Jan	Feb	Mar	Apr	May	Jun	Jul	Aug	Sep	Oct	Nov	Dec	Year
Mean daily maximum °C (°F)	28.8 (83.8)	29.0 (84.2)	29.3 (84.7)	29.3 (84.7)	29.1 (84.4)	28.7 (83.7)	28.4 (83.1)	28.5 (83.3)	28.5 (83.3)	28.6 (83.5)	28.7 (83.7)	28.5 (83.3)	28.8 (83.8)
Mean daily minimum °C (°F)	22.3 (72.1)	22.4 (72.3)	22.6 (72.7)	22.5 (72.5)	22.7 (72.9)	22.4 (72.3)	22.0 (71.6)	21.8 (71.2)	21.7 (71.1)	21.9 (71.4)	22.0 (71.6)	22.2 (72.0)	22.2 (72.0)
Average precipitation mm (inches)	89.0 (3.50)	89.0 (3.50)	143.0 (5.63)	74.0 (2.91)	53.0 (2.09)	34.0 (1.34)	21.0 (0.83)	14.0 (0.55)	15.0 (0.59)	10.0 (0.39)	11.0 (0.43)	22.0 (0.87)	575 (22.63)
Average relative humidity (%)	82	85	84	83	83	83	82	80	81	80	79	80	82
Source: FAO

== Tourism ==
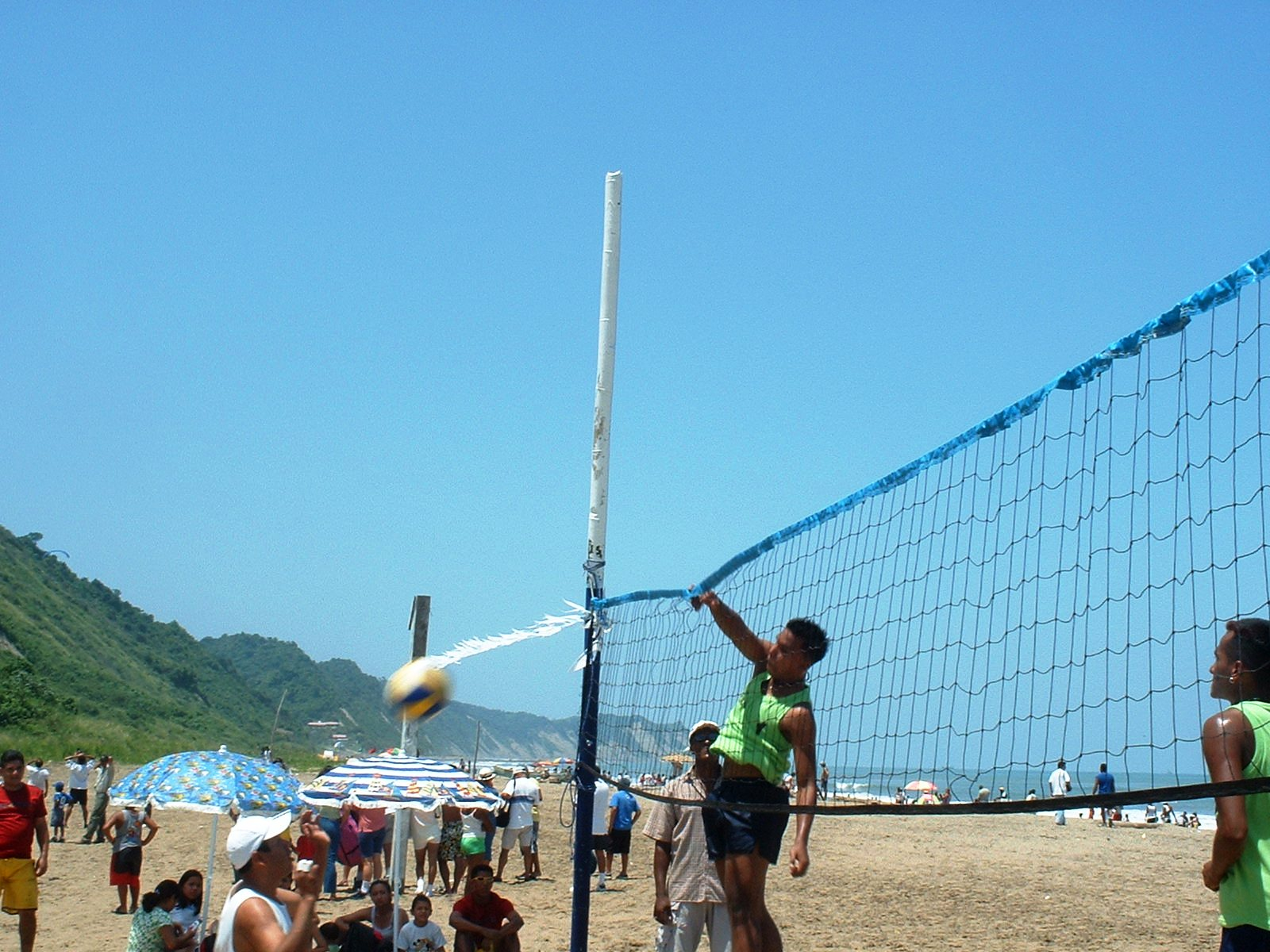
Las Palmas Beach

Tourist attractions include beaches, virgin forests, the culture of the indigenous Cayapas people, marimba and Afro-Ecuadorian music and the La Tolita archaeological zone. Other attractions include Atacames, famous for the "crazy coconut" (coco-loco, traditional drink made with coconut water) and its handicrafts in black and red coral. Same, an area of large palms and serene blue waters; Muisne, with pristine beaches of warm sand inhabited by red crabs in a tropical atmosphere; Quinindé, with vast African palm trees and guadúa houses; and Tonsupa, famous for its sunsets.

The U.S. State Department advises not to travel to the northern border region of Ecuador, including the northern part of Esmeraldas, due to crime.

== Infrastructure ==
The main road runs along the coast by joining La Tola, Lagarto, Montalvo, Rocafuerte, Río Verde, Camarones, Tachina y San Mateo. Other routes are: Esmeraldas – Atacames – Súa – La Unión – Muisne – Esmeraldas – Quinindé (Rosa Zarate) that lead to Santo Domingo and Quito. The Quito – San Lorenzo rail network is still in use.

The Carlos Concha Torres International Airport has offered both national and international services to Cali, Colombia.

== Notable people ==
- Francisco de Arobe (born 1543), mulatto chief
- Pervis Estupiñán (born 1998), footballer for AC Milan
- Nexar Antonio Flores (born 1978), Ecuadorian-Finnish artist
- Piero Hincapié, footballer for Arsenal F.C.
- Darwin Rivas (born 1990), footballer
- Enner Valencia (born 1989), footballer who currently plays for Fenerbahçe and captains the Ecuador national team.
- Gustavo Vallecilla (born 1999), footballer for Columbus Crew, on loan from Colorado Rapids.

== See also ==
- Esmeraldeño language, formerly spoken in the city
