= Darwin Rivas =

Ecuadorian footballer (born 1990)

Personal information
- Full name: Darwin David Rivas Ferrin
- Date of birth: January 12, 1990 (age 36)
- Place of birth: Esmeraldas, Ecuador
- Position: Defender

Team information
- Current team: Barcelona

Youth career
- 2006–2008: Selección de Sucumbíos
- 2009: Caribe Junior
- 2010–: Barcelona

Senior career*
| Years | Team | Apps | (Gls) |
| 2010– | Barcelona | 2 | (0) |
- * Club domestic league appearances and goals as of 28 September 2010

Darwin David Rivas Ferrin (born January 12, 1990) is an Ecuadorian football defender who played for Barcelona.

== See also ==
- Football in Ecuador
- List of football clubs in Ecuador
