= Echeandía =

- Town
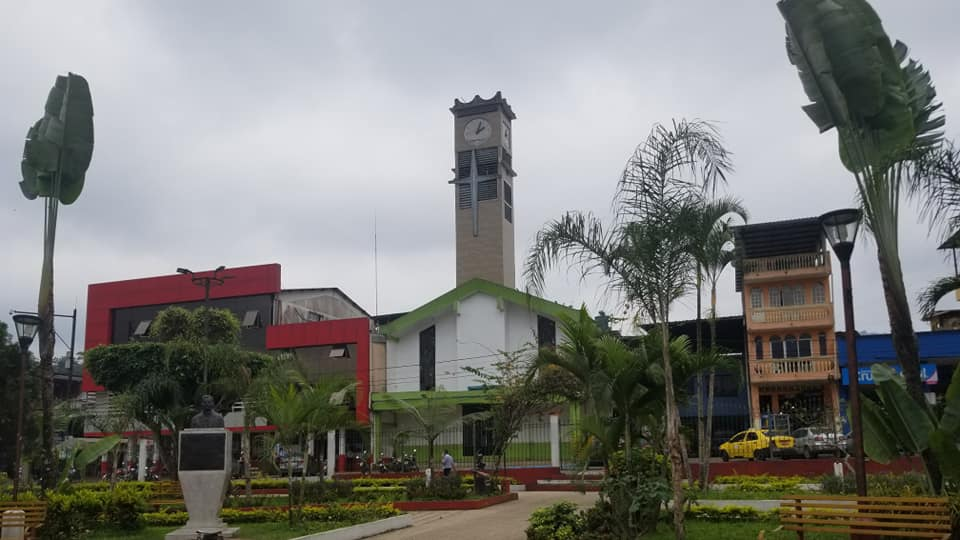
- Iglesia de San Vicente Ferrer in Echeandía

- Location within Ecuador
- Coordinates: 01°26′0″S 79°16′0″W
- Country: Ecuador
- Province: Bolívar Province
- Canton: Echeandía Canton

Government
  - Mayor: Luis Enrique Escudero Santamaría

Area
  - Town: 1.51 km^{2} (0.58 sq mi)

Population (2022 census)
  - Town: 7,138
  - Density: 4,730/km^{2} (12,200/sq mi)
- Time zone: ECT
- Climate: Aw
- Website: gobiernodebolivar.gov / Echeandía

Echeandía is a town in the Bolívar Province, Ecuador. It is the seat of Echeandía Canton.
