= The Mulattos of Esmeraldas =

1599 painting by Andrés Sánchez Gallque

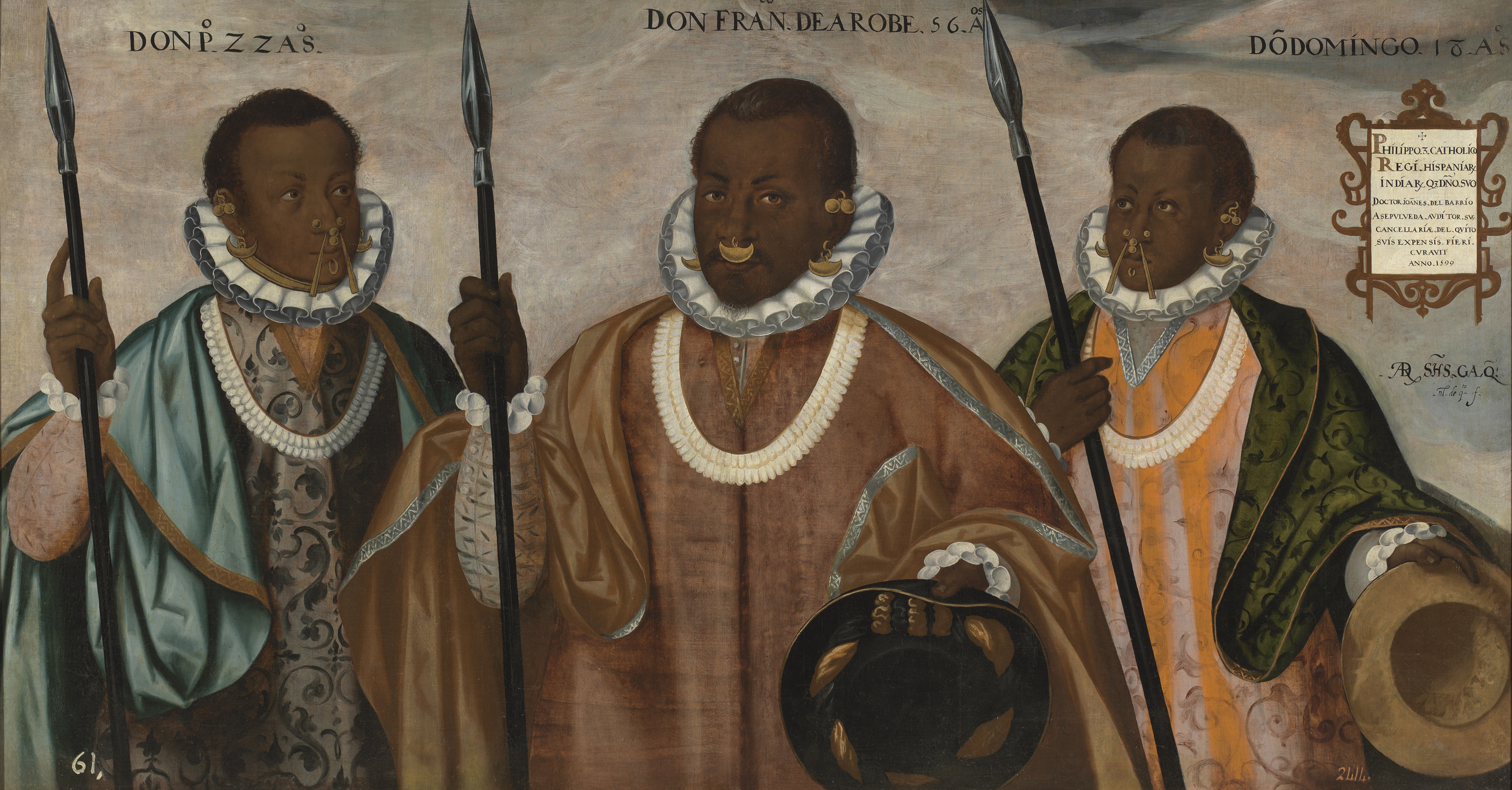
The Mulattos of Esmeraldas

The Mulattos of Esmeraldas, also known as The Black Kings of Esmeraldas or Don Francisco de Arobe and his Sons, Pedro and Domingo, is an oil on canvas work painted in 1599 by the mestizo painter es:Andrés Sánchez Gallque, who belonged to the Quito School. It is the oldest signed and dated painting from colonial South America, especially notable as the artist chose to sign the painting as an indigenous Andean painter. It is currently part of the collection of the Prado Museum in Madrid although it is deposited in the Museo de América.

The work was commissioned by Juan del Barrio de Sepúlveda, judge of the Real Audiencia of Quito, to send to King Philip III of Spain, as proof of the conversion of the so-called Maroons, black slaves who escaped from European ships or were shipwrecked on the coasts of America, who ended up becoming chiefs of indigenous villages and lived as free people. Francisco de Arobe, leader of a Maroon colony on the coast of Ecuador, had traveled with his two sons to Quito in order to commemorate his treaty with Spain.

== Background ==
The Maroons, or "mulatos", of Esmereldas, included several autonomous communities of escaped slaves with mixed African and Indigenous descent. Don Francisco de Arobe, the son of an African slave and a Nicaraguan woman, had escaped inland and founded one such community in Esmereldas. Like other Maroon colonies, his community would have been considered a threat to Spanish authority, as a safe haven for free slaves and an obstacle to expanding Spanish infrastructure. As a result, the Spanish crown repeatedly attempted to subdue them, and eventually de Arobe pledged his loyalty to King Philip III.

This painting commemorates the treaty between Francisco de Arobe and the King of Spain, which kept Esmereldas autonomous but officially "pacified" the coast, meaning that they accepted Spanish rule and converted to Christianity. In exchange, de Arobe was recognized as the governor of Esmereldas; he also received the title of captain. When he traveled to Quito with his sons to acknowledge the new treaty, this painting was commissioned by the judge at Quito, Juan del Barrio de Sepúlveda, for King Philip III.

Due to this history, the painting functions as a symbol of loyalty towards the Spanish crown, demonstrating the 'civilizing' of these men. In the letter to King Philip III that accompanied the painting, del Barrio de Sepúlveda calls Don Arobe and his sons "barbarians." He also refers to these subjects as, translated from Spanish, "very extraordinary things". Cosa extraordinaria was a phrase typically used for objects, brought from the Americas and kept in royal collections as exotic curiosities. In del Barrio de Sepúlveda's letter to King Philip III, he describes de Arobe and his sons but does not mention the painting, implying that his gift to the King is the men themselves, newly conquered. However, the painting also offers a unique early depiction of the lives of Maroons in colonial South America.

The painting was held by the Spanish royal family before it was transferred to the Museo del Prado in the 19th century.

== Description of the work ==
The canvas is composed in the Mannerist style, which reached the Andes around the year 1580 thanks to the arrival of several Italian painters, and executed in oil on a canvas 92 cm high by 175 cm wide. Other scholars point to influences from central Europe in the bright highlights and detailed drapery. The work is unique within the early American colonial context, not only for its quality, but also for the unusual secular theme during an artistic period dominated by religious imagery.

The painting represents Francisco de Arobe, aged 56, and his sons Pedro and Domingo, 22 and 18 years old respectively, who were chiefs of the current Ecuadorian region of Esmeraldas. It was rare to include three figures in a Spanish 16th-century portrait. The title of "Don", applied to all three men, indicates their minor nobility and favor from the crown. The two sons, placed symmetrically, look toward their father, who gazes directly at the viewer. The background is a plain cloudscape, with no geographic detail, which separates the figures from any spatial or geographical context. This sense of distance may intentionally create a segregation in the painting between the subjects and their viewer, the ruler of Spain.

The three subjects wear indigenous uncu tunics over European frilled shirts, and accessorize with Spanish doublets alongside traditional indigenous gold and shell jewelry. The golden adornments seem to be accurate for residents of Esmereldas, a region with abundant gold deposits. These cultural signifiers of mulatto identity exist in tension with their Spanish garments, which include many imported luxuries, including Chinese silks, taffeta, and spears smelted in the African style. Scholars have deduced that del Barron de Sepulveda, the painting's commissioner, paid for these materials himself. Some of these fineries were likely just props for the portrait, to symbolize the reach of Spanish trade. In reality, Spanish decree prohibited all Black people and mulattos from wearing silk or gold.

This portrait represents a moment of colonial exchange and conquest, where these men are assimilated into the Spanish empire, and the tensions around mulatto identity are meant to be resolved. In one corner, a Latin inscription explains that "The doctor Juan del Barrio y Sepúlveda, Judge of the Royal Audience of Quito, had this made at his own expense in the Year 1599, for his Majesty Philip Catholic king of Spain and the Indies." The art historian Thomas Cummins notes that this dedication is isolated by its gilded frame, placing the judge and the king apart from "the pictorial space of the subjects of the portrait, dangerous and uncivilized individuals."

Using Western pictorial language of submission, two of the subjects hold hats in their hands, turned towards the viewer to indicate no concealment of intentions. However, don Arobe gazes boldly towards the viewer, looking neither submissive nor defeated.

Unusually for this colonial period, Gallque signed his own painting with the inscription "ADR SHS GALQ nl. de qto f," an abbreviation for "Andrés Sánchez Gallque, native of Quito, made this." The majority of works from mestizo painters are anonymous, and Gallque is not known to have signed any of his other paintings. Apparently, the fact that it was a commission for the king of Spain provided a unique opportunity to assert himself. Gallque would have had few previous models for how to paint Maroons, and his work is often described as remarkable for its portrayal of their humanity and dignity.
