= Asociacion de Negros Ecuatorianos =

Asociación de Negros Ecuatorianos (ASONE) is a foundation for the Social and Cultural Development of Afro-Ecuadorians in Ecuador. It was established on 30 January 1988. The president as of 2012 was Daniel Cañola.1
