= Wilson Carabalí =

Ecuadorian footballer (born 1972)

Personal information
- Full name: Wilson Iván Carabalí Gonzales
- Date of birth: 11 August 1972 (age 54)
- Place of birth: Guayaquil, Ecuador
- Height: 1.80 m (5 ft 11 in)
- Position: Defender

Team information
- Current team: 9 de Octubre (assistant)

Youth career
- –1990: Calvi FC

Senior career*
Years	Team	Apps	(Gls)
1990–1994	Calvi FC		
1994–1996	Barcelona (Ecuador)	50	(2)
1996–2002	Emelec	193	(6)
2002	Espoli Quito	37	(2)
2003–2004	Deportivo Cuenca	32	(0)
2004–2007	Barcelona (Ecuador)	56	(2)
2006	→ Emelec (loan)	3	(0)
2007–2008	Norte América	12	(0)
2008–2009	Audaz Octubrino	8	(0)
2009–2011	Atlético Audaz	45	(3)
2011–2012	Rocafuerte	36	(0)
2012	Orense SC		
Total		472	(15)

International career
1994–1996	Ecuador	10	(0)

Managerial career
- 2023–: 9 de Octubre (assistant)
- 2023: 9 de Octubre (interim)
- 2023: 9 de Octubre (interim)
- * Club domestic league appearances and goals

Wilson Iván Carabalí Gonzales (born 11 August 1972) is an Ecuadorian football manager and former player who played as a defender. He is the current assistant manager of 9 de Octubre.

== Personal life ==
Wilson Carabalí was born in Guayaquil. He is the father of the also Ecuadorian men's footballers Omar Carabalí and Wilson Carabalí Jr., who serve on the lower of Colo-Colo of Chile.

== Titles ==
- Emelec 2001 and 2002 (Ecuadorian Primera División Championship)
