= Martina Carrillo =

Ecuadorian activist

Martina Carrillo (born c. 1750, died after 1778) was a black Ecuadorian (living in what was then the Viceroyalty of New Granada) activist who defended the rights of black people and fought against slavery. Together with six other slaves of African descent, in 1778 she went to Quito to present her case to the president of the Royal Audience who promised to help them. They were nevertheless punished by whipping, Carrillo receiving 300 strokes. Today she is honored as a national heroine.

== Biography ==
Born around 1750 in the valley of the River Chota in northern Ecuador, she became a slave in the ranch known as La Concepción. In 1778, at the end of January, together with six other black slaves from La Concepción (Pedro Lucumi, Andrés Lucumi, Ambrosia Padilla, Antonio Chalá, Ignacia Quiteño and Irene Luardo), Carrillo went to Quito to present to José Diguja, president of the Royal Audience appointed by the Spanish, a number of complaints stemming from the mistreatment they suffered under the administrator Francesco Aurrecco Eche. These included insufficient food and clothing and the need for days off after working in the fields. Diguja promised there would be improvements and sent them back with a written request to Aurreco Echea that no punishment should be given. Aurreco Echea disregarded the request and punished them all by whipping. Carillo received 300 strokes.

The next day a doctor had to be called to treat Carrillo whose chest had been severed. All the others were seriously injured too and none were able to return to work for at least two weeks. The following April, Andrés Fernández Salvador began to investigate the case, questioning the witnesses at La Concepción. On 12 April, Aurreco Echea was arrested and on 14 July fined 200 peso, 100 of which were shared among the victims.

A monument now stands in the central park of La Concepción honoring the bravery of Martina Carrillo.
