= Francisco de Arobe =

Leader of the Afro-indigenous maroon communities

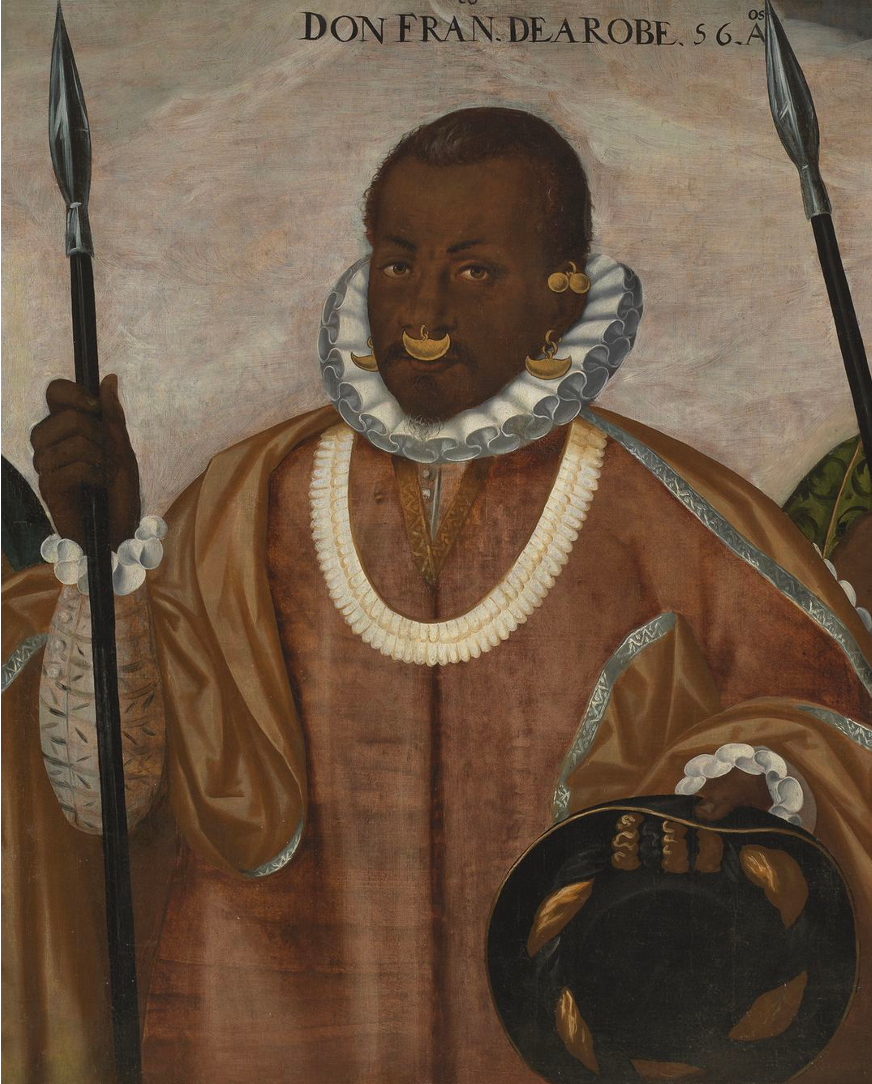
Francisco de Arobe

Francisco de Arobe (Esmeraldas, Viceroyalty of Peru, c. 1543 - Esmeraldas, after 1606) was a leader of the Afro-indigenous maroon communities, also known as zambos, who lived along the coast of Esmeraldas during the early years of the Viceroyalty of Peru, during the period when the Royal Audience of Quito was being founded. He was portrayed by es:Andrés Sánchez Gallque in the famous painting known as The Mulattos of Esmeraldas.

== Early years ==
Francisco de Arobe was the son of a black man named Andrés Mengache from Madagascar and a Nicaraguan indigenous woman of unknown name. Together they had managed to escape from a slave ship anchored on the coast of Esmeraldas. Andrés Mengache founded a maroon community on the coast in the 1550s and 1560. By 1577 he had been killed in disputes with neighbouring Native American communities. His sons Juan and Francisco inherited his leadership role. In that year another maroon leader, Alonso de Illescas sought to bring them under his control. He was unable to do so, even with Spanish help.

This power struggle between the Illescas and the Mangache-Arobe family was made worse by the suspicion that Alonso had murdered Andrés Mangache. The conflict was resolved when Francisco’s brother Juan Mangache married a daughter of the Illescas. The two families accepted each others’ rule in specific areas: the Illescas in Cabo Pasado to the south, and the Arobe in the bay of San Mateo, to the north.

== 1570s ==
Due to the struggle between the indigenous people and the mulattoes, as well as the attempts at alliances between them, there would be several conflicts with two distinct sides. One, led by Illescas and his alliance with indigenous people had a more rebellious character, and the other led by Francisco de Arobe who had a peaceful approach towards the Spanish monarchy in America. This would lead Arobe to adopt the Catholic religion in 1578 and approve the construction of a church in his town, Bahía de San Mateo. Later, at an unknown date, Francisco de Arobe married a woman named Doña Juana and had at least two children.

== 1580s ==
By the 1580s, Francisco and his brother Juan were already dealing directly with the Spanish colonizers. In 1586, Juan traveled repeatedly to Quito, where he received gifts from Governor Rodrigo Díaz de Ribadeneyra in exchange for help in establishing a colony of Spanish settlers in Esmeraldas. In 1589, Arobe placed his community under the religious instruction of the Mercedarian Fray Juan de Salas. Arobe is credited with establishing a church and the town of San Mateo that had been founded by Bartolomé Ruiz de Estrada in 1526. From 1587 to 1598 the Mercedarian friar Onofre Esteban would live in the region and would participate in the evangelization of San Mateo.

== 1590s ==
By the 1590s Francisco de Arobe had become famous for helping shipwrecked people who reached the coast of Esmeraldas.

In 1597 Francisco and his community accepted Christianity and Spanish rule, following efforts by the royal judge Juan Barrio de Sepúlveda who had travelled to Esmeraldas. Following this Francisco de Arobe travelled to Quito in 1599 with two of his sons, Pedro and Domingo, to pledge his loyalty to the Crown. There he would be recognized as governor of the Esmeraldas territory.

In 1600 Captain Pedro de Arévalo sent a report to the president of the Court and judges, outlining the political control that maroons had achieved over the other indigenous communities in Esmeraldas:

The blacks mixed among the Indians and took their rituals, ceremonies and costumes and the women who seemed to them the most important and chieftains and they went about taking over and ruling that land and the Indians [...] they are absolute lords of it and of the said Indians and they command and govern them and no other chieftain or lord of them is known in the said province other than the said blacks who have them divided among themselves by their factions.

A year earlier, in 1598, the missionary Gaspar de Torres, together with Cayapa, Lacha and other Indians from the borders of Lita, arrived in Quito to certify their loyalty and collaboration in the reduction and pacification of Esmeraldas. In 1599, when Francisco arrived with his sons, Pedro and Domingo, they were confirmed as collaborators to pacify the region and evangelize its inhabitants.

== 1600s ==
A 1606 government report described Francisco de Arobe as a mulatto “gobernador” (governor) of a settlement of 35 mulattos and 450 Christian Indians, who were a mix of local people and those displaced from other coastal areas. It also criticised him and his sons for failing to apprehend the instigators of unrest in the coastal communities. Francisco de Arobe threatened to burn his fields and disappear into the forests if the government sent troops to restore order. The official investigating the unrest reported that Francisco de Arobe and his people were drunkards and not true Christians, and that the money spent in Quito on gifts for them had been wasted.
