= Omar Carabalí =

Ecuadorian footballer (born 1997)

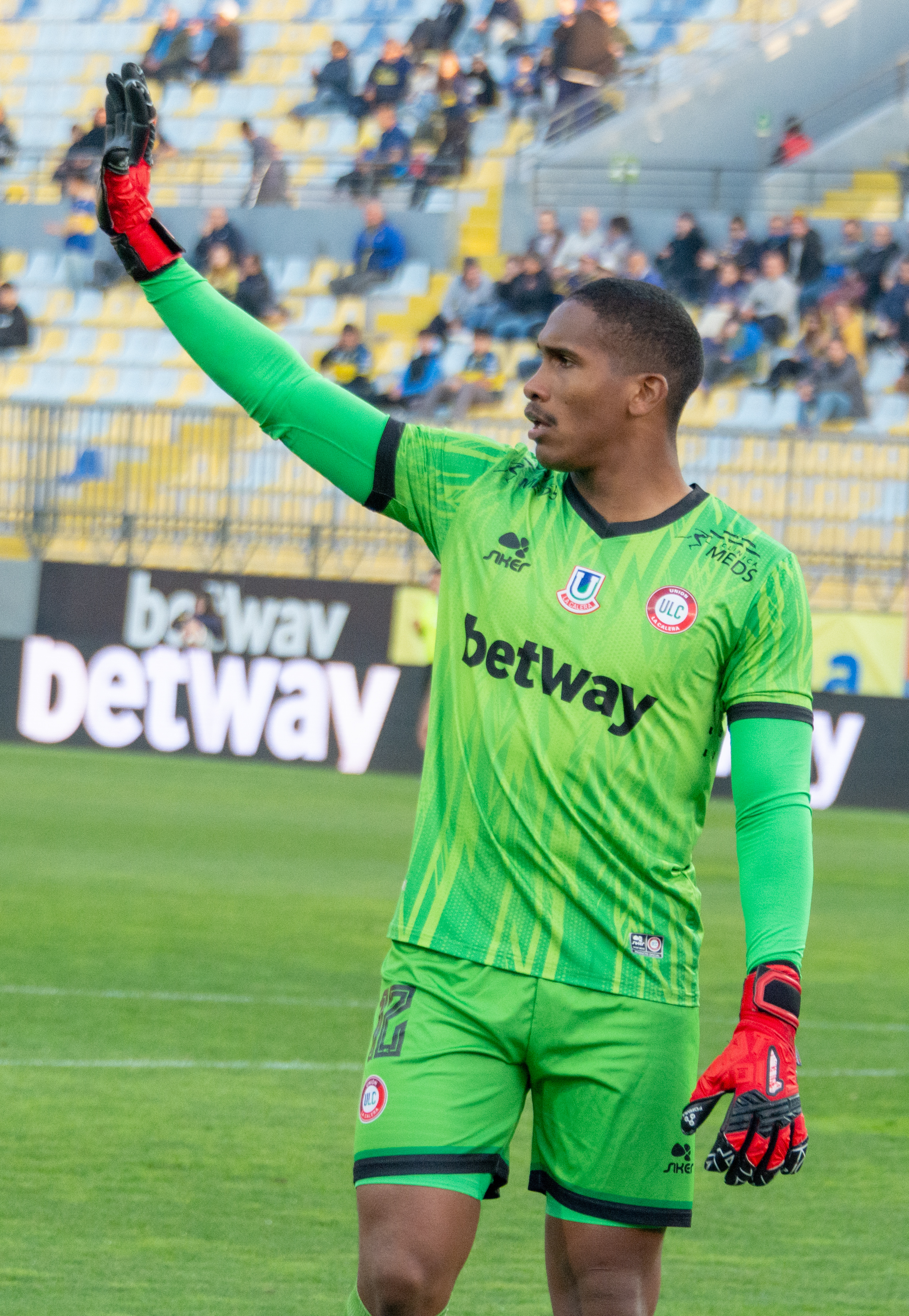
- Carabalí with Unión La Calera in 2023.

Personal information
- Full name: Gabriel Omar Carabalí Quiñónez
- Date of birth: 12 June 1997 (age 29)
- Place of birth: Guayaquil, Ecuador
- Height: 1.87 m (6 ft 2 in)
- Position: Goalkeeper

Team information
- Current team: O'Higgins
- Number: 31

Youth career
- 2012–2013: Independiente José Terán
- 2013–2018: Colo-Colo

Senior career*
Years	Team	Apps	(Gls)
2015–2024	Colo-Colo	7	(0)
2020–2021	→ San Luis (loan)	16	(0)
2023	→ Unión La Calera (loan)	26	(0)
2024	→ Audax Italiano (loan)	0	(0)
2025–	O'Higgins	38	(0)

International career
2017	Ecuador U20	1	(0)
2020	Chile U23	4	(2)
- * Club domestic league appearances and goals as of 19:33, 15 May 2026 (UTC)

Gabriel Omar Carabalí Quiñónez (born 12 June 1997) is an Ecuadorian professional footballer who plays as goalkeeper for Chilean Primera División club O'Higgins. Both a former Ecuador and Chile youth international, he committed to play for the Ecuador national team.

== Career ==
=== Colo-Colo ===
On 2013, he arrived to Colo-Colo from Ecuadorian club Independiente José Terán. He signed his first contract as professional player on 2015 at the age of 18 years being only considered as a substitute on some matches. He ended his contract at the end of the 2024 season.

=== San Luis (loan) ===
He was loaned to San Luis de Quillota for all 2020 season.

=== Unión La Calera (loan) ===
For the 2023 season, Carabalí was loaned to Unión La Calera.

=== Audax Italiano (loan) ===
In the second half of 2024, Carabalí was loaned out to Audax Italiano until the end of the season.

=== O'Higgins ===
Carabalí signed with O'Higgins for the 2025 season.

== International career ==
Carabalí was called up for Ecuador U20 to play at the 2017 South American U20 Championship and 2017 FIFA U20 World Cup, but he didn't play any match. So, after his nationalization by permanent residency according to Chilean law, he decided to play for Chile national team.

Carabalí played four matches for Chile U23 at the 2020 Pre-Olympic Tournament, but Chile didn't advance to the second stage. He was later called up for a training microcycle by Chile national team's coach, Reinaldo Rueda.

Carabalí received his first call up to the Chile senior team to play the 2022 FIFA World Cup qualification matches against Uruguay and Colombia on 8 and 13 October 2020 respectively, but he didn't make his international debut at senior level.

On 14 May 2026, Carabalí's request to switch allegiance to Ecuador was approved by FIFA.

== Personal life ==
Carabalí is the son of Wilson Carabalí, a former Ecuadorian international footballer, and brother of Wilson Carabalí Jr., who came to Chile along with him looking for an opportunity in Chilean football too. Also, his father is the cousin of the former Ecuadorian international footballer Héctor Carabalí.

== Honours ==
Colo-Colo

- Primera División: 2015-A, 2017-Transición
- Copa Chile: 2016, 2019
