= Alonso de Illescas =

African Maroon leader

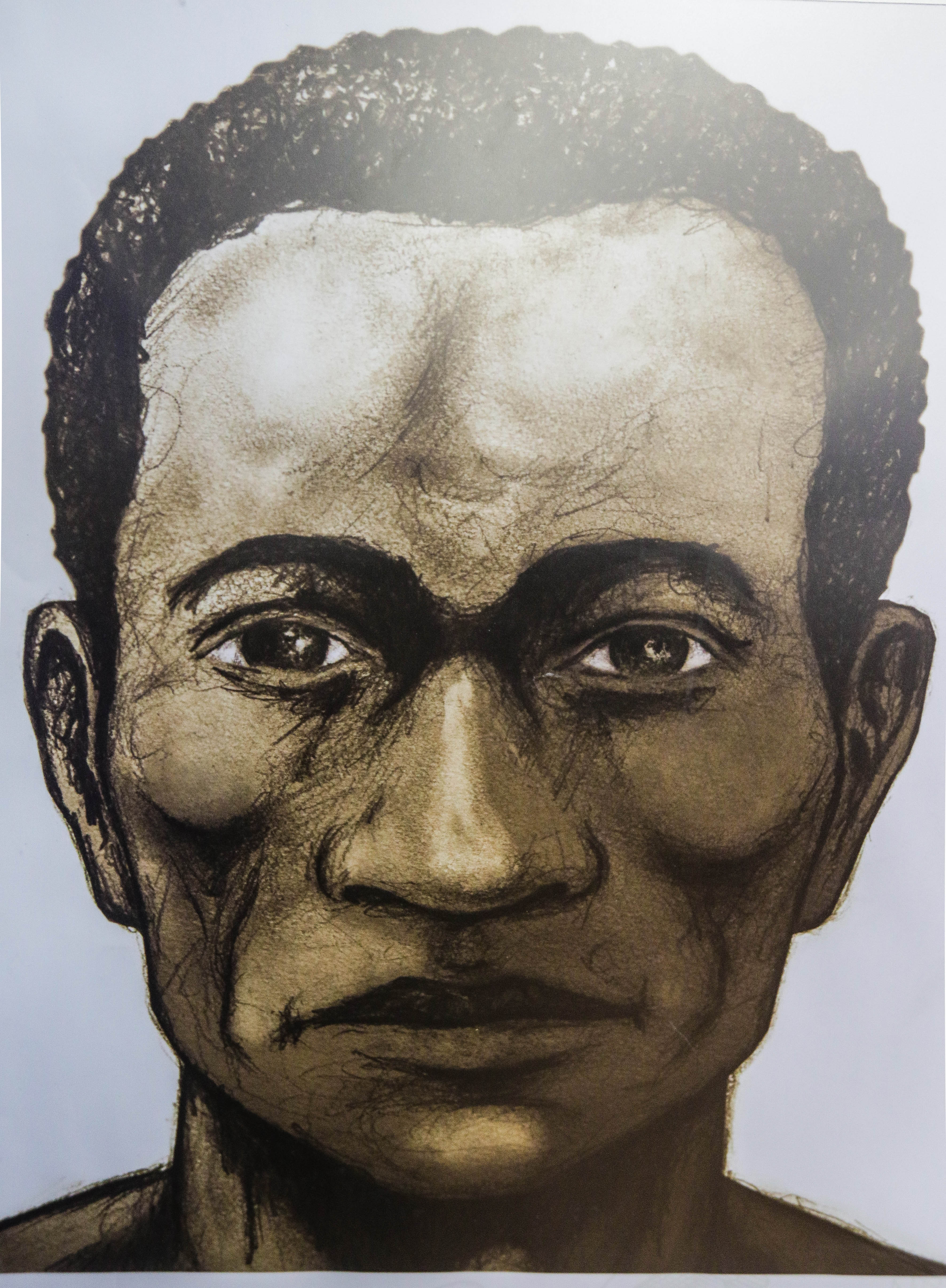
- Born: 1528; Portuguese Cape Verde
- Died: 1600 (aged 71–72); Esmeraldas Province

Alonso de Illescas (fl. 1528–1600s) was an African Maroon leader, perceived as the single most powerful person in the Esmeraldas region of colonial northwestern Ecuador.

== Early life and time in Spain ==
Alonso de Illescas was born around 1528 and raised off the coast of western Africa on either the Cape Verde Islands or the island of Tenerife, a Spanish possession since the 15th century. As a child he was given the name of Enrique; however, he was later confirmed with the name he commonly used, which was also the name of his owner. The location of his homeland made it ideal as a slave-trading post, and between the ages of eight and ten years old he was taken to Seville, Spain where he served as a slave to one of the city's richest and most prominent merchant families, the Illescas. It was during this time he learned the Spanish language, religion, culture, and traditions. More specifically, he learned the Spanish style of formal address, how to play the vihuela (Spanish guitar), and became versed in Catholic prayers and learned the sacraments. He lived in Seville for seventeen years before he was sent to the Caribbean to assist his owners. He first spent time on the island of Santo Domingo where his owners established a merchant enterprise which included clothing, cured meats, swords, horses, olive oil, wine, and the selling of Africans.

In contrast to the lives of other Africans who were brought to the Americas as slaves, Illescas more than likely never worked on a sugar plantation or in a rice field. Instead, he was a trusted personal servant expected to perform many duties for his owners and probably served as elder Illescas' personal servant during his youth in Seville. From the Indies he traveled to Panama and then to Peru, the silver-producing capital of the early Spanish Empire. Records indicate that he and Alvaro, one of his owners, were active in Peru by 1551. In 1553, he along with twenty-three "Guinea slaves" departed the port of Panama on the southbound journey to Lima, Peru. The journey proved to be typical in that the ship's pilot had to contend with north and westerly Pacific Ocean currents and therefore decided to seek harbor in San Mateo Bay on the Esmeraldas coast. In spite of this, the ship ran aground inside the bay and stranded the crew, passengers, and slaves onshore. They were forced to travel along ragged shorelines to reach the nearest settlement, Puerto Viejo. In the course of the journey, Illescas and the other slaves decided to seize the moment to head into dense forest and claim their freedom. None of the crew or passengers ever reached Puerto Viejo.

== Life in Esmeraldas ==
Illescas, along with his fellow escapees, struggled to survive at first, making alliances with and attacks against native communities. The first leader of the group was an African named Antón. It is not quite clear what the exact fate of Antón was; however, historian Charles Beatty Medina offers two theories as to what became of him. One is that he died in battle and the other is he was ostracized from the community and might be the same person who was taken and executed as a sorcerer by Spanish soldiers in the 1580s. Illescas eventually rose to a position of leadership by way of alliances that he struck with the local Nigua indigenous communities. He officially became the leader of his Maroon community in the late 1560s. Throughout the rest of the sixteenth century under his leadership, the community came to include Amerindians and even a few Europeans. Examples include the Trinitarian friar named Alonso de Espinosa, who served as a minister at the request of Illescas, and most notably Illescas’ chief assistant, a Portuguese soldier named Gonzalo de Avila, who remained among the Maroons after the unsuccessful military campaign of Martín de Carranza. Similar to other maroon communities, Illescas' communities' inhabitants intermarried with and subjugated native communities, thus allowing him to establish a level of political authority and military power in the region. The African men intermarried with local native women, many formed polygamous partnerships, and their offspring at first were referred to as mulattoes by the Spanish and by the 1590s as zambos.

In the 1570s Illescas' Maroon community also began trading with Spanish ships that periodically stopped on the Esmeraldas coast. However, he had to assert dominance over another group of African Maroons, called the Mangaches that formed after another coastal shipwreck. The region's remote geography with dense forests and mangroves and the indigenous inhabitants' (Campazes who lived south of the Bay of San Mateo) prolonged resistance to Spanish rule helped to enable the Maroon community to survive for generations. Illescas wanted to make peace with Spanish authorities in exchange for official recognition of himself and his community members as free Africans. However, after the Real Audiencia, the Crown Court in Quito, was formed in 1563 and by the urging of its first president, Hernando de Santillán, Spanish merchants asserted their desire for a port closer to Quito for increasing trade with Peru and Panama because of the cost of transporting their goods overland from Guayaquil. Therefore, in 1577 the Real Audienica proposed to appoint Illescas as governor of the region and to give him the honorific title of “Don,” a form of address denoting noble status. This unprecedented honor for an African Maroon was a royal decree that would have made Illescas ruler of the province. In exchange he was supposed to persuade other chieftaincies of the region, along with rival maroon bands, to settle at the mouth of the Esmeraldas River. Illescas’ attempt to do this led to internal warfare between both maroon communities and lowland native societies.

In 1586, Illescas dictated a letter to Espinosa to the Spanish Crown and its authorities in Quito and Madrid. He petitioned the King of Spain to rescind the grant that Rodrigo de Ribadeneyra, a wealthy merchant, had received in 1585 to establish settlements in Esmeraldas. Instead of having outsiders come in, he offered to “pacify” his native neighbors. This statement demonstrates how there existed a territorial competition among lowland societies who were vying to dominate both the land and the people who lived there. By examining the letter further, the reader can discover how Illescas, like his fellow African Maroon leaders, formed dynamic relationships with the environment, native societies, and colonial authorities. Nevertheless, the letter was received as little more than a bothersome attempt by Espinosa to delay events that the royal authorities envisioned. Ribadeneyra failed to gain allegiance of Illescas and other Maroon leaders and never was able to create settlements in the region.

== Death and fate of the Maroon community ==
Near the end of Illescas' life, he ruled his community with the help of two sons, Sebastián and Antonio. There is no historical record of Alonso de Illescas after the 1590s. Therefore, he must have died in the Esmeraldas region at some point between 1587 and 1596. While Illescas did not live long enough to witness a peace agreement with the Real Audiencia of Quito, it was achieved. His son Sebastián obtained the title of Don and was recognized as leader over the Illescas Maroons by 1600. In addition, Sebastián received the sacrament of confirmation by Quito's bishop in 1600 and he took Alonso as his confirmation name. Illescas' family ruled Esmeraldas for at least two more generations.

== Legacy ==
In 1997, the National Congress of Ecuador officially declared 2 October as the national day of Black Ecuadorians and thus gave formal recognition to Alonso de Illescas as a national hero.

== See also ==
- Francisco de Arobe
