= CNB Ecuador 2020 =

- Date: May 23, 2020
- Presenters: Tahíz Panus
- Venue: Virtual Selection
- Broadcaster: Instagram
- Entrants: 10
- Placements: 5
- Debuts: Guayaquil; Quito; Zaruma
- Withdrawals: Bolívar; Cañar; Chimborazo; Esmeraldas; Galápagos; Imbabura; Loja; Los Ríos; Morona Santiago; New Model Magazine; Santa Elena; Santo Domingo
- Winner: Ámar Pacheco; Guayaquil

CNB Ecuador 2020 was the first edition of Concurso Nacional de Belleza Ecuador, after Miss World Ecuador pageant was renamed. This pageant selects the representatives to Miss World 2021, Miss Supranational 2021 and Miss Grand International 2020. The pageant was planned to be held on May 23, 2020, in the city of Portoviejo, Manabí; but due to the COVID-19 pandemic, it was cancelled and the pageant was held in a virtual selection where Ámar Pacheco resulted as the eventual winner. Ámar won the title. For obtaining the highest score in the Fast Tracks. The announcement of the results of the selection was made on the same planned date through Instagram. For very first time, the organization allows cities to be represented at the pageant. Among the contestants, the organization selected the representatives to Miss World 2020, Miss Supranational 2020, Miss Grand International 2020 and Miss Intercontinental 2020. The representatives were official crowned in a special ceremony held September 1 on De Casa en Casa TV show. The four contestants were previously chosen in a virtual selection due to the COVID-19 pandemic, was streaming by TC Television. Mariuxi Idrovo, Miss World Ecuador 2019, crowned her successor, Ámar Pacheco at the event. And the others representatives was crowned preceded by Justeen Cruz, Lisseth Naranjo and Paola Zamora.

== Results ==
=== Placements ===
Final results	Contestant
Miss World Ecuador 2020	Guayaquil – Ámar Pacheco
1st Runner-Up	Zaruma - Melissa Aguirre
2nd Runner-Up	Pichincha - Emilia Vásquez
Miss Supranational Ecuador 2020	USA Community - Justeen Cruz
Miss Grand Ecuador 2020	Azuay- Lisseth Naranjo (Dethroned) §

§ Naranjo directly entered into Top 5 after winning Miss Fan Vote

== Contestants ==
Initially, 20 contestants were selected to compete for the title of Miss World Ecuador 2020. But, due to the COVID-19 pandemic, 10 contestants decided not to compete in this edition, postponing their participation until 2021.

Province	Contestant	Age	Height	Hometown
Azuay	Lisseth Estefanía Naranjo Goya	22	1.70 m (5 ft 7 in)	Cuenca
El Oro	Thaíz Magaly Zambrano Lapo	19	1.75 m (5 ft 9 in)	Machala
Guayaquil	Ámar Silvana Pacheco Ibarra	23	1.73 m (5 ft 8 in)	Guayaquil
Guayas	Delary Georgette Stoffers Villón	19	1.80 m (5 ft 11 in)	Guayaquil
Manabí	Marjorie Marlene Vivas Medranda	25	1.72 m (5 ft 7 1/2 in)	Portoviejo
Orellana	María Esther Tuárez Menéndez	22	1.73 m (5 ft 8 in)	Joya de los Sachas
Pichincha	María Emilia Vásquez Larrea	24	1.73 m (5 ft 8 in)	Quito
Quito	María Paula López Cuenca	22	1.72 m (5 ft 7 1/2 in)	Quito
USA Community	Justeen Amberth Cruz Lara	22	1.75 m (5 ft 9 in)	Newark
Zaruma	Melissa Elizabeth Aguirre Tinoco	26	1.70 m (5 ft 7 in)	Quito
