= Miss Universe Ecuador 2025 =

2nd Miss Universe Ecuador pageant

- Date: July 26, 2025
- Presenters: Eduardo Andrade
- Entertainment: Daniel Betancourth
- Venue: Palacio de Cristal de Guayaquil, Guayaquil, Guayas, Ecuador
- Broadcaster: TC Televisión
- Entrants: 19
- Placements: 10
- Withdrawals: Azogues; Babahoyo; Bolívar; Cañar; Esmeraldas; Manabí; Morona Santiago; Tungurahua; Zamora Chinchipe
- Returns: Chimborazo; Imbabura
- Winner: Nadia Mejia; United States

Miss Universe Ecuador 2025 was the second edition of Miss Universe Ecuador pageant under CNB Ecuador. Also, the winner will be the 13th Reina del Concurso Nacional de Belleza Ecuador. Held at the Palacio de Cristal, Guayaquil, Guayas, Ecuador, on July 26, 2025.

Mara Topić of Guayaquil crowned Nadia Mejia of the Ecuadorian Community in the United States. Mejia will represent Ecuador at Miss Universe 2025. Additionally, Samantha Quenedit from Quito won as the Ecuadorian representative to Miss Grand International 2025 on July 18, 2025, during the preliminary competition held in Cuenca.

== Results ==
=== Placements ===
| Placement | Contestant |
|---|---|
| Miss Universe Ecuador 2025 | United States – Nadia Mejia |
| 1st Runner-Up | Tungurahua – Daphne Currat |
| 2nd Runner-Up | Regíon Sierra – Christie Isabel Thermidor |
| Top 5 | Guayaquil – Cristiane Marques; Guayas – Mariola Vejarano |
| Top 10 | Azuay – Lisseth Naranjo; Imbabura – Priscilla Dolores Jijón; Pichincha – Paula Camila Vizcaíno; Regíon Central – Andrea Gura; Santo Domingo – Kenia Ohana Bonilla |

== Contestants ==
19 contestants competed for the title.

| Locality | Contestant | Age (Note: Ages at the time of the pageant) | Hometown |
|---|---|---|---|
| Azuay | Lisseth Estefanía Naranjo Goya | 27 | Cuenca |
| Chimborazo | Gabriela Fernanda Sánchez Núñez | 32 | Riobamba |
| Central Region | Andrea Gura Bravo | 24 | Quito |
| Coast Region | Ariana Valeria Taranto Rodríguez | 35 | Guayaquil |
| Cuenca | María José Otavalo | 28 | Cuenca |
| El Oro | Melanie Janitsy Montaleza Cruz | 29 | Pasaje |
| Europe | Allinson Jácome Cevallos | 20 | Milan |
| Galápagos | Anaí Chantal Degel Jácome | 28 | Puerto Ayora |
| Guayaquil | Cristiane Marques Das Neves | 28 | Guayaquil |
| Guayas | Mariola Vejarano Torres | 28 | Samborondon |
| Imbabura | Priscilla Dolores Jijón Rosero | 25 | Ibarra |
| Los Ríos | Barbara Alexandra Bernal Yánez | 25 | Babahoyo |
| Pichincha | Paula Camila Vizcaíno Pérez | 21 | Quito |
| Quito | Samantha Quenedit Sánchez | 25 | Quito |
| Santo Domingo | Kenia Ohana Bonilla Canchigre | 29 | Santo Domingo |
| Sierra Region | Christie Isabel Thermidor Jativa | 21 | Quito |
| Sucumbíos | Paola Dayana Carrera Castillo | 25 | Nueva Loja |
| Tungurahua | Daphne Christelle Currat Luna | 26 | Baños |
| United States | Nadia Grace Mejía Eicher | 29 | Los Angeles |

=== Withdrawals ===
- Manabí - Ana Cristina Delgado
- Orellana - Kimberly Seme Espinoza
