= Miss Universe Ecuador =

Beauty contest in Ecuador

- Formation: 2024; 2 years ago
- Type: Beauty pageant
- Headquarters: Guayaquil
- Location: Ecuador
- Members: Miss Universe
- Official language: Spanish
- Current titleholder: Dalia Bucaram; Guayaquil
- President: Miguel Panus
- National Director: Tahiz Panus
- Website: www.cnbecuador.com

Miss Universe Ecuador is a beauty pageant and organization that selects Ecuador's official representative to Miss Universe.

The reigning Miss Universe Ecuador is Dalia Bucaram of Guayaquil who was crowned on August 15, 2026, in Guayaquil, Ecuador.

== History ==
Miss Universe Ecuador pageant will be held in 2024 by Concurso Nacional de Belleza Ecuador, with Tahiz Panus as the national director.

== Titleholders ==
- : Declared as Winner
- : Ended as runner-up or top 5/6 qualification
- : Ended as one of the finalists or semifinalists
- : Ended as special awards winner

The winner of Miss Universe Ecuador represents her country at the Miss Universe. On occasion, when the winner does not qualify (due to unforeseen circumstances) a runner-up is sent.

Year	Represented	Miss Universe Ecuador	Placement at Miss Universe	Special Award(s)	Notes
2026	Guayaquil	Dalia Estefanía Bucaram Pazmiño			
2025	Ecuadorian Community in USA	Nadia Grace Mejia Eicher	Unplaced		Previously Miss California USA 2016
2024	Guayaquil	Mara Štefica Topić Verduga	Top 30		Previously Miss Grand Ecuador 2019

== See also ==
- Miss Ecuador
