= Miss Universe Ecuador 2024 =

1st Miss Universe Ecuador pageant

- Date: June 8, 2024
- Presenters: Danilo Carrera; Giovanna Andrade
- Entertainment: Tres Dedos
- Venue: Parque Zoila Ugarte de Landívar, Machala, El Oro, Ecuador
- Broadcaster: TC Televisión
- Entrants: 25
- Placements: 13
- Debuts: Azogues; Babahoyo; Central Region; Cuenca; Sucumbíos; Zamora Chinchipe
- Withdrawals: Chimborazo
- Returns: Azuay; Bolívar; Cañar; Galápagos; Guayas; Morona Santiago; Quito; Sierra Region
- Winner: Mara Topić; Guayaquil
- Congeniality: Camila Orellana; Cuenca
- Best National Costume: Katherine Espín; Cañar

Miss Universe Ecuador 2024 was the first edition of Miss Universe Ecuador pageant under CNB Ecuador. It was held at the Parque Zoila Ugarte de Landívar in Machala, El Oro, Ecuador, on June 8, 2024.

Mara Topić of Guayaquil was crowned as the winner at the end of the event. Topić represented Ecuador at Miss Universe 2024 in Mexico and placed as one of the semifinalists.

== Results ==
=== Placements ===
Placement	Contestant
Miss Universe Ecuador 2024	Guayaquil – Mara Topić
1st Runner-Up	United States – Nadia Mejia
2nd Runner-Up	Cañar – Katherine Espín
Top 6	Coast Region – Shiomara Pico; Los Ríos – Karla Jiménez; Tungurahua – Ana Cobo
Top 13	Esmeraldas – Maholy Ortiz; Guayas – Gissela Flores; Manabí – Fiorella Vélez; Morona-Santiago – Andrea Quito; Pichincha – Carolina Cobo; Quito – Lorena Argüello ✞; Santo Domingo – Yomaira Torales

=== Special awards ===
Award	Contestant
Miss Congeniality	Cuenca – Camila Orellana
Best Hair	Bolívar – Amy Gallegos
Best Skin	Guayas – Gissela Flores
Best Silhouette	Los Ríos – Kala Jiménez
Best Project	Los Ríos – Kala Jiménez
Best Smile	Guayaquil – Mara Topić
Miss OM Dental	United States – Nadia Mejia
Miss Davis	Europe – Angélica Sandoval
Miss Cielo	United States – Nadia Mejia
Miss Venus	Guayaquil – Mara Topić
Miss Belleza Beauty	United States – Nadia Mejia

==== Best National Costume ====
Award	Contestant
Best National Costume	Cañar – Katherine Espín (by Emily Mantuano)
2nd Place	Manabí – Fiorella Vélez (by Wenceslao Muñoz)
3rd Place	Tungurahua – Ana Cobo (by Steven Vera)
4th Place	Bolívar – Amy Gallegos (by Jefferson Vera)

== Contestants ==
Twenty-five contestants competed for the title.

Locality	Contestant	Age (Note: Ages at the time of the pageant)	Hometown
Azogues	Paula Carolina Chérrez González	23	Azogues
Azuay	María José Córdova Abud	22	Cuenca
Babahoyo	Daysi Yamel Laman Dumani	29	Babahoyo
Bolívar	Amy Milena Gallegos Gaibor	23	San Miguel
Cañar	Katherine Elizabeth Espín Gomez	31	La Troncal/Miami
Central Region	Melany Fabiana Flor Serrano	27	Santo Domingo
Coast Region	Shiomara Giselle Pico Mendoza	26	Quevedo
Cuenca	Camila Abigaíl Orellana Martínez	22	Cuenca
El Oro	Melanie Anahí Morales Bustamante	20	Machala
Esmeraldas	Lilibeth Maholy Ortiz Quintero	24	Esmeraldas
Europe	Angélica Sandoval García	27	Moscow
Galápagos	María José Córdova Guerrero	26	Puerto Ayora
Guayaquil	Mara Štefica Topić Verduga	29	Guayaquil
Guayas	Gissela Piedad Flores Cadena	32	El Triunfo
Los Ríos	Karla Paulette Jiménez Urrutia	25	Ventanas
Manabí	Jessie Fiorella Vélez Delgado	25	Bahía
Morona Santiago	Andrea Carolina Quito Torres	31	Macas
Pichincha	Michelle Carolina Cobo Vallejo	29	Quito
Quito	María Lorena Argüello Salazar ✞	26	Quito
Santo Domingo	Yomaira Rafaela Torales Moreira	25	Santo Domingo
Sierra Region	Yajaira Paola Quizhpi Flores	46	Azogues
Sucumbíos	Giulliana Echeverria Carrión	23	Nueva Loja
Tungurahua	Ana Isabel Cobo Vásquez	25	Ambato
United States	Nadia Grace Mejía Eicher	28	Los Angeles
Zamora Chinchipe	María Cristina Polanco Salgado	29	Zamora

== Judges ==
- Alexander González - Coach pageant
- Jeng Young - Entrepreneur
- Jesse Cabalza - Producer and pageant aficionado
- Antonio Salazar - Talent Manager
- Marco Lopez-Miller - Businessman
