= Miss World Ecuador 2017 =

- Date: July 22, 2017
- Presenters: Danilo Carrera; Andrea Villacrés
- Venue: Juan Montalvo Park, Machala, El Oro, Ecuador
- Broadcaster: GamaTV
- Entrants: 15
- Placements: 8
- Debuts: Chimborazo; Orellana; Pastza
- Withdrawals: Bolívar; Carchi
- Returns: Cotopaxi; Morona Santiago; Tungurahua
- Winner: Romina Zeballos; Guayas

Miss World Ecuador 2017 was the 5th Miss World Ecuador pageant, held at the Juan Montalvo Park in Machala, El Oro, Ecuador, on July 16, 2017.

Mirka Cabrera of El Oro crowned Romina Zeballos Avellán of Guayas as her successor at the end of the event. The contest was directed by Tahíz Panús, and Julián Pico was the general producer. A guest star was Yaritza Reyes, who represented the Dominican Republic at Miss World 2016 in Washington, D.C. in 2016.

== Results ==
=== Placements ===
Placement
Contestant
Miss World Ecuador 2017
- Guayas – Romina Zeballos
1st Runner-Up
- Pastaza – Nicolette Ćorić
2nd Runner-Up
- Esmeraldas – Alexandra Zambrano
Top 8
- El Oro – Jenny Suriaga
- Manabí – Gabriela Peláez
- Morona Santiago – Sunny Vásconez
- Santa Elena – Andrea García
- Tungurahua – Valeria Ocaña

== Contestants ==
Country	Contestant	Age	Height (cm)	Height (ft)	Hometown
Azuay	Juliana González Bermeo	18	173	5'8"	Cuenca
Chimborazo	Katherine Jossette Valverde Jardín	24	170	5'7"	Riobamba
Cotopaxi	Katherine Abigaíl Velasco Bastidas	19	174	5'8"	Latacunga
El Oro	Jenny Jazmín Suriaga Suárez	23	171	5'7"	Pasaje
Esmeraldas	Rita Alexandra Zambrano Salazar	24	168	5'6"	Muisne
Galápagos	María Belén Pacheco Cuesta	20	170	5'7"	Puerto Ayora
Guayas	Romina Zeballos Avellán	25	172	5'8"	Guayaquil
Los Ríos	Roxana Davidia Olvera Jalón	19	167	5'6"	Quevedo
Manabí	María Gabriela Peláez Monsalve	18	170	5'7"	Portoviejo
Morona Santiago	Sunny Massiel Vásconez Cárdenas	25	170	5'7"	Méndez
Orellana	Joselyn Lissette Villamar Mendoza	25	181	5'11"	El Coca
Pastaza	Sabine Nicolette Ćorić Hernández	22	167	5'6"	Shell
Pichincha	Johanna Carolina Maldonado Villagrán	22	178	5'10"	Quito
Santa Elena	Andrea Estefanía García Yungasaca	21	171	5'7"	Salinas
Tungurahua	Valeria Estefanía Ocaña Escobar	25	171	5'7"	Ambato
