= Miss World Ecuador 2019 =

- Date: April 27, 2019
- Presenters: Harry Levy and Laritza Párraga
- Venue: Teatro Centro Cívico Eloy Alfaro, Guayaquil, Guayas
- Broadcaster: TC Televisión
- Entrants: 19
- Placements: 9
- Debuts: Guayaquil and USA Community
- Withdrawals: Tungurahua
- Returns: Bolívar, Chimborazo, Galápagos, and Orellana
- Winner: María Auxiliadora Idrovo; Guayaquil

Miss World Ecuador 2019, the 7th edition of the Miss World Ecuador was held on April 27, 2019, in Guayaquil, Ecuador. Nicol Ocles from Imbabura crowned her successor María Auxiliadora Idrovo as Miss World Ecuador 2019. María Auxiliadora Idrovo competed at Miss World 2019. Among the finalists, the representatives to Miss Supranational, Miss Grand, and Miss Intercontinental were selected.

== Results ==
=== Placements ===
Final results
Contestant
Miss World Ecuador 2019
- New Model Magazine - María Auxiliadora Idrovo
1st Runner-up
- Morona Santiago - Andrea Quito
2nd Runner-up
- Manabí - María Fernanda Yépez
Top 9
- Chimborazo - Cinthia López
- El Oro - Ruth Maldonado
- Esmeraldas - Sugey Delgado
- Galápagos - Maria Jose Cordova
- Guayas - Paola Zamora
- U.S. Ecuadorian community - Mara Topić

== International representation ==
Contestants	Pageant	Venue	International Placement	Awards and Special achievements
New Model Magazine - Maria Auxiliadora Idrovo	Miss World 2019	United Kingdom, London	Unplaced	Top 30 Beauty With a Purpose
Manabí - Fernanda Yépez	Miss Supranational 2019	Poland, Silesia	Unplaced	Top 16 Miss Supra Challenge
USA Community - Mara Topić	Miss Grand International 2019	Venezuela, Caracas	Top 10	Top 10 Pre-Arrival Fan Vote; Desfiles de modes:Coronas honorables de Venezuela; Best National Costume
Santo Domingo - Camila Valencia	Miss Intercontinental 2019	India, New Delhi	Unplaced	
Pichincha - Samantha Orellana	Miss Multinacional 2020	India		

=== Fast Track ===
Award
Contestant
Miss Congeniality
- Azuay - Ángeles Angüisaca
Miss Photogenic
- New Model Magazine - María Auxiliadora Idrovo
Miss Punctuality
- Orellana - Diana Mejía
Miss Cielo (Best Body)
- USA Community - Mara Topić
Miss Catwalk
- Galápagos - María José Córdova
Miss Hair
- Guayas - Paola Zamora
Miss Sport
- Bolívar - María José Ledesma
Miss Top Model
- USA Community - Mara Topić
Miss Multimedia
- Morona Santiago - Andrea Quito
Miss Talent
- Morona Santiago - Andrea Quito
Miss Head to Head
- Chimborazo - Cinthia López
Beauty With a purpose
- USA Community - Mara Topić
Beach Beauty
- Guayas - Paola Zamora
Best in Dances of Ecuador
- New Model Magazine - María Auxiliadora Idrovo

== Contestants ==
Province/City	Contestant	Age	Height (cm)	Hometown
Azuay	María de los Ángeles Angüisaca Paredes	19	168	Cuenca
Bolívar	María José Ledesma Quintanilla	25	168	Caluma
Cañar	Joselin Pilar Guizado Infante	21	168	Azogues
Chimborazo	Cinthia Paola López Borja	25	173	Pallatanga
El Oro	Ruth Isabel Maldonado Flores	25	175	Machala
Esmeraldas	Sugey Elizabeth Delgado Angulo	22	173	Esmeraldas
Galápagos	María José Córdova Guerrero	22	176	Puerto Baquerizo Moreno
Guayas	Paola Belén Zamora Macías	22	175	Guayaquil
Imbabura	Patricia Naomi Cárdenas Iturralde	22	170	Ibarra
Loja	Jaidy Jamileth Saavedra Bustamante	19	171	Calvas
Los Ríos	Kelly Minoska Escobar Tomalá	23	168	Quevedo
Manabí	María Fernanda Yépez Montesdeoca	26	176	Manta
Morona Santiago	Andrea Carolina Quito Torres	26	163	Macas
New Model Magazine	María Auxiliadora Idrovo Quintana	17	172	Playas
Orellana	Diana Elizabeth Mejía Vaicilla	22	173	Joya de los Sachas
Pichincha	Samantha Carolina Orellana López	25	170	Quito
Santa Elena	Susan Brigitte Toledo Arízaga	19	170	Santa Elena
Santo Domingo	Camila Dayana Valencia Andrade	21	175	Santo Domingo
U.S. Ecuadorian community	Mara Štefica Topić Verduga	24	177	Los Angeles
