= Mara Topić =

Ecuadorian beauty pageant titleholder

Mara Topic
- Born: Mara Stefica Topic Verduga; 18 March 1996 (age 30); Guayaquil, Ecuador
- Height: 1.77 m (5 ft 10 in)
- Beauty pageant titleholder
- Title: Miss Grand Ecuador 2019; Miss Universe Ecuador 2024
- Hair color: Brown
- Eye color: Hazel
- Major competitions: Miss World Ecuador 2019; (Top 9); Miss Grand International 2019; (Top 10); (Best National Costume); Miss Universe Ecuador 2024; (Winner); Miss Universe 2024; (Top 30)

Mara Stefica Topic Verduga is an Ecuadorian actress, director, producer, tv host and beauty pageant titleholder. She was crowned Miss Universe Ecuador 2024 and represented Ecuador at Miss Universe 2024. Topic is the only Miss Universe Ecuador titleholder to have been hired by the Miss Universe Organization for official roles both during and after her reign. Her work spans television, film, music videos, fashion, pageantry and live entertainment.

She previously won Miss Grand Ecuador 2019, and represented Ecuador at Miss Grand International 2019, where she finished in the top ten.

== Early life and education ==
Mara Stefica Topic Verduga was born in Guayaquil, to an Ecuadorian mother and a Ecuadorian father. At the age of 17, she moved to Los Angeles, California. Her eldest brother Jan Topić is a former Ecuadorian presidential candidate for the 2023 Ecuadorian general election.

== Career ==
Topic has worked as an actress, director, producer, model and television presenter. As an actress, she has held lead roles in three films and has also appeared in Law & Order.

Her entertainment credits include work on Daddy Yankee’s “Con Calma” music video and Rauw Alejandro’s “Tattoo” music video. She later expanded into television, including competing on MasterChef Celebrity Ecuador and co-hosting Escape Perfecto Ecuador on Teleamazonas.

Topic has also continued working with the Miss Universe Organization beyond her participation as a contestant. She hosted Miami Swim Week 2025 in English and Spanish, represented the Miss Universe Fashion Lab during New York Fashion Week 2025, and later served as a judge at an event connected with the organization. She is the only Miss Universe Ecuador titleholder to have been hired by the Miss Universe Organization for official roles during and after her reign.

On April 27, 2019, Topic represented the US Ecuadorian community at Miss World Ecuador 2019, where she reached the top nine and won several awards during the final. In May, 2019 she was appointed Miss Grand Ecuador 2019, by CNB Ecuador.

On October 25, 2019, Topić represented Ecuador at Miss Grand International 2019, and reached the top 10. She was the first Ecuadorian to win Best National Costume at the pageant.

Topic won the first Miss Universe Ecuador on June 8, 2024, representing Guayaquil, and represented Ecuador at Miss Universe 2024 in Mexico on November 16, 2024, where she placed in the Top 30, ending a 10-year drought for the country.

Awards and achievements
Preceded by Blanca Arambulo	Miss Grand Ecuador; 2019	Succeeded by Sonia Luna
Preceded by Delary Stoffers	Miss Universe Ecuador; 2024	Succeeded by Nadia Mejia
