= Miss World Ecuador 2016 =

- Date: October 16, 2016
- Presenters: Ronald Farina
- Venue: Calle 7 Set, Guayaquil, Guayas, Ecuador
- Broadcaster: TC Televisión
- Entrants: 11
- Placements: 5
- Debuts: Carchi; Galápagos
- Withdrawals: Cotopaxi; Loja; Morona Santiago; Santo Domingo; Tungurahua
- Returns: Bolívar; El Oro; Pichincha
- Winner: Mirka Cabrera; El Oro

Miss World Ecuador 2016 was the fourth Miss World Ecuador pageant, held at the Calle 7 Set in Guayaquil, Ecuador, on October 15, 2016.

Camila Marañón of Manabí crowned Mirka Paola Cabrera Mazzini of El Oro as her successor at the end of the event.

== Results ==
=== Placements ===
Placement	Contestant
Miss World Ecuador 2016	El Oro – Mirka Cabrera
1st Runner-Up	Guayas – Andrea Villacrés
2nd Runner-Up	Galápagos – Sharon Maldonado
Top 5	Bolívar – Lissette Sánchez; Los Ríos – Andrea Pendolema

=== Special awards ===
Award	Contestant
Miss Congeniality	Bolívar – Lissette Sánchez
Miss Talent	Azuay – Teresa Espinoza
Beauty With A Purpose	Guayas – Andrea Villacrés
Best in Dances of the World	Los Ríos – Andrea Pendolema

== Contestants ==
Eleven contestants competed for the title.

Province	Contestant	Age	Height (cm)	Height (ft)	Hometown
Azuay	María Teresa Espinoza Verdesoto	20	170	5'7"	Cuenca
Bolívar	Lissette Alejandra Sánchez Matamoros	21	168	5'7"	Guaranda
Carchi	Katherine Lucía Arce Vila	22	173	5'8"	Tulcán
El Oro	Mirka Paola Cabrera Mazzini	22	178	5'10"	Machala
Esmeraldas	Diana Johanna Carlosama Nazareno	24	170	5'7"	Esmeraldas
Galápagos	Sharon Maldonado Rodríguez	23	165	5'6"	Puerto Villamil
Guayas	Andrea Cecilia Villacrés Maldonado	25	175	5'9"	Guayaquil
Los Ríos	Andrea Paulina Pendolema Orozco	19	170	5'7"	Babahoyo
Manabí	Lisbeth Yamileth Peñafiel Castro	18	170	5'8"	Manta
Pichincha	Francesca Valentina Miranda Morrone	21	184	6'0"	Quito
Santa Elena	Ámbar Samira Núñez de la Cruz	23	174	5'8"	Salinas

== Notes ==
=== Debuts ===
- Carchi
- Galápagos

=== Returns ===
Last compete in:

- 2013
  - Bolívar
  - El Oro
- 2014
  - Pichincha

=== Withdrawals ===
- Cotopaxi
- Loja
- Morona Santiago
- Santo Domingo
- Tungurahua

=== Did not compete ===
- Imbabura - María José Villacís Avendaño

== Crossovers ==
- Mirka Cabrera was Reina de Machala 2014. She competed at Reina Mundial del Banano Ecuador 2014 where she was 1st Runner-up; and she competed at Miss Ecuador 2015 where she was unplaced.
- Diana Carlosama was 3rd Runner-up at Reina de Esmeraldas 2013.
- Andrea Villacrés competed at Reina de Guayaquil 2014 where she was 2nd Runner-up, and she was 1st Runner-up at Reina de Guayas 2015.
- María José Villacís competed at Reina de Ibarra 2015 where she was 2nd Runner-up.
- Andrea Pendolema was Reina de Babahoyo 2014.
