= Club Atlético Guayaquil =

Ecuadorean football club

Atlético Guayaquil
- Full name: Club Atlético Guayaquil (Barcelona SC "B")
- Nicknames: "Guayaquileños", "Mini Ídolos"
- Founded: 2005-02-05
- Ground: Estadio Monumental; Isidro Romero Carbo, Tarqui, Guayaquil, Ecuador
- Capacity: 89,932
- Chairman: Ing. Isidro Romero Carbo
- Manager: Hernán Saavedra
- League: Federación Ecuatoriana de Fútbol, Segunda Categoría "A"
- 2004–05: Segunda Categoria "A", 2nd
Home colours	Away colours

The Club Atlético Guayaquil (Barcelona SC "B") is a soccer club based in the Tarqui parish in Guayaquil, Ecuador.

== Overview ==
The club was founded on 5 February 2005.

It is composed of the two divisions under age 18 and under age 20 of the Barcelona Sporting Club, which serve as a kind of farm teams for Barcelona while playing in a lower-division league known as Segunda Categoría "A". The players of the Club Atlético Guayaquil are trained by Peruvian manager Hernán Saavedra so they can later play for Barcelona's main team. They play against teams like Club de Deportes Paladín, Liga Deportiva Universitaria Estudiantil, Asociación Deportiva Naval, Club 9 de Octubre, Círculo Deportivo Everest, Club Sport Patria and Club Sport Norte América.

== Stadium information ==
- Name: Estadio Monumental Isidro Romero Carbo
- City: Guayaquil
- Capacity: 89,932
- Inauguration: December 27, 1987
- Field size: 105 m by 70 m
