= Concurso Nacional de Belleza Ecuador =

Beauty pageant

Concurso Nacional de Belleza
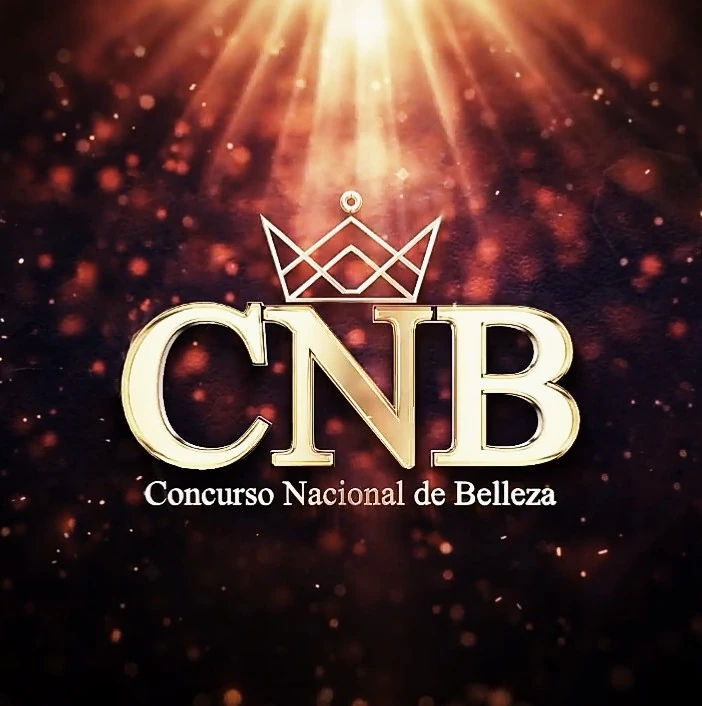
- CNB Ecuador official logo
- Formation: 2013 as Miss World Ecuador 2020 as CNB Ecuador
- Type: Beauty pageant
- Headquarters: Guayaquil
- Location: Ecuador
- Members: Miss Universe (2024); Miss World (2013); Miss Supranational (2018); Miss Grand International (2019)
- Official language: Spanish
- President(s): Tahíz Panus, Miguel Panus
- Website: www.cnbecuador.com

Concurso Nacional de Belleza Ecuador is a national beauty pageant held annually in Ecuador. Initially, the contest was named Miss World Ecuador in 2013 until 2020 when it was renamed Consurso Nacional de Belleza Ecuador. The winner is called Reina del Concurso Nacional de Belleza Ecuador, and she and her runner-ups can be the Ecuadorian representatives at Miss Universe, Miss World, Miss Supranational or Miss Grand International in the year she has been chosen.

== History ==
The first winner elected by Miss World Ecuador organization was Laritza Párraga from Santo Domimgo province through 2013. Although Miss World Ecuador organization has the rights to send a delegate to Miss World, Ecuador has been competing at Miss World since 1960 under the Miss Ecuador beauty pageant, which had the rights until 2012. After Miss Ecuador Organization lost the franchise to Miss World, Julián Pico acquired the rights to send a contestant to the international pageant through the national pageant Miss World Ecuador, starting in 2013. Tahíz Panus acquired the rights for Miss Supranational in 2018 and Miss Grand International in 2019. Therefor, the organization changed its name to Concurso Nacional de Belleza Belleza, and under this name the representatives are selected to compete internationally. Finally, CNB got the license to Miss Universe in 2024.

Representatives from the 24 provinces that make up Ecuador compete annually for the national title of Reina del Concurso Nacional de Belleza Ecuador. Additionally, the winner and runner-ups can be named as Miss Universe Ecuador, Miss World Ecuador, Miss Supranational Ecuador and Miss Grand Ecuador. Furthermore, the organization sent the Ecuadorian's delegate to Miss World Cup 2014 where it placed 2nd Runner-up with the participation of Laritza Párraga.

== International crowns ==
- One – Miss Supranational winner:
  - Andrea Aguilera (2023)

== Titleholders ==
Winners of Miss World Ecuador since 2013 and CNB Ecuador since 2020.

| Edition | Date | Venue | CNB Ecuador Winner | Representation | International |
|---|---|---|---|---|---|
| 2013 | July 4, 2013 | Centro Cultural "Libertador Simón Bolívar", Guayaquil, Guayas | Laritza Libeth Párraga Arteaga | Santo Domingo: Santo Domingo | Miss World 2013: Unplaced |
| 2014 | October 4, 2014 | Parque Lineal de Guayaquil, Guayaquil, Guayas | Virginia Stephannie Limongi Silva | Manabí: Portoviejo | Miss World 2014: Unplaced |
| 2015 | August 1, 2015 | Centro de Convenciones "Simón Bolívar", Guayaquil, Guayas | María Camila Marañón Solórzano | Manabí: Chone | Miss World 2015: Top 20 |
| 2016 | October 16, 2016 | TC Televisión Studios, Guayaquil, Guayas | Mirka Paola Cabrera Mazzini | El Oro: Machala | Miss World 2016: Unplaced |
| 2017 | July 22, 2017 | Parque Central "Juan Montalvo", Machala, El Oro | Romina Carlyn Zeballos Avellán | Guayas: Guayaquil | Miss World 2017: Unplaced |
| 2018 | June 23, 2018 | Teatro Centro Cívico "Eloy Alfaro", Guayaquil, Guayas | Shirley Nicol Ocles Congo | Imbabura: Pimampiro | Miss World 2018: Unplaced |
| 2019 | April 27, 2019 | Explanada del Museo Antropología y de Arte Contemporáneo, Guayaquil, Guayas | María Auxiliadora Idrovo Quintana | Guayas: Playas | Miss World 2019: Unplaced |
| 2020 | September 1, 2020 | TC Televisión Studios, Guayaquil, Guayas | Ámar Silvana Pacheco Ibarra | Guayas: Guayaquil | Miss World 2020: Top 40 |
| 2021 | June 26, 2021 | TC Televisión Studios, Guayaquil, Guayas | Andrea Victoria Aguilera Paredes | Los Ríos: Ventanas | Miss Supranational 2023: Winner |
| 2021 | June 26, 2021 | TC Televisión Studios, Guayaquil, Guayas | Andrea Victoria Aguilera Paredes | Los Ríos: Ventanas | Miss Grand International 2021: 1st Runner-up |
| 2022 | April 30, 2022 | Teatro "Sánchez Aguilar", Samborondón, Guayas | Annie Cecilia Zambrano Campoverde | Santa Elena: Salinas | Miss World 2023: Unplaced |
| 2023 | May 6, 2023 | Malecón "Eloy Alfaro", Quevedo, Los Ríos | Sandra Mariela Alvarado Cobeña | Santo Domingo: Santo Domingo | Miss World 2025: Unplaced |
| 2024 | June 8, 2024 | Parque "Zoila Ugarte de Landívar", Machala, El Oro | Mara Štefica Topić Verduga | Guayas: Guayaquil | Miss Universe 2024: Top 30 |
| 2025 | June 8, 2024 | Placio de Cristal, Guayaquil, Guayas | Nadia Grace Eicher Mejía-Webb | USA Community: Los Angeles | Miss Universe 2025: Unplaced |

== CNB Winners ==
=== CNB Miss Universe Ecuador ===
| Year | Hometown | Miss Universe Ecuador | Placement | Special Award(s) |
|---|---|---|---|---|
| 2025 | Los Angeles | Nadia Grace Mejia Eicher | Unplaced | |
| 2024 | Guayaquil | Mara Štefica Topić Verduga | Top 30 | |

=== CNB Miss World Ecuador ===
| Year | Hometown | Miss World Ecuador | Placement | Special Award(s) |
|---|---|---|---|---|
| 2026 | Pichincha | Samantha Quenedit | TBA | |
| 2025 | Santo Domingo | Sandra Mariela Alvarado Cobeña | Unplaced | |
| 2024 | No competition held | | | |
| 2023 | Salinas | Annie Cecilia Zambrano Campoverde | Unplaced | |
| 2022 | Miss World 2021 was rescheduled to 16 March 2022 due to the COVID-19 pandemic outbreak in Puerto Rico, no edition started in 2022 | | | |
| 2021 | Guayaquil | Ámar Silvana Pacheco Ibarra | Top 40 | Top 27 Miss World Talent; Top 28 Beauty with a Purpose |
| 2020 | Due to the impact of COVID-19 pandemic, no pageant in 2020 | | | |
| 2019 | Playas | María Auxiliadora Idrovo Quintana | Unplaced | Beauty with a Purpose (Top 30) |
| 2018 | Pimampiro | Shirley Nicol Ocles Congo | Unplaced | Top 24 Miss World Sports; Top 30 Dances of the World |
| 2017 | Guayaquil | Romina Zeballos Avellán | Unplaced | |
| 2016 | Machala | Mirka Paola Cabrera Mazzini | Unplaced | Top 21 Miss World Talent |
| 2015 | Chone | Maria Camila Marañón Solórzano | Top 21 | Beauty with a Purpose (Top 10); Top 10 People's Choice Awards |
| 2014 | Portoviejo | Virginia Stephanie Limongi Silva | Unplaced | Top 29 Miss World Sports |
| 2013 | Santo Domingo | Laritza Libeth Párraga Arteaga | Unplaced | Top 33 Miss World Beach Beauty |

=== CNB Miss Supranational Ecuador ===
| Year | Hometown | Miss Supranational Ecuador | Placement | Special Award(s) |
|---|---|---|---|---|
| 2026 | Guayaquil | Kika Marques | Top 24 | |
| 2025 | Ambato | Ana Isabel Cobos | Unplaced | |
| 2024 | Quito | Doménica Angelina Alessi Vega | Unplaced | |
| 2023 | Ventanas | Andrea Victoria Aguilera Paredes | Miss Supranational 2023 | |
| 2022 | Guayaquil | Valery Romina Carabalí Medina | Top 24 (14°) | Top 15 Miss Elegance Top 10 Supra Influencer |
| 2021 | Guayaquil | Justeen Amberth Cruz Lara | Top 24 (16°) | Top 3 Supra Chat - Group 2 |
No pageant was held in 2020 due to COVID-19 pandemic
| 2019 | Manta | María Fernanda Yépez Montesdeoca | Unplaced | |
| 2018 | Guayaquil | Carla Daniela Pardo Thoret | Unplaced (26°) | |

=== CNB Miss Grand Ecuador ===
| Year | Hometown | Miss Grand Ecuador | Placement | Special Award(s) |
|---|---|---|---|---|
| 2025 | Pichincha | Samantha Quenedit Sánchez | Top 22 | |
| 2024 | Valencia | María José Vera Bone | Unplaced | Best National Costume |
| 2023 | Guayaquil | Andrea Cecilia Ojeda Fernández | Unplaced | |
| 2023 | Quito | Véronique Michielsen Marcillo | Resigned | |
| 2022 | Cuenca | Liseth Estefanía Naranjo Goya | Unplaced | |
| 2022 | Quito | María Emilia Vásquez Larrea | Resigned | |
| 2021 | Ventanas | Andrea Victoria Aguilera Paredes | 1st Runner-up | |
| 2020 | Guayaquil | Sonia Augusta Luna Meléndez | Unplaced | |
| 2020 | Cuenca | Liseth Estefanía Naranjo Goya | Resigned | |
| 2019 | Guayaquil | Mara Štefica Topić Verduga | Top 10 | Best National Costume |

== See also ==
- Miss Ecuador
- Miss Grand Ecuador
- Miss Teen Ecuador
- Mister Ecuador
- Miss Earth Ecuador
