= Francisco de Orellana Canton =

- Canton
- Flag

- Location of Orellana Province in Ecuador.

- Cantons of Orellana Province
- Coordinates: 00°28′S 076°58′W
- Country: Ecuador
- Province: Orellana Province

Area
  - Total: 7,049 km^{2} (2,722 sq mi)

Population (2022 census)
  - Total: 95,130
  - Density: 13.50/km^{2} (34.95/sq mi)
- Time zone: UTC-5 (ECT)

Francisco de Orellana Canton is a canton of Ecuador, located in the Orellana Province. Its capital is the town of Puerto Francisco de Orellana. Its population at the 2001 census was 42,010.

== Demographics ==
Ethnic groups as of the Ecuadorian census of 2010:

- Mestizo 59.5%
- Indigenous 26.7%
- Afro-Ecuadorian 6.8%
- White 5.1%
- Montubio 1.7%
- Other 0.3%
