= Tania Tinoco =

Ecuadorian journalist (1963–2022)

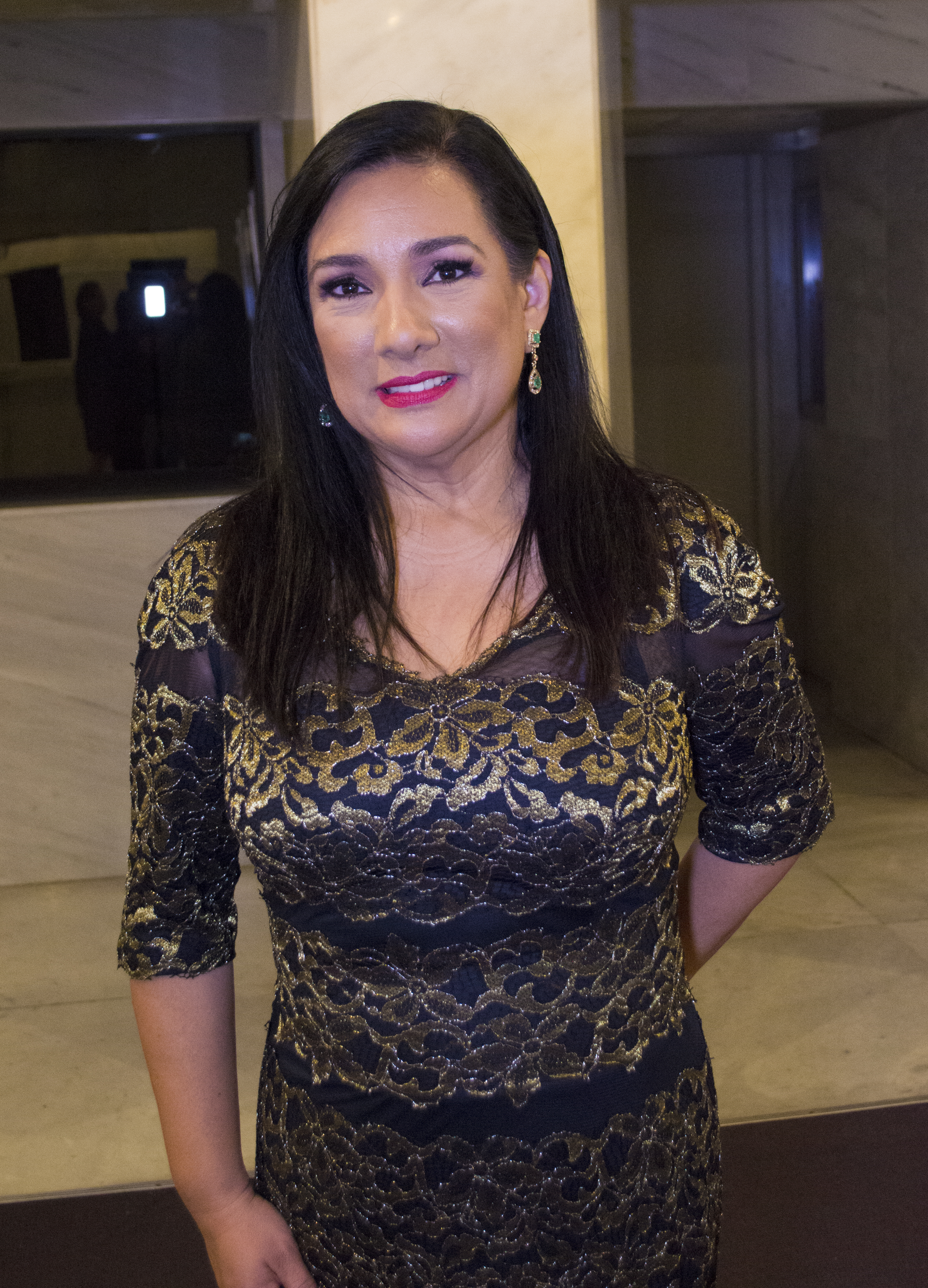
- Born: August 2, 1963; Machala, Ecuador
- Died: May 21, 2022 (aged 58); US
- Education: Universidad Laica Vicente Rocafuerte
- Occupations: Journalist, news director, television producer, presenter, social commentator

Tania Tinoco (August 2, 1963 – May 21, 2022) was an Ecuadorian journalist, author, television producer, director, TV and radio presenter, reporter, interviewer, and opinion leader. For more than 30 years she has been known as the host of the Ecuavisa nightly newscast, Televistazo.

== Biography ==
Tania Tinoco was born in Machala on August 2, 1963. At the age of 11, together with her father Colón Tinoco, she went to live in Guayaquil, where she studied at the Unidad Educativa Bilingüe de La Inmaculada.

At age 15, she was a member of the school's Journalism Club. Her first report for the school magazine was about an interview with the singer José Luis "El Puma" Rodríguez, granted after much insistence to his manager. This cemented her decision to pursue journalism as a profession.

Tinoco studied journalism at the Universidad Laica Vicente Rocafuerte.

In December 1983, at age 20, with the help of the director of her college who recommended her to the Human Resources manager of Ecuavisa, she was brought on by the channel to work in the filing.

In 1986, Nila Velásquez, then director of the Sunday newscast and current opinion editor of the newspaper El Universo, recommended to Alberto Borges that he choose Tania to read the news. Thus she became part of the evening news show Telemundo, alongside Borges.

On May 30, 1992, Tinoco married Bruce Hardeman, a Swiss businessman with whom she has two children.

In 1994 her father died, followed six months later by Alberto Borges, who had been her companion on the news for eight years.

Tania Tinoco was the director and presenter of the news program Telemundo and the investigative program Visión 360, both on Ecuavisa.

== Awards ==
On January 29, 2015, Tinoco was presented with the Eugenio Espejo National Journalism Prize by the National Union of Ecuadorian Journalists (Spanish: Unión Nacional de Periodistas del Ecuador; UNP) in the television category, for the documentary titled Los niños de Génova.
