= Martha de la Torre =

Ecuadorian-American publisher and entrepreneur

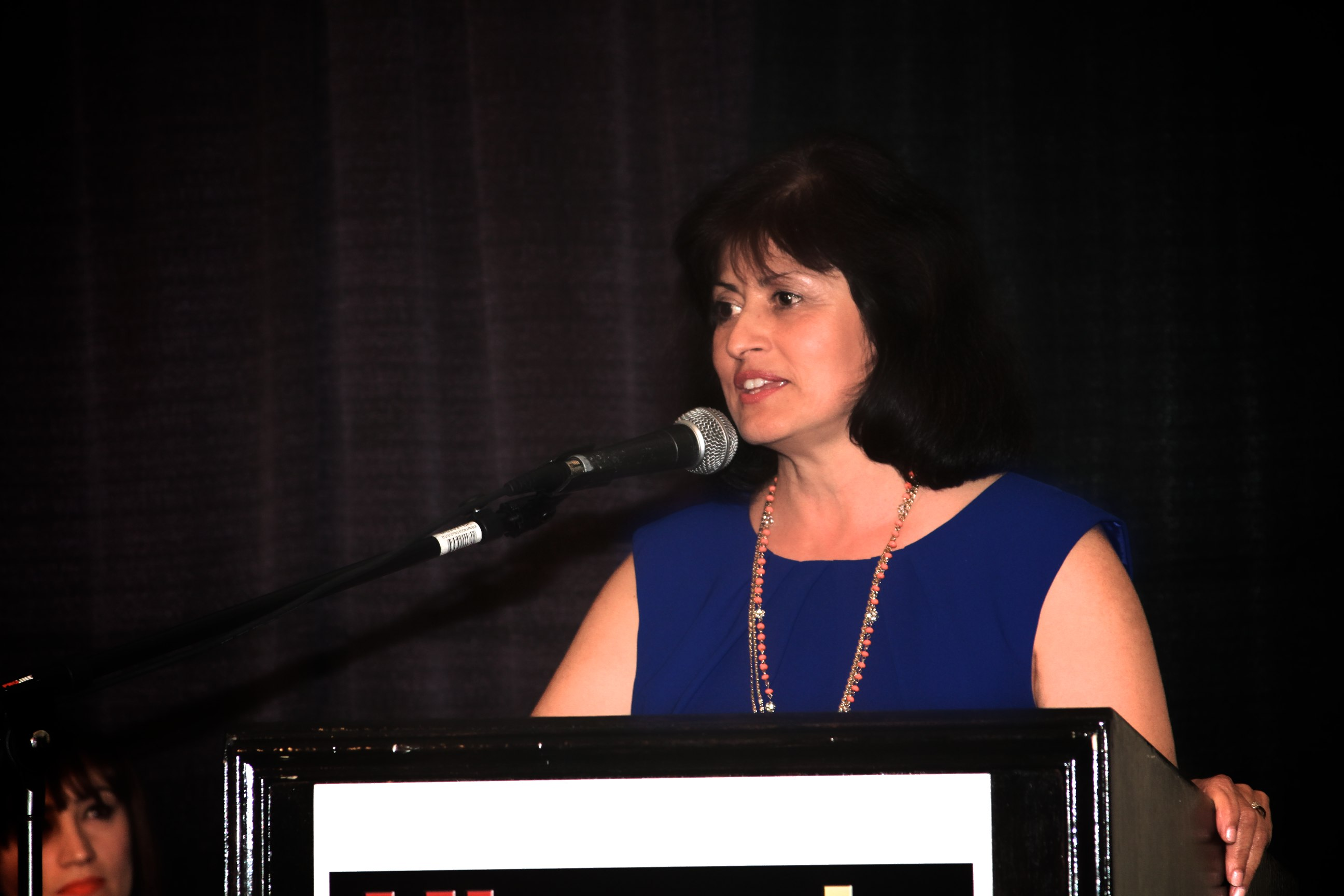
- de la Torre at the Latinas of Influence Event in 2013
- Born: July 13, 1957 (age 68); Los Angeles, California
- Occupation: Publisher/Corporate Executive
- Title: Co-Founder, President and CEO, El Clasificado; CEO, EC Hispanic Media
- Board member of: Loyola Marymount University; International Classified Media Association, Chairperson; Los Angeles Child Guidance Clinic; LMU's Latino Alumni Association
- Spouse: Joe Badame

Martha de la Torre (born July 13, 1957) is an Ecuadorian American publisher and entrepreneur, as well as the co-founder and president of El Clasificado and EC Hispanic Media. In 2000, de la Torre was named Hispanic Business Woman of the Year by the United States Hispanic Chamber of Commerce.

== Early life and education ==
De la Torre was born in Los Angeles to an Ecuadorian mother and father, Elvia and Bolivar de la Torre. They were both born in Ambato, Ecuador and immigrated to the United States in the 1950s. Elvia and Bolivar are American citizens.

De la Torre graduated from Leuzinger High School in Lawndale, California. She went on to earn a Bachelor of Science degree from Loyola Marymount University, where she studied accounting.

== Early career ==
In 1978, De la Torre joined Arthur Young & Company where she became a Certified Public Accountant and audit manager specializing in banks and businesses targeting the US Hispanic market.

In 1986, she served as Chief Financial Officer of La Opinion, the largest Spanish language daily publication in the United States.

In 1988, de la Torre founded El Clasificado. This endeavor allowed her to channel her business and journalism expertise to create a resource for the Hispanic community.

== El Clasificado ==
On May 7, 1988, de la Torre and her now-husband Joe Badame launched El Clasificado for Southern California's Hispanic population. The direct-mail publication's purpose was to connect sellers of various products and services within the Hispanic community, while also providing Latinos with educational resources and how-to lifestyle improvement articles that were not widely available in Spanish.

At first, the response was underwhelming. De la Torre and Badame responded by changing the distribution method of the publication from direct-mail circulation to a bulk drop in areas with high Hispanic traffic. El Clasificado is now the largest free, weekly Spanish print publication in the US, reaching more than 1 million weekly readers.

The success of the print publication lead to the launch of ElClasificado.com in 1998. El Clasificado's new digital format allowed the publication to reach a wider audience, and today the website boasts more than 9 million monthly page views.

As the publication expanded its reach, El Clasificado became EC Hispanic Media. The company offers marketing to its clients, as well as print, digital, social media and event advertising. Its portfolio of brands includes EC Classifieds, Quinceanera.com, Su Socio de Negocios, MasClientes and Al Borde.

Today, the company has revenues over $20 million and over 100 employees.

== Boards and appointments ==
De la Torre currently serves on the City National Bank Latino Advisory Board and the Loyola Marymount University Latino Alumni Association Board.

She is a former board member of the Los Angeles Child Guidance Clinic and the L.A. County Education Foundation. She formerly served on the Board of Regents for Loyola Marymount University.

De la Torre was appointed Chairperson of the International Classified Media Association, representing over 60 classified media organizations globally.

== Awards ==
In May 2012, she received the Latino Business Award presented by the Los Angeles Business Journal. De la Torre also received recognition from her previous employer, Ernst and Young, as an "Alumni in the News."

On April 3, 2013, Hispanic Lifestyle Magazine named de la Torre one of Hispanic Lifestyle's 2013 Latinas of Influence

In August 2014, she won the 2014 California Latina Business Woman of the Year Award.

In November 2014, the Regional Hispanic Chamber of Commerce and The Regional Hispanic Institute recognized Martha de la Torre as the "Woman of the Year." This award recognizes the leadership of women in the Hispanic community.
