= Juan Espinoza (Ecuadorian footballer) =

Ecuadorian footballer (born 1987)

Juan Espinoza Max Barrios
Personal information
- Full name: Juan Carlos Espinoza Mercado
- Date of birth: 23 July 1987 (age 39)
- Place of birth: Machala, Ecuador

Team information
- Current team: Liga de Loja

Senior career*
Years	Team	Apps	(Gls)
2004–2011	Universitaria de Loja		
2006	→ Deportivo Cuenca (loan)		
2008	→ JVC FC (loan)		
2009	→ Buffalos (loan)		
2011	Municipal Cañar		
2012–2013	Juan Aurich	12	(1)

International career
2013	Peru U20	4	(0)
- * Club domestic league appearances and goals

Juan Carlos Espinoza Mercado (born 23 July 1987, in Machala) is an Ecuadorian professional football player who has played for the Ecuadorian club Liga Deportiva Universitaria de Loja, and in 2010 he joined Peruvian club Juan Aurich.

== International career ==
=== Identity case ===
In January 2013, he was called into the 2013 South American Youth Championship for the Peruvian U20 team. He played in four games under the name of Max Barrios Prado before it was reported that he had used false documentation that implied that the player was 17 years old. The Civil Registry of Ecuador released documentation showing that the player was 25 years old and married. He was withdrawn from the competition.

The rumors were initially reported by someone who claimed to be a friend of 'Maradona', the former player of Palma de Huacho and the apparent father of 'Max Barrios'. The person claimed Maradona told him that the U20 player was from "Colombia or Ecuador" and that 'Maradona' was not the player's father.

Jaime Villavicencio, President of Universitaria de Loja club confirmed that the player in the U20 competition is the same person as the one who played for Universitaria de Loja. The Peruvian club Juan Aurich has passed information on to their lawyers as the player signed a contract with Juan Aurich using false documentation.
