= Zaruma =

- Town
- Villa Real De San Antonio del Cerro de Oro de Zaruma
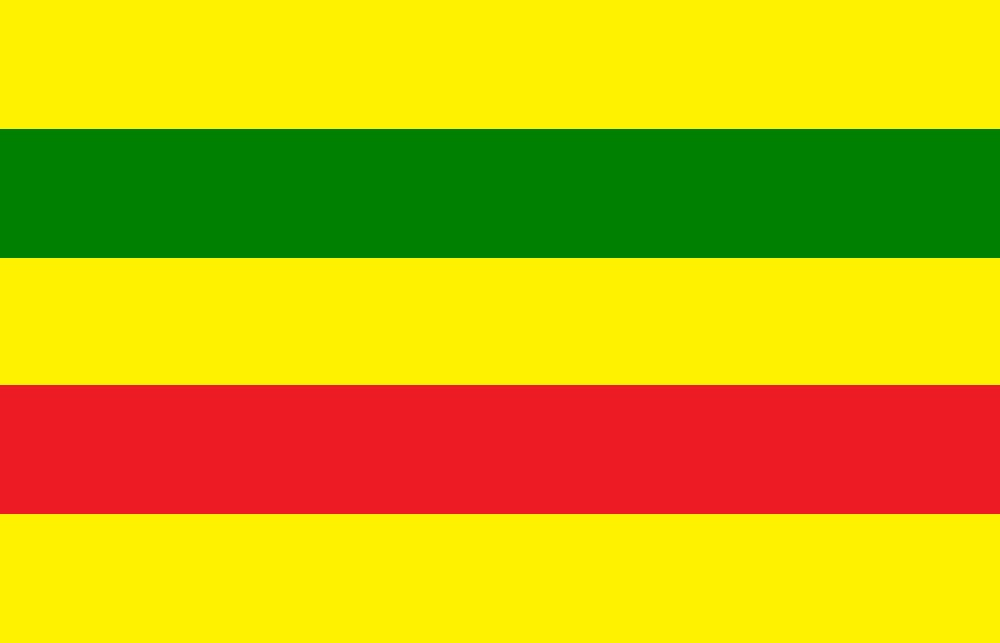
- Flag
- Nickname: Sultana de El Oro
- Location of Zaruma within Ecuador
- Coordinates: 03°41′00″S 79°36′00″W
- Country: Ecuador
- Province: El Oro Province
- Canton: Zaruma Canton
- Foundation: December 8, 1595
- Founder: Damian Meneses
- Named for: zara and huma

Government
  - Type: Mayor and council
  - Mayor: Carlos Aguilar

Area
  - Town: 2.6 km^{2} (1.0 sq mi)
- Elevation: 1,200 m (3,900 ft)

Population (2022 census)
  - Town: 10,005
  - Density: 3,800/km^{2} (10,000/sq mi)
- Demonym: Zarumeño(-a)
- Time zone: UTC-5 (ECT)
- Postal code: EC071150 (new format)
- Area codes: (0)72972, (0)72973
- Website: http://www.zaruma.gob.ec

Zaruma, officially Villa Real de San Antonio del Cerro de Oro de Zaruma is a town in the south of Ecuador, El Oro Province. It is located in the south-east of this province, at an altitude of 1200 metres above sea level, on an inter-Andes route where the Vizcaya mountain range branches off from the Chilla mountain range. It is the seat of Zaruma Canton, one of the oldest cantons in the province.

Zaruma is known for its republic-era architecture, gold mines, culture and traditions, art and coffee and for having been founded by Spanish explorer Alonso de Mercadillo. These attributes have led to its receiving various titles celebrating both its tangible and intangible aspects, and in 1998 the Ecuadorian Institute for Cultural Heritage submitted it as a candidate UNESCO World Heritage Site.

Zaruma was named a Pueblo Mágico (magical town) by the Ecuadorian Ministry of Tourism (MINTUR) in 2019. It is one of five communities across the country that inaugurated the programme that year.

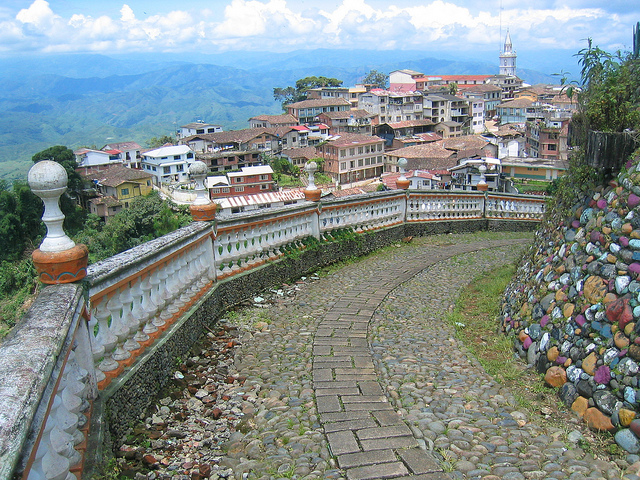
View of Zaruma

== Etymology ==
The word Zaruma is formed from two quichua words: sara, which means corn, and uma, which means head. That is to say, Zaruma to translates to "corn head", a name attributed to the existing corn and to the gold mined here, which is similar in colour to a corncob. It is not known why the spelling was altered from "Saruma" to "Zaruma". However, historian Jorge Núñez claims that Zaruma means "small mountain peak".

== History ==
=== First settlers ===
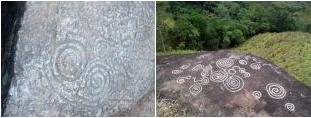
Petroglyphs

It is believed that one of the few states existing among early settlers was Zarzas, which contained eleven tribes: the Cariamangas, Catacochas, Catamayus, Gonzanamaes, Guachanamaes, Malacatos, Piscobambas, Vilcabambas, Yanganas and Zarumas.

=== Integration ===
It is believed that the Cañari settled in what is now Zaruma canton between 500 and 1400 CE. This is supported by the existence of important archeological sites such as Guayquichuma, Chepel, Payama, Trencilla, San Antonio, Chiva Turco, Tocto Shuqin, Guartiguro, among others, all of which have been attributed to the Cañari.

=== Inca invasion ===
In the 1480s, the Cañari settled in Zaruma were overpowered by the Incas who were then under the command of Huayna Capac. After ordering his subordinates to explore the north, they invaded the Zaruma basin, enslaving the indigenous Cañari for 50 years.

The Inca, now settled in Zaruma, felt compelled to contribute to the ransom of Atahualpa when he was taken prisoner by the Spanish. In 1533, their chief Quinará decided to take a lot of gold in order to pay this ransom. Records say that he crossed the river Pisco Bamba, Catamayo Canton, but on learning of Atahualpa's execution he buried the gold in deep galleries close to the Guatuchi Hacienda in Loja Province.

=== Conquest and foundation ===
In 1549, the first Spanish towns were established in this region by the Spanish caudillo Alonso de Mercadillo. Zaruma became very important because of its rich gold deposits, for which reason Philip II of Spain granted it the title of "Villa de Sant Antonio del Zerro de Oro de Zaruma" (Villa Real de San Antonio del Cerro de Oro de Zaruma on October 17, 1593.

On 8 December 1595, Captain Damián Meneses (under the orders of García Hurtado de Mendoza, Viceroy of Peru) fulfilled the royal edict and definitively founded Zaruma. This foundation had much significance for the area, including the loss of its cultural identity due to the imposition of a dominant culture, as well as the formation of rigid structures of injustice against indigenous rights.

On 20 January 1749, the city and the majority of its mines were destroyed by an earthquake. To the misfortune of the Spanish, a large indigenous rebellion erupted and resulted in a mass exodus and the ruin of the city. After this, Zaruma entered into a deep economic depression, but with the efforts of some miners and official aid from the Crown allowed the importation of native peoples to work in the mines, which allowed the improvement of the city's circumstances. Research suggests that between 1536 and 1820, Spain benefited from approximately 2,700 tonnes of Zaruman gold.

=== Independence ===
On 26 November 1820, Zaruma declared its independence from Spain. Following the examples of Quito, Guayaquil and Cuenca, a group of Zaruman patriots supported by Cuencan intellectuals declared their independence despite the fierce opposition of the government of Loja. The architects of its freedom were Fray Justo Gaona and Francisco Barnuevo, together with Ambrosio Maldonado, Bonifacio de los Reyes, Antonio Barzallo, José María Gálvez and José Gusmán y Román, citizens who signed a document at the Loja council house, now considered as its independence act.

After independence, the area fell into a state of deep depression. However, its mining industry never completely disappeared.

=== Gran Colombia and Zaruma's Gold ===
On 25 June 1824, Zaruma was raised to the level of canton according to the Colombian territorial division law, which named it as part of the province of Loja, department of Azuay. The Liberator Simón Bolivar, trying to reenergise mining production and find resources for administering the state, passed the Mining Laws in 1829 and named Sr Manuel Astudillo Samaniego as the Mining Magistrate for this canton.

=== Restarting the economy ===
The newly formed state invited technicians and businesses from throughout the world to invest in mining, especially in Zaruma. In 1862, García Moreno created a tax on mining in order to benefit Zaruma municipality. In 1876, Ignacio de Veintimilla hired the German geologist Teodoro Wolf to study Zaruma's mines. Later, in 1860, the Great Zaruma Gold Mining Company Limited was formed with the help of English investments and a total capital of £250,000.

=== El Oro Province ===
On 29 November 1882, Zaruma, Machala and Santa Rosa provinces declared the creation of a new province named El Oro, in honour of the region's gold, of which Zaruma was capital until 1884. On 23 April 1884, with the New Law of Territorial Division, the province was recognised but with its capital in Machala.

=== Crypto-Judaism ===
It has been widely reported for many years that Zaruma and its neighboring city Loja, Ecuador has been a safe-haven place for Crypto-Jews. Evidence includes customs and a Ladino dialect.

In December 2013, Israeli Ambassador Eliyahu Yerushalmi officially visited the governor of El Oro, hosting several councillors in the presence of the mayor Danilo Astudillo Mora, the main local authorities, representatives of institutions, schools and student delegations symbolically handing over the keys of the city. The mayor also announced that this would establish some points of cooperation that would affect the development of the region. Jose Reyes Aguilar, head of the University of Quevedo, also presented some views on the reality of the livestock sector and the future agreements established with Israel. The Israeli Ambassador took the floor to congratulate the authorities and its people for preserving a wonderful, pleasant and unique city, which identifies its Sephardic descent, and offered to build international relations in the areas of technology and education.

=== Other dates ===
In 1990, the Ecuadorian Ministry for Education and Culture declared Zaruma as an Ecuatorian Cultural Heritage site. Since 1998, Zaruma has been on Unesco's list of candidates for World Heritage Site. In 2022, arachnologists named a large new species of tarantula from Zaruma after the town: Pamphobeteus zaruma Sherwood et al., 2022

== Climate ==
Climate data for Zamura, elevation 1,150 m (3,770 ft), (1971–2000)
Month	Jan	Feb	Mar	Apr	May	Jun	Jul	Aug	Sep	Oct	Nov	Dec	Year
Mean daily maximum °C (°F)	27.3 (81.1)	26.3 (79.3)	26.7 (80.1)	27.1 (80.8)	27.7 (81.9)	27.3 (81.1)	28.1 (82.6)	28.9 (84.0)	29.2 (84.6)	28.6 (83.5)	29.2 (84.6)	28.2 (82.8)	27.9 (82.2)
Mean daily minimum °C (°F)	16.7 (62.1)	16.6 (61.9)	17.1 (62.8)	17.2 (63.0)	16.8 (62.2)	16.5 (61.7)	16.3 (61.3)	16.1 (61.0)	16.2 (61.2)	16.5 (61.7)	16.3 (61.3)	16.5 (61.7)	16.6 (61.8)
Average precipitation mm (inches)	199.0 (7.83)	236.0 (9.29)	297.0 (11.69)	221.0 (8.70)	100.0 (3.94)	23.0 (0.91)	5.0 (0.20)	7.0 (0.28)	22.0 (0.87)	33.0 (1.30)	29.0 (1.14)	101.0 (3.98)	1,273 (50.13)
Average relative humidity (%)	84	86	86	85	84	85	82	80	79	80	78	80	82
Source: FAO
