= Mirka Cabrera =

Ecuadorian model / pageant contender

- Born: Mirka Paola Cabrera Mazzini; September 10, 1994 (age 32); Machala, Ecuador
- Occupation: Model
- Height: 1.75 m (5 ft 9 in)
- Beauty pageant titleholder
- Title: Miss World Ecuador 2016
- Hair color: Black
- Eye color: Brown
- Major competitions: Reina de Puerto Bolívar 2009 (Winner); Reina de Machala 2014 (Winner); Reina de la Minería 2014 (Winner); Reina Mundial del Banano Ecuador (1st Runner-up); Miss Ecuador 2015 (Unplaced); Miss World Ecuador 2016 (Winner); Miss World 2016 (Top 21 Talent Competition)

Mirka Cabrera (born 10 September 1994) is an Ecuadorian model and beauty pageant titleholder who was crowned Miss Ecuador and competed at Miss World 2016.

== Pageantry ==
She was elected Reina de Puerto Bolívar 2009. In 2014, she won Reina de la Minería and Reina de Machala. Also, in the same year, she competed at Reina Mundial del Banano Ecuador where she was the 1st Runner-up. In 2015, Cabrera competed at Miss Ecuador where she was unplaced, and in 2016, she competed at Miss World Ecuador where she was elected the winner, at the end of the evening.

=== Miss World 2016 ===
As the winner of Miss World Ecuador 2016, Cabrera represented Ecuador at Miss World 2016 that was held in the United States. She was in the top 21 in talent competition, but she failed to place in the final top at the coronation event where Stephanie Del Valle won the crown.

Awards and achievements
Preceded by Camila Marañón	Miss World Ecuador; 2016	Succeeded by Romina Zeballos
