= Loreto Canton =

- Canton
- Location of Orellana Province in Ecuador.

- Loreto Canton in Orellana Province
- Coordinates: 0.6904°S 77.3083°W
- Country: Ecuador
- Province: Orellana Province
- Time zone: UTC-5 (ECT)

Loreto Canton is a canton of Ecuador, located in the Orellana Province. Its capital is the town of Loreto. Its population at the 2001 census was 13,462.

== Demographics ==
Ethnic groups as of the Ecuadorian census of 2010:

- Indigenous 67.4%
- Mestizo 27.3%
- White 2.9%
- Afro-Ecuadorian 1.5%
- Montubio 0.6%
- Other 0.2%
