= Gilberto Chamba =

Ecuadorian serial killer

- Born: Gilberto Antonio Chamba Jaramillo; 1963 (age 62–63); Machala, El Oro Province, Ecuador
- Other name: The Monster of Machala
- Conviction: Murder
- Penalty: 45 years in prison

Details
- Victims: 9
- Span of crimes: 1988–2004
- Country: Ecuador, Spain
- States: El Oro, Catalonia
- Date apprehended: Module 6, Center Penitenciari de Quatre Camins

Gilberto Antonio Chamba Jaramillo (born 1963) is an Ecuadorian serial killer, convicted of murdering nine people in Ecuador and Spain.

Known as The Monster of Machala, he was convicted of several murders in south-west Ecuador, but was released under an amnesty, and moved to Spain where he committed another murder. He was sentenced to 45 years in prison in Spain on November 5, 2006.

== Crimes ==
According to several media sources in Ecuador, Chamba talked the police through the steps he took before, during and after each murder.

He owned a taxi in which, from 1988 to 1993, he toured the streets of Machala apparently in search of customers but secretly targeting unaccompanied young female students.

The officers who captured Chamba initially doubted the extent of his confessions, and tried to expose him by taking him to places far from the actual murder sites. However, with surprising coldness, Chamba corrected them and led them back to the correct locations.

A report in the Spanish Newspaper El Mundo includes the testimony of Fausto Terán, a retired policeman who played a part in Chamba's capture:

According to what Chamba confessed, he did not penetrate his victims vaginally. He practically skewered them with an instrument similar to a cane, which he had had expressly made to order. In many cases, he forced the instrument into them with such violence that it came out through their mouths.

=== Trial in Ecuador ===
Thanks to the testimony of a sex worker, one of the two women who survived his attack, criminal proceedings could be initiated against Chamba. He was accused of murdering eight women and raping two. Among his victims were two minors. He was sentenced to 16 years in prison. However, he served only 7 of these years, as he benefited from a law which reduced the sentences of well-behaved prisoners by half, and received another year's reduction due to the Great Jubilee in 2000.

== Migration to Spain ==
On November 9, 2000, after serving his sentence and having his police record cleaned – a legal right only possible in Ecuador – Chamba, who until then was married and had daughters with his wife Mariela, decided to move to Spain. He took a flight to Amsterdam, and from there he traveled to the Barajas airport in Madrid, where two of his sisters were waiting for him.

Since then, Chamba maintained several jobs that varied between masonry and being the doorman in his own building, where he lived with his family and casual girlfriends.

In September 2004, Chamba gained employment as a parking attendant at the entertainment complex Illa de I 'Oci, located near the Law Faculty of the University of Lleida. There he served not only as a caretaker, but also assisted the workers who cleaned the movie theaters.

== María Isabel Bascuñana ==
Gilberto was arrested on December 1, 2004, accused of having raped and murdered María Isabel Bascuñana, a law student in Lleida.

The last time she was seen alive was the night of November 23. Her parents last spoke to her at approximately 10 PM, when she told them that she was not going to have dinner at home. Her body was found two days later in the trunk of her own car, which was parked a few streets away from the cinema. She had a handkerchief tied around her neck, with garbage bags wrapped around her body. She had been brutally raped.

Soon after, several theories arose about her death. Some speculated that it was a crime of passion, others revenge, but it was her friends who provided the necessary clues to catch the killer.

=== Evidence ===
Maria's friends told the investigating Mossos d'Esquadra that Chamba constantly harassed her while she was dropping off or picking up her car from the entertainment complex. That accusation was repeated by those of other girls, who indicated that Chamba regularly asked for their phone numbers with the excuse that if something happened to their cars he could call them immediately.

However, many of them received sexually harassing calls, and believed that the parking attendant made them. This hypothesis was confirmed when police officers found María's phone. After making records of the incoming and outgoing calls hours before and after the murder, they found that Maria's phone had been used to make two calls to phone sex services. The calls lasted between five and six minutes.

That was one of the clues that led the police closer to consider Chamba as the main suspect. In addition to this, officers testified to having found garbage bags inside the glove compartment of María's vehicle, the same ones that were used to cover her body. They were the same brand as the industrial-sized ones used by cleaners in the cinemas to collect waste, another possible link to Chamba, one of the cleaning assistants.

At first Chamba was detained solely for questioning, as his co-workers, who were called to testify in the trial, said that they hadn't noticed anything strange the night of the murder and that the Ecuadorian did not leave his post. In addition, there were testimonies from neighbours and acquaintances of Chamba in his favour and describing him as a kind man, called his guilt into question.

However, DNA tests on the sperm residue found on the victim's body identified it as belonging to Chamba, who argued that the police were fabricating evidence in order to charge him. He claimed that officers took a sperm sample from a condom he had used and then inserted it into María's vagina to incriminate him.

However, the resulting analyses and tests brought forward by the prosecution were decisive in dismantling Chamba's argument, and he was found guilty. He received a sentence of 45 years: 20 years for Maria's murder, another 12 for her rape, and another 13 for the attempted rape and murder of a Romanian prostitute who testified against him in court after seeing images of him on local media after his arrest.

In addition to this evidence, the prosecution alleged that Chamba had attempted to conceal information from the police. When first approached by the authorities, he allegedly disclosed his criminal record in Ecuador and an incident in Spain related to the possession of weapons. However, the trial proved that the "Monster of Machala" hid his criminal past until collaboration between the Ecuadorian and Catalan police confirmed that he was the same person sentenced in Machala for murders.

Chamba is currently held at Block 6 at the Center Penitenciari de Quatre Camins in Barcelona.

== See also ==
- List of serial killers by country
