= Nina Vaca =

American entrepreneur

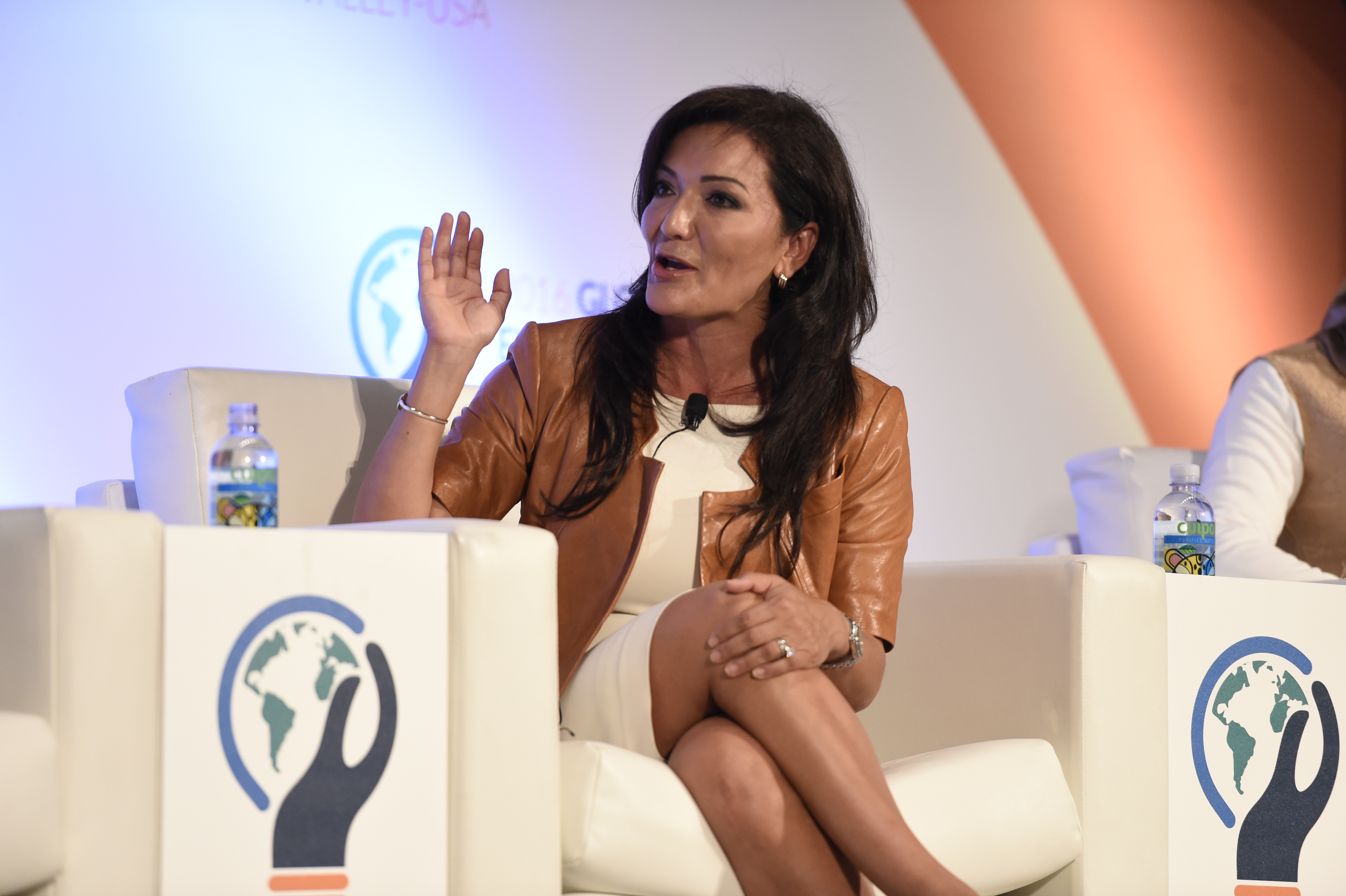
- at the Global Entrepreneurship Summit, 2016
- Born: Quito, Ecuador
- Education: Texas State University
- Occupations: Chairman & CEO Pinnacle Group
- Years active: 1996 - Present
- Board member of: Comerica Inc Kohl's Corporation Cinemark Holdings
- Spouse: Jim Humrichouse
- Children: 4

Nina Vaca is an Ecuadorian-born American entrepreneur. She is the chairperson and CEO of Pinnacle Group, a large provider of information technology and workforce solutions in US and Canada with around 5000 employees, which was named among the Fastest-Growing Women-Owned Business in the United States by the Women Presidents' Organization in 2018. The story of Nina Vaca and Pinnacle Group opens the Entrepreneur chapter of the McGraw-Hill textbook, "Understanding Business". Vaca was named one of the top 100 CEO’s in STEM publication by STEM connector.

== Early life and education ==
Vaca was born in Quito, Ecuador and is the third child of parents Amanda and Hernan Vaca' s five children. The family spent the majority of Vaca' s childhood living in Los Angeles, California where her parents owned several small businesses. The family moved to Texas in 1994 following Hernan Vaca' s death. Vaca credits her mother's example as being a major influence on herself.

Vaca began college at Texas State University shortly after relocating to Texas and graduated in 1994 with a Bachelor of Arts in speech communications and a minor in business administration. She later completed executive education programs at Harvard Business School – Corporate Governance Executive Program, Tuck School of Business, and Kellogg School of Management at Northwestern. Vaca was named a Distinguished Alumna of Texas State University in 2012, and was the youngest alumna in university history to be honored with this award. Vaca also holds honorary doctorates from Northwood University, Mount Mary University, and Berkeley College.

== Career ==
Vaca began working at a young age in her family's businesses. Following her father's death, she and her sister, Jessica, ran his travel agency. After college graduation, Vaca moved to New York City to begin work in the IT industry and then relocated to Dallas, Texas to work at Computer Development Services, Inc.

In 1996, Vaca founded Pinnacle Group. The staffing business became one of the fastest growing businesses owned by a woman with a gross revenue of around $1 billion in the 2010s.

Vaca is a director of Comerica Inc. (2008–present) and Cinemark Holdings (2014–present), and was a director at Kohl's Corporation (2010–2019),

In 2021, Vaca served as an advisor to special-purpose acquisition companies co-founded by Isabelle Freidheim that focused on increasing female leadership representation in public markets.

== Civic leadership and philanthropy ==
Barack Obama appointed Vaca as a Presidential Ambassador for Global Entrepreneurship (PAGE) in 2014, an advisory group tasked with growing American entrepreneurship. In this capacity, Vaca traveled with secretary of commerce, Penny Pritzker, to Ghana in May 2014 to promote entrepreneurship globally. Vaca served as chairman of the United States Hispanic Chamber of Commerce from 2010 to 2012. She is a part of the 2016 Class of Henry Crown Fellows.

== Personal life ==
She is a mother of four children and competes in triathlon for charity

== Appearances ==
As a PAGE Ambassador, Vaca spoke at the 2016 Global Entrepreneurship Summit. She also participated as a panelist at the Women's Business Enterprise National Council's Conference and Business Fair.
