= Zaruma Canton =

- Canton
- Location of El Oro Province in Ecuador.

- Zaruma Canton in El Oro Province
- Coordinates: 3°26′S 79°36′W
- Country: Ecuador
- Province: El Oro Province

Area
  - Total: 652.1 km^{2} (251.8 sq mi)

Population (2022 census)
  - Total: 24,374
  - Density: 37.38/km^{2} (96.81/sq mi)
- Time zone: UTC-5 (ECT)

Zaruma Canton is a canton of Ecuador, located in the El Oro Province. Its capital is the town of Zaruma. Its population at the 2001 census was 23,407.

Zaruma was named a Pueblo Mágico (magical town) by the Ecuadorian Ministry of Tourism (MINTUR) in 2019. It is one of five communities across the country that inaugurated the programme that year.

== Demographics ==
Ethnic groups as of the Ecuadorian census of 2010:

- Mestizo 83.6%
- White 7.4%
- Montubio 6.6%
- Afro-Ecuadorian 2.1%
- Indigenous 0.2%
- Other 0.2%
