= Tarqui, Guayaquil Canton =

Tarqui
- Parish
- Etymology: Battle of Tarqui
- Location in Ecuador
- Coordinates: 2.130°S 79.911°W
- Country: Ecuador
- Province: Guayas
- Canton: Guayaquil

Population (2001)
  - Total: 835,486
- Time zone: UTC-5:00 (ECT)

Tarqui is an urban parish in Guayaquil Canton, Guayas, Ecuador, named after the Battle of Tarqui. Occupying the northern half of the city, it is the largest and most populous parish in Guayaquil. Most universities are located in its territory.

Other important places include the José Joaquín de Olmedo International Airport and the Rafael Mendoza Avilés Bridge, which connects the city with Durán and major cities of the country.

== Population ==
At the 2001 census, the parish had a population of 835,486 inhabitants, 42.9% of the population in the city. Its southeastern portion belongs to the downtown.

== Recent developments ==
In 2024, there were 1,458 complaints of car thefts in Tarqui, which Expreso called "the epicenter of car thefts in Guayaquil" ("el epicentro de los robos de autos en Guayaquil").
