= Ecuadorian Americans =

Americans of Ecuadorian birth or descent

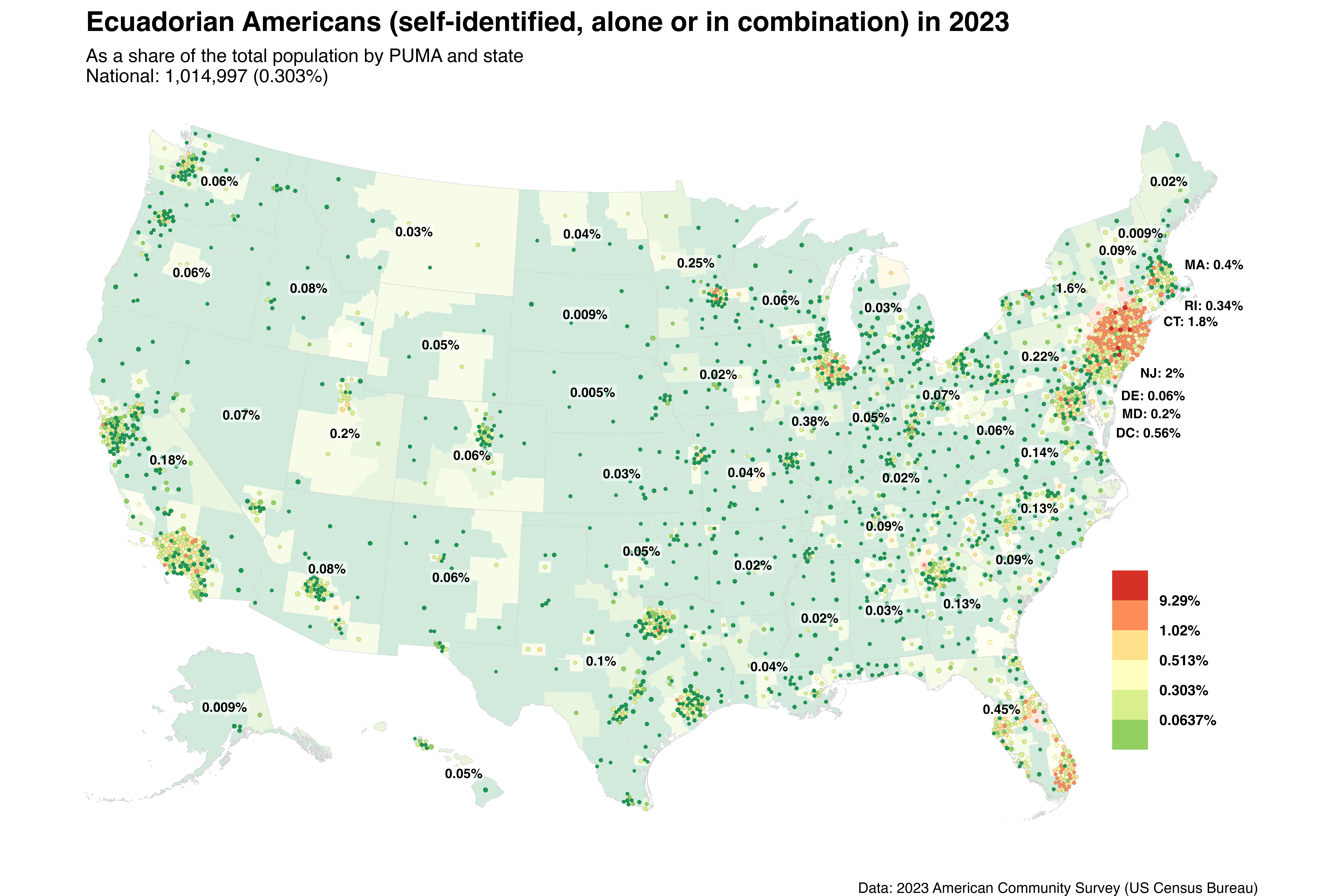

Total population
- 870,965 (2023); 0.30% of the U.S. population (2023)

Regions with significant populations
- New York, Massachusetts, Pennsylvania, New Jersey (including Northern New Jersey, Central New Jersey and Southern New Jersey), Connecticut, Rhode Island, Illinois, Wisconsin, Delaware, Maryland, Virginia, North Carolina, Georgia, Florida, Kentucky, Minnesota, Washington, Oregon, Colorado, California and Texas (including Houston and Dallas)

Languages
- American English, Ecuadorian Spanish, Spanglish

Religion
- Major: Roman Catholicism, Protestantism Minor: Judaism

Related ethnic groups
- Ecuadorians, Afro-Ecuadorians, Native Ecuadorians, Colombian Americans, Peruvian Americans, Greek Americans, British Americans, Italian Americans, Spanish Americans, Portuguese Americans, German Americans, French Americans, Lebanese Americans, Syrian Americans, Palestinian Americans, Filipino Americans, Indian Americans, Chinese Americans, Japanese Americans, Korean Americans, Native Americans

Ecuadorian Americans (Spanish: ecuatoriano-estadounidenses, norteamericanos de origen ecuatoriano or estadounidenses de origen ecuatoriano) are Americans of full or partial Ecuadorian ancestry. Ecuadorian Americans are the 10th largest Hispanic American group in the United States.

== History ==
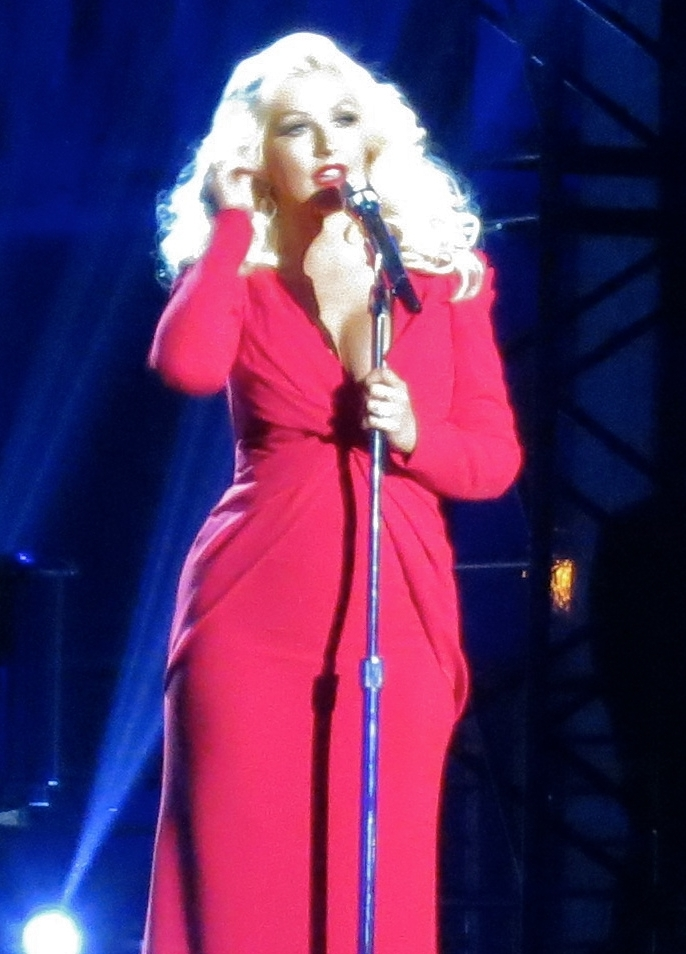
Christina Aguilera singer, songwriter, actress, and television personality.

Until the 1960s, very few Ecuadorians migrated to the United States. Between the years of 1930 to 1959, 11,025 Ecuadorians received lawful permanent resident status in the United States.

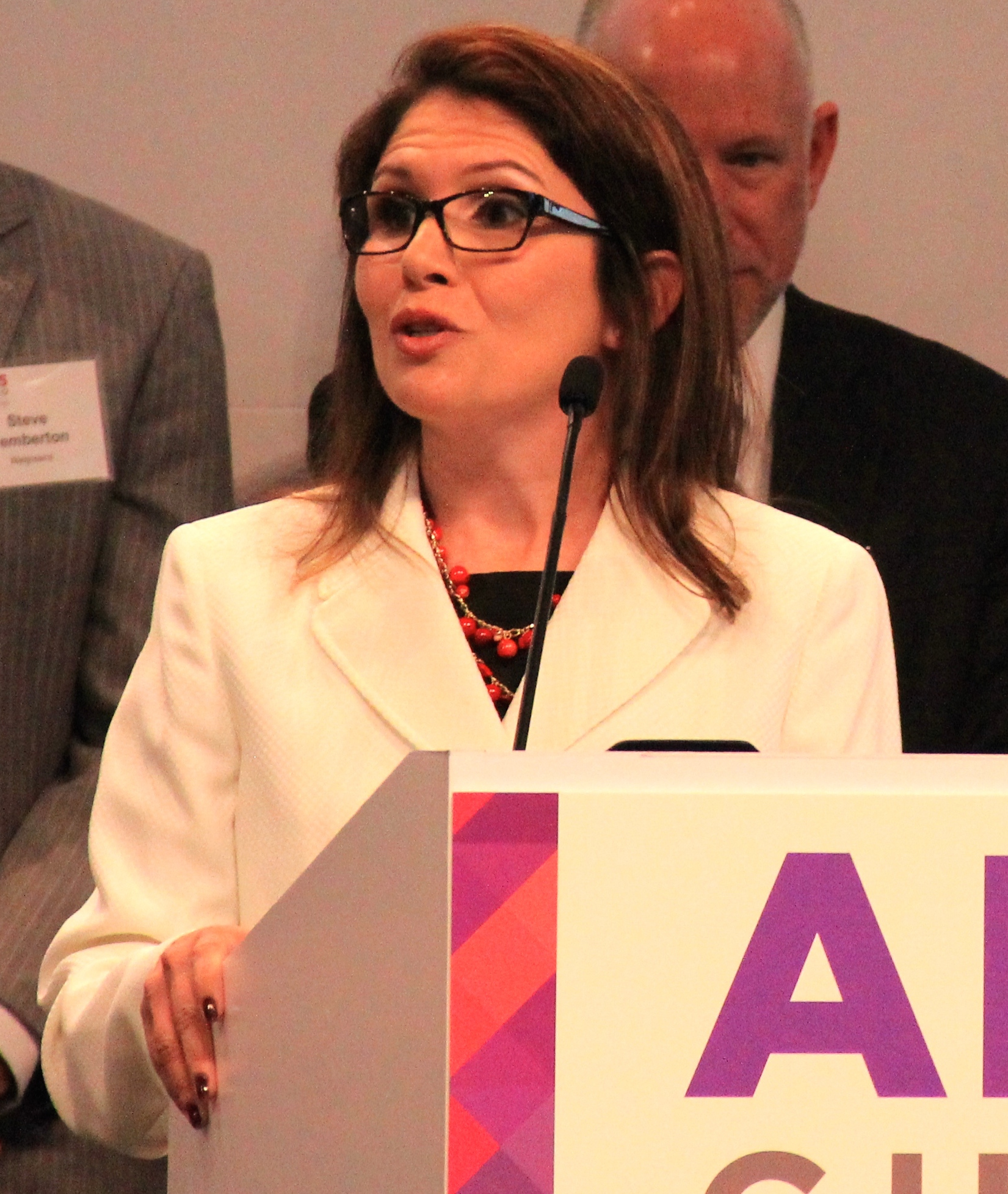
Past Illinois Lieutenant Governor Evelyn Sanguinetti

In the early 1980s, Ecuadorian emigration also saw a spike as oil prices fell due in part by the 1980s oil glut. The reduced demand for oil following the 1970s energy crisis caused for a surplus of crude oil. This resulted in Ecuador suffering an economic recession, as oil accounted for the country's largest and main source of revenue. Another cause of Ecuadorian emigration was the El Niño event during 1982–1983. Other resources existing within Ecuador were severely damaged due to the extreme climate conditions caused by El Niño, which included floods, landslides, and torrential rains. Their fishing industry, another source of revenue, especially suffered due to a failed anchovy harvest and sardines unexpectedly moving south toward Chilean waters.

The passage of the Immigration Reform and Control Act of 1986 also was a factor in Ecuadorian emigration. It provided legal status to undocumented immigrants who arrived prior to 1982. This provided nearly 17,000 Ecuadorian immigrants with legal residency status, which allowed for them to reside in the United States permanently. This became a major source of family-sponsored Ecuadorian migration to the country. Emigration again peaked in the political turmoil of 1996–97 and the national banking crisis of 1998–99. This turmoil placed seventy percent of Ecuadorians below the poverty line by 1997.

Most immigrants who live in the United States send money home. Many immigrants get U.S. citizenship, others simply are legalized, while other groups live illegally, crossing the border from Mexico or entering by boat from Puerto Rico. Ecuadorian Americans come from every part of Ecuador. During the 1970s, most of the Ecuadorians came from the northern and central highlands, including the area around Quito.

In the 1980s, many Ecuadorians came from the coast. In the 1990s, most of them came from the southern highlands, near the border with Peru. The majority of Ecuadorian immigrants emigrate into New York City and its surrounding suburbs. The 1990 census recorded that 60 percent of Ecuadorians living in the United States live in the New York City Metropolitan Area; while another 10% live in Miami.

== Ecuadorian Return Migration ==
In 2008, the Great World Recession made for a decline in Ecuadorian emigration. This event also hindered two of Ecuador's major cash flows: remittances and exports. To aid in the country's recovery, the then Ecuadorian President Rafael Correa implemented the Welcome Home Plan. The plan attempted to fight unemployment and served to boost the economy by encouraging migrants to come home through various ways, including aiding returnees in their own business ventures.

== Panama Hat Industry's role in Ecuadorian Emigration ==
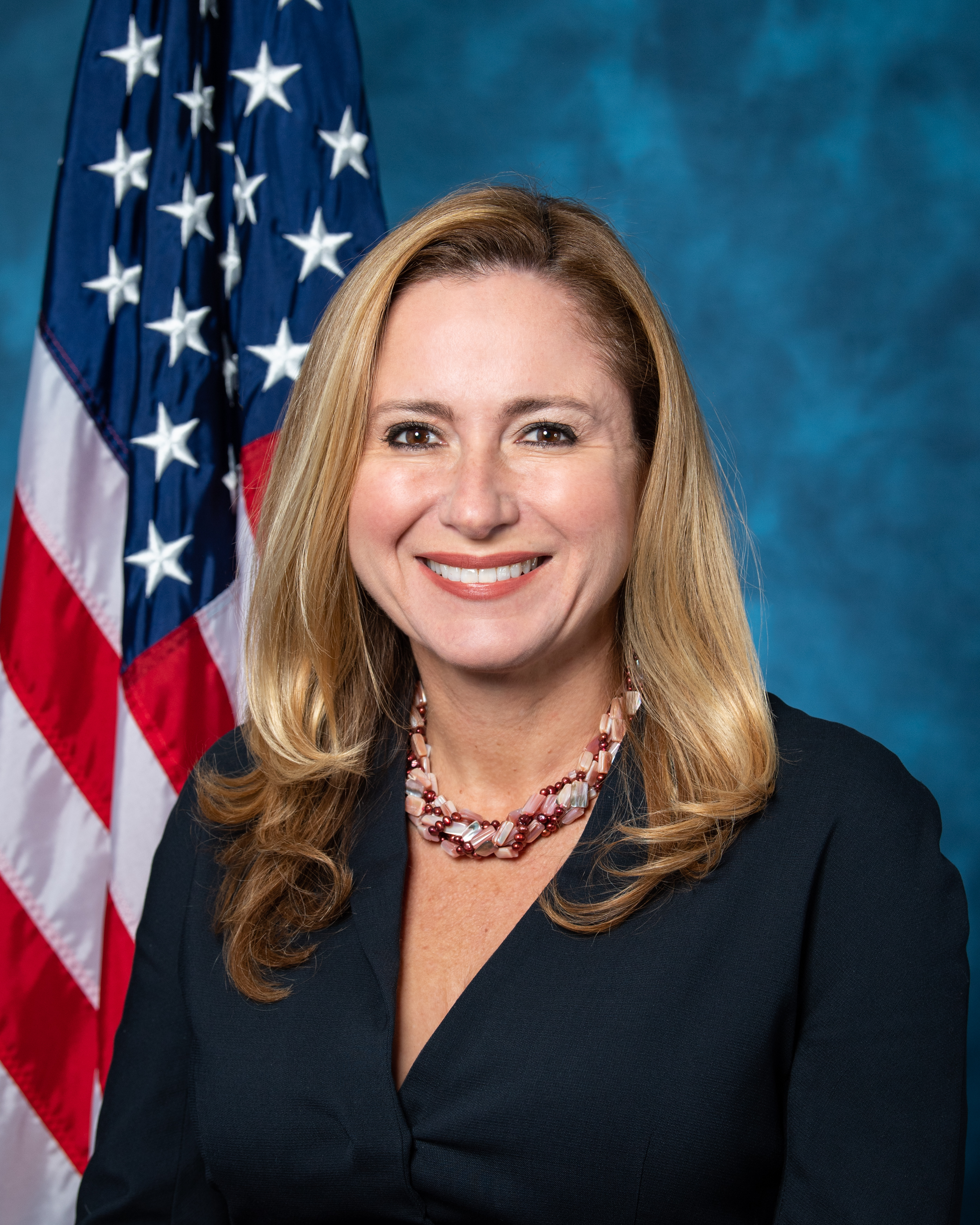
Debbie Mucarsel-Powell first South American immigrant member of Congress elected in 2018.

Ecuadorians had been sewing straw hats ever since the 16th century with the introduction of the Spanish Elites, it was not until 1835 when Manuel Alfaro would start an exportation business that would increase Ecuador's GDP. The success of selling and trading goods relies heavily on a country's location and at the time Ecuador was not a busy stop for travelers. Business people realized that a few miles north, a very busy stop for travelers seeking to go west during the California Gold rush; Panama. One of the only ways to go west from the east coast or Canada quickly and safely was to travel by sea to Panama, cross the Isthmus and continue the journey by sea.

Panama became the location where manufacturers from Ecuador, specially in the region of Cuenca would export their hats, making Cuenca a Hat industry. A fond importer and buyer of these Hat was the United States, specifically New York. Usually women were in charge of weaving the hats and men were in charge of the business side. Although the hats were very beautifully hand crafted and took months of manufacture, imitations at a cheaper price joined the competition and fashion trends started to change, decreasing the demand for them, thus leading to the decline of the Panama Hat Trade in 1950s, and 1960s. This heavily affected the working class that actually weaved the hats and the elites whom ran the exportation sites. Laborers had to migrate out of their isolated region in hopes to find job opportunities. A wave of Ecuadorians emigrated to New York City through the same connections established during the Hat trade, they were known as "pioneer migrants".

Migration to New York was very regionally focused in Ecuador, due to the Ecuadorians high economic reliance on the revenue that the exportation industry created, which was only in Cuenca and Azuay. Ecuador was so involved in this type of economic system because of the impact of pre and post Spanish colonial rule, and thus instead of exporting hats they started to export their own people. When the pioneer migrants reached NYC their families and friends joined as well, leading to a mass out migration in duding the 1980s, and 1990s after the 1980 economic crisis that left a majority of Ecuadorians, even those living in the urban areas unemployed.

The exportation of people was facilitated by the only way that Ecuadorians knew, with the help of intermediary guides, who would provide financial needs, foraged papers, and other necessary services in their host countries. These intermediaries, known as "tramitadores," would profit through high interest rates imposed on prices for the journey to the states typically ranging from $6–10,000 with 10-15% interest, and Ecuador as a whole benefited from remittances sent back. So far in 2019, 780 million of Ecuador's GDP is accounted through remittances which is the second highest source of revenue. Ecuador's regional migration industry is much like the Panama Hat industry in the sense that only a few members run the operation, where the tramitadores were members of one family in an Azyuan town and money lenders as well

In 2000, 400,000 Ecuadorians joined the other one million already residing in the United States. Today stricter immigration policies are in effect forcing Ecuadorians that are already here to stay permanently. This transnational migration of Cuenca and New York City continues today. Ecuadorians are the third largest Latin American group in the New York City and New Jersey Area. Of all the Ecuadorians the migrate to the U.S., 62 percent of them reside in NYC as of 2005 research.

== Land Reform Act of 1964 ==
In 1964 Ecuador passed the Land Reform, Idle Lands, and Settlement Act. The law was an attempt to end the feudal system that had existed in the Sierra for centuries. It redistributed land from absentee landlords to the peasants who farmed it. The law set the minimum amount of land to be granted in the redistribution at 4.8 hectares. However, the land redistributed to the peasant farmers was of terrible quality. It was mountainous, unfertile land and often just barely larger than the minimum required amount of land. The large farm owners kept the fertile valley land for themselves. The peasant farmers who received these small plots of land, called minifundios, received little to no government assistance. In spite of these difficulties, however, by 1984 over 700,000 hectares had been distributed to 79,000 peasants. Distribution of the land remained highly unequal. In 1982, 80 percent of the farms consisted of less than ten hectares; yet these small farms accounted for only 15 percent of the farmland.

== Community Involvement and Celebrations ==
Ecuadorian Americans plan an Ecuadorian parade in New York and nationwide every year that pays tribute to Ecuador independence from Spain. The Ecuadorian parade consists of singers, DJ's, cars, and dance performances by the local community. Ecuadorian Americans have also been able to develop an Ecuadorian American cultural center that was founded by 3 Ecuadorians in April 2009. Those 3 Ecuadorians are Jose Rivera, Justo Santos, and Esau Chauca. Jose Rivera formed the Children Dance Program at the Ecuadorian American Cultural Center as previously he directed a dance group. The Children Dance Program was able to get a grant of 10,000 dollars from the Vilceck Foundation in order to expand more. The Ecuadorian American Cultural Center is also known as the Ayazamana Cultural Center.

== Families from Cañar to America ==
Many families migrate from el Canton Cañar, Ecuador, in escape of struggles with poverty, land shortages, and discrimination push indigenous families to seek better lives abroad. Many come from rural areas where land has been divided into plots too small to support families, and opportunities are scarce. These challenges, along with a history of unfair treatment by the government and local groups, have fueled migration for decades. In recent years, more women have started migrating, often to reunite with their families and ensure financial support through money. Despite the dangers of crossing borders and unstable jobs in the U.S., migration from Cañar remains strong, unlike other parts of Ecuador where it has slowed. Families stay closely connected across distances, communicating often and supporting each other with gifts and money. For these communities, migration isn't just about leaving, it's a way to survive and build a future together.

=== Work Challenges for Migrant Men ===
Men from Cañar, Ecuador, face tough work conditions in the U.S. Early migrants, before 1990, found steady jobs in restaurants and often gained legal status, allowing family reunification. Newer migrants, after 2001, deal with unstable, seasonal work like roofing and gardening in suburban areas. Jobs depend on weather, and legal issues, like not having driver's licenses, make it harder to find steady work. Many work long hours in summer to save for winter, pressured by debts and the need to send money home. Despite the hardships, they often stay in the U.S. to avoid returning home empty-handed.

== Demographics ==
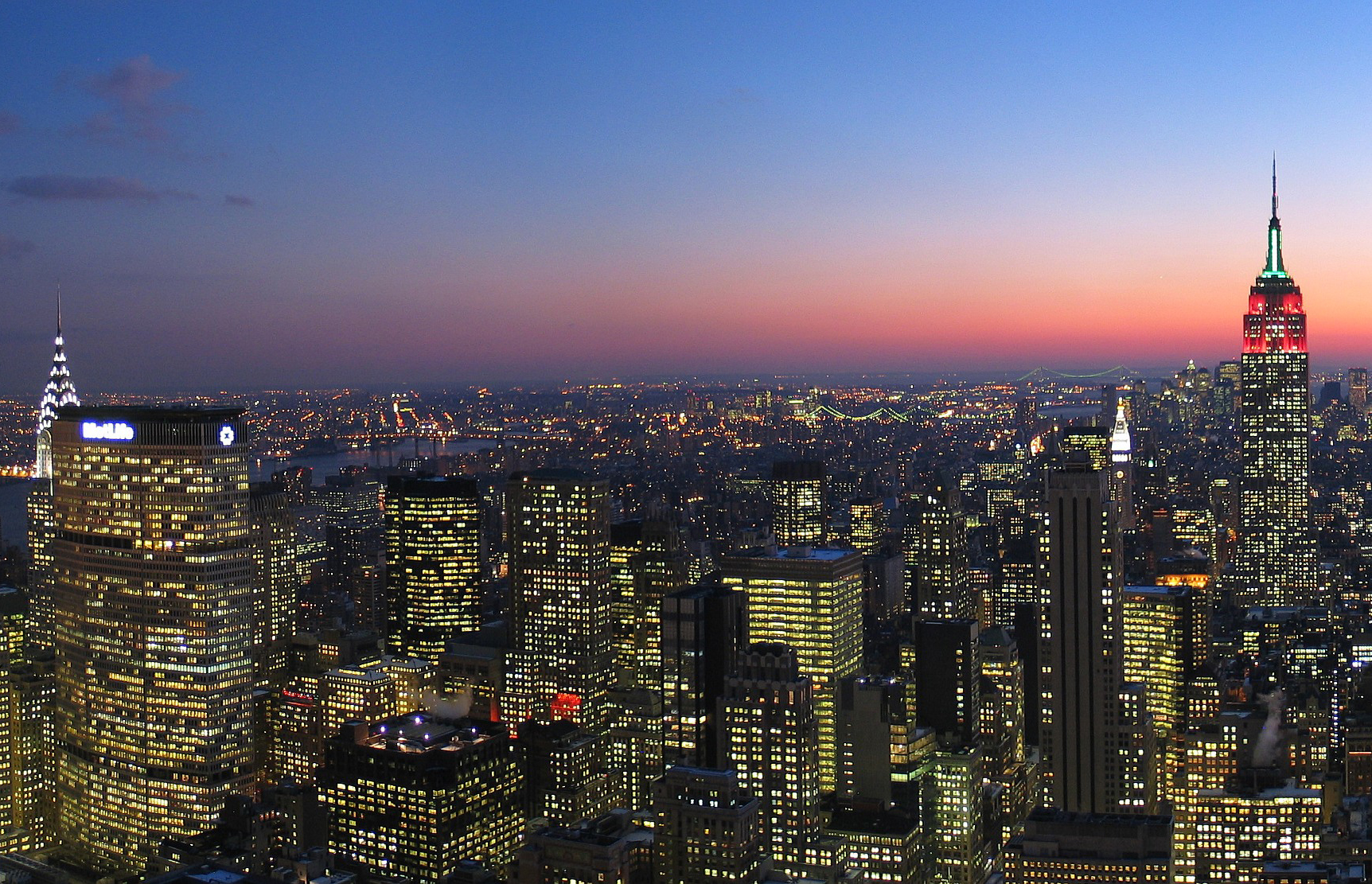
The New York City Metropolitan Area is home to the largest Ecuadorian population in the United States, by a significant margin.

Many Ecuadorians in the United States have settled in cities such as New York City (most residing in various areas of Queens, as well as in Bushwick and Fordham); Ossining, New York; Hudson, New York; Washington Heights; Danbury, Connecticut; Jersey City, New Jersey; Union City, New Jersey; Newark, New Jersey; Plainfield, New Jersey; Philadelphia, Pennsylvania; Chicago, Illinois; Orlando, Florida; Tampa, Florida; Fort Lauderdale, Florida; Miami, Florida; Houston, Texas; Dallas, Texas; San Antonio, Texas; Minneapolis, Minnesota; San Francisco, California; Los Angeles, California; and Cleveland, Ohio.

Queens County's percentage of Ecuadorians is about 4.7%, and it has the largest Ecuadorian community of any county in New York and in the United States, numbering just about 101,000 in 2010. Ecuadorians are the 2nd largest South American Hispanic group in New York City as well as in the State of New York.

Ecuadorians are the fifth largest Hispanic group in New York after Puerto Ricans, Dominicans, Colombians, and Mexicans. Ecuadorians also constitute Queens County's 2nd largest Hispanic group. Another New York group of Ecuadorians live in the Bronx, in the Morris Heights and Highbridge neighborhoods north of Yankee Stadium. Still other Ecuadorian neighborhoods are situated in Brooklyn such as Dyker Heights, Sunset Park, Bensonhurst, Williamsburg, Flatbush, Kensington, Midwood, Park Slope, Crown Heights, Brownsville, Flatlands, Canarsie, Gravesend, Prospect Heights, Red Hook, Clinton Hill, Fort Greene, Bay Ridge, Windsor Terrace, Sheepshead Bay and Brighton Beach; in New Jersey cities such as Newark and Jersey City; and in towns in Connecticut.

=== States with highest Ecuadorian population ===
The 10 states with the largest Ecuadorian population were (Source: Census 2020):

1. New York - 421,865 (2.1% of state population)
2. New Jersey - 237,523 (2.6% of state population)
3. Florida - 104,927 (0.5% of state population)
4. Connecticut - 63,677 (1.7% of state population)
5. California - 58,662 (0.15% of state population)
6. Illinois - 36,879 (0.2% of state population)
7. Texas - 31,127 (0.1% of state population)
8. Pennsylvania - 28,596 (0.1% of state population)
9. Massachusetts - 24,677 (0.3% of state population)
10. Minnesota - 15,589 (0.3% of state population)

The U.S. state with the smallest Ecuadorian population (as of 2010) was North Dakota with 55 Ecuadorians (less than 0.1% of state population).

=== U.S. Metro areas with largest Ecuadorian population ===
The largest Ecuadorian populations are found within these areas (Source: Census 2020)

1. New York-Northern New Jersey-Long Island, NY-NJ-PA MSA - 656,912
2. Miami-Fort Lauderdale-Pompano Beach, FL MSA - 67,695
3. Los Angeles-Long Beach-Santa Ana, CA MSA - 40,986
4. Bridgeport-Stamford-Norwalk, CT MSA - 40,335
5. Chicago-Joliet-Naperville, IL-IN-WI MSA - 32,045
6. Washington-Arlington-Alexandria, DC-VA-MD-WV MSA - 17,121
7. Orlando-Kissimmee-Sanford, FL MSA - 15,293
8. Minneapolis-St. Paul-Bloomington, MN-WI MSA - 7,121
9. New Haven-Milford, CT MSA - 6,680
10. Philadelphia-Camden-Wilmington, PA-NJ-DE-MD MSA - 6,440
11. Tampa-St. Petersburg-Clearwater, FL MSA - 5,292
12. Houston-Sugar Land-Baytown, TX MSA - 5,011
13. Riverside-San Bernardino-Ontario, CA MSA - 4,662
14. Charlotte-Gastonia-Rock Hill, NC-SC MSA - 4,590
15. Boston-Cambridge-Quincy, MA-NH MSA - 4,287
16. Trenton-Princeton, NJ MSA - 4,264
17. Atlanta-Sandy Springs-Marietta, GA MSA - 3,944
18. Dallas-Fort Worth-Arlington, TX MSA - 3,004
19. Poughkeepsie-Newburgh-Middletown, NY MSA - 2,957
20. Allentown-Bethlehem-Easton, PA-NJ MSA - 2,700

U.S. counties with largest Ecuadorian immigrant population

The total nationally is 438,500. All figures are taken from the 2015 - 2019 American Community Survey per the Migration Policy Institute website.

1) Queens County (Queens), NY -------------71,300

2) Essex County, NJ ---------------------------- 21,800

3) Hudson County, NJ --------------------------- 20,600

4) Kings County (Brooklyn), NY ---------------19,000

5) Bronx County (The Bronx), NY ------------ 17,500

6) Westchester County, NY -------------------- 17,000

7) Cook County, IL ------------------------------- 15,900

8) Miami-Dade County, FL --------------------- 15,700

9) Suffolk County, NY ---------------------------- 14,200

10) Fairfield County, CT ------------------------- 11,500

11) New York County (Manhattan), NY ------ 11,400

12) Los Angeles County, CA ------------------- 11,400

13) Broward County, FL ------------------------- 10,800

14) Bergen County, NJ ---------------------------- 9,800

15) Union County, NJ ------------------------------ 9,700

16) Nassau County, NY --------------------------- 7,600

17) New Haven County, CT ---------------------- 5,300

18) Orange County, FL ---------------------------- 4,700

19) Hennepin County, MN ------------------------ 4,500

20) Palm Beach County, FL ---------------------- 4,200

21) Rockland County, NY ------------------------- 4,100

22) Middlesex County, NJ ------------------------ 3,600

23) Montgomery County, MD -------------------- 3,000

24) Passaic County, NJ --------------------------- 2,900

25) Mecklenburg County, NC -------------------- 2,900

26) Harris County, TX ------------------------------ 2,800

27) Mercer County, NJ ----------------------------- 2,700

28) Morris County, NJ ------------------------------ 2,600

=== U.S. communities with high percentages of people of Ecuadorian ancestry ===
The top 25 U.S. communities with the highest percentage of people claiming Ecuadorian ancestry (as of the 2000 census, 2010 numbers in parentheses) are:

1. Sleepy Hollow, New York 10.76% (17.54%)
2. Montauk, New York 8.08% (4.21%)
3. East Newark, New Jersey 7.87% (19.87%)
4. Ossining, New York 7.48% (19.31%)
5. Patchogue, New York 7.09%
6. Hightstown, New Jersey 6.31% (14.11%)
7. Union City, New Jersey 5.94% (9.23%)
8. North Plainfield, New Jersey 5.39%
9. Town of Ossining, New York 4.98% (19.31%)
10. Port Chester, New York 4.90% (9.58%)
11. Hackensack, New Jersey 4.78% (9.98%)
12. Springs, New York 4.46% (17.25%)
13. West New York, New Jersey 4.45%
14. Peekskill, New York 4.32%
15. North Bergen, New Jersey 4.02%
16. Harrison, New Jersey 3.90%
17. Guttenberg, New Jersey 3.88%
18. East Hampton, New York 3.81%
19. East Windsor, New Jersey 3.39%
20. Dover, New Jersey 3.37%
21. Rye, New York 3.18%
22. Belleville, New Jersey 3.06%
23. Danbury, Connecticut 2.92% (7.57%)
24. Guttenberg, New Jersey 2.9%
25. Weehawken, New Jersey 2.83%

=== U.S. communities with the most residents born in Ecuador ===
The top 25 U.S. communities with the most residents born in Ecuador are:

1. Sleepy Hollow, New York 10.4%
2. East Newark, New Jersey 10.3%
3. Ossining, New York 10.1%
4. Hightstown, New Jersey 9.5%
5. North Plainfield, New Jersey 7.8%
6. Montauk, New York 7.8%
7. Patchogue, New York 7.7%
8. Union City, New Jersey 7.5%
9. Wainscott, New York 6.4%
10. Peekskill, New York 5.9%
11. Springs, New York 5.4%
12. Hackensack, New Jersey 5.3%
13. West New York, New Jersey 5.2%
14. Port Chester, New York 4.8%
15. Queens, New York 4.7%
16. Dover, New Jersey 4.6%
17. Harrison, New Jersey 4.1%
18. Twin Rivers, New Jersey 4.0%
19. Belleville, New Jersey 3.8%
20. Danbury, Connecticut 3.7%
21. Newark, New Jersey 3.6%
22. Spring Valley, New York 3.5%
23. Tarrytown, New York 3.4%
24. Brewster, New York 3.1%
25. Guttenberg, New Jersey 2.9%

== Notable people ==
- Christina Aguilera – American singer-songwriter, actress, and television personality who is of Ecuadorian descent through her father
- Cecilia Alvear – Latina journalist in television news and the former President of the National Association of Hispanic Journalists
- Dagmara Avelar – Illinois state representative
- Adrienne Bailon – American actress, singer-songwriter, dancer, and television personality, born to an Ecuadorian father and a Puerto Rican mother
- Lourdes Baird – former United States federal judge
- Nancy Bermeo – professor of political science who is the daughter of an Irish and Danish mother and an Ecuadorian father, Nuffield Chair of Comparative Politics at Oxford University
- Chico Borja – retired U.S.-Ecuadorian soccer player and current soccer coach
- Samantha Boscarino – American actress (How to Rock), Ecuadorian descent from her mother
- Leonardo Campana – Ecuadorian professional footballer
- Charles Castronovo – American tenor
- F. Javier Cevallos – president of Framingham State University in Framingham, Massachusetts
- Violet Chachki – American drag queen, singer and actress born in Atlanta, Georgia
- Cree Cicchino – American actress from Game Shakers who has descendance from Italy and Ecuador
- Carla Esparza – professional MMA artist, partial Ecuadorian heritage
- Irina Falconi – professional American tennis player
- Raul Fernandez – son of a Cuban father and an Ecuadorian mother
- April Flores – American actress and plus-size model
- David Fraser-Hidalgo – Maryland state delegate
- Alexandra von Fürstenberg – director and businesswoman
- Jose Garces – chef and restaurant owner
- Pia Getty – independent filmmaker
- Cork Graham – writer
- George Gustines – journalist
- Vinnie Hinostroza – NHL player
- Jaime Jarrín – Spanish language voice of the Los Angeles Dodgers
- Mike Judge – American actor, animator, writer, producer, director, musician, and creator of King of the Hill and Beavis and Butthead who was born in Ecuador to parents working there
- Helado Negro – South Florida native, born to Ecuadorian immigrants and based in Brooklyn New York
- Linda Machuca – migrant and politician; represented migrants in Ecuador's national assembly.
- Xolo Maridueña – Cobra Kai actor, of Ecuadorian descent
- Gerardo Mejía – Latin rapper and singer
- Nadia Mejía – Miss California USA in 2016
- Marie-Chantal, Crown Princess of Greece
- Lloyd Monserratt – (1966–2003)
- Gabriela Mosquera – former New Jersey General Assembly member
- Francisco Moya – New York City Council member; former New York Assembly member, from Corona, Queens
- Debbie Mucarsel-Powell – Congresswoman, first Ecuadorian American elected to the U.S. House of Representatives. 2024 Democratic candidate for Senator from Florida.
- John Paulson – American hedge fund manager
- Lady Pink – graffiti artist
- Fátima Ptacek – American child actress and model
- Ernesto Quiñonez – American novelist
- Evelyn Sanguinetti – 47th Lieutenant Governor of Illinois, former member of the Wheaton, Illinois City Council
- Diego Serrano – American actor
- Nelson Serrano – former Ecuadorian businessman and a nationalized American citizen (since 1971) who was convicted for murder
- Hugo Savinovich – former Ecuadorian professional wrestler
- Pancho Segura – former leading tennis player
- Byron Sigcho-Lopez – Chicago City Councilor
- Jason and Kristopher Simmons – American actors
- Martha de la Torre – entrepreneur, CEO of El Classificado
- Nina G. Vaca – chairman and CEO of PinnacleGroup
- Jose F. Valencia – President, ASA College, New York and Florida
- Carmen Velasquez – New York Supreme Court Justice, first to be elected in New York State Civil Court (2009–2014) and Supreme Court (2015–2028)
- Roberto de Villacis – American Hispanic fashion designer and artist
- Emanuel Xavier – American poet, spoken word artist, novelist, editor, and activist

== See also ==
- Corona
- Jackson Heights
- Ecuador–United States relations
