= Joya de los Sachas Canton =

Joya de los Sachas
- Canton
- Location of Orellana Province in Ecuador.

- La Joya de los Sachas Canton in Orellana Province
- Coordinates: 0.30°S 76.85°W
- Country: Ecuador
- Province: Orellana Province
- Time zone: UTC-5 (ECT)

Joya de los Sachas is a canton of Ecuador, located in the Orellana Province. Its capital is the town of La Joya de los Sachas. Its population at the 2001 census was 26,363.

== Demographics ==
Ethnic groups as of the Ecuadorian census of 2010:

- Mestizo 75.4%
- Indigenous 15.7%
- White 4.3%
- Afro-Ecuadorian 3.7%
- Montubio 0.8%
- Other 0.2%
