= Machala Canton =

- Canton
- Location of El Oro Province in Ecuador.

- Machala Canton in El Oro Province
- Coordinates: 3°16′S 79°58′W
- Country: Ecuador
- Province: El Oro Province
- Capital: Machala

Area
  - Total: 372.6 km^{2} (143.9 sq mi)

Population (2022 census)
  - Total: 306,309
  - Density: 822.1/km^{2} (2,129/sq mi)
- Time zone: UTC-5 (ECT)

Machala Canton is a canton of Ecuador, located in the El Oro Province. Its capital is the town of Machala. Its population at the 2001 census was 217,696.

== Demographics ==
Ethnic groups as of the Ecuadorian census of 2010:

- Mestizo 78.6%
- Afro-Ecuadorian 9.3%
- White 9.2%
- Montubio 1.5%
- Indigenous 1.1%
- Other 0.4%
