= Nadia Mejía =

Ecuadorian model and beauty pageant titleholder (born 1995)

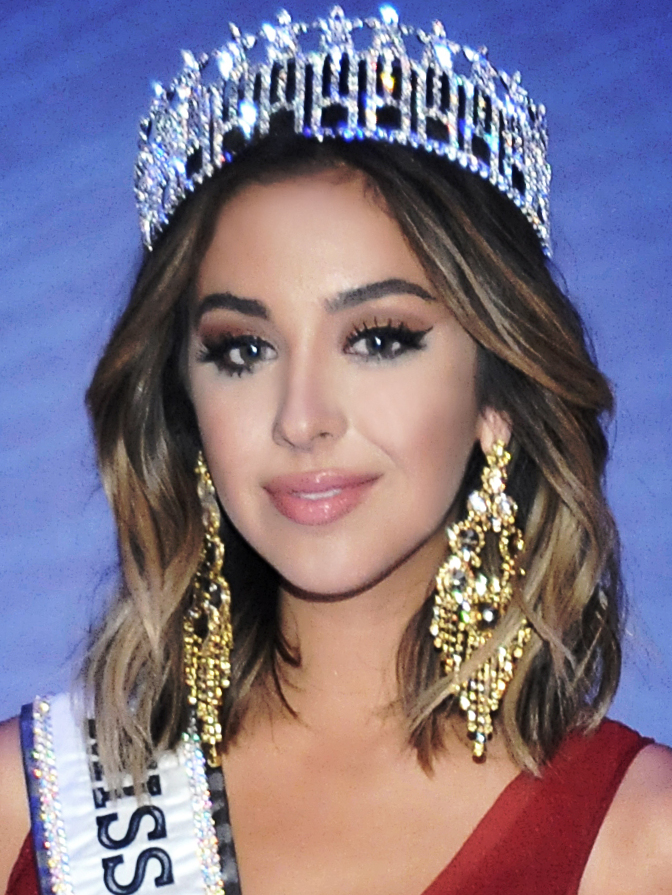
- Born: Nadia Grace Eicher Mejía; November 22, 1995 (age 30); Diamond Bar, California, U.S.
- Occupations: Model; beauty pageant titleholder
- Height: 1.80 m (5 ft 11 in)
- Spouse: Sam Webb (m. 2023)
- Beauty pageant titleholder
- Title: Miss Beverly Hills Teen USA 2013; Miss Malibu USA 2015; Miss California USA 2016; Miss Universe Ecuador 2025
- Hair color: Brown
- Eye color: Green
- Major competitions: Miss USA 2016; (Top 5); Miss Universe Ecuador 2024; (1st Runner-Up); Miss Universe Ecuador 2025; (Winner); Miss Universe 2025; (Unplaced)

Nadia Grace Eicher Mejía-Webb (born November 22, 1995) is an American-Ecuadorian model and beauty pageant titleholder who was crowned Miss Universe Ecuador 2025. She represented Ecuador at the Miss Universe 2025 pageant.

She previously won Miss California USA 2016 and placed in the Top 5 at Miss USA 2016. She also competed at Miss Universe Ecuador 2024, where she was first runner-up.

== Early life and education ==
Nadia Grace Eicher Mejía was born on November 22, 1995 in Diamond Bar, California, United States. She is the daughter of Ecuadorian-born American musician Gerardo, best known for the 1991 hit "Rico Suave", and Kathy Eicher, Miss West Virginia USA 1989. The family appeared on the reality television series Suave Says. She graduated from Diamond Bar High School in 2013.

== Pageantry ==
=== Early career ===
Mejía began her pageant career as Miss Beverly Hills Teen USA 2013. She competed twice for Miss California Teen USA, placing fourth runner-up in 2013 and reaching the Top 20 in 2014. She later held the title of Miss Malibu USA 2015 and made the Top 20 at Miss California USA 2015.

=== Miss California USA 2016 and Miss USA 2016 ===
Representing Corona del Mar, Mejía was crowned Miss California USA 2016 on December 6, 2015. At Miss USA 2016, she was voted Fan Favorite and placed in the Top 5.

=== Miss Universe Ecuador 2024 ===
In January 2024, Mejía joined the virtual casting for the inaugural Miss Universe Ecuador pageant. She was selected among 25 candidates and later designated as the representative of the Ecuadorian community in the United States. She placed first runner-up.

=== Miss Universe Ecuador 2025 ===
On July 26, 2025, Mejía represented again the Ecuadorian community in the United States at Miss Universe Ecuador 2025, held at the Palacio de Cristal in Guayaquil. She won the title and represented Ecuador at Miss Universe 2025 in Thailand, where she was Unplaced.

== Advocacy ==
During the Miss USA 2016 competition, Mejía discussed her experience with anorexia nervosa, which she has addressed publicly in interviews. Her advocacy initiative, titled I Am Enough, focuses on promoting self-acceptance and encouraging young people to embrace their individuality.

== Personal life ==
In April 2023, Mejía married Australian Survivor contestant Sam Webb in a beachfront ceremony in Nuevo Vallarta, Mexico.

Awards and achievements
Preceded by Natasha Martinez	Miss California USA; 2016	Succeeded by India Williams
Preceded by First	Miss Universe Ecuador 1st Runner-Up; 2024	Succeeded by Daphne Currat
Preceded by Mara Topić	Miss Universe Ecuador; 2025	Succeeded by Dalia Bucaram
