= Orellana Province =

Province of Ecuador

Coordinates: 0°56′S 75°40′W

Orellana
- Province
- Province of Orellana
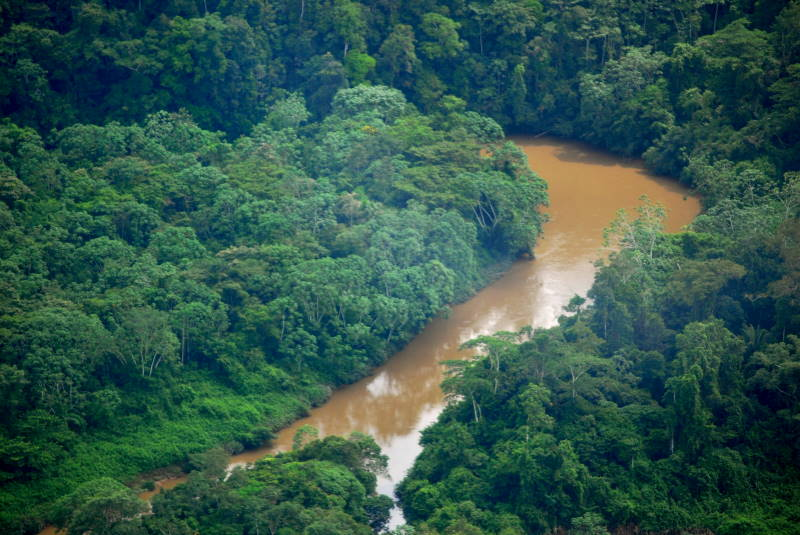
- Yasuní National Park

- Flag

- Location of Orellana Province in Ecuador.

- Cantons of Orellana Province
- Country: Ecuador
- Established: July 28, 1998
- Founder: Alejandro Labaca
- Named for: Francisco de Orellana
- Capital: Puerto Francisco de Orellana (El Coca)
- Cantons: List of Cantons

Government
  - Perfect: Magali Orellana (UP)
  - Governor: Alexandra Maricela Villavicencio Quezada

Area
  - Total: 21,601 km^{2} (8,340 sq mi)

Population (2022 census)
  - Total: 182,166
  - Density: 8.4332/km^{2} (21.842/sq mi)
- Time zone: UTC-5 (ECT)
- Vehicle registration: Q
- HDI (2017): 0.701 high · 23rd
- Website: www.orellana.gob.ec

Orellana (Spanish pronunciation: [oɾeˈʝana]) is an inland province of Ecuador. The capital is Puerto Francisco de Orellana (also known as Coca). It was created on July 30, 1998, from part of Napo Province.

The name of the province derives from the explorer Francisco de Orellana who it is told to have sailed from somewhere near the town to the Atlantic Ocean. He did this trip several times looking for the gold city of El Dorado and in search of a rumored Nutmeg forest which at the time was a very expensive spice. During his voyages he met a ferocious tribe of Indians who attacked his ships and many among them were women. This led to the naming of the river as the Amazon river.

On October 10, 2024, the governors of four provinces, including Orellana Province, were replaced by president Daniel Noboa, per Executive Order 420. Alexandra Maricela Villavicencio Quezada, the current governor, was appointed to replace former governor Nuvia Vega.

== Cantons ==
The province is divided into four cantons. The following table lists each with its population at the 2001 census, its area in square kilometres (km^{2}), and the name of its canton seat or capital.

Canton	Pop. (2001)	Area (km^{2})	Seat/Capital
Aguarico	4,658	11,358	Nuevo Rocafuerte
Francisco de Orellana	42,010	6,995	Puerto Francisco de Orellana (Coca)
Joya de los Sachas	26,363	1,195	La Joya de los Sachas
Loreto	13,462	2,127	Loreto

== Demographics ==
Ethnic groups as of the Ecuadorian census of 2010:

- Mestizo 57.5%
- Indigenous 31.8%
- Afro-Ecuadorian 4.9%
- White 4.4%
- Montubio 1.2%
- Other 0.2%

== Economy ==
Jungle composes most of the province's territory, forcing it to rely primarily on exports of crude oil, and timber. Its second most important source of income is tourism, offering jungle exploration, indigenous encounters, and rivers. Mining is the third reliable source of income.

== Places of interest ==
- Cuyabeno Wildlife Reserve

== See also ==
- Cantons of Ecuador
