= Guayaquil Canton =

Guayaquil
- Canton
- Municipality of Guayaquil
- Flag Coat of arms

- Location of Guayaquil Canton in Guayas Province

- Location of Guayas Province
- Coordinates: 2°11′S 79°53′W
- Country: Ecuador
- Province: Guayas
- Foundation: June 25, 1538
- Founder: Francisco de Orellana
- Named for: Guayas River
- Seat: Guayaquil
- Parishes: List of parishes: Ayauchco; Bolivar (Sagrario); Carbo (Concepcion); Febres Cordero; Garcia Moreno; Letamendi; Nueve de Octubre; Olmedo (San Alejo); Roca; Rocafuerte; Sucre; Tarqui; Urdaneta; Ximena; Juan Gomez Rendon (Progreso); Morro; Posorja; Puna; Tenguel

Government
  - Mayor: Aquiles Álvarez

Area
  - Canton: 4,830 km^{2} (1,860 sq mi)

Population (2022 census)
  - Canton: 2,746,403
  - Density: 569/km^{2} (1,470/sq mi)
  - Urban: 2,650,288
- Time zone: UTC-5 (ECT)
- Website: https://www.guayaquil.gob.ec/

The Guayaquil Canton, officially the Municipality of Guayaquil, is a canton in the center of the Guayas Province in western Ecuador. The canton was named after its seat, the city of Guayaquil, the most populous city in Ecuador.

== Political divisions ==
The canton is divided into 16 urban parishes and 5 rural parishes. The urban parishes make up the city of Guayaquil.

Urban parishes

- Ayacucho
- Bolivar (Sagario)
- Carbo (Concepcion)
- Chongón
- Febres Cordero
- Garcia Moreno
- Letamendi
- Nueva de Octubre
- Olmedo (San Alejo)
- Pascuales
- Roca
- Rocafuerte
- Sucre
- Tarqui
- Urdaneta
- Ximena

Rural parishes

- Juan Gomez Rendon (Progreso)
- Morro
- Posorja
- Puná
- Tenguel

== Demographics ==
Ethnic groups as of the Ecuadorian census of 2010:

- Mestizo 70.8%
- White 11.4%
- Afro-Ecuadorian 10.9%
- Montubio 5.0%
- Indigenous 1.4%
- Other 0.6%
