= Machala =

- City / Urban Locality
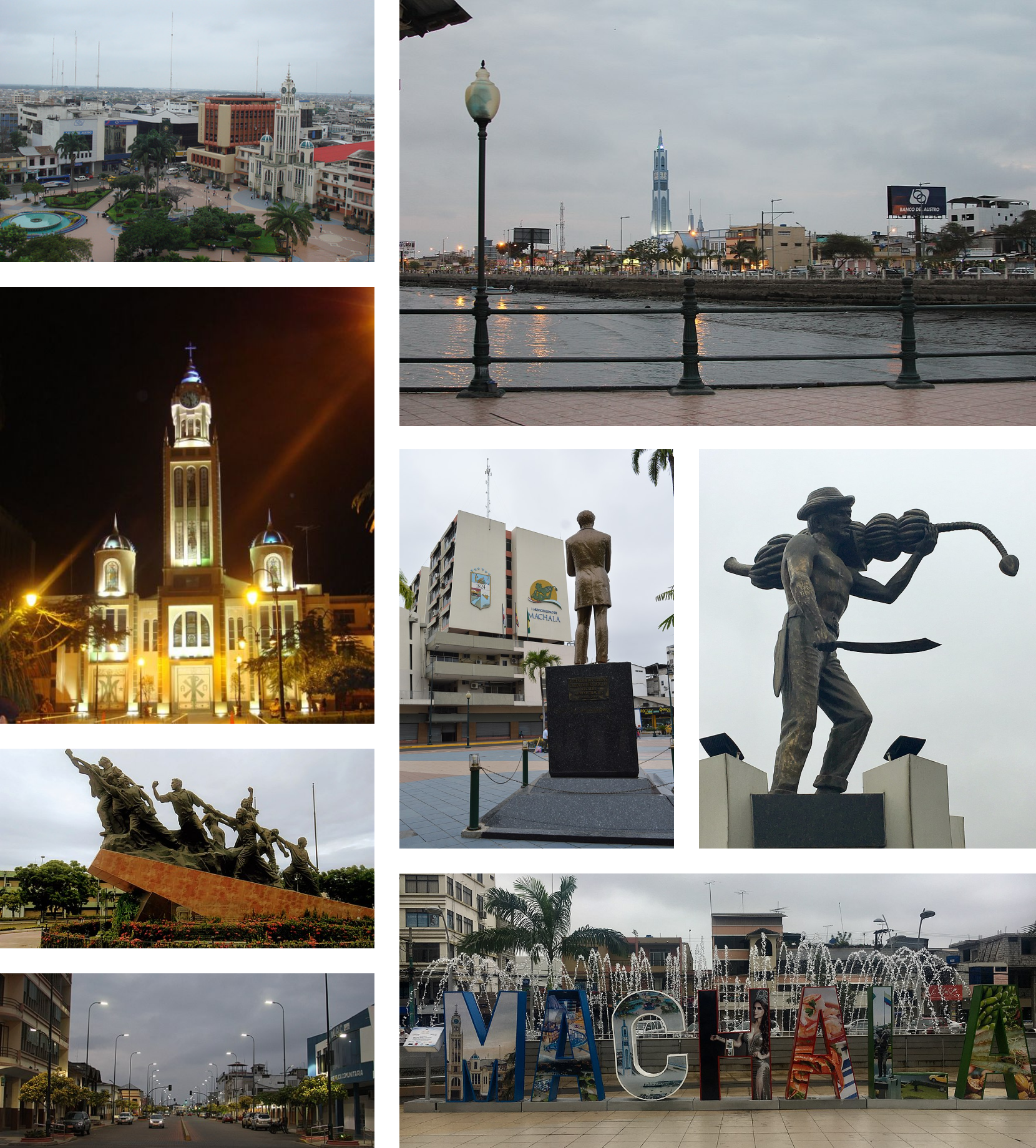
- From top, left to right: Juan Montalvo Central Park, Bolivar Port, Our Lady of Mercy Cathedral, monument to Juan Montalvo in front of the City hall of Machala, monument to the Bananero, monument to the founding of UTMACH, Columbus Square and Municipalidad street.

- Flag
- Nickname: Banana Capital of the World
- Location within Ecuador Location within South America
- Coordinates: 3°16′S 79°58′W
- Country: Ecuador
- Province: El Oro
- Canton: Machala
- Founded: 1573

Government
  - Mayor: Dario Macas Salvatierra

Area
  - City: 42.91 km^{2} (16.57 sq mi)
- Elevation: 6 m (20 ft)

Population (2022 census)
  - City: 288,072
  - Rank: 6th in Ecuador
  - Density: 6,713/km^{2} (17,390/sq mi)
  - Urban: 301,771
  - Metro: 576,772
- Demonym: Machaleño / a
- Time zone: UTC-5 (ECT)
- Area code: (+593) 7
- Website: www.machala.gob.ec (in Spanish)

Machala (Spanish pronunciation: [maˈtʃala]) is a city in south-west Ecuador. It is the capital of the El Oro Province, and is located near the Gulf of Guayaquil on fertile lowlands. Machala has a population of 288,072 according to the 2022 census; it is the sixth-biggest city in the country, and the second-most important port city after Guayaquil. It has been referred to as the Banana Capital of the World.

== Economy ==
Machala is a commercial center for the surrounding agricultural region. It is a major trading hub for bananas, coffee, and cocoa. The banana industry is especially oriented toward exports, and plays a huge role in the city's economy. Bananas are shipped out from nearby Puerto Bolívar mainly to North America. 183 kilometres (114 mi) Machala's geographical position near Guayaquil also makes it an important transportation hub. Many travelers heading south to Peru or north to Guayaquil funnel through the city. It is not known as a tourist destination among Ecuadorians or international visitors, but its proximity to the Pacific Ocean makes it a short distance from the beach. The economy of Machala has seen growth as can be seen by the inauguration of its first mall in 2007. The mall has a movie theater in it, on the outskirts of the city.

== Layout ==
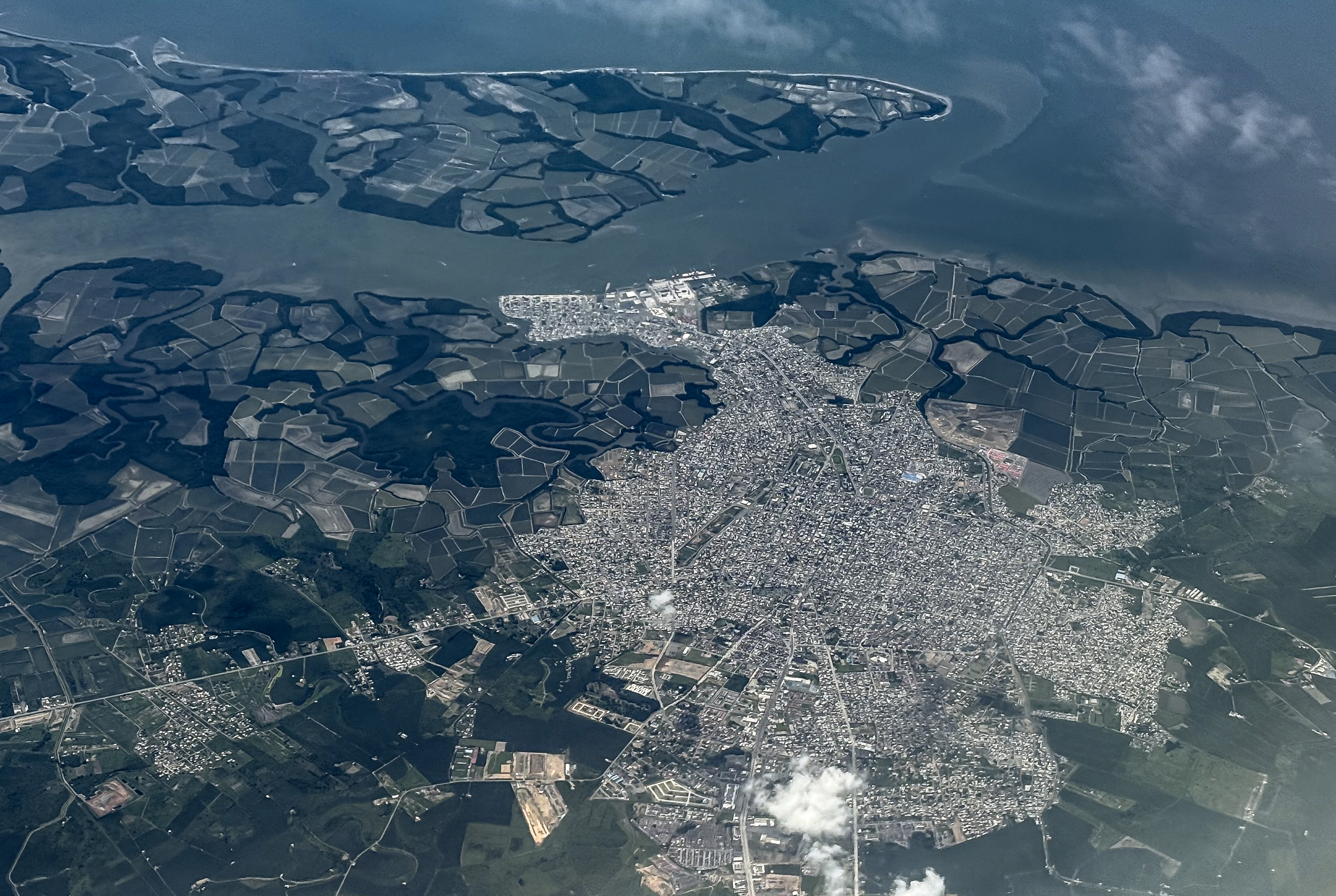
Aerial image of Machala

The center of Machala is dominated by a large Catholic church and a central plaza. The plaza was built in the early 2000s to include a large fountain. There are many hotels situated in the center of the city. Las Brisas, located nearly a mile from the central plaza, is another popular place in Machala; it is a wealthier neighborhood that used to serve as a popular spot for local teenagers, but the remodeling of Zona Rosa, as well as the decreased safety in the area, has led to it becoming less popular.

== Education ==
Machala has one university, the Universidad Técnica de Machala. There are many private schools in Machala and one public high school – Colegio 9 de Octubre. The city serves as a stopping-off point on the way to nearby Puerto Bolívar and the Jambelí Islands, which can only be reached by ferry.

== Climate ==
Machala features a hot semi-arid climate (Köppen BSh). Like most of the coastal region of Ecuador, there is a short wet season from January to April due to the retreat of the Humboldt Current. The weather in both wet and dry seasons is very warm to hot and cloudy due to persistent fog from the cold current.

Climate data for Machala (General Manuel Serrano Airport), elevation 10 m (33 ft), (1971–2000)
Month	Jan	Feb	Mar	Apr	May	Jun	Jul	Aug	Sep	Oct	Nov	Dec	Year
Mean daily maximum °C (°F)	30.9 (87.6)	31.2 (88.2)	31.5 (88.7)	31.4 (88.5)	30.2 (86.4)	28.3 (82.9)	27.1 (80.8)	26.9 (80.4)	27.1 (80.8)	27.2 (81.0)	28.3 (82.9)	30.1 (86.2)	29.2 (84.5)
Mean daily minimum °C (°F)	22.8 (73.0)	23.0 (73.4)	23.0 (73.4)	23.4 (74.1)	22.9 (73.2)	21.8 (71.2)	20.8 (69.4)	20.3 (68.5)	20.3 (68.5)	20.6 (69.1)	20.7 (69.3)	21.9 (71.4)	21.8 (71.2)
Average precipitation mm (inches)	63.0 (2.48)	100.0 (3.94)	117.0 (4.61)	59.0 (2.32)	18.0 (0.71)	13.0 (0.51)	11.0 (0.43)	9.0 (0.35)	8.0 (0.31)	13.0 (0.51)	11.0 (0.43)	16.0 (0.63)	438 (17.23)
Average relative humidity (%)	81	81	80	83	83	86	86	86	86	85	83	81	83
Source: FAO

== Transportation ==
=== Air ===
Santa Rosa International Airport (IATA: ETR, ICAO: SERO) serves as the city's principal airport. It hosts commercial flights to Quito with the Ecuadorian airline TAME.

== Notable residents ==
- Gabriel Achilier (born 1985), footballer
- Diana Blacio was born here and in 2025 she joined the National Assembly.
- Jordy Caicedo (born 1997), footballer
- Gilberto Chamba, serial killer
- Fausto Tutu Guzman (born 1944), great Basketball player and Pajero Professional
- Nicolás Asencio (born 1975), footballer
- Juan Carlos Espinoza Mercado (born 1987), footballer
- Ángel Fernández (born 1971), footballer
- Luis Miguel Garcés (born 1982), footballer
- Hólger Matamoros (born 1985), footballer
- Carlos Muñoz (1964–1993), footballer
- Ismael Pérez Pazmiño (1876–1944), journalist and politician
- Ángel Pután (born 1986), footballer
- Tania Tinoco (1963–2022), journalist and television producer
