= List of earthquakes in Ecuador =

This list of earthquakes in Ecuador is a list of notable earthquakes that have affected Ecuador in recorded history.

== Tectonic setting ==
The active tectonics of Ecuador is dominated by the effects of the subduction of the Nazca plate beneath the South American plate. Ecuador lies within the Northern Volcanic Zone where the subduction zone is moving at a rate of 7 cm/yr to the east-northeast, significantly oblique to the trend of this segment of the Andes. The subduction zone has an overall dip of 25–30°, but varies rapidly along strike due to the effects of subduction of the Carnegie Ridge. The Carnegie Ridge is an oceanic plateau that formed as the Nazca plate passed over the Galapagos hotspot. The plate interface above the subducted part of the ridge has a shallower dip than the area to both north and south, the boundaries interpreted to consist of two large tears in the downgoing Nazca plate. The northern part of Ecuador overlies the subducted part of the Carnegie Ridge and is an area where the Nazca plate is interpreted to be strongly coupled to the South American plate, causing an unusually large degree of intraplate deformation. The main active fault zones of Ecuador are SSW-NNE trending dextral strike-slip faults running parallel to the main subdivisions of the Andes, two major SW-NE dextral strike-slip zones, the Pallatanga and Chingual faults, and north–south trending reverse faults such as the Quito fault.

== Seismicity ==
Earthquakes that affect Ecuador can be divided into those that result from movement on the subduction interface along the plate boundary, those that result from deformation within the South American and Nazca plates and those that are associated with active volcanoes.

=== Interplate earthquakes ===
Megathrust events along the subduction interface generate the largest earthquakes, often triggering destructive tsunamis, such as the 1906 Ecuador–Colombia earthquake.

=== Intraplate earthquakes ===
The most damaging earthquakes to affect Ecuador are those associated with faulting within the South American plate, such as the 1949 Ambato earthquake.

Earthquakes within the downgoing Nazca plate, such as the M_{w} 7.1 event of August 2010, are generally too deep to cause significant damage in Ecuador although they are felt over a wide area.

=== Volcanic earthquakes ===
Swarms of relatively small earthquakes are commonly associated with volcanic activity, such as the Quito swarm in 1998-1999 related to the Guagua Pichincha volcano.

== List of notable earthquakes ==
Date	Time	Event	Location	MMI	Coord	Deaths	Mag.	Notes	Sources
2023-03-18	17:12	2023 Guayas earthquake	Guayas	VII	2.851°S 79.800°W	18	6.8 M_{w}	Major damage	
2022-07-14	22:30	2022 Guayaquil earthquake	Guayas	V	2.040°S 79.811°W	1	5.7 M_{w}	Minor damage	
2022-03-26	23:28	2022 Esmeraldas earthquake	Esmeraldas	VI	0.909°N 79.589°W	1	5.8 M_{w}	Severe damage	
2019-02-22	10:17	2019 Pastaza earthquake	Pastaza	VII	2.186°S 77.051°W	1	7.5 M_{w}		
2016-04-16	18:58	2016 Ecuador earthquake	Pedernales, Manabí	VIII	0.371°N 79.940°W	676	7.8 M_{w}	Severe damage	
2014-08-12	19:58	2014 Ecuador earthquake	Pichincha	VI	0.02°N 78.32°W	4	5.1 M_{w}		
2010-08-12	11:54	2010 Riobamba earthquake	Riobamba	VI	1.260°S 77.312°W	0	7.1 M_{w}	Minor damage	
1998-08-04	13:59	1998 Bahía de Caráquez earthquake	Bahía de Caráquez, Manabí	VIII	0.593°S 80.393°W	3	7.2 M_{w}		
1987-03-06	01:54 & 04:10	1987 Ecuador earthquakes	Napo	IX	0.07°N 77.75°W	5,000	7.1 M_{w}		
1979-12-12	02:59	1979 Tumaco earthquake	Tumaco	IX	1.598°N 79.358°W	300–600	8.2 M_{w}	Tsunami	
1976-04-09	07:08	1976 Esmeraldas earthquake	Esmeraldas	VIII	0.782°N 79.804°W	10	6.7 M_{w}		
1970-12-10	04:31	1970 Peru–Ecuador earthquake	El Oro	IX	3.99°S 80.72°W	50	7.1 M_{w}		
1958-01-19	09:09	1958 Ecuador–Colombia earthquake	Esmeraldas	VII	1.5°N 79.5°W	111	7.6 M_{w}		
1953-12-12	17:31	1953 Tumbes earthquake	Guayaquil	VIII	3.4°S 80.6°W	7	7.5 M_{w}		
1949-08-05	19:08	1949 Ambato earthquake	Ambato	XI	1.5°S 78.2°W	5,050	6.8 M_{L}		
1942-05-14	21:13	1942 Ecuador earthquake	Pedernales	IX	0.1°S 79.9°W	200	7.8 M_{L}		
1906-01-31	15:36	1906 Ecuador–Colombia earthquake	Esmeraldas	IX	1.0°N 81.5°W	1,000	8.8 M_{w}	Tsunami	
1868-08-16	06:30	1868 Ecuador earthquakes	Ibarra		0.31°N 78.18°W	70,000	6.7 M_{w}		
1797-02-04	12:30	1797 Riobamba earthquake	Riobamba	XI	1.6°S 78.6°W	6,000-40,000	8.3 M_{L}		
1698-06-20	01:00	1698 Ambato earthquake	Carihuairazo	X	1.7°S 78.7°W	6,500+	7.2–7.9 M_{uk}		

Magnitudes – M_{w} Moment magnitude scale, M_{L} Richter scale, M_{s} Surface-wave magnitude

== See also ==
- Geology of Ecuador
