= 1942 Ecuador earthquake =

Earthquake in Ecuador

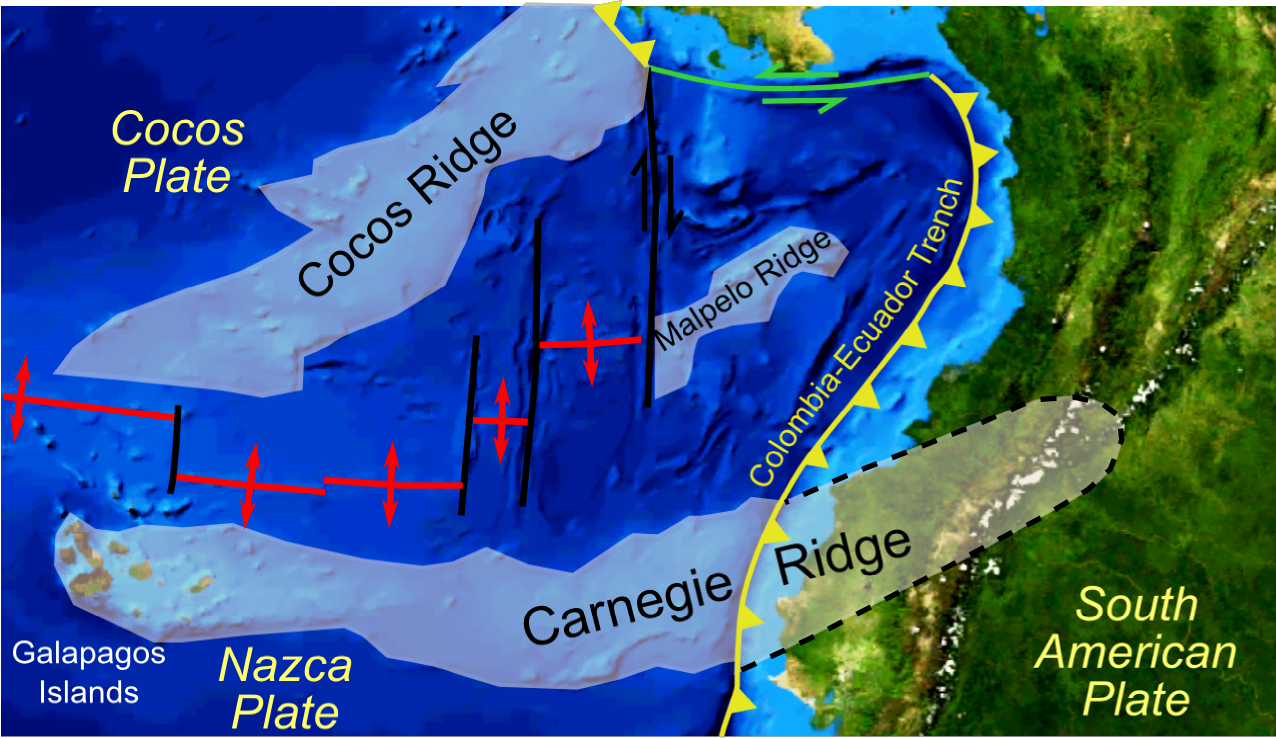
- The earthquake occurred at the northern flank of the Carnegie Ridge beneath the coast of Ecuador

- Location within Ecuador
- UTC time: 1942-05-14 02:13:27
- ISC event: 900274
- USGS-ANSS: ComCat
- Local date: 13 May 1942
- Local time: 21:13 ECT
- Magnitude: M_{w} 7.8–7.9
- Depth: 20 km (12 mi)
- Epicenter: 0.025°N 79.955°W
- Fault: Ecuador–Colombia subduction zone
- Type: Megathrust
- Areas affected: Ecuador
- Total damage: US$2.5 million
- Max. intensity: MMI IX (Violent)
- Tsunami: Yes
- Aftershocks: Yes
- Casualties: 300 dead

The 1942 Ecuador earthquake or the Guayaquil earthquake occurred on 13 May at 21:13 ECT with a moment magnitude (M_{w}) of 7.8–7.9. The earthquake had an epicenter near the coast of Manabí Province, Ecuador. It killed more than 300 people and the total cost of damage was about US$2.5 million. At Guayaquil, 250 km (160 mi) from the epicenter, many reinforced concrete structures in the city were destroyed and high-rise buildings collapsed. At least 100 fatalities were recorded in the city.

The earthquake was caused by movement on a section of the Ecuador–Colombia subduction zone, a seismically active area where the Nazca plate subducts beneath the overriding South American plate. This subduction zone previously ruptured during a much larger earthquake in 1906, and the 1942 event represented a partial re-rupture. The same section that caused the 1942 earthquake would move again in April 2016 with nearly identical characteristics.

== Geology ==
A subduction zone exists off the coast of Ecuador and Colombia due to oblique convergence between the continental South American plate, and oceanic Nazca plate. Along the Ecuador coast, the subduction zone is divided into three segments based on their seismic rupture history. In 1906, a M_{w} 8.8 earthquake ruptured the northern (470 km (290 mi) long) and middle (150 km (93 mi) long) segments. These individual segments subsequently ruptured during the earthquakes of 1942, 1958 and 1979. A southern segment also exists, measuring 300 km (190 mi) long. The central portion of the subduction zone was also responsible for earthquakes in 1896, 1907, 1942, 1956 and 1998. The rate of convergence between these plates is estimated at 5 to 8 cm (2.0 to 3.1 in) per year.

The Carnegie Ridge is a 1,000 km (620 mi) submarine feature which extends from the Galápagos Islands to some point east of the trench. Its collision and subduction introduces asperities and other characteristics that would not be present without. Its buoyancy, for example, may help to lock the plate interface in that area. Modelling of interplate deformation along the coast shows higher amounts of deformation – which is directly related to the locking – in Ecuador compared with Colombia. The buoyancy and locking of the plate interface appears to change both the dynamics of seismicity and the tsunamigenic potential of the subduction zone in the sense that the ridge can act as a barrier to fault ruptures.

== Earthquake ==
The earthquake struck near the coast of Ecuador on 13 May at 21:13 ECT. It measured 7.8–7.9 on the moment magnitude scale, had a hypocentral depth of 20 km (12 mi), and an epicenter about 15 km (9.3 mi) west of Pedernales. It was caused by a rupture initiating on the subduction interface at the northern flank of the subducting Carnegie Ridge. All of the seismic energy was released in one episode which lasted 22 seconds; a limited rupture likely due to the asperities of the rugged and irregular ridge. A relocation of the aftershocks and an examination of their distribution (most were north of the epicenter) suggested that the slip dimensions were about 200 km (120 mi) long by 90 km (56 mi) across.

The 1942 earthquake was the first in a sequence of shocks that would re-rupture the Ecuador–Colombia subduction zone since 1906; subsequent events would occur in 1958 and 1979. In 2016, a M_{w} 7.8 earthquake ruptured the portion of the subduction zone that was involved in the 1942 event, north of a 1998 rupture. The 2016 event caused 2 m (6 ft 7 in) of slip, which is indicative of the accumulated strain while it was locked. The earthquakes of 1942 and 2016 (with epicenters just 42 km (26 mi) apart) are part of a cycle with an average recurrence interval of 74 years, indicating the next event may occur around 2090.

== Impact ==
The earthquake caused more than 300 deaths across Ecuador and US$2.5 million in damage. Despite being about 250 km (160 mi) from the epicenter, the city of Guayaquil experienced the heaviest damage. More than 100 people died there, and numerous high-rise buildings collapsed. Damage was reported in the provinces of Manabí, Guayas, Los Ríos, Esmeraldas, Bolívar and Imbabura.

Most of Guayaquil sustained moderate damage evaluated on the Mercalli intensity as VI–VII (Strong–Very strong). Several reinforced concrete buildings the downtown area were heavily damaged and corresponded with IX (Violent). In the central, southern, and western parts of the city, situated on loose soil, the damage was evaluated at VIII (Severe), while areas on harder bedrock experienced VI (Strong) intensity. Forty people were killed by collapsed buildings; the greatest loss of life occurred at the corner of Pichincha and Colón streets when a five-storey clinic collapsed. In the same area, electricity and tram services were disrupted. Three buildings with four or five floors collapsed while others with three floors or more were heavily damaged. The greatest degree of damage occurred on the first floor of these buildings. Fractured columns and walls, toppled facades, and tilting occurred in other buildings.

Three buildings had beams on their first floor so badly damaged that supports had to be installed immediately before they could be repaired or demolished. The location where the strongest intensity was felt in Guayaquil is just west of the Guayas River and south of Cerro Del Carmen. The city was constructed above water-saturated clay and alluvium deposited by the river. This soil condition amplified the seismic waves as it propagated beneath the city which worsened the strength of strong ground motion. Additional damage was reported in the cities of Chone, Portoviejo, Manta, Junín, Calcetan and Pedernales. In the Naranjal Canton, large fissures formed in the ground which allowed a "foamy liquid" to erupt. Many homes and buildings situated along the coast were seriously damaged or destroyed. The shaking was felt as far as the Oriente region in the east and in the border towns of Colombia towards the north. A moderate tsunami was also reported along the coast, causing minor damage and a few fatalities. Additionally, two strong aftershocks rocked the coast of Ecuador, causing more panic. During the night, many residents of Guayaquil slept in public parks or in their vehicles. The earthquake also caused disruption and damage to water infrastructure such as leaks at various places, forcing services to be limited to a few hours at certain times of the day. However, within a week, most pipelines were repaired. Electrical and telephone services were also affected, plunging the city into darkness, and in other instances, these service were intentionally cut to prevent short circuits and fires.

== See also ==
- Characteristic earthquake
- List of earthquakes in 1942
- List of earthquakes in Ecuador
