= 2023 Guayas earthquake =

Magnitude 6.8 earthquake in Ecuador

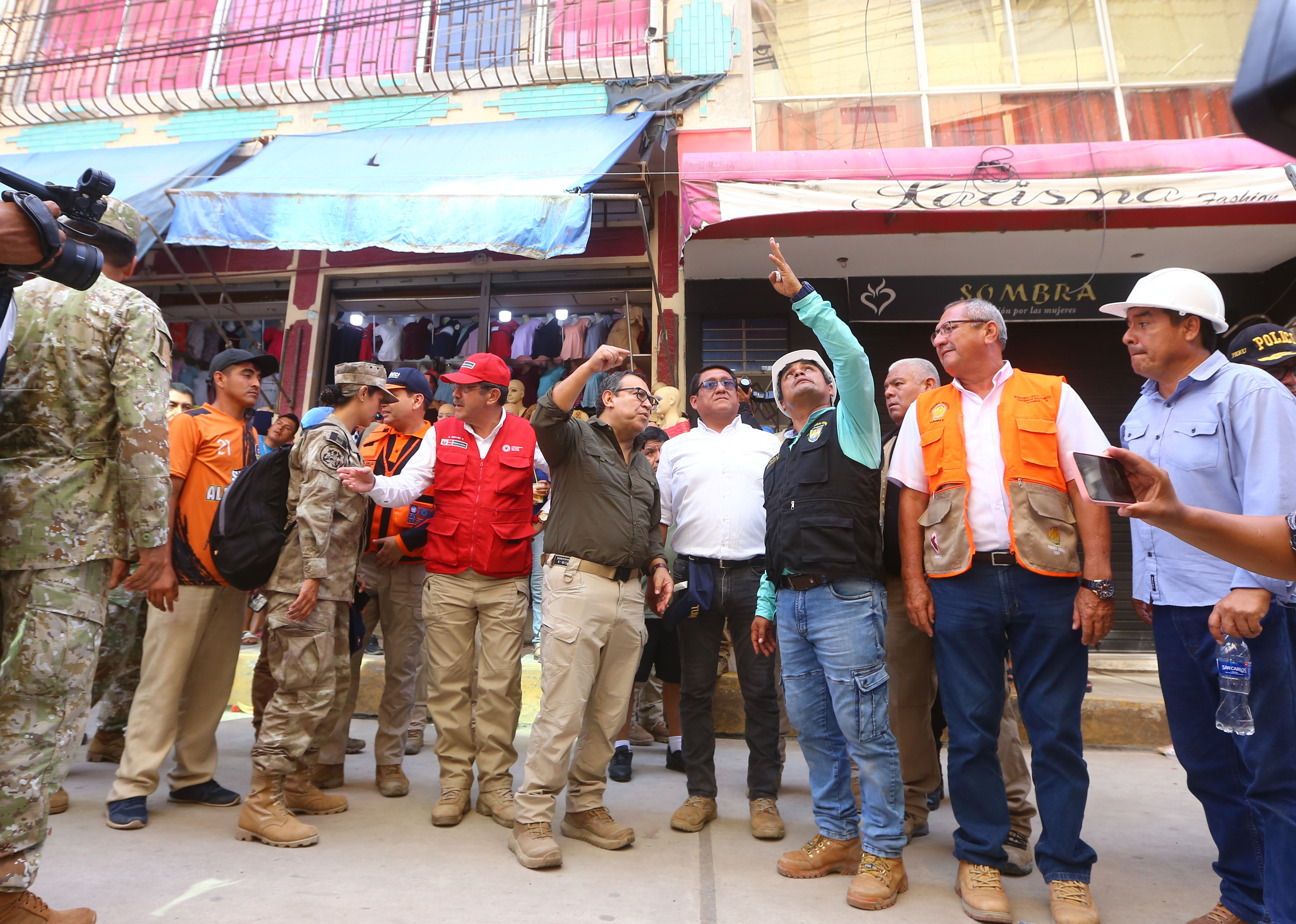
- Authorities are assessing the damage in Tumbes, Peru

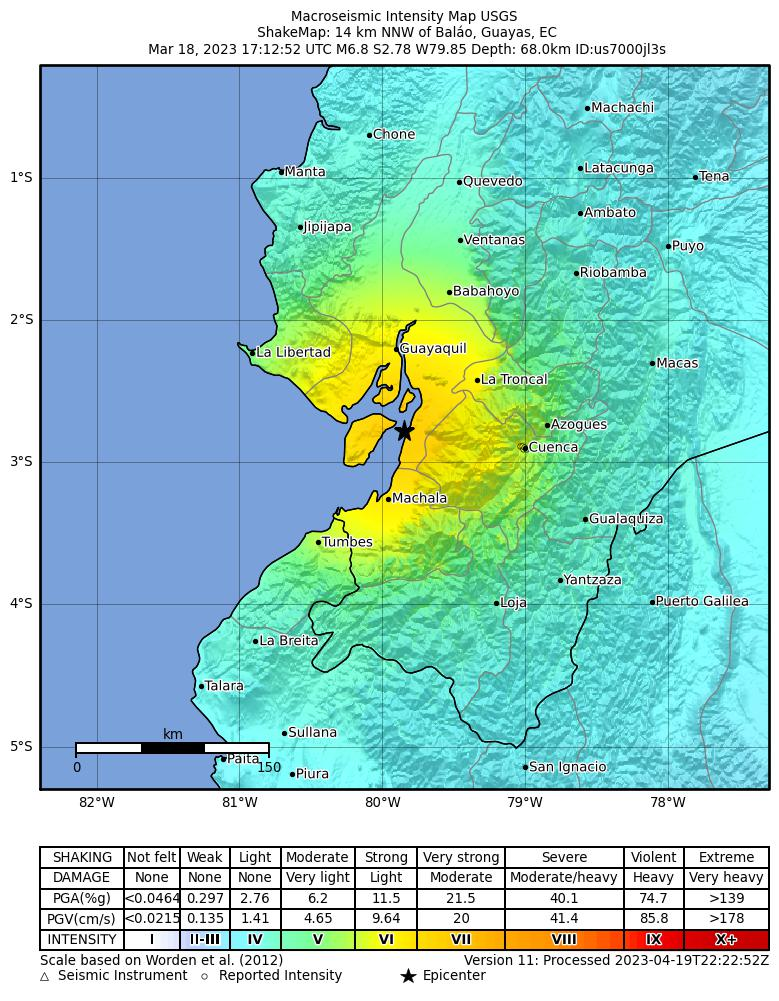
- USGS Shakemap

- Location within Ecuador
- UTC time: 2023-03-18 17:12:52
- ISC event: 625890953
- USGS-ANSS: ComCat
- Local date: 18 March 2023
- Local time: 12:12 ECT (UTC-5)
- Magnitude: 6.8 M_{w}
- Depth: 68.0 km (42.3 mi)
- Epicenter: 2.851°S 79.800°W
- Type: Oblique-slip
- Areas affected: Ecuador and Peru
- Max. intensity: EMS-98 VI (Slightly damaging)
- Casualties: 18 dead, 495 injured (Note: 16 dead and 494 injured in Ecuador, 2 dead and one injured in Peru.)

A strong earthquake struck southern Ecuador on 18 March 2023. It measured 6.8 on the moment magnitude scale, and struck with a hypocenter 68.0 km (42.3 mi) deep. The epicenter was located in the Gulf of Guayaquil, off the coast of Balao Canton and about 80 kilometres (50 mi) south of Guayaquil. There was major damage, 446 injuries and 16 fatalities in Ecuador's El Oro, Azuay and Guayas provinces. Two additional fatalities and dozens of injuries were reported in Peru.

== Tectonic setting ==
The active tectonics of Ecuador is dominated by the effects of the subduction of the Nazca plate beneath the South American plate. Ecuador lies within the Northern Volcanic Zone where the subduction zone is moving at a rate of 7 cm/yr to the east-northeast, significantly oblique to the trend of this segment of the Andes. The subduction zone has an overall dip of 25–30°, but varies rapidly along strike due to the effects of subduction of the Carnegie Ridge. The Carnegie Ridge is an oceanic plateau that formed as the Nazca plate passed over the Galapagos hotspot. The plate interface above the subducted part of the ridge has a shallower dip than the area to both north and south, the boundaries interpreted to consist of two large tears in the downgoing Nazca plate. The northern part of Ecuador overlies the subducted part of the Carnegie Ridge and is an area where the Nazca plate is interpreted to be strongly coupled to the South American plate, causing an unusually large degree of intraplate deformation. The main active fault zones of Ecuador are SSW-NNE trending dextral strike-slip faults running parallel to the main subdivisions of the Andes, two major SW-NE dextral strike-slip zones, the Pallatanga and Chingual faults, and north–south trending reverse faults such as the Quito fault. Large earthquakes are common in Ecuador. In the past century, 32 earthquakes M6.0 and larger have occurred within 250 km of this event. On 16 April 2016, a magnitude 7.8 earthquake on the subduction zone interface ~350 km north of the 2023 event resulted in over 600 deaths and over 27,000 injuries.

== Earthquake ==
The earthquake had a magnitude of M_{w}6.8 and estimated maximum MMI of VII (Very strong), according to the United States Geological Survey (USGS). The European-Mediterranean Seismological Centre reported a magnitude of M_{w}6.7. According to the USGS PAGER service, shaking intensity V–VII (Moderate–Very Strong) was felt by 8.41 million people, nearly half of Ecuador's population, including intensity VI (Strong) in Guayaquil. It was felt in 13 of the country's 24 provinces. The country's Geophysical Institute of the National Polytechnic School reported the EMS-98 intensity was V–VI (Strong–Slightly damaging) in southern Guayas Province. Intensity V–VI was also observed in Machala, Santa Rosa and Huaquillas.

The earthquake occurred as the result of oblique-slip faulting at an intermediate depth near the subduction interface of the Nazca and South American plates. Its faulting mechanism and depth suggest the event occurred within the subducted lithosphere of the Nazca plate. Focal mechanism solutions indicate that rupture occurred on either a near vertically dipping fault striking to the southeast or a moderately dipping fault striking to the southwest. At the location of the earthquake, the Nazca plate moves to the east relative to the South American plate at a velocity of about 73 mm (2.9 in) per year. Earthquakes in Ecuador and most of western South America are caused by the strains generated by ongoing subduction.

Events such as this are called intermediate-depth earthquakes, occurring at 70–300 km (43–186 mi) depth. Intermediate-depth earthquakes represent deformation within subducted slabs rather than at the shallow plate interface between subducting and overriding tectonic plates. Typically less damaging on the ground surface above their epicenter than is the case with similar-magnitude shallow-focus earthquakes, but can still be destructive. Large intermediate-depth earthquakes may be felt at large distances from their epicenters.

== Impact ==
=== Ecuador ===
The quake was felt in 13 of the country's 24 provinces. A total of 96 houses collapsed and 318 houses, 148 schools, 55 health facilities, 54 public infrastructure, 56 private infrastructure, and one bridge were damaged. At least 494 people were injured across the country.

==== El Oro ====
In El Oro, 40 houses collapsed and 12 people – including an infant and five members of a single family – were killed, mostly in the city of Machala. Three people died when a tower collapsed. In Puerto Bolívar, a building housing a museum and a restaurant collapsed into the sea. Collapsed buildings in the province trapped many people. One Peruvian resident was among the dead in the province. In the southern parts of some places in the province, telephone lines were downed and power outages occurred.

==== Guayas ====
In Guayaquil, 6 buildings collapsed and 73 buildings and houses were damaged, glass was broken, some walls collapsed, and stores were closed across the city. Power outages affected the city, with the northern and southern sectors had no electricity for as long as seven hours, while in some other areas, electricity was restored after 30 minutes. Three vehicle tunnels in the city were also closed, and one person was injured. One person died in Naranjal. On Puná Island, one of the closest areas to the epicenter, 10 houses collapsed.

==== Azuay ====
Two people died in Cuenca, the provincial capital, including one person killed when a house façade collapsed onto a car; another two were injured. Two houses were destroyed and another four were damaged in the province.

=== Peru ===
In Tumbes, close to Peru's border with Ecuador, a four-year-old girl was killed when the roof of a house fell, while a teenager was killed after a house collapsed. Another child was injured, and some others due to landslides. Six houses collapsed, and 46 houses, two health facilities and 12 schools were damaged in the region's three provinces. Thirty-nine people were left homeless and another 101 were affected.

== Response ==
The Ecuadorian Secretariat for Risk Management said firefighters were deployed in search and rescue operations. The National Police conducted damage assessments. President Guillermo Lasso urged citizens to remain calm, adding that "Emergency teams are mobilising to offer all their support to those who have been affected." Toppled power lines interrupting communication and electricity services hampered rescue work. Three facilities of Petroecuador suspended operations temporarily.

Ecuador's president, Guillermo Lasso, visited the affected provinces on 19 March. He said the number of deaths and injuries could rise over the next few hours. Emergency funds for health and housing were opened, and a 60-day state of emergency was declared for the 14 provinces affected by the earthquake. The Confederation of Indigenous Nationalities of Ecuador initiated an aid campaign for those affected.

In March 2023, Blanca Sacancela failed to get a debate at the National Assembly regarding her proposal that the assembly's members should give 50% of their salaries to the victims of the recent earthquake.

== See also ==
- List of earthquakes in 2023
- List of earthquakes in Ecuador
- List of earthquakes in Peru
