= 1949 Ambato earthquake =

Earthquake in Ecuador

- Location within Ecuador
- UTC time: 1949-08-05 19:08:52
- ISC event: 896736
- USGS-ANSS: ComCat
- Local date: August 5, 1949
- Local time: 14:08:52
- Magnitude: 6.4 M_{s}
- Epicenter: 1.5°S 78.2°W
- Areas affected: Ecuador
- Max. intensity: MMI XI (Extreme)
- Casualties: 5,050

A magnitude 6.4 M_{s} earthquake struck Ecuador's Tungurahua Province southeast of its capital Ambato and killed 5,050 people on August 5, 1949. The nearby villages of Guano, Patate, Pelileo, and Pillaro were destroyed, and the city of Ambato suffered heavy damage. The earthquake flattened buildings and subsequent landslides caused damage throughout the Tungurahua, Chimborazo, and Cotopaxi Provinces. It disrupted water mains and communication lines and opened a fissure into which the small town of Libertad sank. Moderate shaking from the event extended as far away as Quito and Guayaquil.

Earthquakes in Ecuador stem from two major interrelated tectonic areas: the subduction of the Nazca plate under the South American plate and the Andean Volcanic Belt. The 1949 Ambato earthquake initially followed an intersection of several northwest–southeast-trending faults in the Inter-Andean Valley which were created by the subduction of the Carnegie Ridge. Strata of rock cracked as the earthquake ruptured the faults, sending out powerful shock waves. Today threats exist throughout the country from both interplate and intraplate seismicity.

== Background ==
Earthquakes are common in Ecuador. Near the Nazca subduction zone the recorded history of interplate earthquakes spans 80 years. At the time it struck the 1949 Ambato earthquake was the second-worst earthquake in Ecuador's modern history topped only by the 1797 Riobamba earthquake. Several major and deadly earthquakes have occurred throughout the country since 1949, including the 1987 Ecuador earthquakes and the 2016 Ecuador earthquake. The 2007 Peru earthquake also affected the country.

== Geology ==
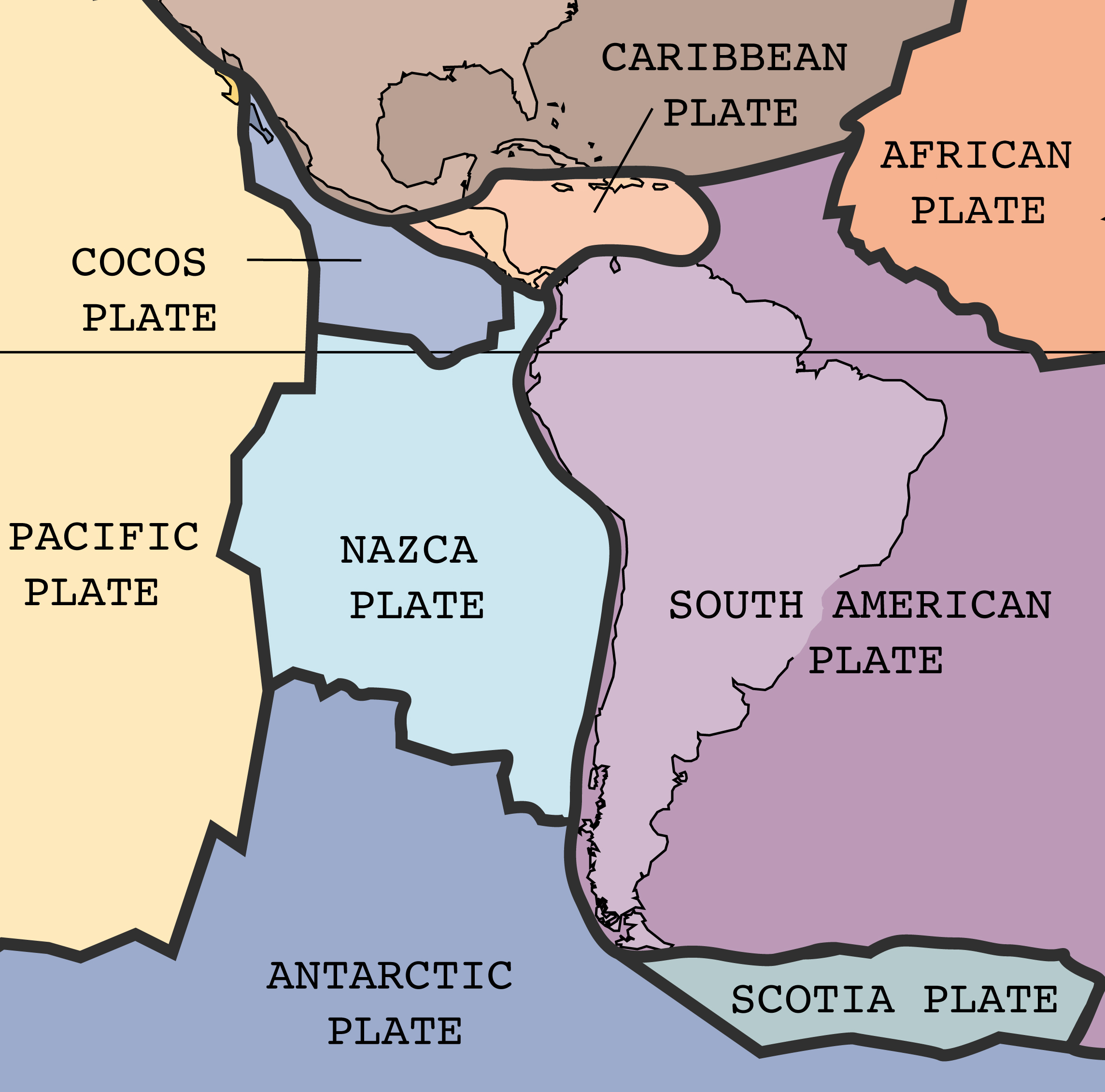
The Nazca plate is being subducted under the South American plate, generating volcanism and extensive seismicity

Much of South American seismic activity and volcanism originates from subduction of the oceanic Nazca plate under the continental South American plate and subduction of the Pacific's lithosphere under the South American continent. This seismicity extends for 6,000 km (3,728 mi) along the continent's western edge and probably stems from a region of northeast-trending faulting near the Ecuadorian Trench. The region of faulting may actually function as its own microplate.

The Carnegie Ridge is sliding under Ecuadorian land, causing coastal uplift and volcanism. The ridge's movement may also have changed the type of faulting along the coast, causing strike-slip faults (faults that move horizontally past each other). Evidence of this subduction altering the course of faulting is found at the Yaquina fault, which, unlike the rest of the Panama Basin faults, trends to the west instead of north–south, indicating that the Carnegie Ridge may be colliding with the continental mass of Ecuador. This collision created northwest–southeast and northeast–southwest-trending faults in the region, and with that, caused strong earthquakes in Riobamba in 1797 and Alausi in 1961. Several of the northwest–southeast-trending faults converge in the Inter-Andean Valley where the 1949 Ambato earthquake took place.

The hypocenter of the earthquake occurred 40 km (25 mi) beneath the surface, under a mountain 72 km (45 mi) from Ambato. Nearby faults ruptured, breaking rock strata and sending shock waves to the surface capable of bringing down entire buildings. Life reported that local seismologists first placed the earthquake's magnitude at 7.5, but the official measurement was later revised to 6.4 M_{s}. The earthquake originated from a hypocenter 15 km beneath the surface.

== Damage and casualties ==
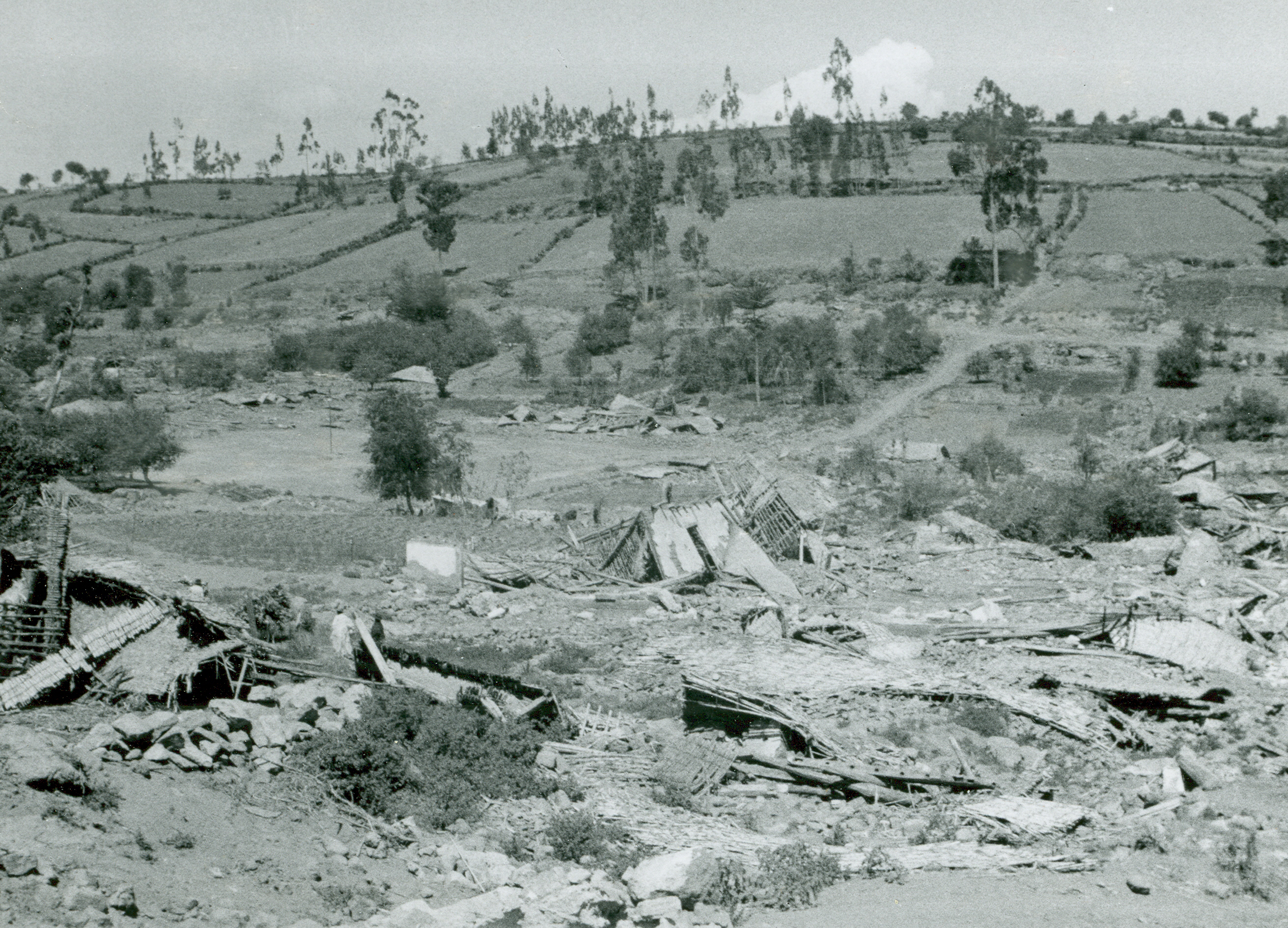
The ruins of homes in Pelileo after the earthquake

The earthquake was preceded by a foreshock, which, although modest, was strong enough to cause chaos and force people to flee from their homes into the streets. The main shock originated southeast of Ambato. When the primary shock hit Ambato's main cathedral and military barracks collapsed, as did most of the city's buildings, scores of young girls preparing for their First Communion perished in the cathedral. The shaking ruptured water mains, disabled communication lines, opened cracks in the earth, reduced bridges to rubble, and derailed a train. The earthquake demolished buildings in rural hamlets; closer to the nearest mountains of the Andes, landslides destroyed roads and blocked rivers. The village of Libertad near Pelileo sank 460 m (1,509 ft) into a huge hole about 800 m (2,625 ft) in diameter with all of its 100 inhabitants. Shaking up to intensity IV extended as far away as Quito and Guayaquil.

Initial reports (around August 7) estimated the death toll at 2,700 people. The cities of Patate and Pelileo suffered the most with 1,000 and 1,300 dead respectively. In Ambato reports of the death toll ranged from 400 to 500, and the Ecuadorean Embassy in Washington, D.C., estimated that 1,000 to more than 2,000 people were injured. The town of Pillaro, destroyed by the quake, had more than 20 dead, and in Latacunga, 11 were killed and 30 injured; 50 homes, two churches, and the local government building were also ruined. Fifteen other towns and cities were also badly affected, including Guano which was devastated.

Later counts assumed around 3,200 casualties in Pelileo; the total death toll estimates were adjusted to around 4,000 people. Officials reported that many of the dead had been inside buildings as they buckled or were killed by flooding brought about by the blockage of a drainage canal. Others were crushed by landslides from nearby mountains. No homes in the city of Pelileo were left standing, many buildings were flattened, and large cracks formed in the ground. In Ambato alone 75 percent of the homes still standing had to be demolished. On August 8, an aftershock with "considerable strength" struck near Ambato.

The final death toll according to the United States Geological Survey was 5,050. The earthquake severely affected some 30 communities and left approximately 100,000 people homeless.

== Relief efforts ==
Ecuador's President Galo Plaza Lasso flew to Ambato to take personal charge of the primary relief efforts. Plaza directed rescue efforts for two days as airlifts from Quito dropped supplies. A group of Red Cross volunteers and medical supplies were sent on American aircraft. The United States Army sent two relief teams equipped with serum and blood plasma. The mayor of Miami along with seven other politicians began a fund-raising campaign for medical needs and clothing and coordinated the distribution of 69 kg (152 lb) of Rexall drugs. Several nearby countries sent airplanes carrying medicine and food. A local fund-raising effort collected 250,000 Ecuadorian sucres (approximately US$14,815 1949) within two hours of its launch. Plaza said "We have not lost our courage. Neither Ambato nor Ecuador shall cry any more, but begin to work."

On August 7, a plane carrying 34 rescue workers from the Shell Oil Company crashed 32 km (20 mi) from Ambato leaving no survivors. Disease began to spread in Pelileo within days of the earthquake, which prompted a team of American soldiers, acting as relief workers, to order water purification devices and DDT airdrops to cleanse the area of airborne agents. Sick victims were quarantined and prevented from leaving the city.

== Aftermath ==
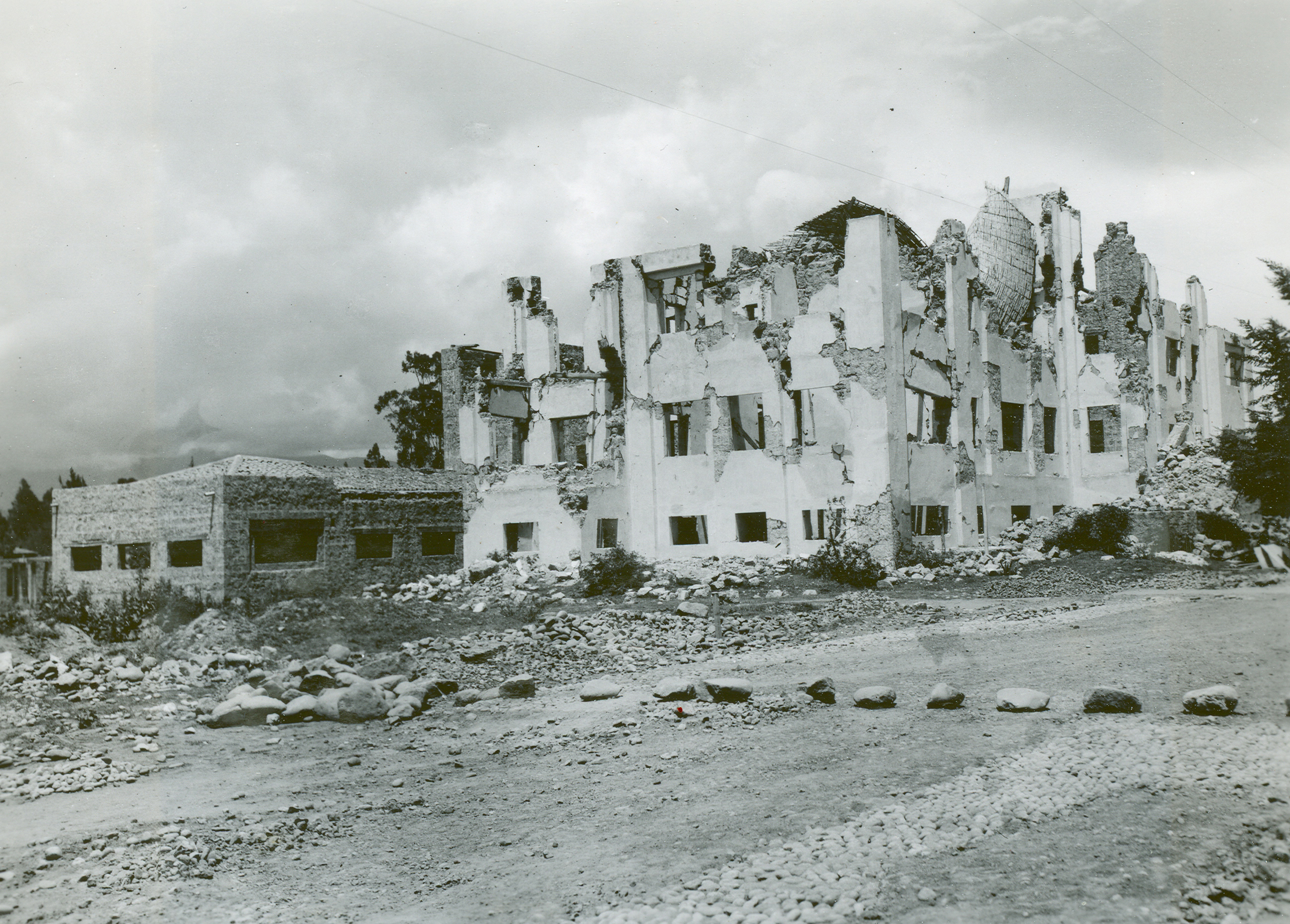
A hospital ruined by the earthquake in Ambato

The earthquake considerably impacted a number of cities: it destroyed Guano, Patate, Pelileo, Pillaro, and one-third of Ambato. The city of Ambato was a "scene of anguish and pain" described by "scores of little funerals winding their way through the debris". The brand-new hospital had been reduced to four walls, and most of the buildings in town were demolished. In Pelileo relief workers found victims feeding buried people through holes in the ground. In the days following the earthquakes aftershocks occurred and torrential rains ensued.

In an effort to help the inhabitants a festival of fruit and flowers was held on June 29, 1950. The festival was a success and became an annual event that is celebrated each year during Carnaval and is now an important tourist attraction. Ambato was completely rebuilt after the earthquake. The city's main church, the Iglesia Matriz de Ambato, was replaced by a new cathedral known as Iglesia La Catedral in 1954. Pelileo was rebuilt on a new site 2 km (1.2 mi) from its previous location.

== Current situation ==
Ambato is frequently visited by tourists traveling on the Pan-American Highway. The city is well known for its extensive market, which sells a wide array of items, including local delicacies and flowers, and for its quintas — old estates that serve as historic parks — some of which pre-date the earthquake.

Ecuador is still at risk from earthquakes: Both intraplate (such as those in March 1987) and interplate earthquakes are possible. Intraplate seismicity poses a more formidable threat, as it can be much more powerful than interplate seismicity and is usually associated with landslides, subsidence, and even soil liquefaction.

== See also ==
- List of earthquakes in 1949
- List of earthquakes in Colombia
- List of earthquakes in Ecuador
