= 1987 earthquake =

1987 earthquake may refer to:

- 1987 Ecuador earthquakes
- 1987 Edgecumbe earthquake (New Zealand)
- 1987 Santiago de Chuco earthquake (Peru)
- 1987 Whittier Narrows earthquake (Los Angeles, California, US)
