= 1698 Ambato earthquake =

Earthquake in Ecuador

- Location within Ecuador
- Local date: 20 June 1698
- Magnitude: 7.2–7.9 M_{uk}
- Epicenter: 1.2°S 78.7°W
- Areas affected: Ecuador
- Max. intensity: MMI X (Extreme)
- Casualties: >6,500 fatalities

The 1698 Ambato earthquake affected the interior of Ecuador on 20 June at 01:00 local time. The earthquake seismic magnitude (M_{uk}) ranged from 7.2 to 7.9. Damage was widespread and extreme in the provinces of Tungurahua, Cotopaxi and Chimborazo. The earthquake also triggered mudflows along the Ambato River destroying a city and killing many residents. An estimated 6,500 fatalities were attributed to the shock and thousands more from the landslides.

== Tectonic setting ==
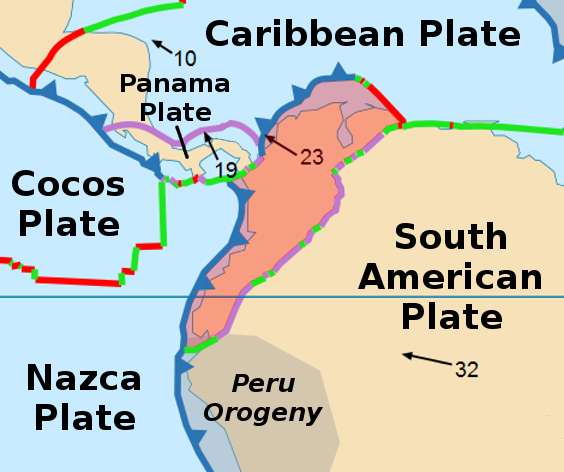
North Andes plate

Central Ecuador features the north Andes mountains which formed by subduction of the Pacific plate beneath the South American plate. Subduction occurs off the coast of Ecuador and Colombia at an oblique angle. This results in crustal deformation inland within the Andes mountains, pushing a tectonic block within the South American plate northeast. This tectonic block, known as the North Andes plate, is bounded by subduction in the west and right-lateral faulting in the east along the Chingual-Cosanga-Pallatanga-Puná Fault. The region hosts shallow crustal earthquakes associated with thrust and strike-slip faulting within the mountain range. Faults within the Andes run parallel to the mountains. The 1797 Riobamba earthquake, which is estimated at M_{w} 7.6 and occurred in the same area as the 1698 event represents one of the largest earthquakes within the Andes.

== Earthquake ==
Reports of large landslides at Carihuairazo suggest an epicenter on the western flank, implying a magnitude of 7.2, but no active fault has been mapped in that area. This earthquake may have been associated with activity on the Latacunga Fault System, a north–south trending reverse fault system running parallel to the mountains, and branching off the Chingual-Cosanga-Pallatanga-Puná Fault. Earthquakes along this fault are characterized by their moderate magnitudes (M_{w} 5.7 ± 0.2), suggesting the system is highly segmented. The 1698 earthquake may have ruptured multiple segments which corresponds to the large magnitude (M_{I} 7.3). The rupture may have extended from southwest of Latacunga to the Chingual-Cosanga-Pallatanga-Puná Fault. Surface ruptures on Igualata Volcano may be associated with either the 1698 or 1797 earthquake. The surface ruptures are characterized by 8–18 m (26–59 ft) of right-lateral and 4 m (13 ft) of vertical offset.

== Impact ==
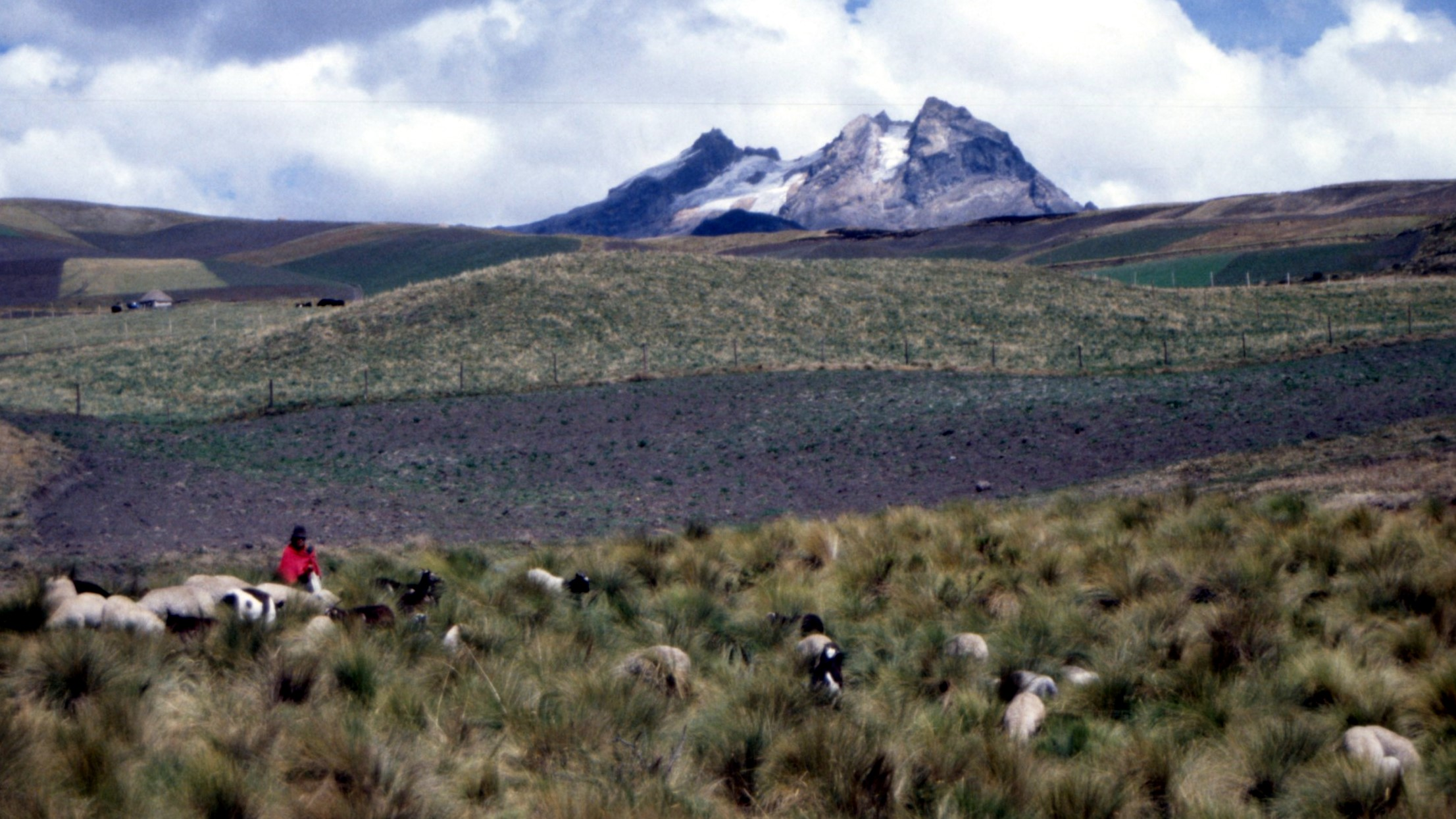
Landslides triggered on Carihuairazo killed thousands of people

The towns of Ambato and Latacunga were totally destroyed; Riobamba suffered partial destruction. In Ambato, over 3,000 people died; 2,000 died in Latacunga and 1,500 died elsewhere. The earthquake occurred at 01:00 local time. At Ambato, all homes collapsed, burying and killing entire families. Some earthquake survivors were trapped under rubble.

Many landslides were triggered on the northeastern slopes of Carihuairazo. The landslides were deposited in the Chiquicahua, Pataló, Quichibi, Terremoto, Yacutoma, Quintuco, Catequilla and Olalla ravines along the volcano. A landslide traveled down the Ambato River, destroying the already devastated town of Ambato; the devastated area was in the present-day location of El Socavón in the city. The landslides destroyed many towns and killed several thousand people, in addition to over 6,000 from the earthquake.

At Ambato, the landslide arrived about 15 minutes after the earthquake. Survivors trapped under rubble were killed; others fled to higher ground. Ambato was located at convergence of many small riverbeds where the landslides traveled, causing debris to spill on both banks. Ambato was buried under 40 m (130 ft) of debris. In the aftermath, only bodies were recovered. It was subsequently relocated to higher ground at its percent location.

These landslides had an estimated minimum volume of 84,000,000–87,000,000 m^{3} (3.0×10^{9}–3.1×10^{9} cu ft), traveled distances of over 54 km (34 mi), covered a 60 km^{2} (23 sq mi) area and were up to 300 m (980 ft) wide. Deposits were between 10 m (33 ft) and 45 m (148 ft) thick; they overlaid ash layers left from the 1640 eruption of Tungurahua. These deposits consisted of fine sand, silt and clay.

== See also ==
- List of earthquakes in Ecuador
- List of historical earthquakes
