= 1868 Ecuador earthquakes =

- Location within Ecuador
- UTC time: Doublet earthquake:
- 1868-08-15 19:30
- 1868-08-16 06:30
- Local date
- 15 August 1868
- 16 August 1868
- Local time
- Afternoon
- 01:30
- Magnitude
- 6.3 M_{w}
- 6.7 M_{w}
- Depth: 20 km (12 mi)
- Epicenter: 0.31°N 78.18°W
- Areas affected: Ecuador, Colombia
- Max. intensity: MMI VIII (Severe); MMI X (Extreme)
- Casualties: 70,000

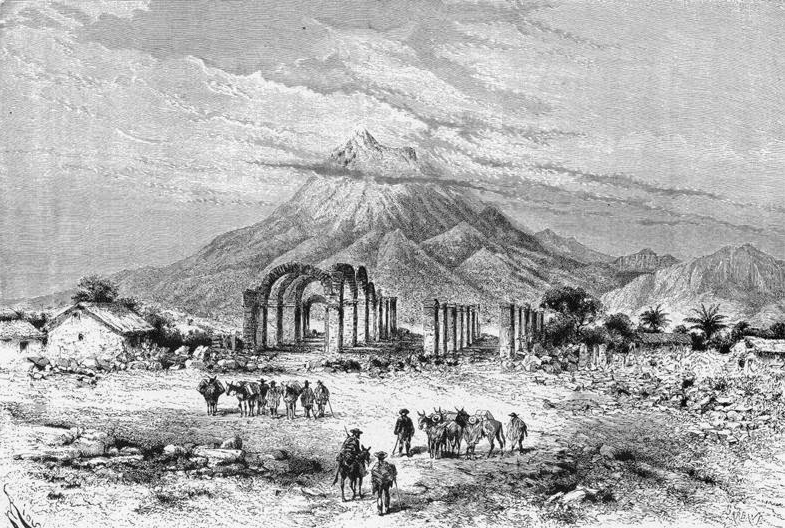
Ruins of the Cathedral at Ibarra in 1875-6

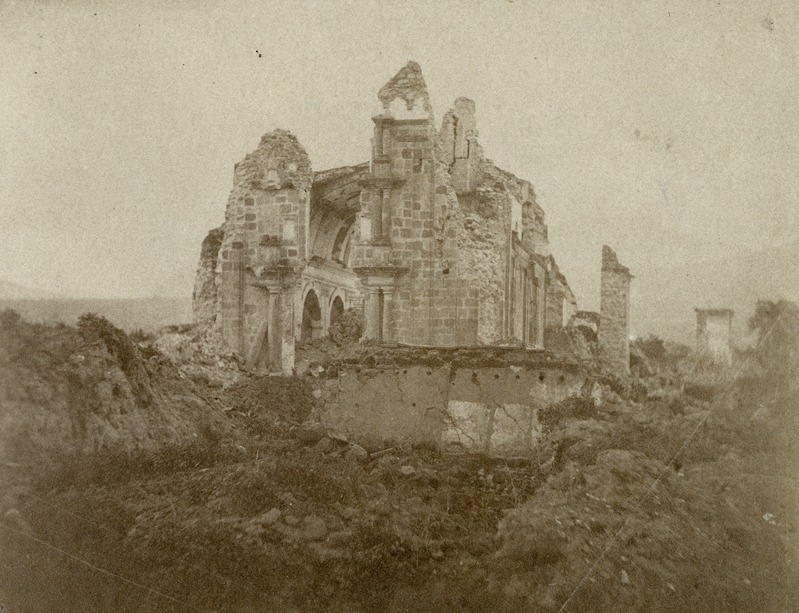
Ruins of the Iglesia de la Compañía, Ibarra, photographed in 1870

The 1868 Ecuador earthquakes occurred at 19:30 UTC on August 15 and 06:30 UTC on 16 August 1868. They caused severe damage in the northeastern part of Ecuador and in southwestern Colombia. They had an estimated magnitude of 6.3 and 6.7 and together caused up to 70,000 casualties. The earthquake of 15 August occurred near El Ángel, Carchi Province, close to the border with Colombia, while that of August 16 occurred near Ibarra in Imbabura Province. Reports of these earthquakes are often confused with the effects of the earthquake of 13 August at Arica.

== Tectonic setting ==
The active tectonics of Ecuador is dominated by the effects of the subduction of the Nazca plate beneath the South American plate. The high degree of coupling across the plate boundary where the Carnegie Ridge is being subducted beneath northern Ecuador causes unusually intense intraplate deformation. Known faults within the area of the earthquake epicenters are the SSW-NNE trending San Isidro, El Ángel, Río Ambi and Otavalo Faults, all considered to be dextral strike-slip faults, sometimes with reverse movement. All these faults are interpreted to have moved in the last 1.6 million years.

== Damage ==
=== 15 August ===
The towns of El Ángel and La Concepcion were severely shaken by the first earthquake and El Ángel was described as "ruined".

=== 16 August ===
Ibarra was devastated, with every building destroyed and only a few walls left standing. Nearby Otavalo was left without a single house standing and 6,000 people died. In Imbabura Province, there were 15–20,000 casualties.

== Characteristics ==
There was a minor foreshock the previous afternoon (possibly the 15 August event), with the mainshock occurring at 01:30 local time early on the morning of 16 August. The shaking lasted for one minute.

== Aftermath ==
The relief efforts were organised by Gabriel García Moreno, who had been appointed to that role by the federal government.

On 26 April each year, in the 'El Retorno' festival, Ibarra celebrates the return of the inhabitants in 1872 after a four-year absence following the earthquake.

== See also ==
- List of earthquakes in Colombia
- List of earthquakes in Ecuador
- List of historical earthquakes
