= 2016 Ecuador earthquake =

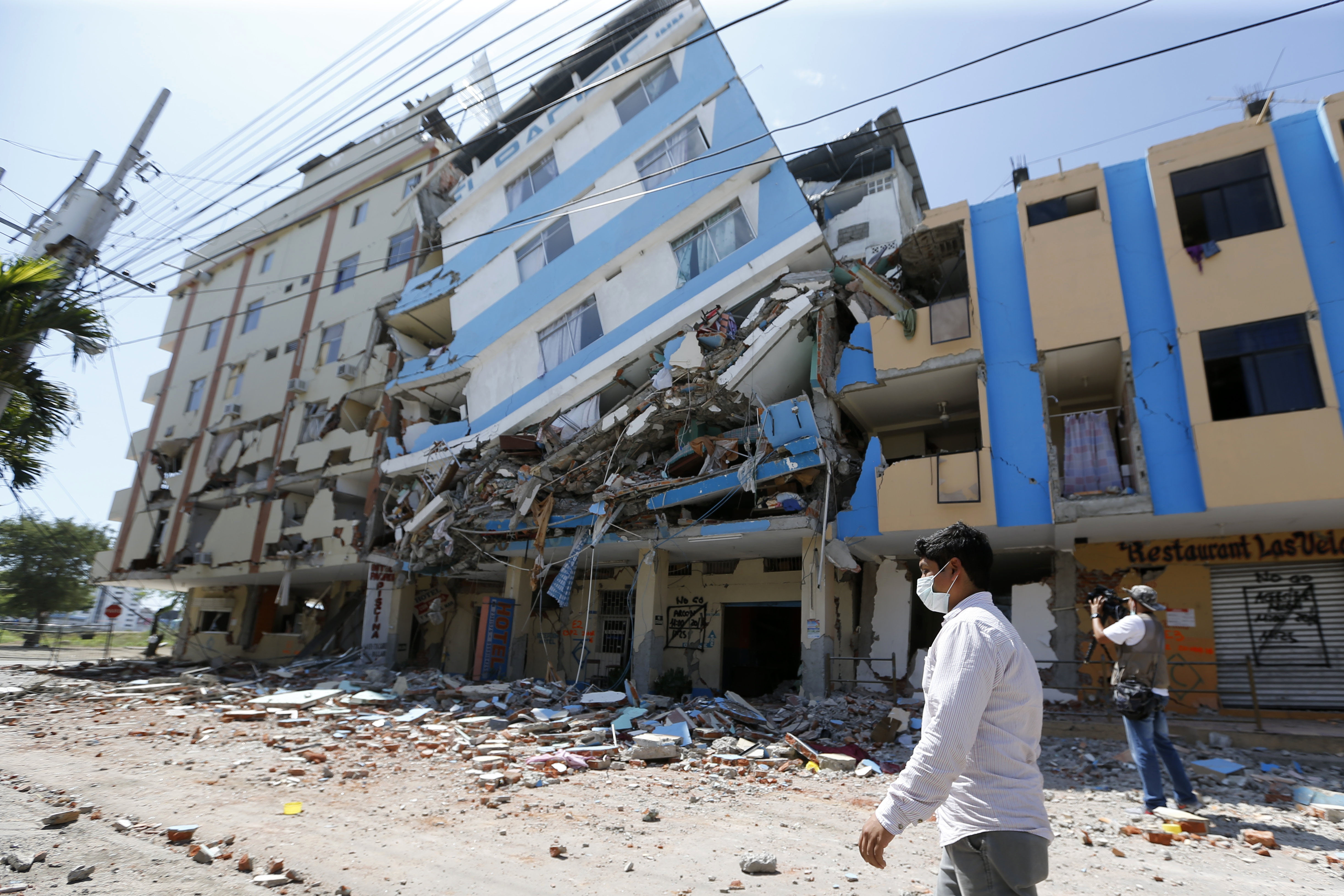
- Severe damage caused by the earthquake.

- Location within Ecuador
- UTC time: 2016-04-16 23:58:37
- ISC event: 608556966
- USGS-ANSS: ComCat
- Local date: April 16, 2016
- Local time: 18:58:37 ECT (UTC-5)
- Magnitude: 7.8 M_{w}
- Depth: 20.6 km (12.8 mi)
- Epicenter: 0.371°N 79.940°W
- Type: Thrust
- Areas affected: Ecuador, Colombia, Peru
- Max. intensity: MMI VIII (Severe)
- Tsunami: 1.11 m (3.6 ft)
- Foreshocks: 4.8 M_{w}
- Aftershocks: 1,034 as of 07:50 ECT (12:50 UTC) April 28
- Casualties: 676 killed, 8 missing, 27,732 injured

The 2016 Ecuador earthquake occurred on April 16 at 18:58:37 ECT with a moment magnitude of 7.8 and a maximum Mercalli intensity of VIII (Severe). The very large thrust earthquake was centered approximately 27 km (17 mi) from the towns of Muisne and Pedernales in a sparsely populated part of the country, and 170 km (110 mi) from the capital Quito, where it was felt strongly. The regions of Manta, Pedernales and Portoviejo accounted for over 75 percent of total casualties. Manta's central commercial shopping district, Tarqui, was completely destroyed. There was widespread damage across Manabí Province, and structures hundreds of kilometres from the epicenter collapsed. At least 676 people were killed and 27,732 people injured. President Rafael Correa declared a state of emergency; 13,500 military personnel and police officers were dispatched for recovery operations.

== Geology ==
Ecuador lies above the destructive plate boundary where the Nazca plate is subducting beneath the South American plate. The convergence rate between the plates in Ecuador is 61 mm (2.4 in) per year. The depth, location and focal mechanism of the earthquake are all consistent with rupture along the plate interface in the form of a megathrust earthquake. A major earthquake in 1906 ruptured the plate interface for at least 400 km (250 mi) immediately northeast of the 2016 event.

Finite fault model released by USGS for this event shows a 140 by 145 km (87 by 90 mi) rupture area. A paper from Geophysical Research Letters found a particular zone of high slip inside a 80 by 60 km (50 by 37 mi) patch of the broken subduction interface located at depths of between 15 and 44 km (9.3 and 27.3 mi). The rupture failed to propagate towards the trench; ceasing about 60 km (37 mi) away. A maximum slip of 2.5 m (8 ft 2 in) was estimated while the average slip across the rupture was 0.7 m (2 ft 4 in).

The earthquake ruptured a part of the plate boundary that had previously ruptured in another magnitude 7.8 quake in 1942. The similar aftershock distribution and rupture characteristics suggest the 2016 event was a repeat of the earthquake in 1942. The 1942 earthquake marked the beginning of a supercycle of earthquakes re-rupturing the entire boundary previously broken during the large 1906 event. The last earthquake in the supercycle occurred in 1979. Another earthquake in 1958 also formed part of the supercycle.

== Earthquake ==
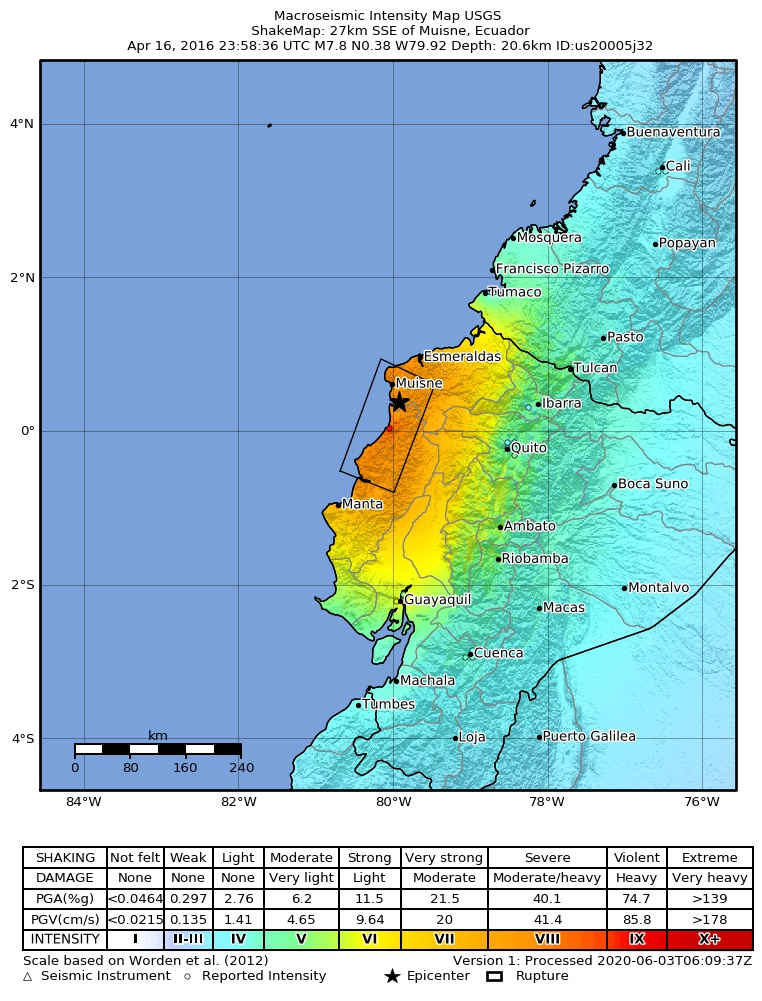
USGS shakemap for the event

At 18:58 ECT on April 16, a 7.8 M_{w} earthquake struck the coast of Ecuador approximately 27 km (17 mi) south-southeast of Muisne, in the province of Esmeraldas, at a depth of 20.6 km (12.8 mi). Tremors were felt in neighboring Colombia and Peru; a clinic in Cali, Colombia, was evacuated as a precautionary measure. A tsunami alert was issued by the Pacific Tsunami Warning Center for Colombia, Costa Rica, Ecuador, Fiji, Panama, and Peru. This is the largest earthquake to strike Ecuador since the 1979 Tumaco earthquake. According to Mayor Gabriel Alcivar, much of the town of Pedernales, about 35 km to the south-southwest of the earthquake's epicenter, was leveled. In Guayaquil—approximately 300 km (190 mi) from the epicenter—an overpass collapsed on a car, killing the driver. In Manta the control tower of the airport was severely damaged; an Air Force officer was injured and the airport closed. Six homes collapsed and many others lost power in the nation's capital city of Quito.

The earthquake was presaged by a magnitude 4.8 foreshock eleven minutes before the main quake struck, and followed by over fifty-five aftershocks in the first twenty-four hours.

== Casualties ==
Deaths by citizenship
Citizenship	Deaths
Ecuador	651
Colombia	11
Canada	4
Cuba	3
Dominican Republic	1
Italy	1
Ireland	1
United States	1
Total	676

At least 676 people were killed and more than 16,600 others were injured in the earthquake. It was the worst natural disaster to hit Ecuador since the 1949 Ambato earthquake. Over 300 fatalities occurred in the cities of Manta and Portoviejo, both of which are located in Manabí Province. President Rafael Correa stated that the reconstruction would cost "billions of dollars."

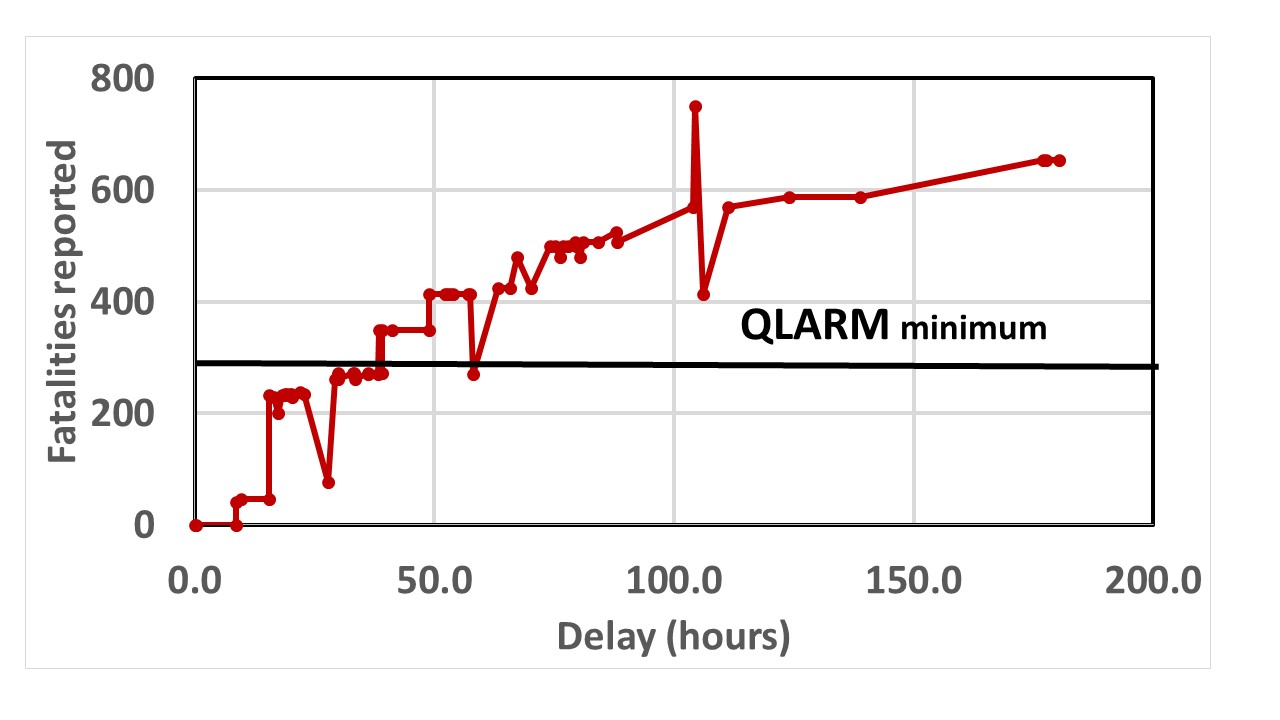
Fatalities table

The number of fatalities was estimated as several hundred within thirty minutes of the earthquake. However, the media reported the number of fatalities as significantly lower than what actually happened and than what was estimated within thirty minutes as the figure of reported fatalities with time shows. The number of injuries reported by media also remained below the ultimate count and below the correct estimate within 30 minutes by QLARM as seen in the next figure.

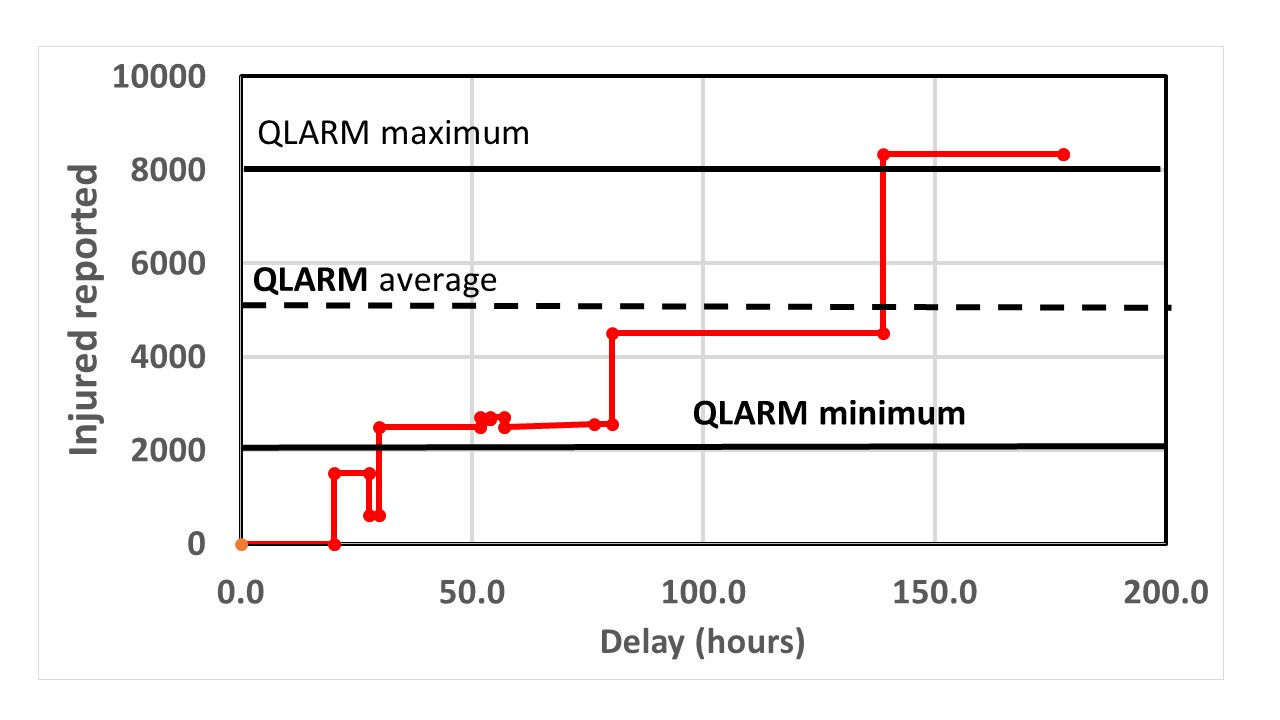
Injures table

By April 24, the fatality count had reached 654, and 8,340 had been reported as injured. Estimates of fatalities are based on calculations of the damage to the built environment using the program QLARM. Within minutes of an earthquake only its epicenter is known, not the extent of its rupture. The USGS shake map for this event shown on this page depicts the extent of the rupture area as a rectangle. With the length of the rupture as outlined by the aftershocks, a map of the likely mean damage by the settlement can be calculated. This map takes into account what intensities have been reported to the USGS for this earthquake. The numbers of fatalities and injured calculated theoretically, based on the damage map shown here, agrees well with the reported numbers.

The extent of the rupture can sometimes be known from aftershocks during the few hours following the main shock. In that case, maps of the intensity of shaking expected in each settlement may be calculated as in the figure below at the left for the 2016 Ecuador earthquake. Based on this ground motion, the mean damage expected in each settlement is then calculated. These maps allow first responders to target heavily damaged area.

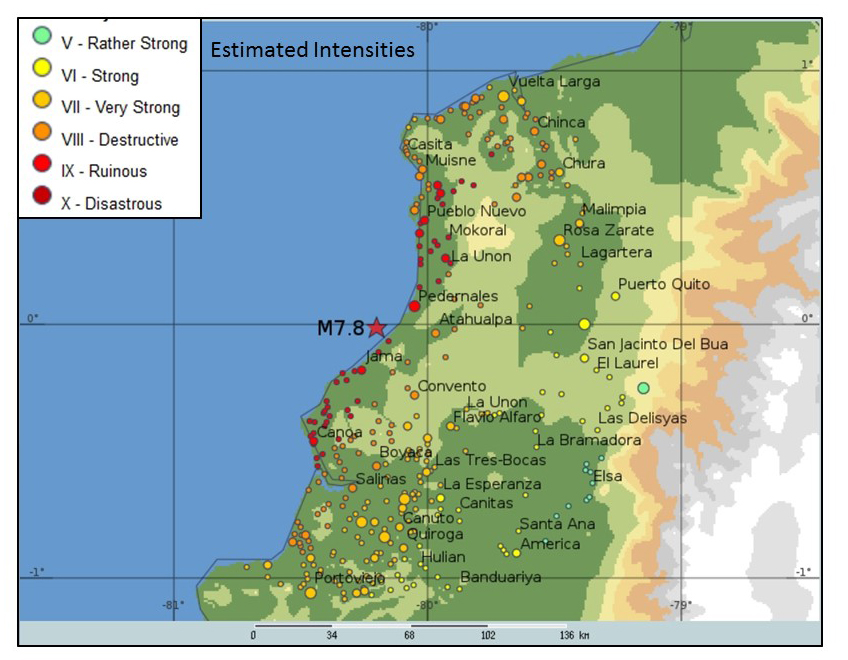
Map of Ecuador zone

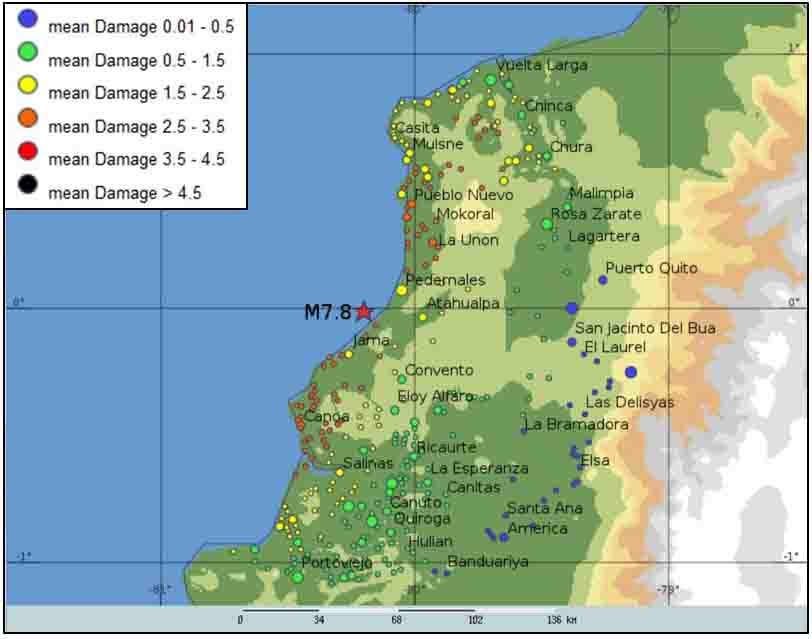
Map of Ecuador zone

Large cities tend to have buildings more resistant to shaking than villages, therefore the damage is less for city dwellers than for villagers, on average.

In Colombia, near the city of Cali, one miner died as a result of the earthquake, becoming the only reported death outside of Ecuador.

== Aftermath ==
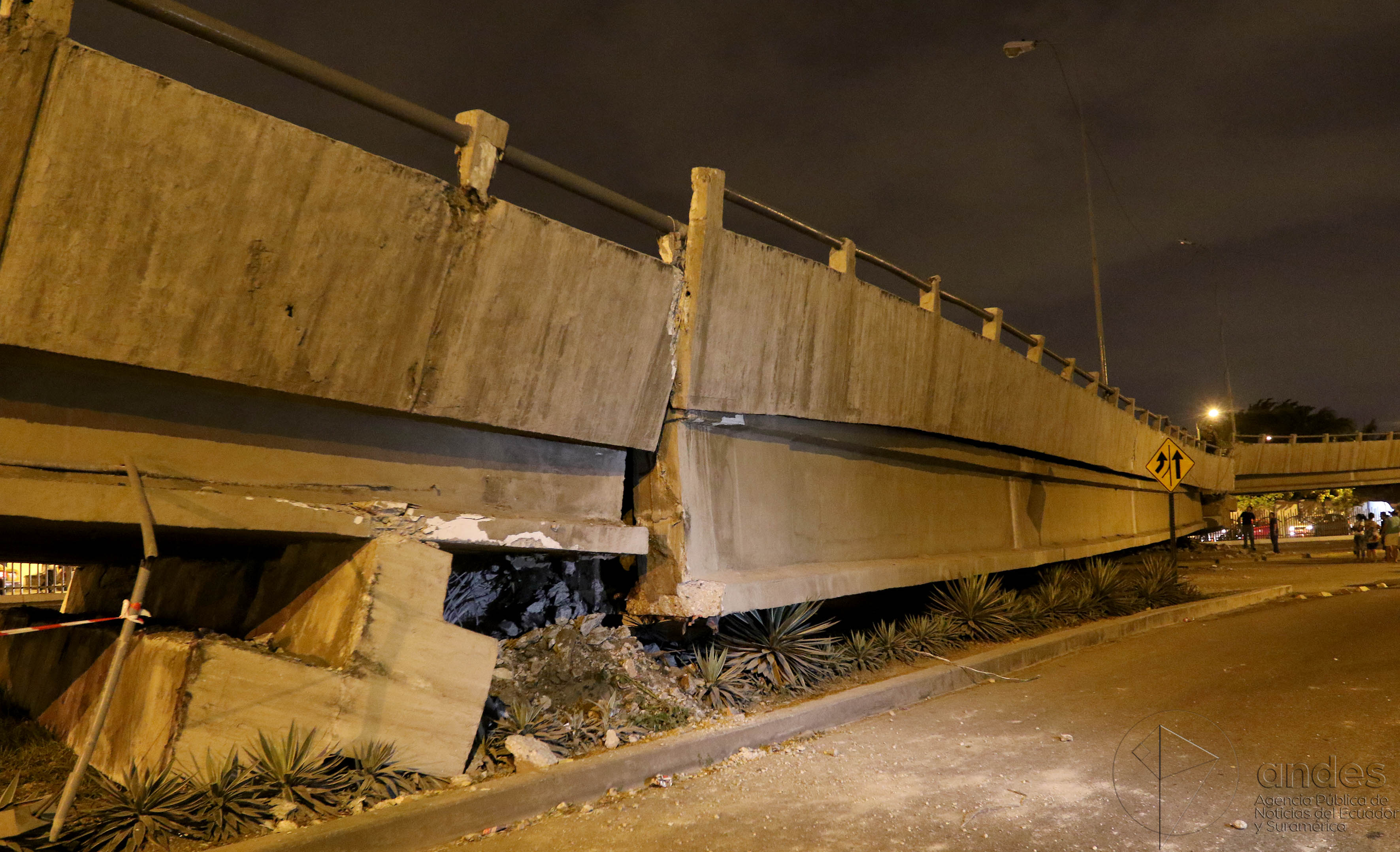
The collapsed overpass in Guayaquil

In response to the earthquake, a state of emergency was declared throughout the country and the national guard was mobilized to assist in rescue and relief efforts. Approximately 10,000 military personnel and 3,500 police officers were deployed. President Rafael Correa cut his trip to Italy short in order to return to Ecuador. Hydroelectric dams and oil pipelines were shut down as a precautionary measure.

On April 17 the International Charter on Space and Major Disasters was activated by UNITAR/UNOSAT on behalf of UN OCHA, thus providing for the charitable and humanitarian re-tasking of satellite assets.

On April 20, a 6.1–6.2 magnitude aftershock struck 15 miles west of Muisne around 3:30 am, local time. The quake had a depth of about 9 miles. José Joaquín de Olmedo International Airport in Guayaquil was also closed due to communication issues.

A UNICEF representative reported that the government is considering relocating "one or two" towns in the aftermath of the earthquake. There were also concerns about the Zika virus outbreak and the risk of dengue fever for people displaced by the quake.

Days after the earthquake, the country experienced difficulties distributing food and water to those in need, including the over 26 thousand survivors relocated to shelters. President Correa acknowledged that the poor infrastructure of the country might be to blame. The President estimated the damage at $3 billion, and has obtained credit from the World Bank, Inter-American Development Bank, and other sources, anticipated to reach a total of $2 billion; national sales tax has been raised as have income taxes on Ecuadorians.

On 30 June 2025, former vice president Jorge Glas was sentenced to 13 years' imprisonment for embezzling public funds related to recovery efforts following the earthquake.

== See also ==
- List of earthquakes in 2016
- List of earthquakes in Ecuador
