= List of earthquakes in 1942 =

Earthquakes in 1942
Approximate epicenters of the earthquakes in 1942
- 4.0–5.9 magnitude
- 6.0–6.9 magnitude
- 7.0–7.9 magnitude
- 8.0+ magnitude
- Strongest magnitude: Peru, Ayacucho Region, (Magnitude 8.1) August 24
- Deadliest: Turkey, Samsun Province, (Magnitude 7.0) December 20 1,000 deaths
- Total fatalities: 1,489

Number by magnitude
- 9.0+: 0

This is a list of earthquakes in 1942. Only magnitude 6.0 or greater earthquakes appear on the list. Lower magnitude events are included if they have caused death, injury or damage. Events which occurred in remote areas will be excluded from the list as they wouldn't have generated significant media interest. All dates are listed according to UTC time. This year saw an average number of magnitude 7.0+ events. The dominant event this year in terms of deaths was in December in Turkey with 1,000 of the 1,489 deaths for the year. Other deadly events occurred elsewhere in Turkey. Ecuador, China and Albania had earthquakes causing dozens of deaths. An unusually large quake struck the Southwest Indian Ridge in November with a magnitude of 8.0. Spreading ridges usually have smaller magnitude events.

== Overall ==
=== By death toll ===
Rank	Death toll	Magnitude	Location	MMI	Depth (km)	Date
1	1,000	7.0	Turkey, Samsun Province	X (Extreme)	10.0	December 20
2	200	7.8	Ecuador, Manabí Province	IX (Violent)	20.0	May 14
3	90	6.3	China, Yunnan Province	VIII (Severe)	35.0	January 31
4	51	6.0	China, Inner Mongolia	VIII (Severe)	0.0	July 8
5	43	6.0	Albania, Dibër County	X (Extreme)	33.0	August 27
6	38	7.7	Guatemala, off the west coast of Guatemala	VII (Very strong)	35.0	August 6
7	30	8.1	Peru, Ayacucho Region	IX (Violent)	30.0	August 24
8	17	0.0	Turkey, Çorum Province	VIII (Severe)	0.0	November 21
9	16	6.1	Turkey, Balıkesir Province	VIII (Severe)	0.0	November 15

- Note: At least 10 casualties

=== By magnitude ===
Rank	Magnitude	Death toll	Location	MMI	Depth (km)	Date
1	8.1	30	Peru, Ayacucho Region	IX (Violent)	30.0	August 24
2	8.0	0	Southwest Indian Ridge	( )	10.0	November 10
3	7.8	200	Ecuador, Manabí Province	IX (Violent)	20.0	May 14
4	7.7	38	Guatemala, off the west coast of Guatemala	VII (Very strong)	35.0	August 6
5	7.5	0	Empire of Japan, south of Minahasa Peninsula, Dutch East Indies	( )	100.0	May 28
= 6	7.4	0	Empire of Japan, west of Mindoro, Philippines	VII (Very strong)	15.0	April 8
= 6	7.4	0	Soviet Union, Kuril Islands	( )	65.0	November 26
= 7	7.2	0	Empire of Japan, Papua (province), Dutch East Indies	VII (Very strong)	17.5	January 27
= 7	7.2	0	Empire of Japan, Mindanao, Philippines	VI (Strong)	35.0	October 20
= 7	7.2	0	central Mid-Atlantic Ridge	( )	10.0	November 28
8	7.1	0	New Hebrides	( )	110.0	January 29
= 9	7.0	0	United States, Northern Mariana Islands	( )	15.0	June 14
= 9	7.0	0	New Zealand Wellington Region, North Island	VII (Very strong)	15.0	June 24
= 9	7.0	0	Free France, southeast of the Loyalty Islands, New Caledonia	( )	130.0	September 14
= 9	7.0	1,000	Turkey, Samsun Province	X (Extreme)	10.0	December 20

- Note: At least 7.0 magnitude

== Notable events ==
=== January ===
January
- Strongest magnitude: 7.2 M_{w} Dutch East Indies
- Deadliest: 6.3 M_{w} China; 90 deaths
- Total fatalities: 90

Number by magnitude
- 8.0–8.9: 0
- 7.0–7.9: 2
- 6.0–6.9: 2

Date	Country and location	M_{w}	Depth (km)	MMI	Notes	Casualties	
Date	Country and location	M_{w}	Depth (km)	MMI	Notes	Dead	Injured
8	Peru, Amazonas Region	6.0	110.0				
27	Dutch East Indies, Papua (province)	7.2	17.5	VII			
29	New Hebrides	7.1	110.0				
31	China, Yunnan Province	6.3	35.0	VIII	90 people were killed and at least 1,001 were injured. Many homes collapsed.	90	1,001+

=== February ===
February
- Strongest magnitude: 6.9 M_{w} British Solomon Islands
- Total fatalities: 0

Number by magnitude
- 8.0–8.9: 0
- 7.0–7.9: 0
- 6.0–6.9: 2

Date	Country and location	M_{w}	Depth (km)	MMI	Notes	Casualties	
Date	Country and location	M_{w}	Depth (km)	MMI	Notes	Dead	Injured
16	British Solomon Islands, Santa Cruz Islands	6.9	135.0				
21	Japan, off the east coast of Honshu	6.5	35.0	V			

=== March ===
March
- Strongest magnitude: 6.9 M_{w} Japan
- Total fatalities: 0

Number by magnitude
- 8.0–8.9: 0
- 7.0–7.9: 0
- 6.0–6.9: 3

Date	Country and location	M_{w}	Depth (km)	MMI	Notes	Casualties	
Date	Country and location	M_{w}	Depth (km)	MMI	Notes	Dead	Injured
5	Japan, eastern Sea of Japan	6.9	240.0				
21	Japan, Ryukyu Islands	6.8	25.0				
22	Afghanistan, Badakhshan Province	6.0	210.0				

=== April ===
April
- Strongest magnitude: 7.4 M_{w} Philippines
- Total fatalities: 0

Number by magnitude
- 8.0–8.9: 0
- 7.0–7.9: 1
- 6.0–6.9: 2

Date	Country and location	M_{w}	Depth (km)	MMI	Notes	Casualties	
Date	Country and location	M_{w}	Depth (km)	MMI	Notes	Dead	Injured
8	Philippines, west of Mindoro	7.4	15.0	VII			
11	Guatemala, Quetzaltenango Department	6.5	140.0				
20	Japan, off the south coast of Honshu	6.5	350.0				

=== May ===
May
- Strongest magnitude: 7.8 M_{w} Ecuador
- Deadliest: 7.8 M_{w} Ecuador; 200 deaths
- Total fatalities: 200

Number by magnitude
- 8.0–8.9: 0
- 7.0–7.9: 2
- 6.0–6.9: 2
- 5.0–5.9: 1

Date	Country and location	M_{w}	Depth (km)	MMI	Notes	Casualties	
Date	Country and location	M_{w}	Depth (km)	MMI	Notes	Dead	Injured
6	Venezuela, Anzoátegui	6.0	35.0				
14	Ecuador, Manabí Province	7.8	20.0	IX	The 1942 Ecuador earthquake killed 200 people. Property damage costs were $2.5 million (1942 rate) and many homes were destroyed.	200	
22	Colombia, Cundinamarca Department	5.8	130.0		Some property damage was reported.		
24	Dutch East Indies, northern Sumatra	6.8	60.0				
28	Dutch East Indies, south of Minahasa Peninsula	7.5	100.0				

=== June ===
June
- Strongest magnitude: 7.0 M_{w} 2 events
- Total fatalities: 0

Number by magnitude
- 8.0–8.9: 0
- 7.0–7.9: 2
- 6.0–6.9: 6

Date	Country and location	M_{w}	Depth (km)	MMI	Notes	Casualties	
Date	Country and location	M_{w}	Depth (km)	MMI	Notes	Dead	Injured
10	Philippines, Mindanao	6.3	15.0	VII			
14	United States, Northern Mariana Islands	7.0	15.0				
15	New Zealand, Kermadec Islands	6.8	285.0				
18	(Japan) Federated States of Micronesia	6.8	15.0				
20	Mexico, Michoacán	6.8	100.0				
21	Greece, Dodecanese	6.2	130.0				
24	New Zealand, Wellington Region, North Island	7.0	15.0	VII	1942 Wairarapa earthquakes.		
29	Chile, Valparaíso Region	6.9	95.0				

=== July ===
July
- Strongest magnitude: 6.8 M_{w} 2 events
- Deadliest: 6.0 M_{w} Republic of China (1912-1949); 51+ deaths
- Total fatalities: 51+

Number by magnitude
- 8.0–8.9: 0
- 7.0–7.9: 0
- 6.0–6.9: 5

Date	Country and location	M_{w}	Depth (km)	MMI	Notes	Casualties	
Date	Country and location	M_{w}	Depth (km)	MMI	Notes	Dead	Injured
7	Fiji	6.8	430.0				
8	Chile, Antofagasta Region	6.8	35.0	VII			
8	Republic of China (1912-1949), Inner Mongolia	6.0	0.0	VIII	At least 51 people were killed, another 51 were injured and some homes were destroyed.	51+	51+
25	Empire of Japan, off the west coast of Samar, Philippines	6.4	55.0	VI			
29	Empire of Japan, Ceram Sea, Dutch East Indies	6.7	35.0	VI			

=== August ===
August
- Strongest magnitude: 8.1 M_{w} Peru
- Deadliest: 6.0 M_{w} Albanian Kingdom (1939-43); 43 deaths
- Total fatalities: 111

Number by magnitude
- 8.0–8.9: 1
- 7.0–7.9: 1
- 6.0–6.9: 4

Date	Country and location	M_{w}	Depth (km)	MMI	Notes	Casualties	
Date	Country and location	M_{w}	Depth (km)	MMI	Notes	Dead	Injured
1	New Zealand, Wellington Region, North Island	6.8	35.0	VI	1942 Wairarapa earthquakes.		
6	Guatemala, off the west coast of	7.7	35.0	VII	38 people were killed and major damage was caused due to the 1942 Guatemala earthquake.	38	
8	Guatemala, Suchitepéquez Department	6.5	35.0				
24	Peru, Ayacucho Region	8.1	30.0	IX	The 1942 Peru earthquake caused the deaths of 30 people. 25 more were injured and many homes collapsed.	30	25
27	Albanian Kingdom (1939-43), Dibër County	6.0	33.0	X	43 people were killed and 110 injuries were reported. Many homes were destroyed.	43	110
29	Fiji, south of	6.8	570.0				

=== September ===
September
- Strongest magnitude: 7.0 M_{w} Free France
- Total fatalities: 0

Number by magnitude
- 8.0–8.9: 0
- 7.0–7.9: 1
- 6.0–6.9: 2

Date	Country and location	M_{w}	Depth (km)	MMI	Notes	Casualties	
Date	Country and location	M_{w}	Depth (km)	MMI	Notes	Dead	Injured
9	United States, Fox Islands (Alaska)	6.9	80.0				
14	Free France, southeast of the Loyalty Islands, New Caledonia	7.0	130.0				
24	Empire of Japan, off the east coast of Taiwan	6.3	10.0	VI			

=== October ===
October
- Strongest magnitude: 7.2 M_{w} Empire of Japan
- Total fatalities: 0

Number by magnitude
- 8.0–8.9: 0
- 7.0–7.9: 1
- 6.0–6.9: 4

Date	Country and location	M_{w}	Depth (km)	MMI	Notes	Casualties	
Date	Country and location	M_{w}	Depth (km)	MMI	Notes	Dead	Injured
9	Tanganyika, Ruvuma Region	6.8	60.0				
20	Empire of Japan, Mindanao, Philippines	7.2	35.0	VI			
21	United States, southern California	6.6	6.0	VIII	Some damage was reported.		
26	Soviet Union, Kuril Islands, Russia	6.6	35.0				
28	Mexico, off the coast of Oaxaca	6.2	35.0				

=== November ===
November
- Strongest magnitude: 8.0 M_{w} Southwest Indian Ridge
- Deadliest: 0.0 M_{w} Turkey; 17 deaths
- Total fatalities: 33

Number by magnitude
- 8.0–8.9: 1
- 7.0–7.9: 2
- 6.0–6.9: 6

Date	Country and location	M_{w}	Depth (km)	MMI	Notes	Casualties	
Date	Country and location	M_{w}	Depth (km)	MMI	Notes	Dead	Injured
6	Peru, San Martin Region	6.8	130.0				
7	Empire of Japan, Flores, Dutch East Indies	6.8	80.0				
10	Southwest Indian Ridge	8.0	10.0		This was one of the largest events to strike an ocean spreading ridge.		
12	Mexico, Oaxaca	6.1	60.0	VI	Some damage was caused.		
15	Turkey, Balıkesir Province	6.1	0.0	VIII	16 people were killed and some damage was caused. Unknown depth.	16	
15	Empire of Japan, off the east coast of Honshu	6.7	15.0	V			
21	Turkey, Çorum Province	0.0	0.0	VIII	17 people were killed and some damage was caused. Unknown depth and magnitude.	17	
26	Soviet Union, Kuril Islands, Russia	7.4	65.0				
28	central Mid-Atlantic Ridge	7.2	10.0				
30	Argentina, Santiago del Estero Province	6.5	590.0				

=== December ===
December
- Strongest magnitude: 7.0 M_{w} Turkey
- Deadliest: 7.0 M_{w} Turkey; 1,000 deaths
- Total fatalities: 1,004

Number by magnitude
- 8.0–8.9: 0
- 7.0–7.9: 1
- 6.0–6.9: 5

Date	Country and location	M_{w}	Depth (km)	MMI	Notes	Casualties	
Date	Country and location	M_{w}	Depth (km)	MMI	Notes	Dead	Injured
2	Turkey, Çorum Province	0.0	0.0	VIII	4 people were killed and major damage was caused. Magnitude and depth unknown.	4	
5	United States, Cook Inlet, Alaska	6.5	100.0				
11	Turkey, Amasya Province	0.0	0.0	VIII	Major damage was reported. Magnitude and depth unknown.		
19	Empire of Japan, Izu Islands, Japan	6.7	20.0				
20	Turkey, Samsun Province	7.0	10.0	VII	The 1942 Niksar–Erbaa earthquake caused around 1,000 deaths. Major damage was caused.	1,000	
22	Tonga	6.8	15.0				
26	Colombia, Córdoba Department	6.5	35.0				
29	Independent State of Croatia, Split-Dalmatia County	6.0	15.0	X			
