= Pedernales Canton =

- Canton
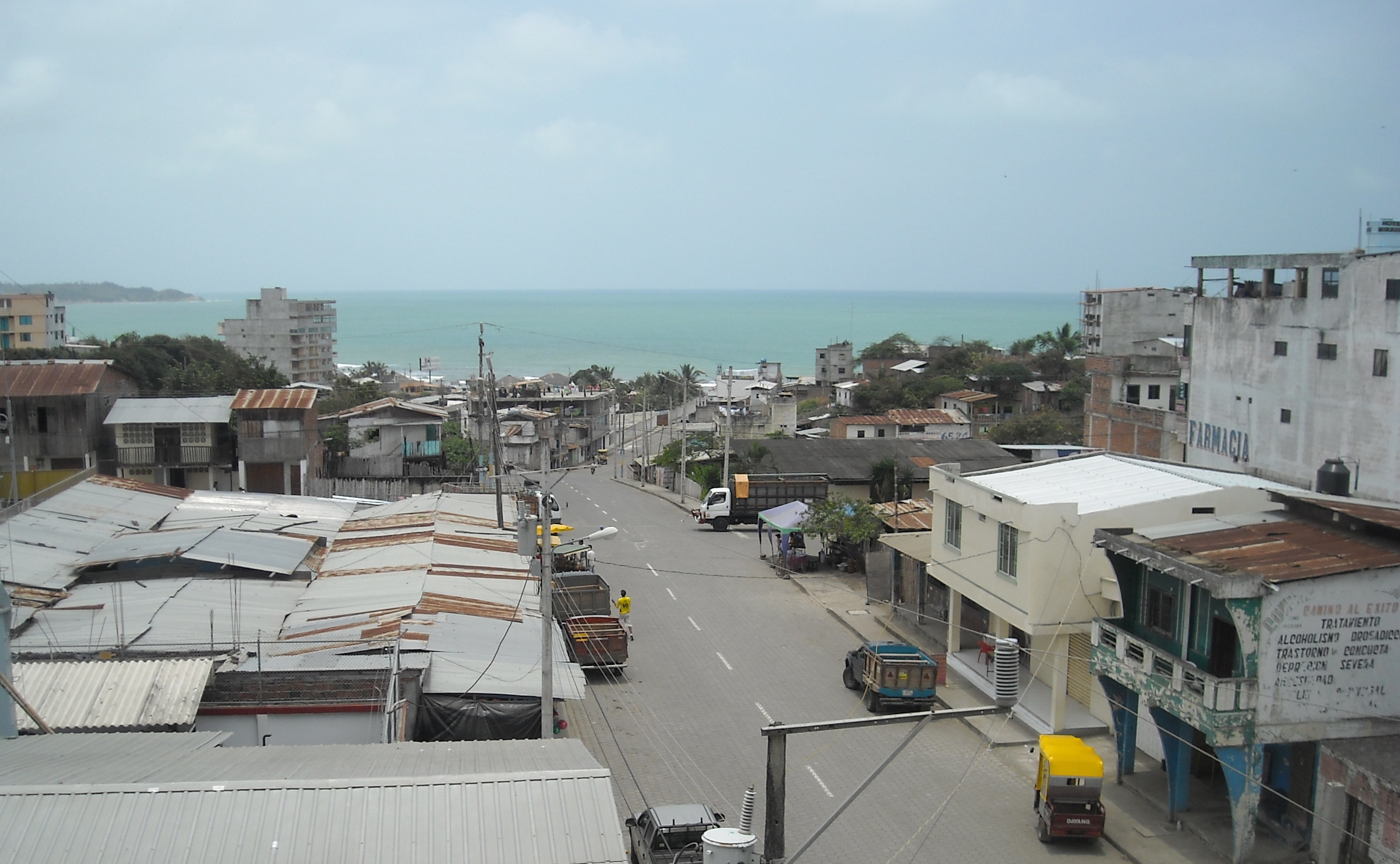
- Pedernales

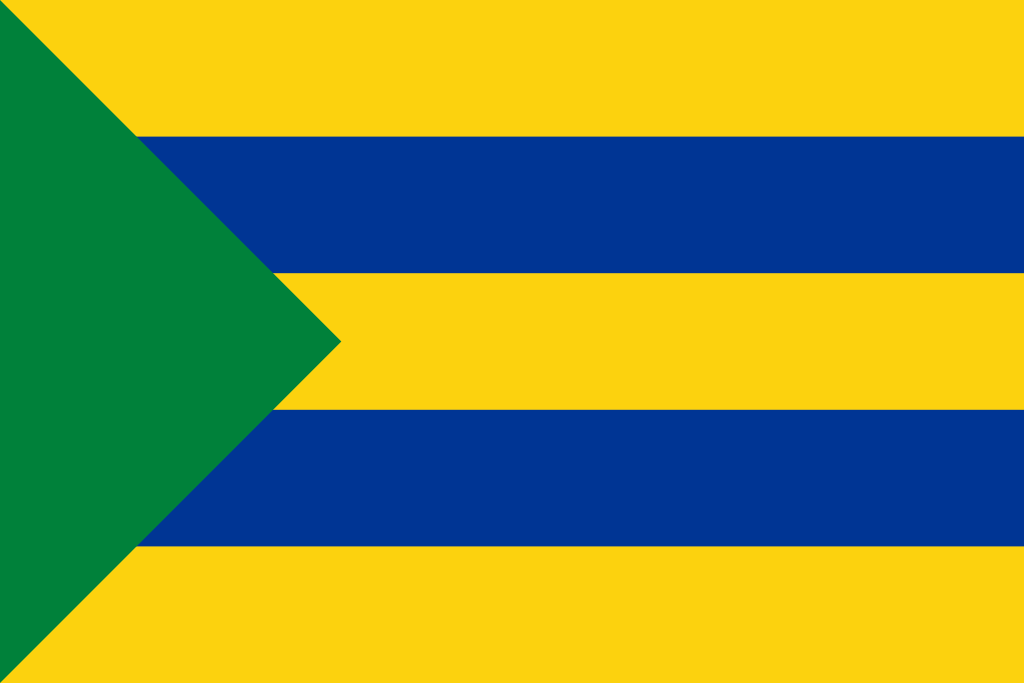
- Flag

- Location of Manabí Province in Ecuador.

- Pedernales Canton in Manabí Province
- Coordinates: 0.0701°N 80.0536°W
- Country: Ecuador
- Province: Manabí Province
- Capital: Pedernales

Area
  - Total: 1,971 km^{2} (761 sq mi)

Population (2022 census)
  - Total: 70,408
  - Density: 35.72/km^{2} (92.52/sq mi)
- Time zone: UTC-5 (ECT)

Pedernales Canton is a canton of Ecuador, located in the Manabí Province. Its capital is the town of Pedernales. Its population at the 2001 census was 46,876.

== Demographics ==
Ethnic groups as of the Ecuadorian census of 2010:

- White 82.0%
- Afro-Ecuadorian 7.9%
- Montubio 5.9%
- Mestizo 3.6%
- Indigenous 0.3%
- Other 0.2%
