= 2014 Ecuador earthquake =

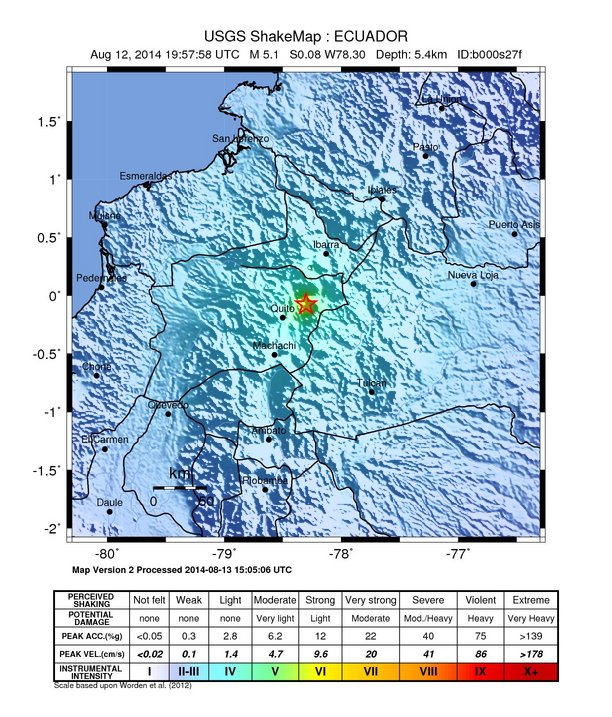
- Map about the severity of the earthquake 2014 near Quito and a table informing about the general severity of earthquakes and their colouring on the map. 2014 Ecuador earthquake (Ecuador)
- UTC time: 2014-08-12 19:58:00
- ISC event: 605145530
- USGS-ANSS: ComCat
- Local date: August 12, 2014
- Local time: 14:58
- Magnitude: 5.1 M_{w}
- Depth: 11.9 km (7.4 mi)
- Epicenter: 0.02°N 78.32°W
- Areas affected: Ecuador
- Max. intensity: MMI VI (Strong)
- Casualties: 4

On August 12, 2014, a magnitude 5.1 earthquake struck the South American country of Ecuador 23 km (14 mi) northeast of the capital, Quito, at a depth of 7.7 km (4.8 mi). The earthquake shook the city and surrounding areas, causing large dust clouds and prompting the temporary shutdown of the international airport. The earthquake killed at least 4 people including two men who were buried by a landslide in a local quarry. It also injured at least 8 others. Earthquakes are commonplace in Ecuador because of its position along the "Ring of Fire", an area of high seismic activity that encircles the Pacific Ocean.

== See also ==
- List of earthquakes in 2014
- List of earthquakes in Ecuador
- Ring of Fire
