= 1942 Niksar–Erbaa earthquake =

Earthquake in Turkey

- Location within Turkey
- UTC time: 1942-12-20 14:03:09
- ISC event: 900592
- USGS-ANSS: ComCat
- Local date: 20 December 1942
- Local time: 16:03
- Magnitude: 7.0 M_{s}
- Depth: 10 km (6.2 mi)
- Epicenter: 40.87°N 36.47°E
- Areas affected: Turkey
- Max. intensity: MMI IX (Violent)
- Casualties: 3,000

The 1942 Niksar–Erbaa earthquake in Turkey occurred at 16:03 local time on 20 December. It had an estimated surface-wave magnitude of 7.0 and a maximum felt intensity of IX (Violent) on the Mercalli intensity scale, causing 3,000 casualties.

== See also ==
- List of earthquakes in 1942
- List of earthquakes in Turkey
