= 1979 Tumaco earthquake =

Earthquake near Colombia and Peru

- Location within Colombia
- UTC time: 1979-12-12 07:59:05
- ISC event: 654039
- USGS-ANSS: ComCat
- Local date: December 12, 1979
- Local time: 02:59:05 COT
- Magnitude: 8.2 M_{w}
- Depth: 33 km (21 mi)
- Epicenter: 1.598°N 79.358°W
- Type: Megathrust
- Areas affected: Colombia, Ecuador
- Total damage: $8 million
- Max. intensity: MMI IX (Violent)
- Tsunami: 6 m (20 ft)
- Casualties: 300–600

An earthquake occurred at 02:59 local time on 12 December 1979, with the epicenter just offshore from the border between Ecuador and Colombia, near the port city of Tumaco. With a moment magnitude of 8.2 and a maximum Mercalli intensity of IX (Violent), it triggered a major tsunami, which was responsible for most of the estimated 300–600 deaths. The hardest hit area was Colombia's Nariño Department.

== Tectonic setting ==
Coastal parts of Ecuador and southern Colombia lie above the convergent boundary where the Malpelo plate subducts beneath the South American plate along the Colombia–Ecuador Trench. At this location the Malpelo plate, the microplate northeast of the Nazca plate, is moving to the east relative to South America at a rate of 58 mm per year. North of the Carnegie Ridge, the subduction interface has four recognisable segments, from south to north, the Esmeraldas, Manglares, Tumaco and Patia segments. This plate boundary has been the location of several great historical earthquakes, most associated with damaging tsunamis. In 1906, a 5–600 km long segment of the plate interface ruptured, causing a M 8.8 earthquake (rupturing all four segments) and a trans-Pacific tsunami.

== Earthquake ==
This event was the last of three earthquakes that ruptured adjacent parts of the plate interface, forming a northeastward migrating sequence. The 1942 earthquake ruptured the Esmeraldas segment, the 1958 earthquake ruptured the Manglares segment and the 1979 event ruptured the Tumaco and Patia segments. Together they ruptured the same part of the megathrust as the 1906 earthquake. The rupture area of the 1979 earthquake measured 280 km long by 130 km wide.

The earthquake was widely felt in both Ecuador (including Guayaquil, Esmeraldas and Quito) and Colombia (including Bogotá, Cali, Popayán and Buenaventura). The coast in the epicentral region subsided by up to 1.6 m during the earthquake and the land movement locally disrupted river drainage.

== Tsunami ==
The coast nearest the epicenter was hit by the first wave of the tsunami about three minutes after the earthquake. Three to four waves were observed, with the third being the highest. The third wave coincided with low tide, greatly reducing the extent of the inundation and the likely death toll. The maximum observed water height was 6.0 m at San Juan de la Costa, northeast of Tumaco. The tsunami was observed on the east coast of Japan, in Hawaii, Tahiti and Mexico.

== Damage ==
The earthquake caused widespread damage, particularly in Tumaco, where about a tenth of all buildings were destroyed, including 1,280 houses, and 25 people were reported either dead or missing. The fishing village of Charco was almost completely destroyed by the tsunami, the waves washing the houses inland into a nearby lake. 93 of the original population of 4,000 were reported either dead or missing. The tsunami also destroyed all the houses in San Juan de la Costa, with 199 reported either dead or missing. The total death toll was estimated to be 500–600 with another 4,000 injured.

== Aftermath ==
The damage caused by this earthquake and the 1983 Popayán earthquake, near central Colombia, led to the development of a national building code for earthquake-resistant structures for Colombia, which came into law in 1984.

== See also ==
- List of earthquakes in 1979
- List of earthquakes in Colombia
- List of earthquakes in Ecuador
