= Balao =

City in Ecuador

- Town
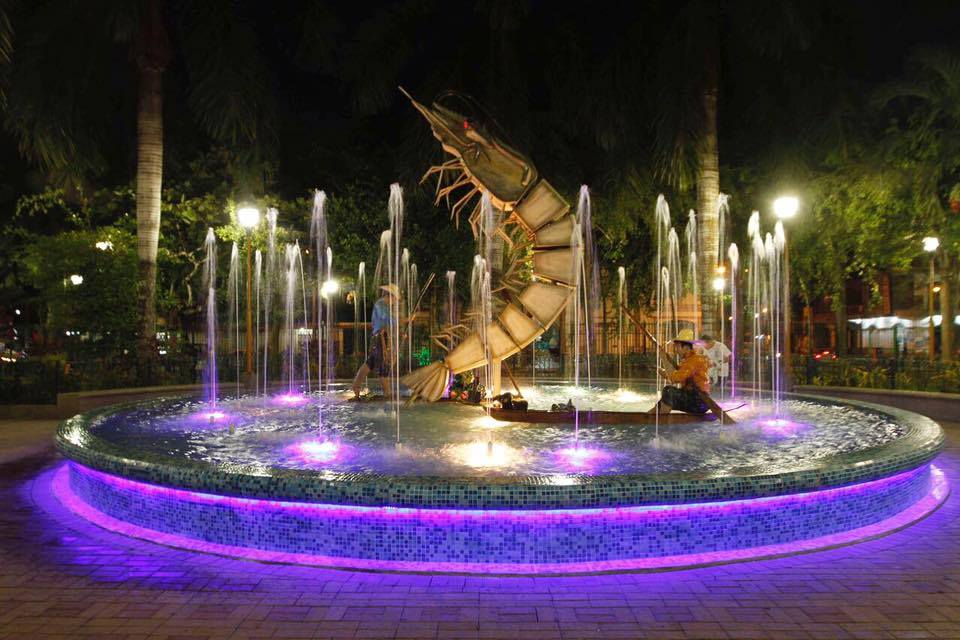
- Central park of Balao

- Flag
- Motto: Por la Gloria y el Progreso de Balao (For the Glory and Progress of Balao)
- Location within Ecuador
- Coordinates: 2.91047°S 79.81672°W
- Country: Ecuador
- Provinces: Guayas
- Canton: Balao
- Founded: before 1700

Government
  - Mayor: Sandy Gómez

Area
  - Town: 1.34 km^{2} (0.52 sq mi)
- Elevation: 10 m (33 ft)

Population (2022 census)
  - Town: 12,850
  - Density: 9,590/km^{2} (24,800/sq mi)
- Demonym: Balaoense
- Time zone: UTC-5 (ECT)
- Website: http://www.municipiodebalao.gob.ec/

Balao is a town located in southern Guayas, Ecuador, near Azuay and El Oro provinces. It is the seat of Balao Canton, created in 1987.

As of the census of 2022, Balao Canton had a population of 25,655. The town is connected with Guayaquil and Machala. It has an airstrip.

The town and the canton may take their name from a tree. An alternate theory for the name Balao comes from a tribe called Palau, who allegedly inhabited the area in pre-hispanic times. The most important rivers are: the Balao River, the Jagua River, and the Gala River. The main crops are: banana, cacao, rice, maize, cassava, tomato, coffee, and tropical fruits.

== History ==
Balao historically was a population settlement surrounded by farms, the native inhabitants or migrants from surrounding areas, lived from agriculture and fishing. Balao appears as a town since the 1700s, according to very old residents, and its first inhabitants lived from agriculture and fishing. Until the year 1831, when Mr. Corregidor of Guayas Province sent an inspector to take note of what Balao produced and marketed because the residents had requested him to be promoted to Parish and according to the Guayaquil archives, on 19 On March 1832 they give Balao the rank of parish of the Guayaquil canton, then in 1986 his sons fought for Balao to become part of a new canton of the Guayas Province, and so every November 17 the cantonization of Balao is celebrated, which was created with Law number 75 and published in the Official Gazette No. 812 of November 17, 1987, where its limits are clearly indicated by the Special Commission of Internal Limits of the Republic (CELIR), and from that date the first Cantonal Council was elected. Its first mayor was Dr. Lisímaco Martillo Landívar.

The town served as the northernmost limit of the Ecuadorian Demilitarized Zone from its establishment in October 1941 to its dissolution in February 1942.

== Climate ==
Climate data for Balao (Tenguel), elevation 20 m (66 ft), (1961–1990)
| Month | Jan | Feb | Mar | Apr | May | Jun | Jul | Aug | Sep | Oct | Nov | Dec | Year |
|---|---|---|---|---|---|---|---|---|---|---|---|---|---|
| Mean daily maximum °C (°F) | 31.2 (88.2) | 30.8 (87.4) | 31.2 (88.2) | 31.5 (88.7) | 30.7 (87.3) | 29.2 (84.6) | 29.5 (85.1) | 28.3 (82.9) | 27.7 (81.9) | 27.7 (81.9) | 28.3 (82.9) | 29.8 (85.6) | 29.7 (85.4) |
| Daily mean °C (°F) | 25.7 (78.3) | 26.0 (78.8) | 26.2 (79.2) | 26.7 (80.1) | 25.8 (78.4) | 24.7 (76.5) | 24.7 (76.5) | 24.2 (75.6) | 23.8 (74.8) | 23.7 (74.7) | 24.2 (75.6) | 25.0 (77.0) | 25.1 (77.1) |
| Mean daily minimum °C (°F) | 21.2 (70.2) | 20.8 (69.4) | 21.3 (70.3) | 21.6 (70.9) | 21.3 (70.3) | 21.1 (70.0) | 21.1 (70.0) | 21.1 (70.0) | 20.0 (68.0) | 20.2 (68.4) | 20.2 (68.4) | 20.3 (68.5) | 20.8 (69.5) |
| Average precipitation mm (inches) | 132.0 (5.20) | 135.0 (5.31) | 123.0 (4.84) | 100.0 (3.94) | 53.0 (2.09) | 29.0 (1.14) | 18.0 (0.71) | 25.0 (0.98) | 40.0 (1.57) | 57.0 (2.24) | 34.0 (1.34) | 31.0 (1.22) | 777 (30.58) |
Source: FAO

== See also ==
- Ecuadorian–Peruvian War
