= 1906 Ecuador–Colombia earthquake =

Offshore earthquake west of Ecuador and Colombia in January 1906

- USGS ShakeMap

- UTC time: 1906-01-31 15:36:10
- ISC event: 16957884
- USGS-ANSS: ComCat
- Local date: January 31, 1906
- Local time: 10:36:10
- Magnitude: 8.8 M_{w}
- Depth: 20 km (12 mi)
- Epicenter: 0.955°N 79.369°W
- Type: Megathrust
- Areas affected: Ecuador, Colombia
- Max. intensity: MMI IX (Violent)
- Tsunami: 5 m (16 ft)
- Casualties: ~1,000

The 1906 Ecuador–Colombia earthquake occurred at 10:36:10 (UTC+5) on Wednesday, January 31, 1906, off the coast of Ecuador, near Esmeraldas. The earthquake had a moment magnitude of 8.8 and triggered a destructive tsunami that caused at least 500 casualties on the coast of Colombia.

== Tectonic setting ==
The 1906 earthquake occurred along the tectonic boundary between the Malpelo plate—previously regarded as the northeastern segment of the Nazca plate—and the North Andes plate. It is believed that the event was the result of thrust faulting associated with the subduction of the Coiba, Malpelo, and Nazca plates beneath the North Andes and South American plates. This region, particularly the coastal areas of Ecuador and Colombia, has a documented history of significant megathrust earthquakes originating from the Malpelo–North Andes plate boundary.

== Damage ==
The most severe damage resulting from the tsunami occurred along the coastal region between Río Verde in Ecuador and Micay in Colombia. Estimates of the number of fatalities attributed to the tsunami vary, ranging from approximately 500 to as many as 1,500.

== Characteristics ==
=== Earthquake ===
The rupture zone associated with the 1906 earthquake extended approximately 500 to 600 kilometers and encompassed the rupture areas of three subsequent significant earthquakes: the 1942, 1958, and 1979 events. The absence of overlap among these later ruptures suggests the existence of minor structural or mechanical barriers to rupture propagation along the plate boundary. While these three events collectively ruptured a similar portion of the boundary, they released only a small fraction of the seismic energy discharged during the 1906 event.

=== Tsunami ===
The tsunami generated by the 1906 earthquake produced a maximum recorded run-up height of 5 meters in Tumaco, Colombia. In Hilo, Hawaii, the run-up height reached 1.8 meters. The tsunami's effects were also observed in several distant locations, including Costa Rica, Panama, Mexico, California, and Japan.

== Future seismic hazard ==
Given that the sequence of three earthquakes concluding in 1979 released significantly less energy than the 1906 event, researchers initially proposed the likelihood of another earthquake of comparable magnitude occurring in the near future. However, subsequent analyses of the slip associated with the 1942, 1958, and 1979 events indicate that these earthquakes collectively released the majority of the tectonic displacement that had accumulated along the plate boundary since 1906. On April 16, 2016, a magnitude 7.8 earthquake occurred within the same region.

== See also ==
- List of earthquakes in 1906
- List of earthquakes in Colombia
- List of earthquakes in Ecuador
