= 1998 Bahía de Caráquez earthquake =

Earthquake in Ecuador

- Location within Ecuador
- UTC time: 1998-08-04 18:59:20
- ISC event: 1174716
- USGS-ANSS: ComCat
- Local date: August 4, 1998
- Local time: 13:59:20 ECT
- Magnitude: M_{w} 7.2
- Depth: 33 km (21 mi)
- Epicenter: 0.593°S 80.393°W
- Max. intensity: MMI X (Extreme)
- Casualties: 3 dead

The 1998 Bahía de Caráquez earthquake occurred on August 4 at 13:59 local time (18:59 UTC) with a magnitude M_{w} 7.2. The epicenter was located at 10 km north of Bahía de Caráquez, about 190 km NNW of Guayaquil, and about 215 km W of Quito, Ecuador. In Bahía de Caráquez, electricity, telephone, and water services disrupted, and many buildings were damaged. It was felt strongly in Guayaquil and Quito and could be felt in much of Ecuador and in Cali, Colombia. An M_{w} 5.4 foreshock occurred 1 hour and 24 minutes before the main shock and hence alerted many people. The Nazca plate is subducting beneath the South American plate near the Ecuadorian coast. This earthquake was a shallow thrust earthquake in this subduction zone.

Since March 1997, Wawa Pichincha, 12 km to the west of Quito, began a period of unrest. Since May 1998, a seismic swarm occurred at Wawa Pichincha. Three days after the Bahía de Caráquez earthquake, on August 7, 1998, a moderate phreatic eruption occurred in Wawa Pichincha. Wawa Pichincha remained active in 1999, and in 2000 its activities became more moderate.

== See also ==
- List of earthquakes in Ecuador
