= Geology of Ecuador =

The geology of Ecuador includes ancient Precambrian basement rock and a complex tectonic assembly of new sections of crust from formerly separate landmasses, often uplifted as the Andes or transformed into basins.

== Geologic history, stratigraphy and tectonics ==
Much of Ecuador is underlain by Precambrian igneous and metamorphic crystalline basement rocks. The Piedras Group rocks date to the period and outcrop in El Oro Province on the western Andean slope in the southwest of the country and includes greenschist and amphibolite with small intercalations of quartz-sericite schist and quartzite, dated to 743 million years ago in the Proterozoic. These high-grade, polymetamorphic rocks often show signs of overprinting and green hornblende with a feather-like texture is found in the amphibolite.

=== Mesozoic (251-66 million years ago) ===
Continental and oceanic terranes began to be added to western South America in the Mesozoic. In north-central Ecuador, the Peltetec-Portovelo fault marks the suture between the pre-existing South American craton and the Amotape-Chaucha terrane, which partially subducted beneath a preexisting Mesozoic continental arc system. The Triassic mafic and granitoid rocks of the El Oro metamorphic complex and the component eclogite, blueschist and amphibolite are known as the Raspas metamorphic complex. This section of the terrane was previously subducted but brought to the surface with tectonic activity.

The breakup of the supercontinent Gondwana is recorded in the Triassic in Ecuador with S-type granite plutons, followed by the intrusion of calc-alkaline batholiths in the Jurassic.

Oceanic basalts formed in the Jurassic and Cretaceous were accreted to the edge of the continent as a separate terrane around 130 million years ago, forming a belt of basalt and diabase, together with tuff, metasedimentary and sedimentary rocks running north–south into Ecuador.

=== Cenozoic (66 million years ago-present) ===
Following the accretion of new terranes to the Western Cordillera, the Cenozoic brought the extensive uplift of the Andean orogeny. Volcanic rocks vary geochemically between the Western Cordillera and Eastern Cordillera. In the east, they are predominantly rhyolite, andesite and andesitedacite while in the west, they are characteristically andesite and plagidacite. These are inferred to be the result of hydrous partial melting of Basic Igneous Complex garnet amphibolite and amphibolite.

=== Natural resource geology in Cenozoic rocks ===
Most mineable deposits in Ecuador are either epithermal gold or porphyry copper hosted in Paleogene rocks, formed from the Eocene to the Miocene. They may have originated from an enriched mid-ocean ridge (MORB) basalt. Compared to other neighboring countries, copper deposits are comparatively small. Explanations have included a lack of development of magma chambers around nine million years ago due to the extent of compression in the Ecuadorian section of the Andes, or perhaps of a lack of exposure of deposits near the surface.
