= Balao Canton =

- Canton
- Location of Guayas in Ecuador.

- Balao Canton in Guayas Province
- Coordinates: 2.91°S 79.81°W
- Country: Ecuador
- Province: Guayas Province
- Capital: Balao

Area
  - Total: 441.3 km^{2} (170.4 sq mi)

Population (2022 census)
  - Total: 25,655
  - Density: 58.14/km^{2} (150.6/sq mi)
- Time zone: UTC-5 (ECT)

Balao Canton is a canton of Ecuador, located in the Guayas Province. Its capital is the town of Balao. Its population at the 2010 census was 20,523.

== Demographics ==
Ethnic groups as of the Ecuadorian census of 2010:

- Mestizo 77.7%
- Afro-Ecuadorian 9.6%
- Montubio 6.3%
- White 5.4%
- Indigenous 0.6%
- Other 0.4%
