= 1987 Santiago de Chuco earthquake =

- Location within Peru
- UTC time: 1987-10-02 22:27:58
- ISC event: 454516
- USGS-ANSS: ComCat
- Local date: October 2, 1987
- Local time: 17:27:58 PET
- Magnitude: 5.6 M_{w}
- Depth: 29.9 km (18.6 mi)
- Epicenter: 8.25°S 77.96°W
- Type: Oblique-slip
- Areas affected: Peru
- Max. intensity: MMI VII (Very strong)
- Casualties: 3 dead

The 1987 Santiago de Chuco earthquake struck Peru on October 2 with a moment magnitude of 5.6 and a maximum Mercalli intensity of VII (Very strong). The shock killed three people and caused damage to homes in the titular province.
