= 1797 Riobamba earthquake =

Deadly earthquake in central Ecuador

- Local date: 4 February 1797
- Local time: 07:30
- Magnitude: 7.6 M_{w} 8.3 M_{L}
- Epicenter: 1.6°S 78.6°W
- Areas affected: Ecuador
- Max. intensity: MMI XI (Extreme)
- Casualties: 6,000–40,000

The 1797 Riobamba earthquake occurred at 12:30 UTC on 4 February. It devastated the city of Riobamba and many other cities in the Interandean valley, causing between 6,000 and 40,000 casualties. It is estimated that seismic intensities in the epicentral area reached at least XI (Extreme) on the Mercalli intensity scale, and that the earthquake had a magnitude of 7.6–8.3, the most powerful historical event known in Ecuador. The earthquake was studied by Prussian geographer Alexander von Humboldt, when he visited the area in 1801–1802.

== Tectonic setting ==
The active tectonics of Ecuador is dominated by the effects of the subduction of the Nazca plate beneath the South American plate. The main NNE-SSW trending fault systems show a mixture of dextral (right lateral) strike-slip faulting and reverse faulting. In addition to these faults that run parallel to the Andes in Ecuador, there are two important SW-NE trending-dextral-fault systems: the Pallatanga fault and the Chingual fault. The Pallatanga fault runs close to the epicenter and movement on this fault has been suggested as the cause of the earthquake, although there is no clear surface break supporting such recent movement.

== Damage ==
The area of significant damage (Intensity ≥VII) extended from Quito in the north to more than 60 km south of Riobamba, including the cities of Guaranda, Ambato, Latacunga and the towns of Saquisilí and Baños. Riobamba and the town of Quero were both destroyed by landslides. The Pastaza River was dammed for up to eighty days by landslides at the foot of the Tungurahua volcano.

Humboldt visited then region several years after the earthquake, and his analysis therefore largely relied on anecdotal accounts that he gathered. Some of the observations such as "the bodies of many of the inhabitants were found to have been hurled to Cullca, a hill several hundred feet in height and on the opposite side of the river Lican", are not credible. He gave a figure of thirty to forty thousand for the number of casualties, while some more recent estimates give figures ranging from six to twelve thousand.

== Characteristics ==
The shaking lasted for three to four minutes. The estimated rupture length for the earthquake is 70.3 km, with a fault azimuth of 067°. A moment magnitude of 7.6 was estimated based on data about the intensity distribution of the earthquake. An earthquake of this size would imply a rupture length of about 110 km, which can only be achieved along the Pallatanga Fault System.

== Aftermath ==
The city of Riobamba was rebuilt nearly 20 km northeast of its original site, now occupied by the small town of Cajabamba.

== See also ==
- List of earthquakes in Ecuador
- List of historical earthquakes
