= 1958 Ecuador–Colombia earthquake =

Earthquake in South America

- Location within Ecuador
- UTC time: 1958-01-19 14:07:28
- ISC event: 883713
- USGS-ANSS: ComCat
- Local date: January 19, 1958
- Local time: 9:07:28
- Magnitude: 7.6 M_{w}
- Depth: 27.5 km (17.1 mi)
- Epicenter: 1.5°N 79.5°W
- Areas affected: Ecuador, Colombia
- Max. intensity: MMI IX (Violent)
- Tsunami: Yes
- Casualties: 111 dead

The 1958 Ecuador–Colombia earthquake struck the coastal regions of Ecuador and Colombia on January 19 with a surface-wave magnitude of 7.6 at 9:07 local time. Approximately 30 percent of Esmeraldas (Ecuador) was destroyed, including the children's department of the hospital, where three children died. At least 111 persons died and 45 were injured as a result of the earthquake. Water mains were broken and power transmission lines were damaged. The Esmeraldas-Quito highway collapsed at many places. Many other roads of the country were made impassable by cracks and fallen trees. According to press reports, a landslide from the slopes of the Andes at Panado village buried a hundred people. The earthquake was destructive in the cities on the northern coast of the country and was strong from Latacunga to Quito, Ibarra and Tulcán. It was felt at Guayaquil.

== Tectonic setting ==
Ecuador and Colombia lie above a convergent boundary where the Nazca plate is being subducted beneath the South American plate. The convergence rate is 55 mm per year and the subduction is significantly oblique to the boundary. This part of the plate boundary has been the location of a series of large historical earthquakes, including the M_{w}=8.8 1906 Ecuador–Colombia earthquake, which ruptured 5–600 km of the plate interface. Since 1906 there have been three major earthquakes that together have re-ruptured this same segment, in 1942, 1958 and 1979.

== Damage ==
In Colombia, Tumaco suffered most of all. Several old residences and a wooden home for railway workers collapsed. The large brick ovens used for drying pulp collapsed at the sawmills. The brick wall of the new church cracked. The walls of a number of other buildings cracked. The rafters of the roof of the tide gauge box set up at the end of the breakwater (on Del Morro Island) came out of their grooves, the roof collapsed and carried the instrument and the box with it into the water. Pile wooden homes rocked so strongly in a north–south direction, that 8 cm gaps appeared in the ground at the foundations. The corrugated roof of the lower shed was bent in by the collision of two adjacent sheds. The embankments connecting Tumaco Island with adjacent islands crumbled and cracked. Bottles, vases, dishes, cameras, typewriters, etc. fell and broke. Water splashed out of tubs. The telegraph link between Tumaco and La Espriella was out of commission for 24 hours because of fallen posts. A resident of the city was injured. Eyewitnesses between Tumaco and Esmeraldas found it difficult to remain standing. Water gushed out of cracks in the ground on Manglares Cape, and trees fell.

The earthquake was strong at Pasto, Ipiales, Imuesa, Tuquerres and Sapuyas; it lasted about 40 minutes, but did not cause material damage. At Cali and Pereira, the population was frightened. At Bogotá, the pendulums stopped on the clocks at the seismic station.

Many recurrent shocks were felt at the epicentral zone; the two strongest occurred on January 19 at 9:45 and on February 1. According to geodesic data, the breakwater at Tumaco was shifted 1 cm along the vertical by the earthquake.

The earthquake gave rise to a tsunami. A launch almost sank at Esmeraldas; four customs officers died. The waves damaged Tumaco and Guayaquil.

== See also ==
- List of earthquakes in 1958
