= Pedernales, Ecuador =

Pedernales
- Town
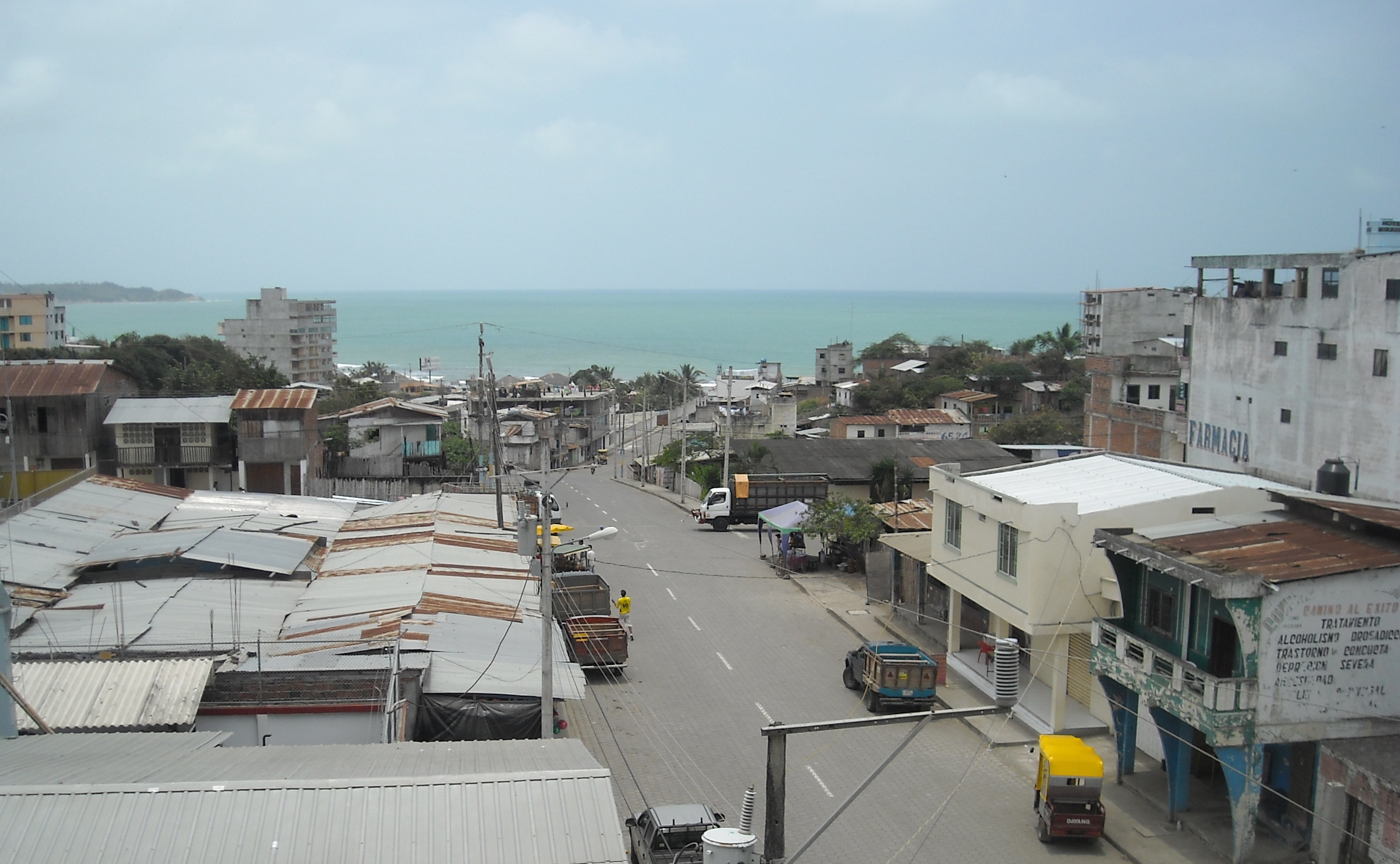
- A main street in Pedernales (2010)

- Location within Ecuador
- Coordinates: 00°04′12″N 80°03′18″W
- Country: Ecuador
- Province: Manabí
- Canton: Pedernales
- Parish: Pedernales

Area
  - Town: 5.66 km^{2} (2.19 sq mi)

Population (2022 census)
  - Town: 27,068
  - Density: 4,780/km^{2} (12,400/sq mi)
- Climate: Aw
- Website: pedernales.gob.ec

Pedernales is a coastal town in Ecuador. It is the capital of Pedernales Canton. Ecuador's Pacific Highway 15 passes through the town and Highway 382 terminates in the town.

Much of the town and nearby urban areas were leveled by a 7.8 M_{w} earthquake in April 2016.

As of March 2017, a large part of the town has been rebuilt.
