= 1987 Ecuador earthquakes =

Natural disaster in Ecuador

- Location within Ecuador
- UTC time: 1987-03-06 04:10:43
- ISC event: 471340
- USGS-ANSS: ComCat
- Local date: March 5, 1987
- Local time: 23:10:43 ECT
- Magnitude: 7.1 M_{w}
- Depth: 10 km (6.2 mi)
- Epicenter: 0.07°N 77.75°W
- Total damage: $1 billion
- Max. intensity: MMI IX (Violent)
- Foreshocks: 6.4 M_{w} March 6 at 01:54
- Aftershocks: 6.0 M_{w} March 6 at 08:14
- Casualties: 1,000–5,000 dead 20,000–150,000 displaced

The 1987 Ecuador earthquakes occurred over a six-hour period on March 6, 1987. The sequence of shocks measured 6.7, 7.1, and 6.0 on the moment magnitude scale. The main shock had a maximum Mercalli intensity of IX (Violent). The earthquakes were centered in Napo Province in northeast Ecuador; the epicenters were on the eastern slopes of the Andes, about 75 km ENE of Quito and 25 km north of Reventador Volcano. The earthquakes caused about 1,000 deaths. Four thousand people were missing and damage was estimated at US$1 billion.

== See also ==
- Mass wasting
