= Carnegie Ridge =

Ridge in the Pacific Ocean

Coordinates: 1.0°S 83.0°W

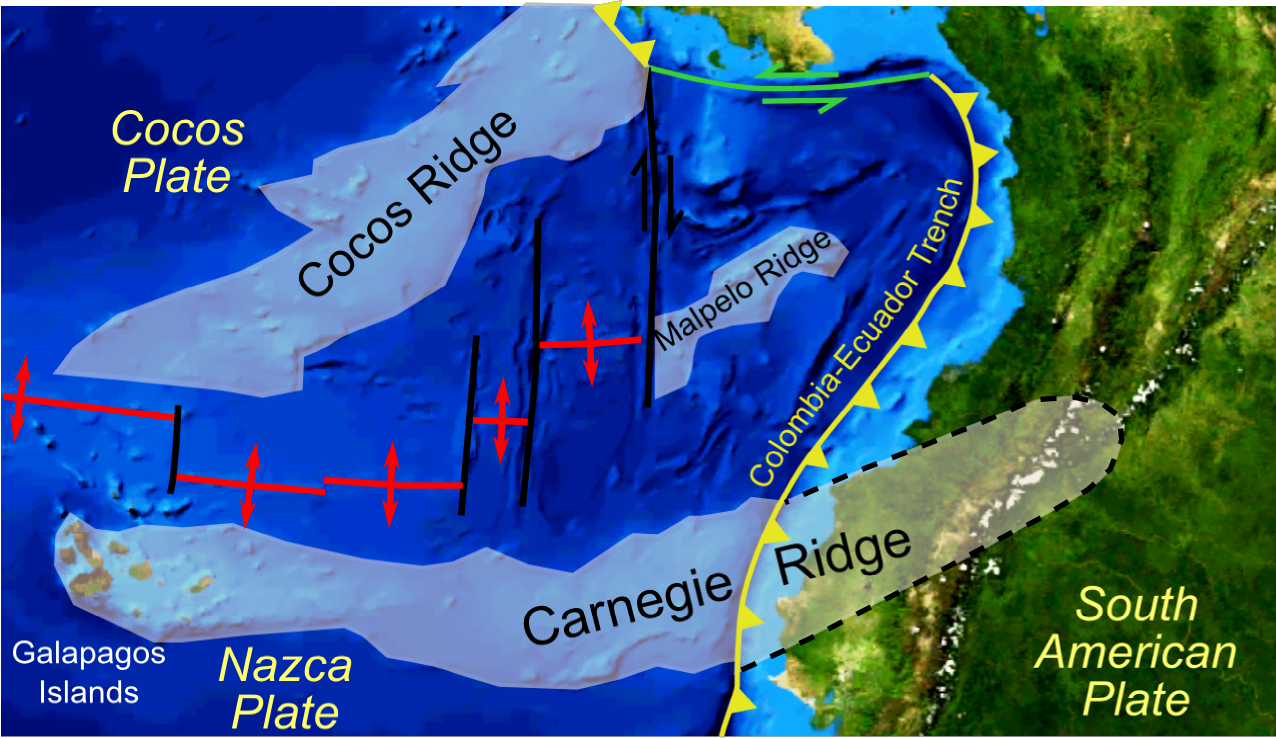
Outline of aseismic ridges and plate boundaries off northwestern South America, suggested continuation of Carnegie Ridge beneath Ecuador from Gutcher et al. 1999, other models suggest that this area is much smaller

The Carnegie Ridge is an aseismic ridge on the Nazca plate that is being subducted beneath the South American plate. The ridge is thought to be a result of the passage of the Nazca Plate over the Galápagos hotspot. It is named for the research vessel Carnegie, which discovered it in 1929.

== Extent ==
The Carnegie Ridge is seen to extend eastwards over 1,000 km from the Galapagos islands to the Colombia–Ecuador trench and is interpreted to continue beneath northern Ecuador for about a further 700 km. The subducted extent is disputed, with some workers arguing that there is no evidence of a subducted ridge beneath Ecuador extending more than about 60 km from the trench.

== Structure ==
The Carnegie Ridge consists of thickened oceanic crust. Wide-angle seismic reflection and refraction data acquired over the central and eastern part of the ridge give crustal thicknesses of 13 km and 19 km respectively for crust that has estimated ages of about 11 Ma and 20 Ma. Layer 2 thicknesses are similar to the neighbouring normal oceanic crust with thickening taking place in layer 3.

== History ==
The formation of the Carnegie Ridge and other aseismic ridges in this part of the Pacific started at about 20 Ma when the Galapagos hotspot formed, following the break-up of the Farallon plate and the formation of the separate Cocos and Nazca plates. At about 19.5 Ma, the Galápagos spreading center (GSC) moved so that most of the hotspot magmatism affected the Nazca Plate, forming the combined Carnegie and Malpelo Ridges. At about 14.5 Ma the spreading center jumped south, such that most of the magmatism affected the Cocos Plate and caused the Malpelo Ridge to rift away from the Carnegie Ridge. This stage caused the narrowing of the Carnegie Ridge now seen between 85° W and 87° W. At about 9.5 Ma rifting between the Malpelo and Carnegie Ridges ceased. The GSC moved north again at about 5 Ma, leaving the hotspot entirely within the Nazca Plate, which is the current situation.

== Subduction ==
The onset of subduction of the Carnegie Ridge beneath the South American Plate has been dated variously from about mid-Miocene (15 Ma) to about Pleistocene (2 Ma). Although there is agreement that the ridge is being subducted, there is little agreement on the effect that this has had on either the subducting or over-riding plates. Some models argue that the buoyancy associated with the thickened crust of the ridge has caused the downgoing Nazca Plate to tear, leaving a relatively flat section carrying the ridge, flanked by two sections with steeper dip. The presence of a flat section is not supported by a more recent study of earthquake hypocenters, which found a constant dip of about 25°–35° down to 200 km.
