= Reina de Mi Tierra 2011 =

- Date: October 27, 2011
- Venue: Guayaquil, Guayas, Ecuador

Reina de Mi Tierra 2011, the 4th competition, will be held in October 2011. Where Mireya Levi, from Tulcán will crown her successor as Reina de Mi Tierra 2011.

The winner of Reina de Mi Tierra will represent her province at Miss Ecuador 2012 directly without castings. Also, in the final night will have the Top 24 and then Top 6 and a Top 3.

== Contestants ==
As of September 24, 2011, 60 contestants have been confirmed.

Canton	Contestant	Age	Height (cm)	Height (ft)	Province
Baba	Melissa Bajaña	19	175	5'9"	Los Rios
Babahoyo	Nirvana Torres Berrus	16	171	5'7"	Los Rios
Balao	Crisell Thalía Mendoza Cavallos	19	168	5'6"	Guayas
Balzar	Joselyne Aguayo	19	172	5'8"	Guayas
Bucay	Yaritza Figueroa	16	167	5'6"	Guayas
Buena Fe	Nathaly Salinas Bravo	18	169	5'7"	Los Rios
Caluma	Kerly Lara Morejón	22	168	5'6"	Bolivar
Cayambe	Daniela Jaramillo	18	169	5'7"	Pichincha
Chone	Diana Zambrabo	18	175	5'6"	Manabi
Colimes	Belinda Claribel	16	167	5'6"	Guayas
Cumandá	Esther Naula	18	169	5'7"	Chimborazo
Daule	Karla López	16	167	5'6"	Guayas
El Carmen	María Belén Robalino	19	171	5'7"	Manabi
El Coca	Yomaira Cordero Castillo	19	168	5'6"	Orellana
El Empalme	Ginger DiCaso	21	171	5'7"	Guayas
El Guabo	Ana Mishel Ajila	21	176	5'9"	El Oro
El Triunfo	Joselyne Mera	18	176	5'9"	Guayas
Esmeraldas	Karen Morales Contreras	18	171	5'7"	Esmeraldas
La Maná	María Cristina Tixe Vera	18	170	5'7"	Cotopaxi
La Troncal	Marjorie Ortíz	18	173	5'8"	Cañar
Lomas de Sargentillo	Mónica Fajardo Sornaza	18	173	5'8"	Guayas
Macas	Karla Merino	18	173	5'8"	Morona-Santiago
Machala	Erika Pontón	18	176	5'9"	El Oro
Maldonado	Katherine Jiménez Flor	19	173	5'8"	Pichincha
Manta	Alejandra Proaño	18	174	5'8"	Manabi
Marcabelí	Angie Gabriel Maza	21	174	5'8"	El Oro
Milagro	Brigitte Joselyne Salazar Llerena	19	174	5'8"	Guayas
Mocache	Mariam Lua Vera	17	171	5'7"	Los Rios
Muisne	Patricia Samaniego	17	167	5'6"	Esmeraldas
Naranjal	Pamela Chica Mora	24	170	5'7"	Guayas
Naranjito	Esther Vallejo Rodas	17	166	5'5"	Guayas
Nobol	Martha Romero	17	168	5'6"	Guayas
Palenque	Karla Elena Vera Chóez	20	170	5'7"	Los Ríos
Palestina	Gloria Rendón	17	170	5'7"	Guayas
Patate	Edith Sarabia	20	168	5'6"	Tungurahua
Pedro Carbo	Amy Villacís García	19	173	5'8"	Guayas
Pelileo	María Soledad Llerena	24	173	5'8"	Tungurahua
Pillaro	Cristina Amores	18	170	5'7"	Tungurahua
Playas	Sofía Santillán Briones	17	174	5'8"	Guayas
Ponce Enríquez	Katherine Indio Zambrano	17	167	5'6"	Azuay
Puerto López	Brigette Espinar	16	167	5'6"	Manabí
Puyo	Olga Riofrío	22	168	5'6"	Pastaza
Quevedo	Yamel Zambrano	16	172	5'8"	Los Ríos
Quinindé	Nubia Flores	23	177	5'9"	Esmeraldas
Riobamba	Anjulye Villágomez	19	173	5'8"	Chimborazo
Salinas	María Fernanda Parra	18	173	5'8"	Santa Elena
Salitre	María José Guin	17	169	5'7"	Guayas
Samborondón	Lissette Sandoya	17	173	5'8"	Guayas
San Miguel	Jazmín Proaño	19	174	5'8"	Pichincha
Santa Ana	Yaritza Mieles	17	176	5'9"	Manabi
Santa Cruz	Jazmín Cargua	19	174	5'8"	Galápagos
Santa Elena	Yumi Zambrabo	19	171	5'7"	Santa Elena
Santa Lucía	Lissette Espinoza	17	170	5'7"	Guayas
Santo Domingo	Ruth Guevara	19	176	5'9"	Santo Domingo
Saraguro	Jenny Cabrera	18	175	5'8"	Loja
Tena	Jennifer Proaño	18	178	5'10"	Napo
Urdaneta	Kimberly Espinoza	23	178	5'10"	Los Ríos
Ventanas	Genessis Rendon	19	169	5'6"	Los Rios
Vinces	María José Moscoso	22	172	5'7"	Los Ríos
Yaguachi	Dennisse Cali Moreno	16	167	5'6"	Guayas
