= List of cities in Ecuador =

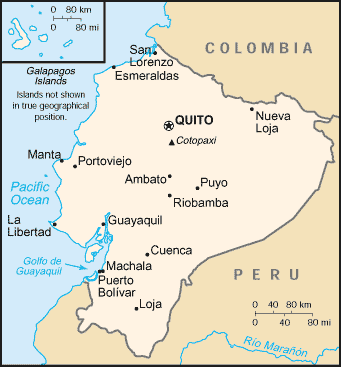
Map of Ecuador

This is a list of cities in Ecuador.

== List ==
=== By population ===
Capitals of the provinces are shown in bold face.

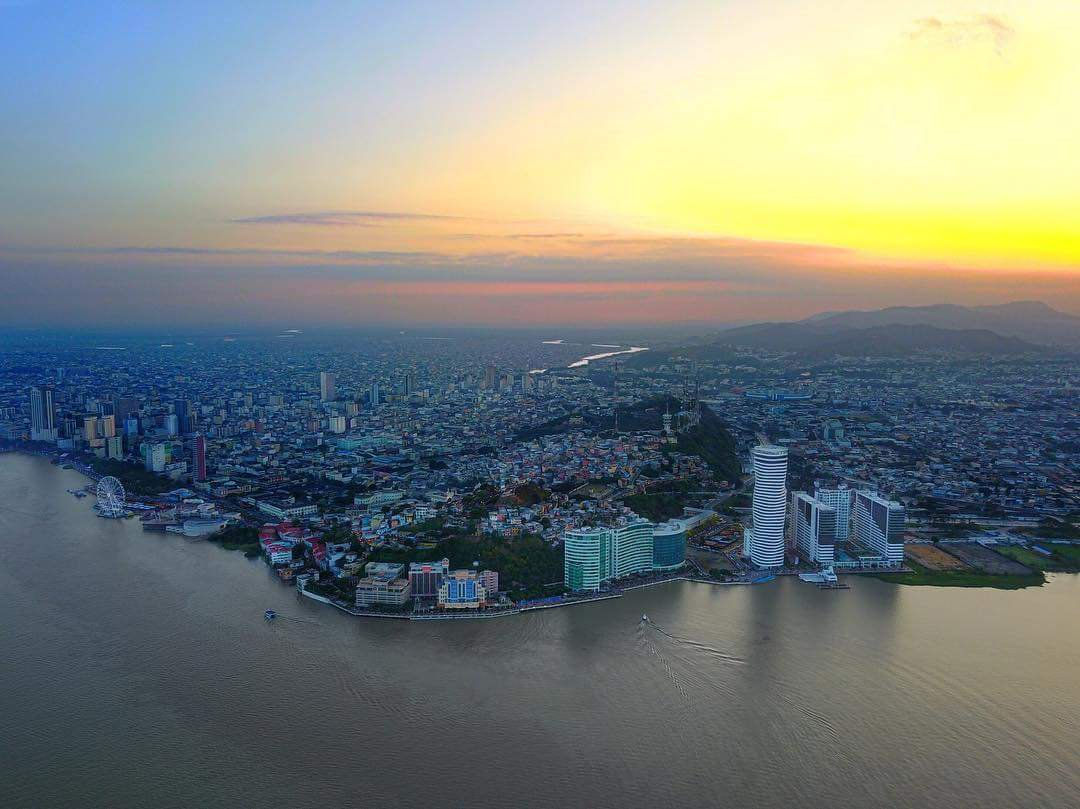
1. Guayaquil

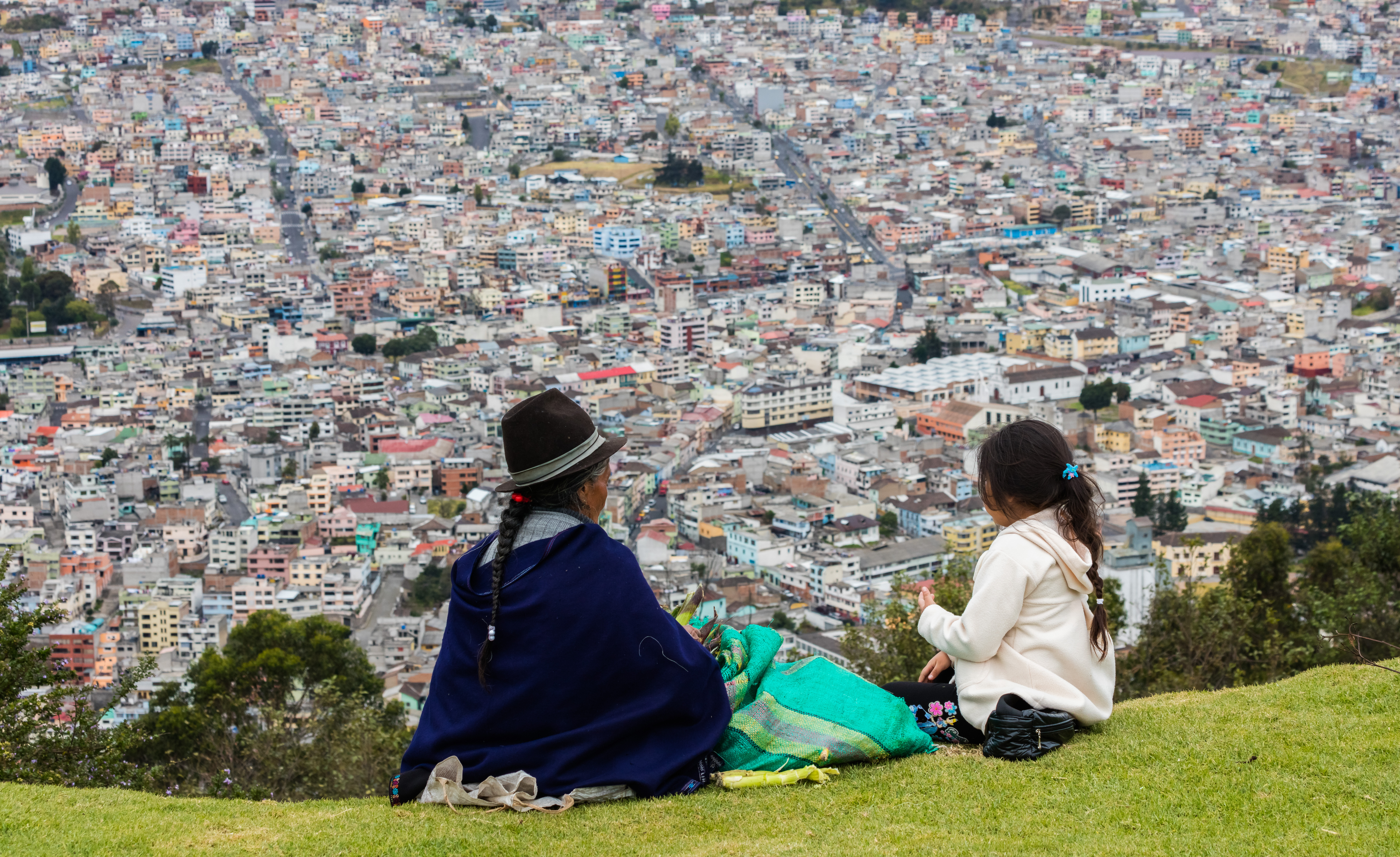
2. Quito

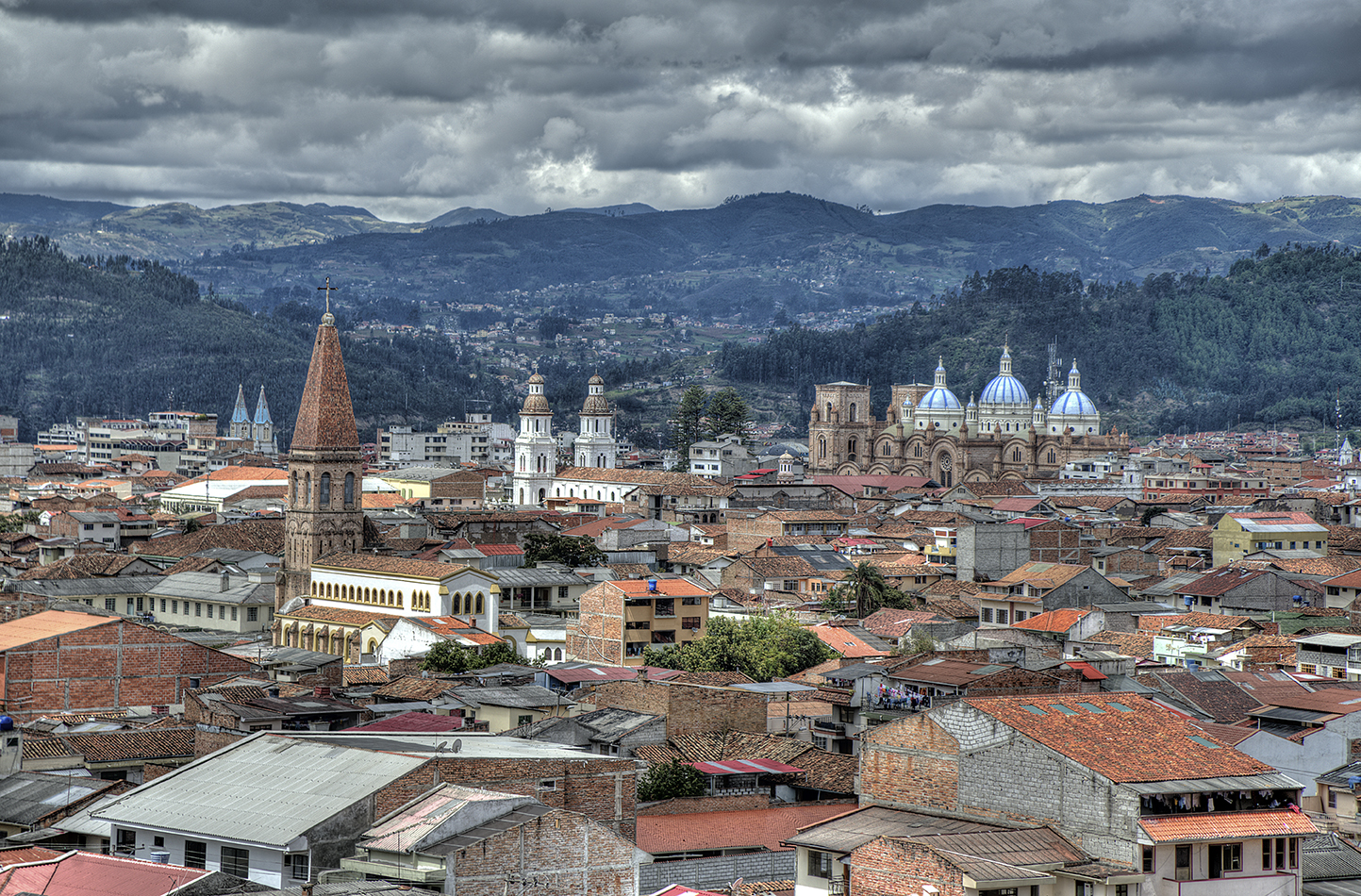
3. Cuenca

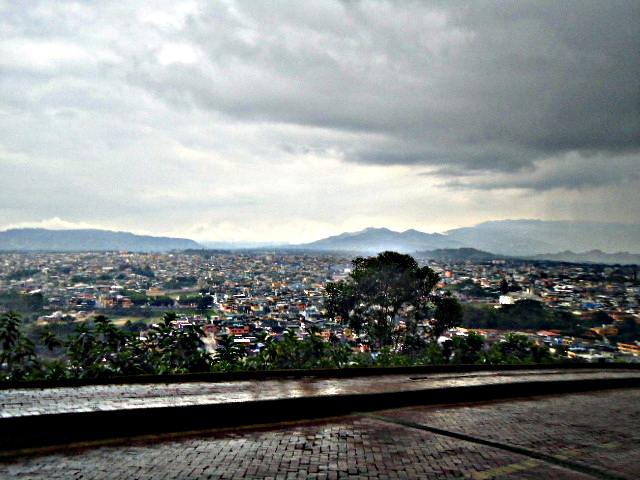
4. Santo Domingo

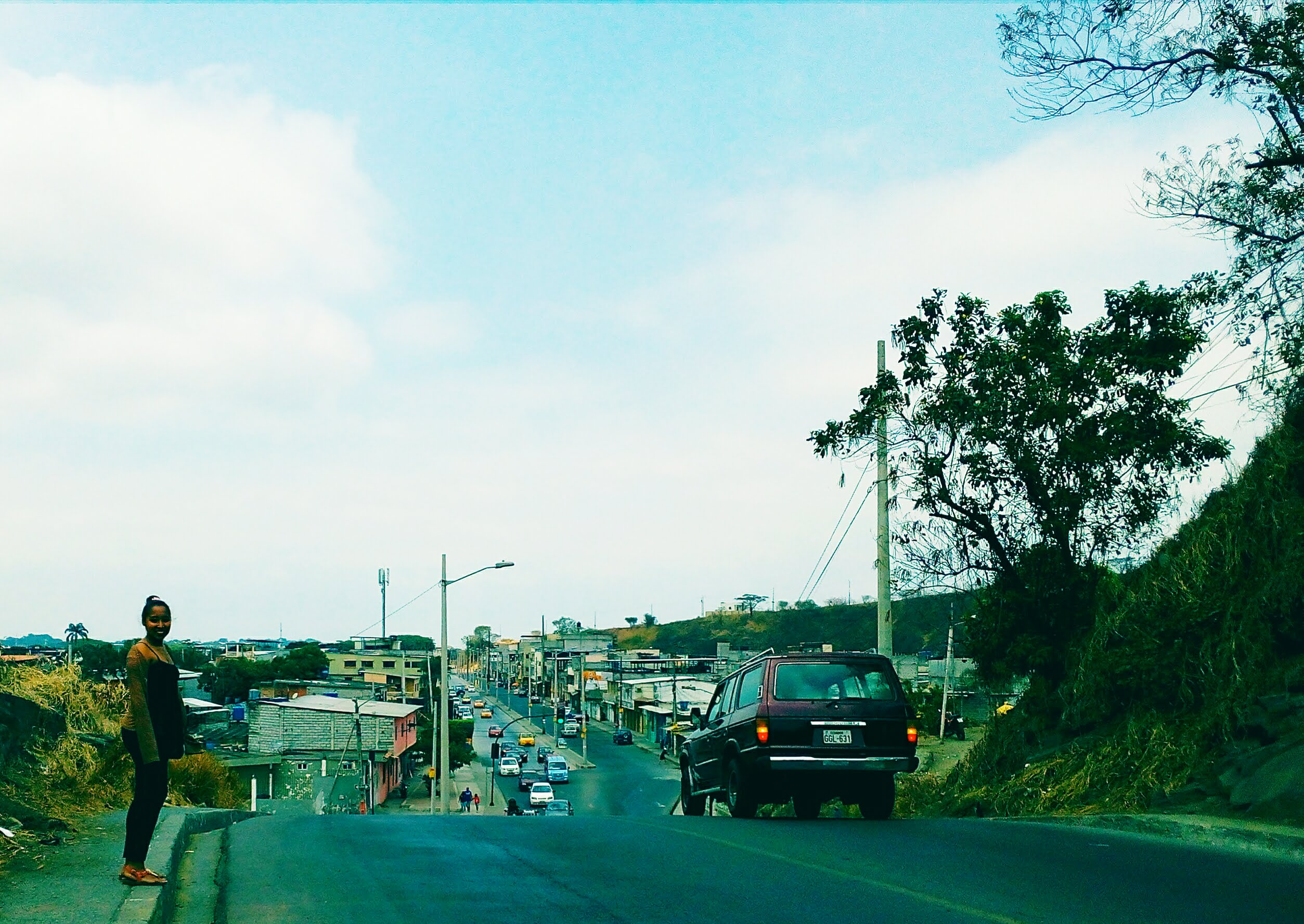
5. Durán

| No. | City | Province | 2022 Census | 2010 Census | 2001 Census | 1990 Census |
|---|---|---|---|---|---|---|
| 1 | **Guayaquil** | Guayas | 2,650,288 | 2,291,158 | 1,985,379 | 1,508,444 |
| 2 | **Quito** | Pichincha | 1,763,275 | 1,607,734 | 1,399,378 | 1,100,847 |
| 3 | **Cuenca** | Azuay | 361,524 | 329,928 | 277,374 | 194,981 |
| 4 | **Santo Domingo** | Santo Domingo | 334,826 | 270,875 | 199,827 | 114,422 |
| 5 | Durán | Guayas | 295,211 | 230,839 | 174,531 | 82,359 |
| 6 | **Machala** | El Oro | 288,072 | 231,260 | 204,578 | 144,197 |
| 7 | Manta | Manabí | 258,697 | 217,553 | 183,105 | 125,505 |
| 8 | Calderón | Pichincha | 249,941 | 149,235 | | |
| 9 | **Portoviejo** | Manabí | 244,129 | 206,682 | 171,847 | 132,937 |
| 10 | **Loja** | Loja | 203,496 | 170,280 | 118,532 | 94,305 |
| 11 | Quevedo | Los Ríos | 177,792 | 150,827 | 120,379 | 86,910 |
| 12 | **Ambato** | Tungurahua | 177,316 | 165,185 | 154,095 | 124,166 |
| 13 | **Riobamba** | Chimborazo | 177,213 | 146,324 | 124,807 | 94,505 |
| 14 | Milagro | Guayas | 159,970 | 133,508 | 113,440 | 93,637 |
| 15 | **Ibarra** | Imbabura | 157,941 | 131,856 | 108,535 | 80,991 |
| 16 | **Esmeraldas** | Esmeraldas | 155,487 | 154,035 | 95,124 | 98,558 |
| 17 | Conocoto | Pichincha | 121,984 | 69,973 | | |
| 18 | La Aurora | Guayas | 116,593 | 24,835 | | |
| 19 | La Libertad | Santa Elena | 112,154 | 95,942 | 77,646 | 53,108 |
| 20 | **Babahoyo** | Los Ríos | 98,251 | 90,191 | 76,869 | 50,285 |
| 21 | Sangolquí | Pichincha | 96,647 | 75,080 | 56,794 | 35,386 |
| 22 | **Latacunga** | Cotopaxi | 77,267 | 63,842 | 51,689 | 39,882 |
| 23 | Montecristi | Manabí | 71,066 | 46,312 | 14,636 | 9,642 |
| 24 | Tumbaco | Pichincha | 70,789 | | | |
| 25 | Pasaje | El Oro | 60,147 | 52,673 | 45,526 | 32,947 |
| 26 | Santa Rosa | El Oro | 56,842 | 48,929 | 42,593 | 32,648 |
| 27 | **Tulcán** | Carchi | 56,719 | 53,558 | 47,359 | 37,069 |
| 28 | Huaquillas | El Oro | 56,021 | 47,706 | 40,183 | 27,368 |
| 29 | **Nueva Loja** | Sucumbíos | 55,627 | 48,562 | 34,106 | 13,165 |
| 30 | La Puntilla | Guayas | 55,357 | 29,803 | 13,073 | 4,578 |
| 31 | Chone | Manabí | 54,629 | 52,810 | 45,526 | 41,437 |
| 32 | **Santa Elena** | Santa Elena | 54,565 | 39,681 | 27,351 | 17,459 |
| 33 | El Carmen | Manabí | 52,366 | 46,358 | 33,382 | 22,870 |
| 34 | **Coca** | Orellana | 51,281 | 40,730 | 18,298 | 7,805 |
| 35 | Playas | Guayas | 48,156 | 34,409 | 24,070 | 16,590 |

=== Alphabetical ===
- Ambato
- Arajuno
- Archidona
- Atacames
- Atuntaqui
- Azogues
- Babahoyo
- Baeza
- Bahía de Caráquez
- Balao
- Balsas
- Balzar
- Baños de Agua Santa
- Bucay
- Calceta
- Carlos Julio Arosemena Tola
- Catarama
- Chone
- Coca
- Colimes
- Coronel Marcelino Maridueña
- Cotacachi
- Cuenca
- Daule
- Durán
- El Chaco
- El Empalme
- El Guabo
- El Triunfo
- Esmeraldas
- Gualaquiza
- Guaranda
- Guayaquil
- Huaquillas
- Ibarra
- Isidro Ayora
- Jama
- Jujan
- La Concordia
- La Libertad
- Lago Agrio
- Latacunga
- Limones
- Logroño
- Loja
- Lomas de Sargentillo
- Macas
- Machala
- Manta
- Mera
- Milagro
- Montecristi
- Muisne
- Naranjal
- Nobol
- Nuevo Rocafuerte
- Otavalo
- Paján
- Palestina
- Palora
- Pasaje
- Pedernales
- Pedro Carbo
- Pichincha
- Pimampiro
- Piñas
- Playas
- Portovelo
- Portoviejo
- Puerto Ayora
- Puerto Baquerizo Moreno
- Puerto El Carmen de Putumayo
- Puerto López
- Puerto Villamil
- Puyo
- Quevedo
- Quinindé
- Quito (capital)
- Riobamba
- Rioverde
- Rocafuerte
- San Lorenzo
- San Vicente
- Santa Rosa
- Santo Domingo
- Salinas
- Samborondón
- Santa Elena
- Simón Bolívar
- Sucre
- Sucúa
- Tarapoa
- Tena
- Tosagua
- Tulcán
- Urcuquí
- Valencia
- Ventanas
- Vinces
- Yaguachi
- Yantzaza
- Zamora
- Zaruma

== See also ==
- Cantons of Ecuador
- Provinces of Ecuador
- Lists of cities by country
