= La Concordia =

La Concordia may refer to:

- La Concordia, Ecuador, the capital of La Concordia Canton, Ecuador
- La Concordia, Chiapas, a municipality and a town in Chiapas, Mexico
- La Concordia, Jinotega, a municipality in Jinotega department, Nicaragua
- La Concordia, Uruguay, a village in Soriano department, Uruguay
