= Janina Rizzo Alvear =

Ecuadorian politician (born 1972)

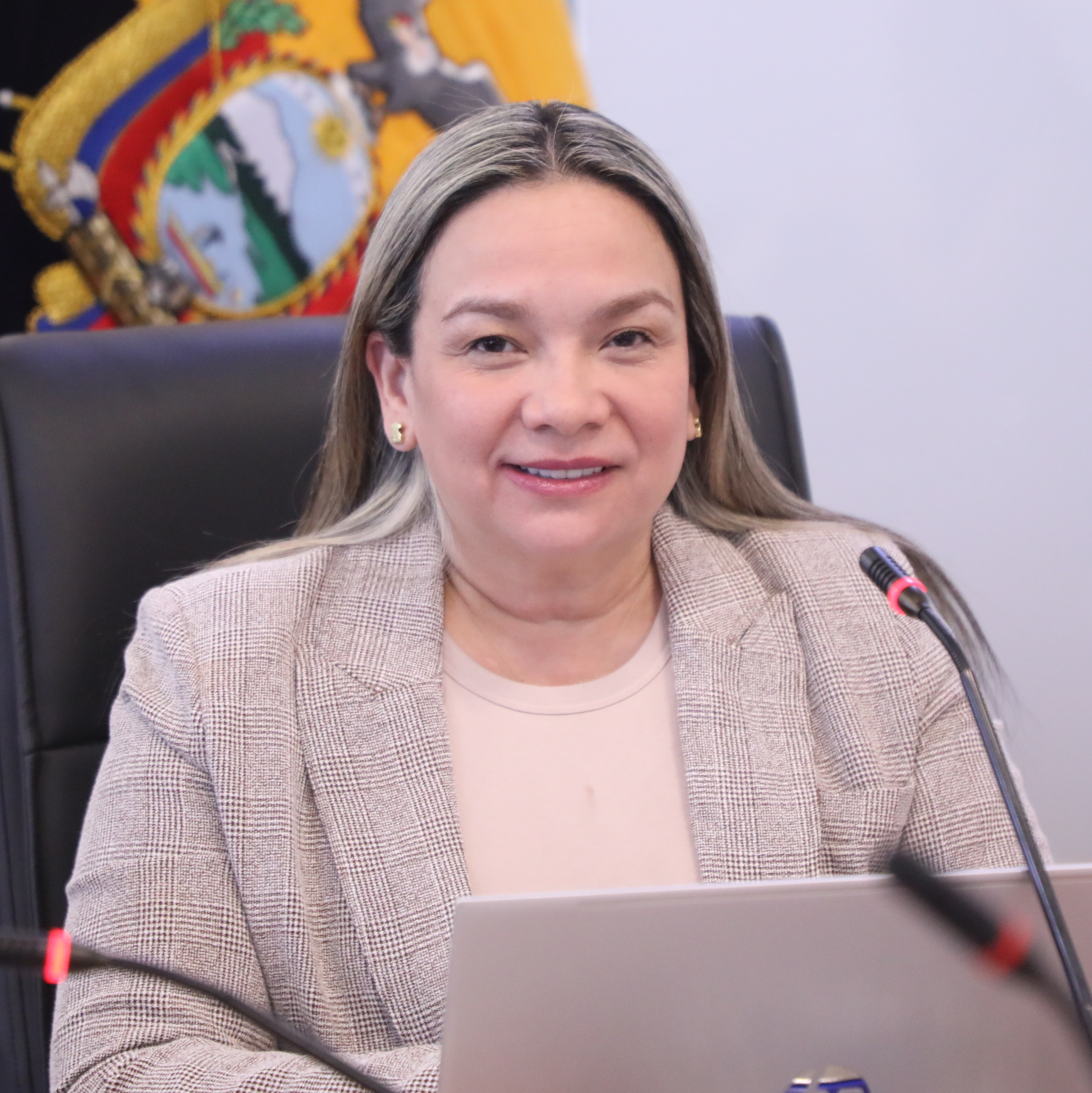
- Born: 9 April 1972 (age 54); Baba Canton
- Employer: Industrial Molinera
- Political party: National Democratic Action Movement (ADN)

Janina Jadira Rizzo Alvear (born April 9, 1972) is an Ecuadorian member of the national assembly from 2025. She led the National Assembly's Commission for Food Sovereignty.

== Life ==
Alvear was born in 1972 in Baba Canton. She attended José Herboso Public School and La Providencia Private School before joining the Vicente Rocafuerte Lay University in the city of Guayaquil. She graduated with a degree in Business Administration Engineering.

She worked at Industrial Molinera as a sales manager. The company is one that is controlled by (later President) Daniel Noboa.

She joined the National Democratic Action Movement (ADN). In 2025 she was elected to the National Assembly to be one of the represents for the Province of Guayas. Her alternate was Alvarado Campi Luis Ricardo. She was promoted to be the president of the standing Commission for Food Sovereignty and Development of the Agricultural and Fisheries Sector. Her vice president is Juan Gonzaga Salazar and the other members of the commission include Nuria Butiña, Besibell Mendoza and Lorena Rosado Sánchez.
