= Buena Fe Canton =

Buena Fe Canton San Jacinto Of Buena Fe
- Canton
- Location of Los Rios Province in Ecuador.

- Buena Fe Canton in Los Ríos Province
- Coordinates: 0°53′54.8592″S 79°29′20.0976″W
- Country: Ecuador
- Province: Los Ríos Province

Area
  - Total: 581.3 km^{2} (224.4 sq mi)

Population (2022 census)
  - Total: 74,410
  - Density: 128.0/km^{2} (331.5/sq mi)
- Time zone: UTC-5 (ECT)

Buena Fe Canton is a canton in Los Ríos Province, Ecuador. Its capital is the town of Buena Fe. Its population at the 2001 census was 47,361.

In 1943 Medardo Rosa Espinoza Cabezas Figueroa Carrillo settled here established a villa in what is now the Las Vegas. The name of Good Faith gradually extended to the growing village.

Having reached a relative development, by decree No. 174 of October 11, 1979, Buena Fe was built as a rural parish Quevedo Canton, to which it belonged until 1992, when a pro cantonization committee chaired by Mr. Gilberto Salinas got the Whole Standing Legislative Committees issued the decree in question, which after being signed by the president, Dr. Rodrigo Borja, was published in Official Gazette No. 995 of 7 August.

Buena Fe produces beef, cocoa, coffee, oil palm and fruit. Buena Fe belongs to the district rural parish Patricia Pilar and sections of San Francisco, Four Mangas, La Reserva, Fumisa, May 24, Glance, The Fourteen, Pechiche, Los Angeles and Zulema.

== Demographics ==
Ethnic groups as of the Ecuadorian census of 2010:

- Mestizo 67.7%
- Montubio 18.1%
- Afro-Ecuadorian 6.9%
- White 6.7%
- Indigenous 0.3%
- Other 0.3%
