= Honor y libertad =

2001 non-fiction book by María Eugenia Chaves

Honor y libertad: Discursos y recursos en la estrategia de libertad de una mujer esclava (Guayaquil a fines del período colonial)
- Author: María Eugenia Chaves
- Publisher: University of Gothenburg
- Publication date: 2001

Honor y libertad: Discursos y recursos en la estrategia de libertad de una mujer esclava (Guayaquil a fines del período colonial) by María Eugenia Chaves is a biography of María Chiquinquirá, an Afroecuadorian woman who successfully won freedom for her and her daughter. Originally presented as Chave's PhD thesis, the book was published in 2001 by the Institute of Ibero-American Studies at the University of Gothenburg.

== General references ==
- Bernard, Lavallé (2002). "María Eugenia Chaves, Honor y libertad. Discursos y recursos en la estrategia de libertad de una mujer esclava (Guayaquil a fines del periodo colonial)". Caravelle. 79: 286–288.
- Earle, Rebecca (November 2003). "María Eugenia Chaves, Honor y libertad: discursos y recursos en la estrategia de libertad de una mujer esclava ( Guayaquila fines del período colonial ) (Gothenburg, Sweden: Departamento de Historia e Instituto Iberoamericano de la Universidad de Gotemburgo, 2001), pp. 311, pb". Journal of Latin American Studies. 35 (4): 900–902. doi:10.1017/S0022216X03417045. ISSN 0022-216X.
- Hamerly, Michael T (2004). "Honor y libertad: Discursos y recursos en la estrategia de libertad de una mujer esclava (Guayaquil a fines del periodo colonial) (review)". Hispanic American Historical Review. 84 (1): 144–146. ISSN 1527-1900.
- Regalado, Juan Fernando (2015-02-04). "María Eugenia Cháves, Honor y libertad. Discursos y recursos en la estrategia de libertad de una mujer esclava (Guayaquil a fines del periodo colonial), Departamento de Historia/Instituto Iberoamericano de la Universidad de Gotemburgo, 2001, 311 pp". Procesos. Revista ecuatoriana de historia. 1 (18): 143. doi:10.29078/rp.v1i18.284. ISSN 2588-0780.
