= Luis Almeida =

Luis Almeida may refer to:

- Nani (footballer), Luís Carlos Almeida da Cunha (born 1986), Portuguese footballer
- Luis Almeida (politician) (born 1958), Ecuadorian politician
