= Universidad Técnica Estatal de Quevedo =

- Type: Public university
- Established: February 1, 1984; 42 years ago
- Principal: Dr. Eduardo Díaz Ocampo, MSc.
- Location: Av. Quito km. 1 1/2 vía a Santo Domingo de los Tsachilas, Quevedo, Los Ríos Province, Ecuador
- Website: https://www.uteq.edu.ec/

The Universidad Técnica Estatal de Quevedo (State Technical University of Quevedo), is located in Quevedo, Ecuador central city and economic capital of the province of Los Ríos Province. It began on January 22, 1976, as University Extension career with the Forestry (Ingeniería Forestal) and Animal Husbandry Engineering (Ingeniería Zootécnica), under the Faculty of Agricultural Sciences at The university "Luis Vargas Torres" of Esmeraldas Province. It was created as Universidad Técnica Estatal de Quevedo (State Technical University of Quevedo) through Law of the Republic of January 26, 1984, published in Official Gazette No. 674 of February 1, 1984.

== History ==
The university was founded with the creation of the Faculty of Agricultural Sciences and its School of Forestry, Animal Husbandry Engineering, and Technology in Land and Water Management and Agricultural Mechanization, then with the passage of time establishing the Faculty of Sciences.

They are then created the School of Engineering in Agricultural Business Management and Agricultural Technologies, Agribusiness and Agricultural Surveying.

Besides the above, schools are also created Computer, Banking and Finance, Sales and Micro.

Today the name of the latter were modified, thus the creation of the Faculty of Business with its four schools: School of Informatics, School of Economics and Finance, School of Marketing and Business Management School.

In addition, today the institution has the Distance Learning Unit (DEU), the Centre of Foreign Languages (CEDI), Graduate Unit, Institute of Computer Science, a university extension in the city of Mana, Cotopaxi and various support offices in various counties within and outside of Los Ríos Province.

== Faculties ==
Faculty of Engineering, Faculty of Business Administration, Faculty of Agricultural Sciences, Faculty of Environmental Sciences, Faculty of Animal Science, Unit Distance Learning, Graduate Unit

== Departments ==
Department of Liaison and Technology Transfer, Research Department, Academic Planning Unit, Unit of Planning, Evaluation and Institutional Assurance

== Managers ==
- Department of Liaison and Technology Transfer: Lic. Edgar Vicente Pastrano Quintana, Msc.
- Research Department: Ing. Byron Wladimir Oviedo Bayas, PhD.
- Academic Planning Unit: Ing. Washington Alberto Chiriboga Casanova, Msc.
- Unit of Planning: Ing. Raúl Díaz Ocampo, PhD.
- Evaluation and Institutional Assurance: Ing. Carlos Martínez Medina, Msc.
- Faculty of Engineering: Ing. Jorge Patricio Murillo Oviedo, Msc.
- Faculty of Business Administration: Ing. Washington Villamil Carreño Rodríguez, Msc.
- Faculty of Agricultural Sciences: Ing. Leonardo Matute, Msc.
- Faculty of Environmental Sciences: Ing. Mercedes Susana Carranza Patiño, Msc.
- Faculty of Animal Science: Ing. Yenny Torres, Msc.
- Unit Distance Learning: Lic. Bolívar Yépez Yanez, Msc.
- Graduate Unit: Ing. Roque Luis Vivas Moreira, Msc.
