= Roncon =

Roncon is a surname. It may refer to:

- Giovanni Roncon (1893–1963), Italian racing cyclist
- Priya Dutt Roncon (b. 1966), Indian politician
- Teresa Roncon, Canadian former journalist

== As a nickname ==
- Guillermo Ayoví Erazo (1930–2022), Ecuadorian musician known as Papá Roncón
