= Luis Almeida (politician) =

Ecuadorian politician

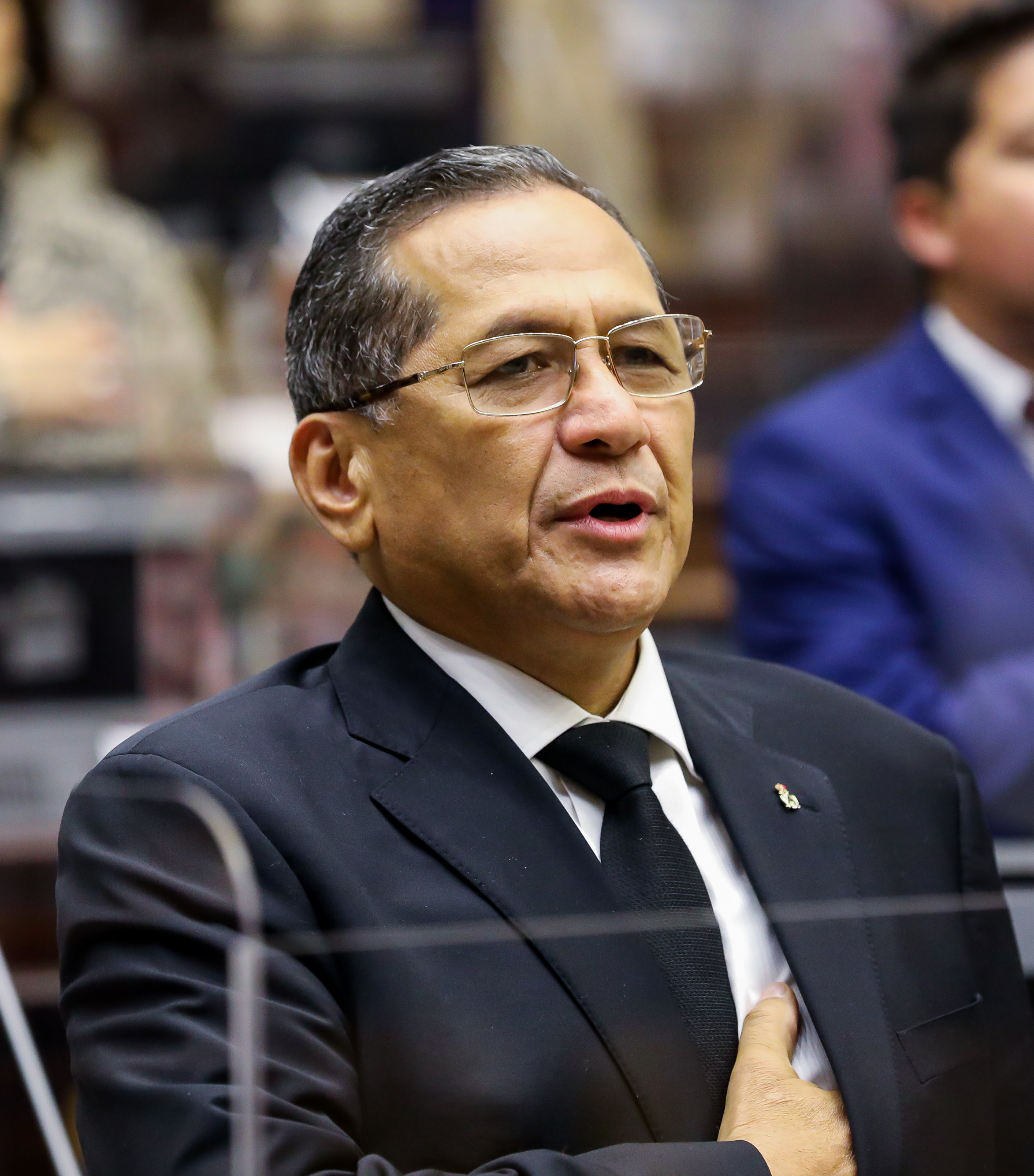
- Almeida in 2022

National Assemblyman of Ecuador District 1 of Guayas
- In office May 14, 2021 – May 17, 2023

Municipal Councilor of Guayaquil
- In office May 14, 2019 – September 2, 2020

National Deputy of Ecuador for Guayas
- In office 2007–2007

Personal details
- Born: Luis Fernando Almeida Morán; June 24, 1958 (age 68) Vinces, Los Rios Province, Ecuador
- Party: Christian Social Party (1994-2009, 2019-present); Patriotic Society Party (2009-2013)
- Education: Cooperative University of Colombia

Luis Fernando Almeida Morán is an Ecuadorian politician and lawyer. He served in the National Assembly from 2009 to 2013 and again from 2021 to 2023 representing District 1 of Guayas Province, as municipal councilor of Guayaquil from 2019 to 2020, and as a deputy for Guayas from 1994 to 1996, 2003 to 2005, and 2007.

== Biography ==
Almeida was born on June 24, 1958, in Vinces, Los Ríos Province. He completed his higher education at the Universidad Cooperativa de Colombia in Ecuador, where he earned a law degree. Almeida began his political career in 1994, when he was elected deputy in the National Congress representing Guayas for the Christian Social Party (SCP). In the 2002 legislative elections, he was elected as an alternate deputy for his wife Jenny Moran, but he took over after she resigned due to health problems. In Congress, he served on the Civil and Criminal Commission.

In November 2004, opposition parties to the Lucio Gutiérrez government announced their intention to impeach him. Almeida's SCP was at the forefront of these proceedings, but at the last moment he and fellow Social Christian MP Rocio Jaramillo defected and voted against impeachment, blocking the possibility of a trial. Almeida's move drew criticism and accusations that he accepted bribes from Gutierrez' government. Almeida asserted he voted against impeachment because members of the Masonic lodge, of which him, Jaramillo, and Gutierrez are a part of, are prohibited from voting against one another. This explanation was rejection by SCP deputy and former Ecuadorian president León Febres Cordero, who called on Almeida to resign his seat. At the end of April 2005 following the Outlaw rebellion that ousted Gutierrez, Almeida and ten other MPs were forced to resign.

In the 2006 legislative election, Almeida was re-elected as deputy for Guayas under the Patriotic Society Party (PSP). This time around, he was part of the international affairs and national defense committee. In November 2007, he was removed from office along with the rest of the deputies following the 2007 Ecuadorian Constituent Assembly election.

In 2009, Almeida was again re-elected as a national assemblyman for Guayas under the SCP. He unsuccessfully attempted to retain his seat in 2013.

During the 2019 regional elections, he was elected municipal councilor of Guayaquil for the SCP. He resigned from the position in 2020 to run as assemblyman again, where he won the election in 2021.
