= Buena Fe =

Buena Fe may refer to:

== Music ==
- Buena Fe (band), a Cuban duo

== Places ==
- Buena Fe, Ecuador, a city in Los Ríos Province
