= Marcos Restrepo =

Latin American painter

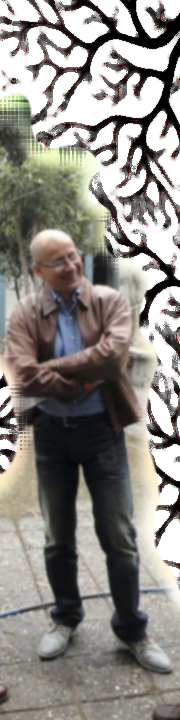
- Born: 1961 (age 63–64); Catarama, Ecuador
- Occupation: Painter
- Movement: Artefactoría
- Awards: Second Prize of the V Biennial of International Painting, Cuenca, Ecuador

Marcos Restrepo (born 1961, Catarama, Ecuador) Restrepo is a Latin American painter who is a member of the artist group Artefactoría, founded by Xavier Patiño. Artefactoría was formed in 1982 by a group of painters from the School of Fine Arts in Guayaquil who are inspired by the surrealists and the unconscious. Members of Artefactoria include: Restrepo, Xavier Patiño, Jorge Velarde, Pedro Dávila, Marco Alvarado, Flavio Álava, Paco Cuesta

In 1996, Restrepo obtained the Second Prize of the V Biennial of International Painting in Cuenca, Ecuador for his painting Al Finál del Hueco (shown right). In 1986, Restrepo obtained an honorable mention in the Hall Prize of Paris chiquito.

== Some exhibitions ==
- 1977 - Hall October, Guayaquil
- 1978 - Young Painting, Guayaquil
- 1980 - Hall Julio, Guayaquil
- 1982 - Pinacoteca of the Central bank of Ecuador, Guayaquil
- 1983 - Hall Vicente Rocafuerte, Guayaquil
- 1985 - Contemporary sacred art of Ecuador, Guayaquil
- 1989 - I Hall Art PROESA, Quito
- 1992 - Permanent Exhibition Seville 92
- 1997 - Shared worlds, National Museum of the Central Bank of Ecuador, Quito
- 2006 - Museo Municipal de Arte Moderno, Exposición del Fondo Patrimonial del Museo, Cuenca, Ecuador
