= Caroline Chang =

Ecuadorian doctor and politician

Caroline Chang Campos (born 1966 in Quevedo, Ecuador) is an Ecuadorian physician and politician. She was Ecuadorian Minister of Public Health under President Rafael Correa. She currently is Executive Secretary of the Andean Health Organisation - Convenio Hipolito Anunue (ORAS CONHUE). She was re-elected in November 2012.
