= Santo Domingo, Ecuador =

Santo Domingo
- City
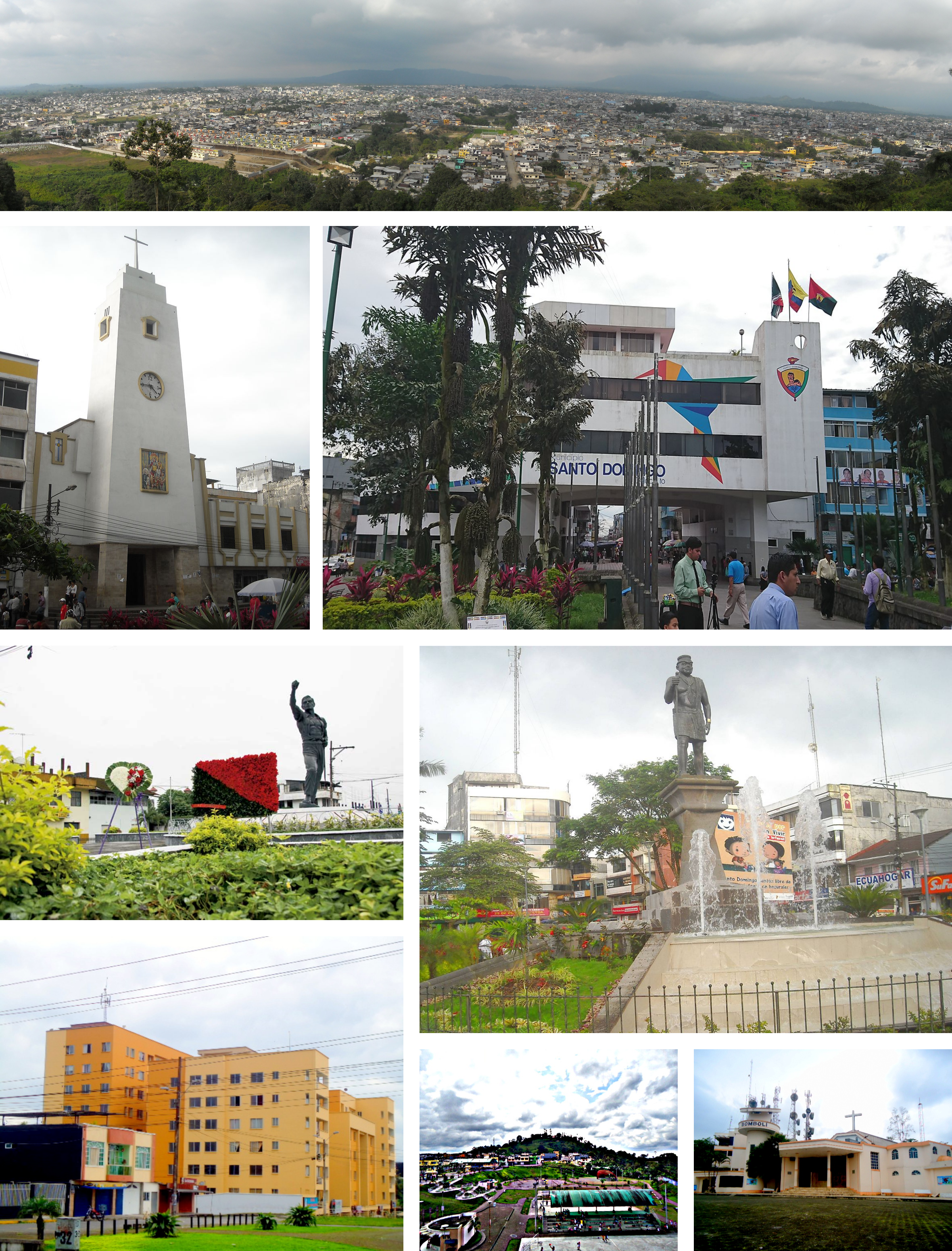
- From top, left to right: Panoramic view of Santo Domingo, Cathedral of the Ascension of the Lord, City hall of Santo Domingo, monument to the Settler, Zaracay Park, Vista Hermosa Towers, Bomboli hill and Sanctuary of Holy Mary de Bomboli.

- Location within Ecuador
- Coordinates: 00°15′15″S 79°10′19″W
- Country: Ecuador
- Province: Santo Domingo de los Tsáchilas
- Canton: Santo Domingo
- Created: May 29, 1861
- Named for: Los Colorados, Jesus
- Urban Parishes: List of parishes: Abraham Calazacón; Bomboli; Chiguilpe; Río Toachi; Río Verde; Los Colorados; Zaracay

Government
  - Mayor: Wilson Erazo Argoti

Area
  - City: 67.14 km^{2} (25.92 sq mi)
  - Canton: 3,454 km^{2} (1,334 sq mi)
- Elevation: 625 m (2,051 ft)

Population (2022 census)
  - City: 334,826
  - Rank: 4th in Ecuador
  - Density: 4,987/km^{2} (12,920/sq mi)
  - Canton: 441,583
  - Canton density: 127.8/km^{2} (331.1/sq mi)
- Demonym: Santodomingueño
- Area code: (+593) 02
- Climate: Af
- Website: www.santodomingo.gov.ec/ (in Spanish)

Santo Domingo de los Colorados, often simply referred to as Santo Domingo (Quechua: Tsachila), is an Ecuadorian city and seat of the canton that bears its name and the Santo Domingo de los Tsáchilas Province. It is the fourth most populous city in Ecuador, with a population of 334,826, and is an important commercial and industrial center.

== Etymology ==
The name, "de los Colorados", refers to a local ethnic group, the Tsáchila, and the custom of men in that tribe to dye their hair with extract of the achiote plant; hence "Santo Dominigo de los Colorados" or "Santo Domingo of the Dyed." This group, which is indigenous to the area, is recognised with a substantial statue near the town center.

== Geography ==
Santo Domingo is located approximately 133 km west of Quito at an elevation of 625 metres or 2,051 feet. Santo Domingo lies in the foothills west of the Andes. It is important stopping point on the road from Quito to the Pacific coast. The city also connects other lowland cities like Quevedo, Chone, and Quinindé.

The city is also the seat of the Roman Catholic Diocese of Santo Domingo de los Colorados.

=== Climate ===
Santo Domingo has a tropical rainforest climate (Köppen Af), very close to a tropical monsoon climate (Am), with some temperature reduction due to altitude. Average maxima are a very warm 26 °C or 78.8 °F and average minima a warm 19 °C or 66.2 °F. Like many other cities on this side of the Andes it floods easily during the extremely wet months from January to May when about 2,450 millimetres or 96 inches of rain can be expected in five months. Roads between Quito and coastal cities such as Esmeraldas and Manta are often washed out and require frequent work.

Climate data for Santo Domingo, elevation 660 m (2,170 ft), (1971–2000)
| Month | Jan | Feb | Mar | Apr | May | Jun | Jul | Aug | Sep | Oct | Nov | Dec | Year |
|---|---|---|---|---|---|---|---|---|---|---|---|---|---|
| Mean daily maximum °C (°F) | 26.2 (79.2) | 27.0 (80.6) | 27.8 (82.0) | 27.7 (81.9) | 27.0 (80.6) | 26.1 (79.0) | 25.9 (78.6) | 26.0 (78.8) | 25.9 (78.6) | 25.4 (77.7) | 25.2 (77.4) | 25.3 (77.5) | 26.3 (79.3) |
| Mean daily minimum °C (°F) | 18.9 (66.0) | 19.1 (66.4) | 19.4 (66.9) | 19.3 (66.7) | 19.3 (66.7) | 18.8 (65.8) | 18.1 (64.6) | 18.0 (64.4) | 18.2 (64.8) | 18.3 (64.9) | 18.1 (64.6) | 18.6 (65.5) | 18.7 (65.6) |
| Average precipitation mm (inches) | 525.0 (20.67) | 495.0 (19.49) | 559.0 (22.01) | 538.0 (21.18) | 323.0 (12.72) | 177.0 (6.97) | 86.0 (3.39) | 61.0 (2.40) | 102.0 (4.02) | 85.0 (3.35) | 80.0 (3.15) | 196.0 (7.72) | 3,227 (127.07) |
| Average relative humidity (%) | 91 | 90 | 90 | 90 | 90 | 92 | 91 | 91 | 91 | 91 | 91 | 91 | 91 |
Source: FAO
