= Babahoyo Canton =

- Canton
- Location of Los Rios Province in Ecuador.

- Babahoyo Canton in Los Ríos Province
- Coordinates: 1°48′S 79°32′W
- Country: Ecuador
- Province: Los Ríos Province

Area
  - Total: 1,071 km^{2} (414 sq mi)

Population (2001)
  - Total: 178,509
  - Density: 166.7/km^{2} (431.7/sq mi)
- Time zone: UTC-5 (ECT)

Babahoyo Canton is a canton of Ecuador, located in the Los Ríos Province. Its capital is the town of Babahoyo. Its population at the 2001 census was 132,824.

== Demographics ==
Ethnic groups as of the Ecuadorian census of 2010:

- Mestizo 55.3%
- Montubio 32.9%
- Afro-Ecuadorian 7.1%
- White 4.6%
- Indigenous 0.5%
- Other 0.3%
