= Valencia Canton =

- Canton
- Location of Los Rios Province in Ecuador.

- Valencia Canton in Los Ríos Province
- Coordinates: 0.9525°S 79.3531°W
- Country: Ecuador
- Province: Los Ríos Province

Area
  - Total: 970 km^{2} (370 sq mi)

Population (2022 census)
  - Total: 51,509
  - Density: 53/km^{2} (140/sq mi)
- Time zone: UTC-5 (ECT)

Valencia Canton is a canton of Ecuador, located in the Los Ríos Province. Its capital is the town of Valencia. Its population at the 2001 census was 32,870.

== Demographics ==
Ethnic groups as of the Ecuadorian census of 2010:

- Mestizo 59.3%
- Montubio 28.2%
- Afro-Ecuadorian 6.9%
- White 4.8%
- Indigenous 0.6%
- Other 0.2%
