= La Concordia Canton =

- Canton
- Coordinates: .0023°N 79.3846°W
- Country: Ecuador
- Province: Santo Domingo de los Tsáchilas Province

Area
  - Total: 324.4 km^{2} (125.3 sq mi)

Population (2022 census)
  - Total: 51,386
  - Density: 158.4/km^{2} (410.3/sq mi)
- Time zone: UTC-5 (ECT)

La Concordia Canton is a canton of Ecuador. It shares borders with the cantons of El Carmen, Chone, Pedernales, Puerto Quito, Quinindé, and Santo Domingo, which are part of the provinces of Manabí, Pichincha, Esmeraldas, and Santo Domingo de los Tsáchilas, respectively. Its capital is the town of La Concordia. Elections on whether to form part of one of those two provinces took place on February 5, 2012. The final resolution was to become part of Santo Domingo de los Tsáchilas Province, thus becoming the 2nd Canton of that province.

== Demographics ==
Ethnic groups as of the Ecuadorian census of 2010:

- Mestizo 72.9%
- Afro-Ecuadorian 13.9%
- White 8.5%
- Montubio 3.9%
- Indigenous 0.5%
- Other 0.3%
