= Jorge Velarde =

Latin American painter from Ecuador

- Born: 1960 (age 65–66); Guayaquil, Ecuador
- Education: School of Fine Arts in Guayaquil
- Known for: Painting
- Spouse: Anabela Garcez

Jorge Velarde (Guayaquil, Ecuador, 1960) is a Contemporary Latin American painter from Ecuador. Velarde has been drawing and painting since he was a child. At the age of 15 Velarde knew that he was meant to be a painter.

Velarde is a co-founder of Artefactoría, a group of artists that began working together in 1982 after graduating from the School of Fine Arts in Guayaquil. Artefactoría primarily consists of Velarde, Marcos Restrepo, Pedro Dávila, Xavier Patiño, Marco Alvarado, Flavio Álava, Paco Cuesta, as well as, Cuban artists Saidel Brito and Lupe Alvarez. The artists of Artefactoría are inspired by both Modernism and Surrealism, focusing on a divorce from reality and a love for the unconscious and fantasy.

In 1985, Velarde's participation with the group was put on hold after his marriage to Anabela Garcez and his move to Madrid to study cinema. While Velarde is passionate about cinema he quickly realized that it was not for him and so he returned to his love of painting. Velarde is both known for his portraits and his more contemporary art works. His portraits have often portrayed his wife as the subject. Velarde has held numerous exhibitions throughout Latin America and Spain.

== Selective individual exhibitions ==
- 2004 Galería Todo Arte. Guayaquil, Ecuador.
- 2004 Mijares Art Gallery. Miami, FL, USA.
- 2003 Museo Municipal de Arte Moderno. Cuenca, Ecuador.
- 2003 Universidad Católica. Guayaquil, Ecuador
- 2001 Galería DPM. Guayaquil, Ecuador.
- 2000 Galería Municipal Pancho Fierro. Lima, Perú.
- 2000 Galería Madeleine Hollaender. Guayaquil, Ecuador.
- 2000 La Galería. Quito, Ecuador
- 1998 La Casa de las Galerías. Cuenca, Ecuador.
- 1996 La Galería. Quito, Ecuador.
- 1995 Museo Antropológico del Banco Central del Ecuador. Guayaquil, Ecuador
- 1994 Galería La Manzana Verde. Guayaquil, Ecuador.
- 1993 Galería Madeleine Hollaender. Guayaquil, Ecuador.
- 1992 Galería La Manzana Verde. Quito, Ecuador.
- 1992 Galería La Manzana Verde. Guayaquil, Ecuador

== Awards & Medals ==
- 1993 - First Prize, Hall Julio, Guayaquil, Ecuador
