= María Chiquinquirá =

Afroecuadorian heroine

- Born: 1700s Baba Canton
- Other name: María Chiquinquirá Díaz
- Occupation: Former slave
- Employer: Presbyter Afonso Cepeda de Arizcum Elizondo
- Known for: Successfully winning her freedom in court
- Spouse: A tailor
- Children: a daughter, Carmen

María Chiquinquirá Díaz (fl. 1794) was an Afroecuadorian woman who went to court in 1794 to reclaim her freedom and that of her daughter. She was able to persuade the court in Gobierno de Guayaquil that her case held merit. After the case was ruled against her, she appealed to a higher court that determined she should remain free until the court settled the matter. The court never ruled and she died a free woman.

== Life ==
María Chiquinquirá Díaz, "a mulatto woman", was born in the Baba Canton in the 1700s. Chiquinquirá had one sibling, and her mother was one of several people owned by a priest named Presbyter Afonso Cepeda de Arizcum Elizondo. Slavery in the region was centred on Guayaquil, where a variation of slavery known as jornal had developed. Although slaveowners were still ultimately in charge, the people they had enslaved received certain freedoms in exchange for paying their owners a fee, or jornal, every day. Enslaved people like Chiquinquirá would work in private houses, and many other enslaved people at the time worked alongside free workers in the shipyards.

After her mother contracted leprosy, Chiquinquirá was abandoned by her owners. Her mother eventually died, leaving Chiquinquirá and her sibling as orphans. At this point they were destitute, but technically free people. The two children were adopted by a native Ecuadorian and looked after until their new guardian was enslaved by the Cepeda family, making Chiquinquirá and her sibling de facto their property. Chiquinquirá married a free man who worked as a tailor. They had a daughter, Maria del Carmen Espinoza, who was taken away from her by Afonso Cepeda so that her daughter could care for the priest's blind sister.

In May 1794, Chiquinquirá was being treated as a slave by Afonso Cepeda. At this point, she decided to present her case to a court in Guayaquil and demand to be treated as a free woman. The legal basis of Chiquinquirá's court case was that her mother had been abandoned by her owners, making her technically manumitted. This meant that she had been technically freed and, crucially, this free status was inherited by Chiquinquirá as one of her children. Moreover, Chiquinquirá argued that she had stayed with the Cepeda family only because they had been kind to her over the years, not out of legal obligation, and that now they were being cruel and unreasonable in their demands of her. Her case persuaded the court temporarily, but the dispute continued. In time, the Cepeda family persuaded the court and she was ordered to return to be their slave.

Chiquinquirá appealed to the Real Audiencia of Quito, the highest court, which took the case but did not resolve the dispute. Chiquinquirá was allowed her freedom until the case could be heard. One version says that the case was never heard as vital documents were lost, although another says that an out-of-court settlement was reached. Because the case was never heard, Chiquinquirá and her daughter were able to live as free people, and Chiquinquirá was still considered a free woman at the time of her death.

== Death and legacy ==
Chiquinquirá is regarded as a national hero. The Museum of Nahim Isaias in Guayaquil contains a copy of a freedom certificate for Chiquinquirá and her daughter, Carmen, which dates from 1794 to 1795. María Eugenia Chavez wrote a biography of Chiquinquirá titled Honor y libertad: Discursos y recursos en la estrategia de libertad de una mujer esclava (Guayaquil a fines del período colonial).
