= Vinces Canton =

- Canton
- Location of Los Rios Province in Ecuador.

- Vinces Canton in Los Ríos Province
- Coordinates: 1°33′S 79°44′W
- Country: Ecuador
- Province: Los Ríos Province

Area
  - Total: 711.5 km^{2} (274.7 sq mi)

Population (2022 census)
  - Total: 80,909
  - Density: 113.7/km^{2} (294.5/sq mi)
- Time zone: UTC-5 (ECT)

Vinces Canton is a canton of Ecuador, located in the Los Ríos Province. Its capital is the town of Vinces. Its population at the 2001 census was 61,565.

== Demographics ==
Ethnic groups as of the Ecuadorian census of 2010:

- Montubio 46.6%
- Mestizo 42.9%
- Afro-Ecuadorian 5.6%
- White 4.2%
- Indigenous 0.4%
- Other 0.2%
