= Petita Palma =

Ecuadorian singer (born 1927)

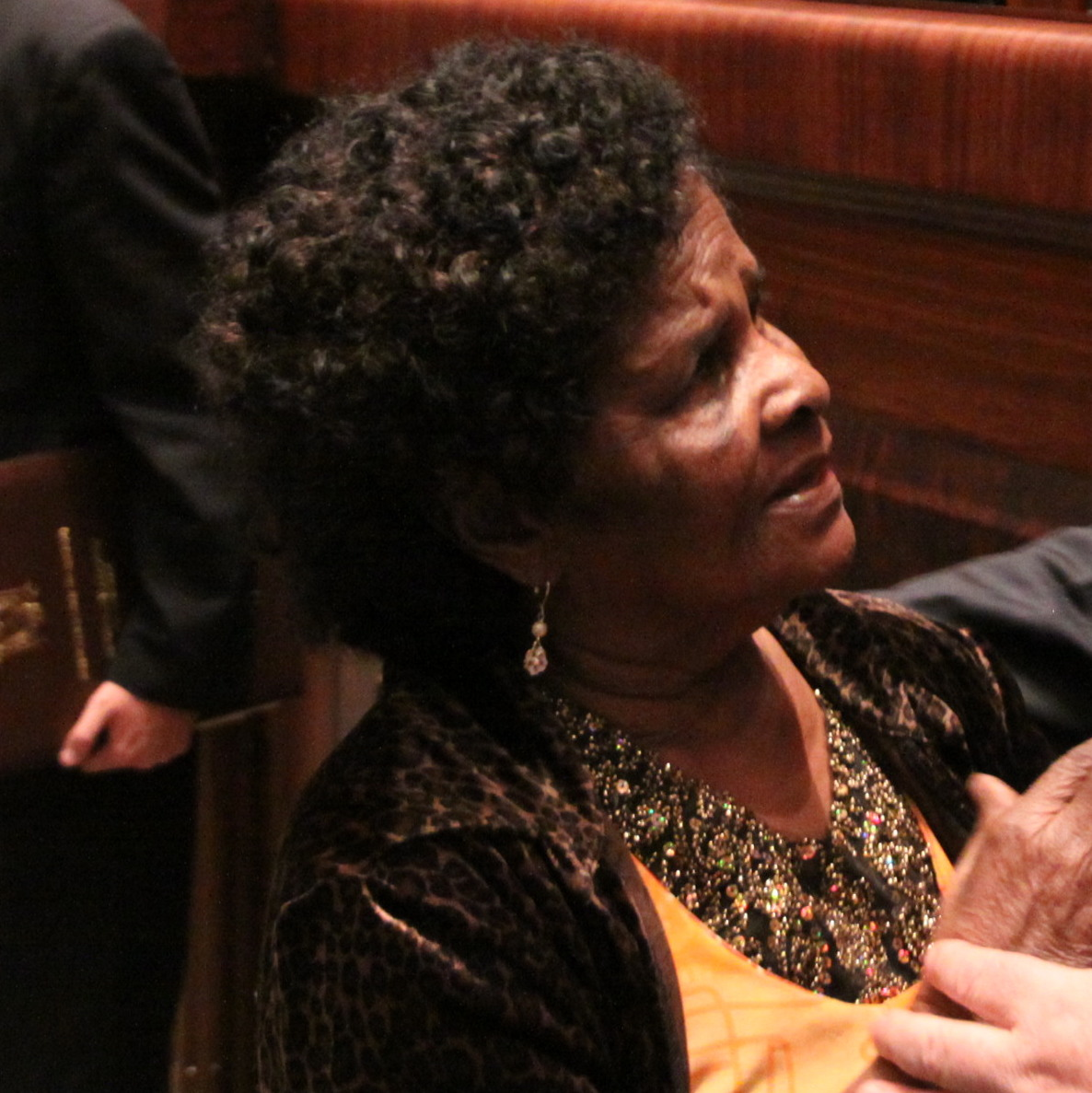
- Born: 4 March 1927 (age 99); Esmeraldas, Ecuador
- Occupation: Singer
- Known for: Marimba music

Petita Palma Piñeiros (born 4 March 1927) is an Ecuadorian singer who is regarded as a national treasure. Marimba music and traditions from the Ecuadorian province of Esmeraldas are recognised by the UN as part of the Intangible Cultural Heritage of Humanity.

== Life and career ==
Palma was born in Esmeraldas on the north-west coast of Ecuador on 4 March 1927, but she was brought up in Borbon. She discovered the marimba music and the local poetry. She regards herself as an artist and folklorist, with a special interest in the marimba instrument that is known to the Chachi people.

When she began to perform she was called the "black marimbera" which she thought was intended to be an insult. However she was proud of her ancestry and she decided that she liked the nickname.

She formed a music group called Tierra Caliente that would be with her for some time. She and the group would later create the Marimba School in 1969. Two of her songs Andarele and Caderona vení meniate became well known. The Andarele has a back story from its origins in the Montalvo Canton. It is said to come from a particular area were the musicians would play the Andarele into the night. People would arrive and be entranced so that they stayed through the night. At dawm some would want to stay, while others would say "lets go". Anderele is said to mean "lets go".

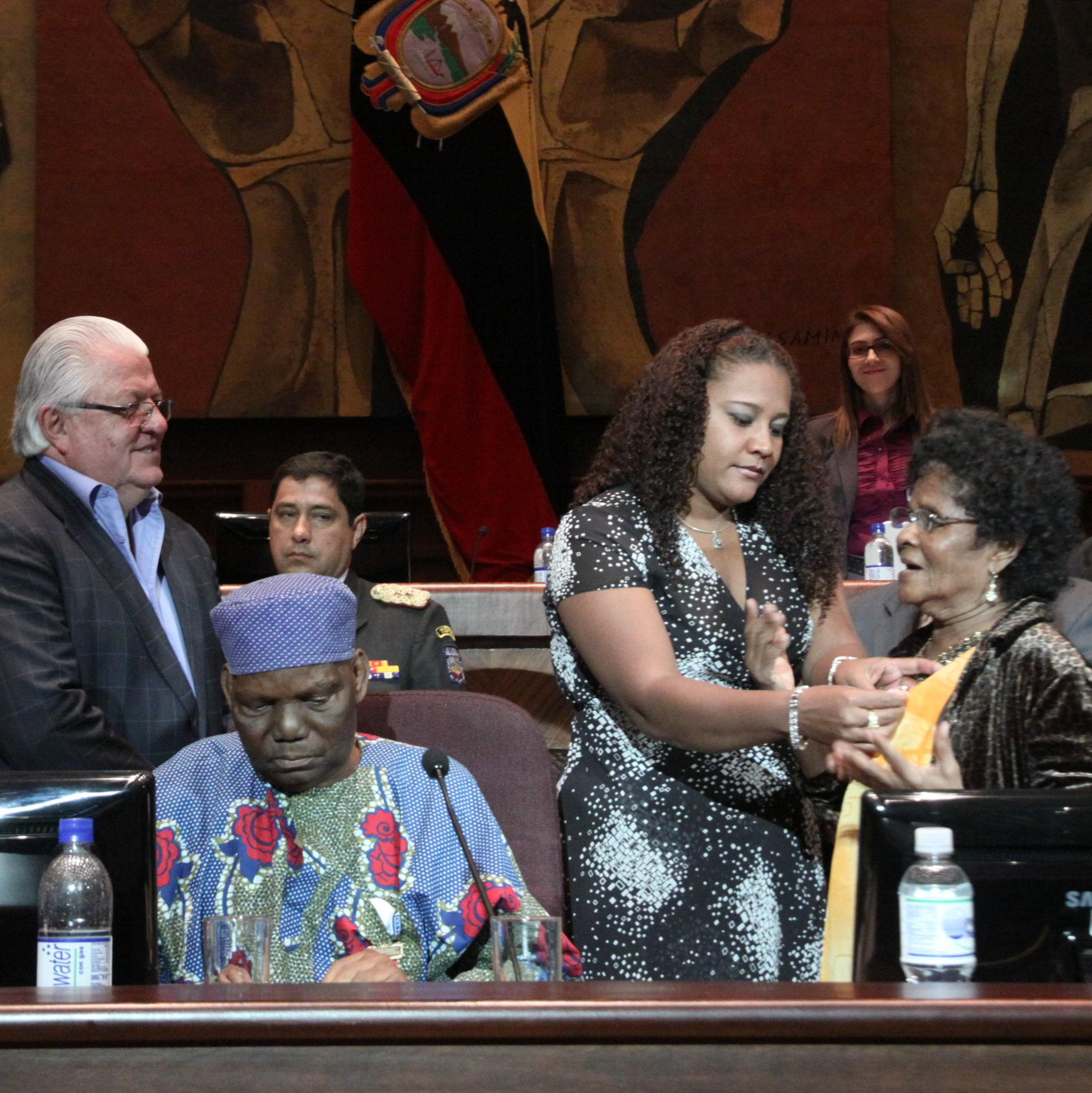
Ecuador's National Assembly praising Guillermo Ayoví Erazo and Palma.

In 2007 she received the country's highest cultural award Premio Eugenio Espejo for her group's contribution to the Ecuadorian culture through the practice and teaching of the marimba.

In July 2007, she and Guillermo Ayoví Erazo (known as Papá Roncón) were invited to Ecuador's National Assembly where a plenary session was conducted in honour of the two of them.

== Intangible cultural heritage ==
In 2015 Marimba music and traditions from the Ecuadorian province of Esmeraldas were recognised by the UN as part of the Intangible Cultural Heritage of Humanity. Palma was given another honour in 2017 when the Nigerian Embassy in Ecuador renamed its press room in her honour. In 2020 at the age of 92 she was still giving lessons. She has been quoted as saying "When you hear the voice of the marimba, the bass drum, cununo and guasá, of the singers, this is and continues to be for me like something heavenly".
