= Nuria Butiña =

Ecuadorian politician

Nuria Butiñá
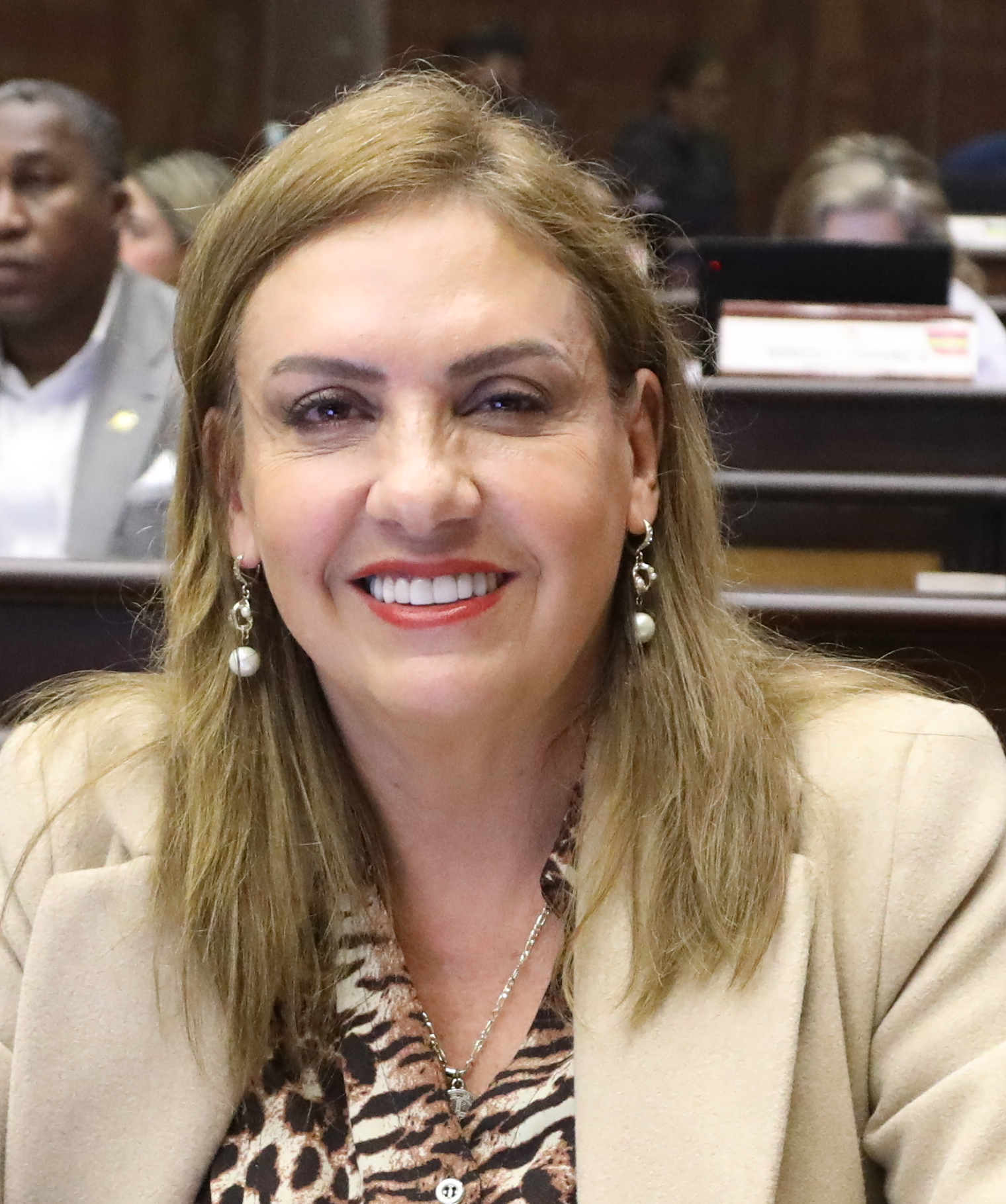
- in 2025
- Occupation: politician
- Political party: Citizen Revolution Movement

Nuria Susana Butiña Martinez is an Ecuadorian politician who became a member of the National Assembly for the Guayas Province in 2025.

== Life ==
Butiña stood for election in the Guayas Province as a Citizen Revolution Movement candidate. She was elected to the National Assembly with Walter Javier Gomez Ronquillo as her alternate.

She was chosen to join the standing Commission for Food Sovereignty and Development of the Agricultural and Fisheries Sector. Janina Rizzo Alvear was the commission's President and the vice president was Juan Gonzaga Salazar and the other members of the commission include Besibell Mendoza and Lorena Rosado Sánchez.

== Controversy ==
The first vice president of the National Assembly, Mishel Mancheno, forwarded an accusation that Butiña had demanded a monthly payment from one of her former staff members. The accusation had the support of six members of the assembly and it was referred to the assembly's ethics committee.

During session 46 of the National Assembly, the Ethics Committee presented their report which included the recommendation that Nuria Butiña should be dismissed for receiving money. Manchero presented evidence including records of bank transfers and a parallel account for salaries. Butiña said that the accusation came from a disgruntled adviser who she had sacked. 101 votes were required for her to be ejected from the assembly and the proposal attracted only 81 votes.
