= Montalvo Canton =

- Canton
- Location of Los Rios Province in Ecuador.

- Montalvo Canton in Los Ríos Province
- Coordinates: 1.7938°S 79.2857°W
- Country: Ecuador
- Province: Los Ríos Province
- Time zone: UTC-5 (ECT)

Montalvo Canton is a canton of Ecuador, located in the Los Ríos Province. Its capital is the town of Montalvo. Its population at the 2001 census was 20,067.

Petita Palma who was known as the "black marimbera" formed a group called Tierra Caliente. One of her songs Andarele became well known. The Andarele has a back story from its origins in the Montalvo Canton. It is said to come from a particular area were the musicians would play the Andarele into the night. People would arrive and be entranced so that they stayed. At dawn some would still want to stay, while others would say "lets go".

== Demographics ==
Ethnic groups as of the Ecuadorian census of 2010:

- Mestizo 66.7%
- Montubio 24.7%
- Afro-Ecuadorian 4.9%
- White 2.9%
- Indigenous 0.5%
- Other 0.2%
