= El Triunfo, Ecuador =

El Triunfo
- Town
- Location within Ecuador
- Coordinates: 2.33136°S 79.40272°W
- Country: Ecuador
- Province: Guayas
- Canton: El Triunfo Canton

Area
  - Town: 10.75 km^{2} (4.15 sq mi)

Population (2022 census)
  - Town: 41,042
  - Density: 3,818/km^{2} (9,888/sq mi)

El Triunfo (Spanish for The Triumph), formerly known as Boca de los Sapos (Frogs' cove), is a town located in Guayas, Ecuador, near the Cañar province. It is the seat of El Triunfo Canton, created in 1983.

As of the census of 2022, the town had a population of 41,042.

French priest Luis López Lescure helped the town grow. It is the most important town in eastern Guayas, as it grew around a road junction.

== Climate ==
Climate data for El Truinfo (San Carlos Ingen), elevation 35 m (115 ft), (1971–2000)
Month	Jan	Feb	Mar	Apr	May	Jun	Jul	Aug	Sep	Oct	Nov	Dec	Year
Mean daily maximum °C (°F)	30.0 (86.0)	30.2 (86.4)	30.7 (87.3)	31.1 (88.0)	29.6 (85.3)	28.2 (82.8)	27.2 (81.0)	27.7 (81.9)	28.9 (84.0)	28.2 (82.8)	28.6 (83.5)	30.0 (86.0)	29.2 (84.6)
Mean daily minimum °C (°F)	21.4 (70.5)	21.7 (71.1)	22.2 (72.0)	22.2 (72.0)	21.6 (70.9)	20.8 (69.4)	19.8 (67.6)	19.6 (67.3)	19.8 (67.6)	20.0 (68.0)	20.3 (68.5)	21.1 (70.0)	20.9 (69.6)
Average precipitation mm (inches)	303.0 (11.93)	338.0 (13.31)	348.0 (13.70)	238.0 (9.37)	85.0 (3.35)	59.0 (2.32)	22.0 (0.87)	4.0 (0.16)	10.0 (0.39)	8.0 (0.31)	27.0 (1.06)	56.0 (2.20)	1,498 (58.97)
Average relative humidity (%)	82	85	83	82	82	84	84	82	80	80	79	78	82
Source: FAO
