= Palenque Canton =

- Canton
- Location of Los Rios Province in Ecuador.

- Palenque Canton in Los Ríos Province
- Coordinates: 1.4328°S 79.7495°W
- Country: Ecuador
- Province: Los Ríos Province
- Time zone: UTC-5 (ECT)

Palenque Canton is a canton of Ecuador, located in the Los Ríos Province. Its capital is the town of Palenque. Its population at the 2001 census was 20,658.

== Demographics ==
Ethnic groups as of the Ecuadorian census of 2010:

- Montubio 69.0%
- Mestizo 23.4%
- Afro-Ecuadorian 5.1%
- White 2.1%
- Indigenous 0.2%
- Other 0.2%
