= Santo Domingo Canton (Ecuador) =

Santo Domingo de los Colorados
- Canton
- Coordinates: 00°15′S 079°09′W
- Country: Ecuador
- Province: Santo Domingo de los Tsáchilas
- Established: July 3, 1967

Area
  - Total: 3,454 km^{2} (1,334 sq mi)

Population (2022 census)
  - Total: 441,583
  - Density: 127.8/km^{2} (331.1/sq mi)

Santo Domingo de los Colorados or simply known as Santo Domingo, is the biggest canton in the Santo Domingo de los Tsáchilas Province, after La Concordia officially became part of the province on May 31, 2013. The canton is named after its seat, the town of Santo Domingo. The canton partially occupies the Toachi river basin. The Toachi river flows into the Daule river.

== Demographics ==
Ethnic groups as of the Ecuadorian census of 2010:

- Mestizo 81.0%
- Afro-Ecuadorian 7.7%
- White 6.8%
- Montubio 2.5%
- Indigenous 1.7%
- Other 0.3%

=== Political divisions ===
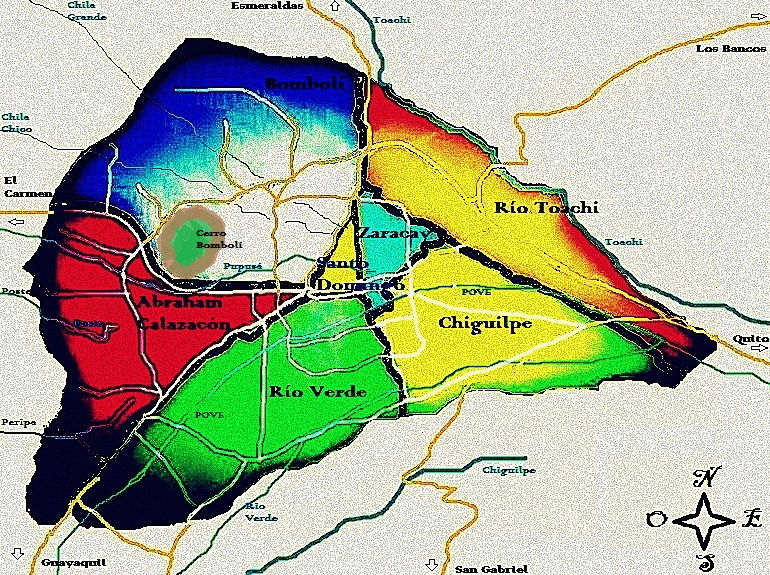
Urban parishes of Santo Domingo Canton

Santo Domingo Canton is divided into 7 urban parishes and 7 rural parishes.

- Urban parishes: Santo Domingo, Chiguilpe, Río Verde, Bombolí, Zaracay, Abraham Calazacón, Río Toachi
- Rural parishes: San José de Alluriquín, El Esfuerzo, Luz de América, Puerto Limón, San Jacinto del Búa, Santa María del Toachi, Valle Hermoso

== Climate ==
Climate data for Santo Domingo, elevation 660 m (2,170 ft), (1971–2000)
Month	Jan	Feb	Mar	Apr	May	Jun	Jul	Aug	Sep	Oct	Nov	Dec	Year
Mean daily maximum °C (°F)	26.2 (79.2)	27.0 (80.6)	27.8 (82.0)	27.7 (81.9)	27.0 (80.6)	26.1 (79.0)	25.9 (78.6)	26.0 (78.8)	25.9 (78.6)	25.4 (77.7)	25.2 (77.4)	25.3 (77.5)	26.3 (79.3)
Mean daily minimum °C (°F)	18.9 (66.0)	19.1 (66.4)	19.4 (66.9)	19.3 (66.7)	19.3 (66.7)	18.8 (65.8)	18.1 (64.6)	18.0 (64.4)	18.2 (64.8)	18.3 (64.9)	18.1 (64.6)	18.6 (65.5)	18.7 (65.6)
Average precipitation mm (inches)	525.0 (20.67)	495.0 (19.49)	559.0 (22.01)	538.0 (21.18)	323.0 (12.72)	177.0 (6.97)	86.0 (3.39)	61.0 (2.40)	102.0 (4.02)	85.0 (3.35)	80.0 (3.15)	196.0 (7.72)	3,227 (127.07)
Average relative humidity (%)	91	90	90	90	90	92	91	91	91	91	91	91	91
Source: FAO

Climate data for Chiriboga, elevation 1,680 m (5,510 ft), (1961–1990)
Month	Jan	Feb	Mar	Apr	May	Jun	Jul	Aug	Sep	Oct	Nov	Dec	Year
Mean daily maximum °C (°F)	20.7 (69.3)	20.7 (69.3)	20.8 (69.4)	21.1 (70.0)	21.7 (71.1)	21.3 (70.3)	21.7 (71.1)	21.7 (71.1)	22.2 (72.0)	21.7 (71.1)	22.2 (72.0)	21.5 (70.7)	21.4 (70.6)
Daily mean °C (°F)	16.2 (61.2)	16.2 (61.2)	16.3 (61.3)	16.5 (61.7)	16.5 (61.7)	16.1 (61.0)	15.8 (60.4)	15.8 (60.4)	16.1 (61.0)	16.2 (61.2)	16.2 (61.2)	16.2 (61.2)	16.2 (61.1)
Mean daily minimum °C (°F)	11.6 (52.9)	11.6 (52.9)	11.6 (52.9)	11.0 (51.8)	10.8 (51.4)	10.0 (50.0)	9.1 (48.4)	9.0 (48.2)	9.8 (49.6)	10.6 (51.1)	10.3 (50.5)	11.0 (51.8)	10.5 (51.0)
Average precipitation mm (inches)	301.0 (11.85)	337.0 (13.27)	407.0 (16.02)	363.0 (14.29)	227.0 (8.94)	129.0 (5.08)	46.0 (1.81)	52.0 (2.05)	99.0 (3.90)	107.0 (4.21)	93.0 (3.66)	170.0 (6.69)	2,331 (91.77)
Source: FAO
