= El Triunfo Canton =

- Canton
- Location of Guayas in Ecuador.

- El Triunfo Canton in Guayas Province
- Coordinates: 2.33°S 79.40°W
- Country: Ecuador
- Province: Guayas Province
- Capital: El Triunfo

Area
  - Total: 559.9 km^{2} (216.2 sq mi)

Population (2022 census)
  - Total: 60,541
  - Density: 108.1/km^{2} (280.1/sq mi)
- Time zone: UTC-5 (ECT)

El Triunfo Canton is a canton of Ecuador, located in the Guayas Province. Its capital is the town of El Triunfo. Its population at the 2001 census was 34,117.

The Canton was created in 1983, but some of it is disputed with La Troncal Canton in Cañar Province.

== Demographics ==
Ethnic groups as of the Ecuadorian census of 2010:

- Mestizo 75.2%
- Afro-Ecuadorian 10.0%
- White 7.1%
- Montubio 6.6%
- Indigenous 0.8%
- Other 0.3%
