= Mocache Canton =

- Canton
- Location of Los Rios Province in Ecuador.

- Mocache Canton in Los Ríos Province
- Coordinates: 1.18385°S 79.50553°W
- Country: Ecuador
- Province: Los Ríos Province
- Time zone: UTC-5 (ECT)

Mocache Canton is a canton of Ecuador, located in the Los Ríos Province. Its capital is the town of Mocache. Its population at the 2001 census was 33,481.

== Demographics ==
Ethnic groups as of the Ecuadorian census of 2010:

- Montubio 72.5%
- Mestizo 22.1%
- Afro-Ecuadorian 3.0%
- White 1.8%
- Indigenous 0.5%
- Other 0.1%
