= Urdaneta Canton =

- Canton
- Location of Los Rios Province in Ecuador.

- Urdaneta Canton in Los Ríos Province
- Coordinates: 1°34′12″S 79°28′12″W
- Country: Ecuador
- Province: Los Ríos Province

Area
  - Total: 384.8 km^{2} (148.6 sq mi)

Population (2022 census)
  - Total: 33,151
  - Density: 86.15/km^{2} (223.1/sq mi)
- Time zone: UTC-5 (ECT)

Urdaneta Canton is a canton of Ecuador, located in the Los Ríos Province. Its capital is the town of Catarama. Its population at the 2001 census was 25,812.

== Demographics ==
Ethnic groups as of the Ecuadorian census of 2010:

- Montubio 57.1%
- Mestizo 36.0%
- Afro-Ecuadorian 3.8%
- White 2.6%
- Indigenous 0.4%
- Other 0.2%
