= Valencia, Ecuador =

Valencia
- City
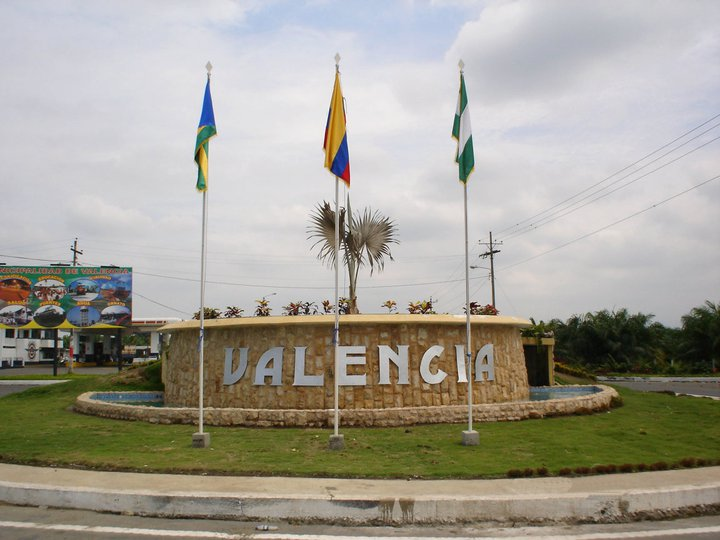
- Entrance to Valencia

- Flag
- Nicknames: "Jardín de Los Ríos (Los Ríos Garden)"
- Location of Valencia within Ecuador Valencia (South America)
- Coordinates: 00°57′09″S 79°21′10″W
- Country: Ecuador
- Province: Los Ríos
- Canton: Valencia Canton
- foundation: 13 December 1995
- Named for: Gregorio Valencia
- Urban parishes: 3 urban parishes

Government
  - Type: Mayor and council
  - Governing body: Municipality of Valencia
  - Mayor: Daniel Macías

Area (approx.)
  - City: 6.09 km^{2} (2.35 sq mi)
- Elevation: 105 m (344 ft)

Population (2022 census)
  - City: 22,996
  - Density: 3,780/km^{2} (9,780/sq mi)
  - Demonym: Valenciano
- Time zone: UTC−5 (ECT)
- Postal code: EC121150
- Area code: (0)5
- Languages: Spanish
- Climate: Aw
- Website: http://www.valencia.gob.ec/

Valencia is an ecuadorian city; cantonal head of the Valencia Canton, as well as the sixth most populated city in the Los Rios Province. It is located in the center-north of the coastal region of Ecuador, on an extensive plain, on the outer flanks of the western Andes mountain range, at an altitude of 105 meters above sea level and with a tropical rainy climate of 26 °C on average.

== Name ==
The name of Valencia originates from the year 1887 when a man named Gregorio Valencia was established on the banks of an estuary, who was dedicated to practicing sorcery, which is why he was known among its inhabitants. Thus they began to name the estuary as Estero Valencia and little by little the hamlet became known by that name.

== Geography ==
=== Location ===
The ground is a little elevated, about 60 meters above sea level. The main rivers in this area are the San Pablo, Quindigüa, Lulo, Manguila, which in winter become very mighty.

=== Climate ===
The climate of Valencia is tropical, the temperature varies between 20 and 32 degrees Celsius. Valencia is within a subtropical zone.

== History ==
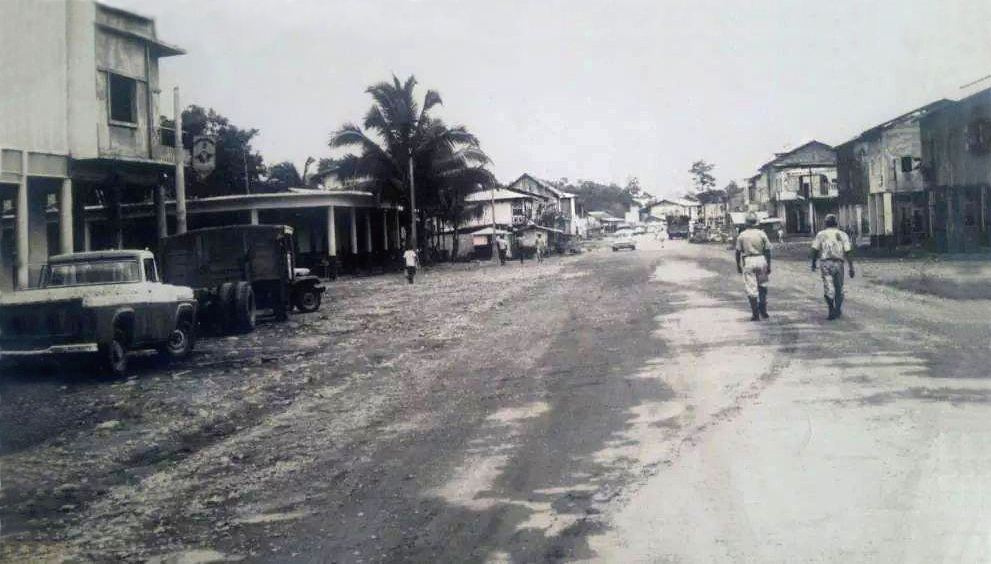
Valencia in the century XX

Before the creation of the Province of Los Ríos, there was a town inhabited by Colorado Indians that later took the name of San Pablo on the banks of the Pilaló river. Due to the destruction of the town of San Pablo de los Colorados, its inhabitants dispersed along the Pilaló River.

After a long coming and going, they settled in the area of the Chicoleado hacienda and later the expropriation of the hacienda was achieved and steps were taken to achieve its parochialization, so on August 16, 1944 the purpose was achieved. being jurisdiction of the canton Quevedo. Valencia was elevated to the category of canton on December 29, 1995 by the government of architect Sixto Durán Ballén, but the sectional authorities established that the festivities be moved to December 13.

== Economy ==
It is made up of a large number of banana packing plants, peelers, among other companies. All kinds of agricultural products are produced in the canton, especially African palm, bananas, cocoa, soybeans, coffee, plantains, rice, corn, passion fruit, and a wide variety of citrus and tropical fruits. Livestock activities are also developed.

== Government and administration ==
The city of and the canton of Valencia, like the other Ecuadorian towns, is governed by a municipality as provided in the Constitution of the Republic. The Autonomous Decentralized Municipal Government of Valencia is a sectional government entity that administers the canton autonomously from the central government. The municipality is organized by the separation of powers of an executive nature represented by the mayor, and another of a legislative nature made up of the members of the cantonal council.

== Demographic ==
Valencia is a city located in the province of Los Ríos, in Ecuador. Its population in 2010 was 16,983 inhabitants. 60 percent of the Valencian inhabitants come from other regions of the country. Due to its proximity to Quevedo, Valencia is part of the Quevedo metropolitan area, which includes the cantons of Quevedo, Mocache, Buena Fe, Valencia in the Los Ríos province, El Empalme de Guayas, Pichincha de Manabí and La Maná de Cotopaxi, placing it as the 6th in positions of Metropolitan Areas of Ecuador and one of the fastest growing.

== Culture ==
One of the traditions that Valencia has maintained since the beginning of its cantonization are the traditional bullfighting fairs considered one of the best in the province of Los Ríos, which is held annually to celebrate its patron saint festivities of San Francisco de Asís, a task that takes place It develops the first days of the month of October of each year.

=== Food ===
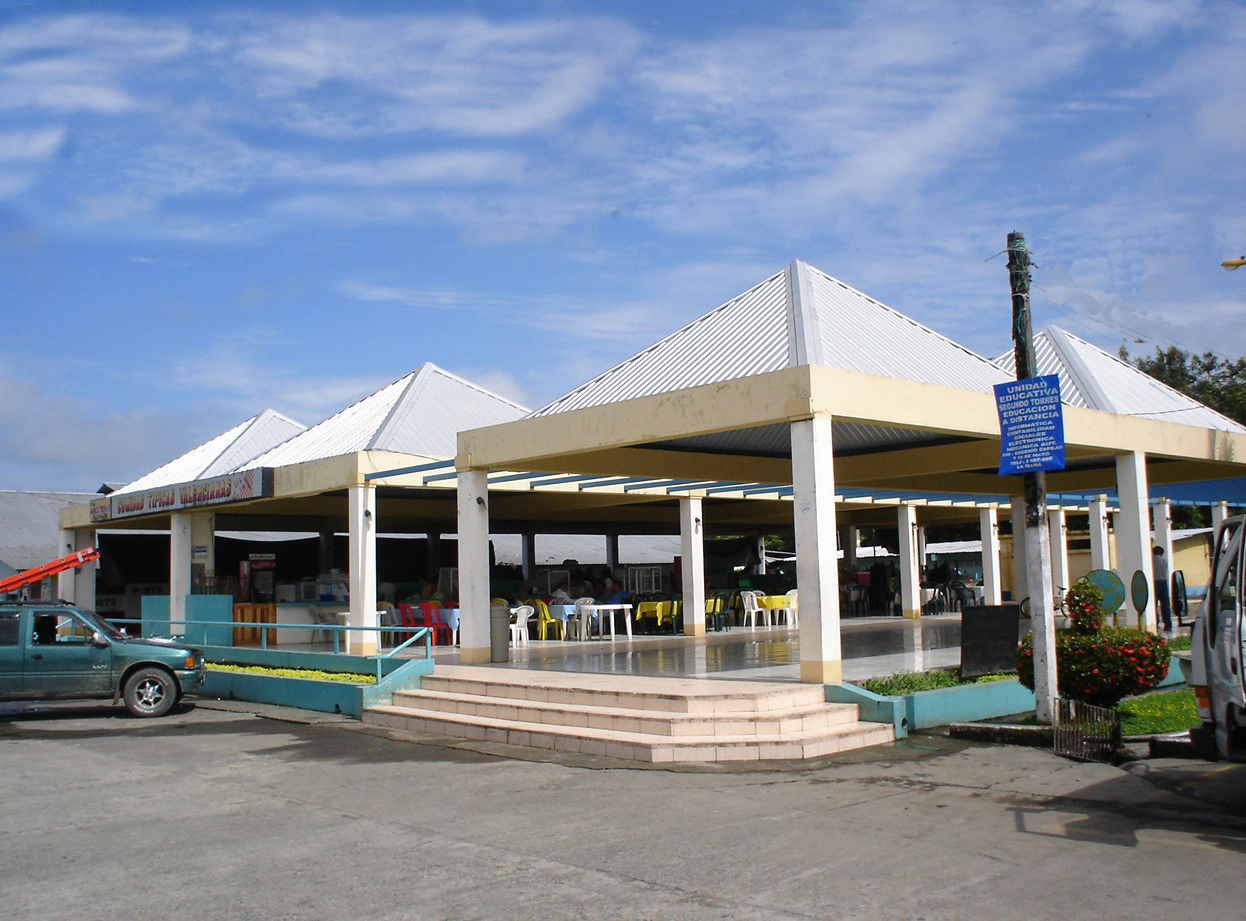
Food court in Valencia

The most typical Valencian dishes are Hornado, tilapia and hose broth, among others. It has a market, very well organized, where all kinds of vegetables, legumes and fruits from the coast and mountains are sold.

== Sport ==
=== Football ===
Club Deportivo Napoli and Club Deportivo Montry are the active Valencian teams in the Los Ríos Non-Amateur Football Association, which participate in the Los Ríos Second Category Provincial Championship.

The main sports venue for playing football is the 'Municipal Stadium of Valencia'. It is used mainly for soccer practice and has a capacity for 5,000 spectators. The stadium is the venue for different sporting events at the local level, as well as being the setting for various cultural events, especially musical concerts.

== Urban parishes ==
The city is divided into three urban parishes:

- La Unión
- Nueva Unión
- Valencia
