= Quevedo Canton =

- Canton
- Location of Los Rios Province in Ecuador.

- Quevedo Canton in Los Ríos Province
- Coordinates: 1°02′S 79°27′W
- Country: Ecuador
- Province: Los Ríos Province

Area
  - Total: 378.8 km^{2} (146.3 sq mi)

Population (2022 census)
  - Total: 206,008
  - Density: 543.8/km^{2} (1,409/sq mi)
- Time zone: UTC-5 (ECT)

Quevedo Canton is a canton of Ecuador, located in the Los Ríos Province. Its capital is the town of Quevedo, and its population at the 2001 census was 139,790.

== Demographics ==
Ethnic groups as of the Ecuadorian census of 2010:

- Mestizo 66.2%
- Montubio 16.7%
- White 8.5%
- Afro-Ecuadorian 7.5%
- Indigenous 0.8%
- Other 0.4%
