= The Triumph =

The Triumph may refer to

- HMS Triumph, several vessels of the Royal Navy
- The Triumph – An alternative title in some countries for the made-for-TV film The Ron Clark Story
- A 1917 book by William Nathaniel Harben
