= Guillermo Ayoví Erazo =

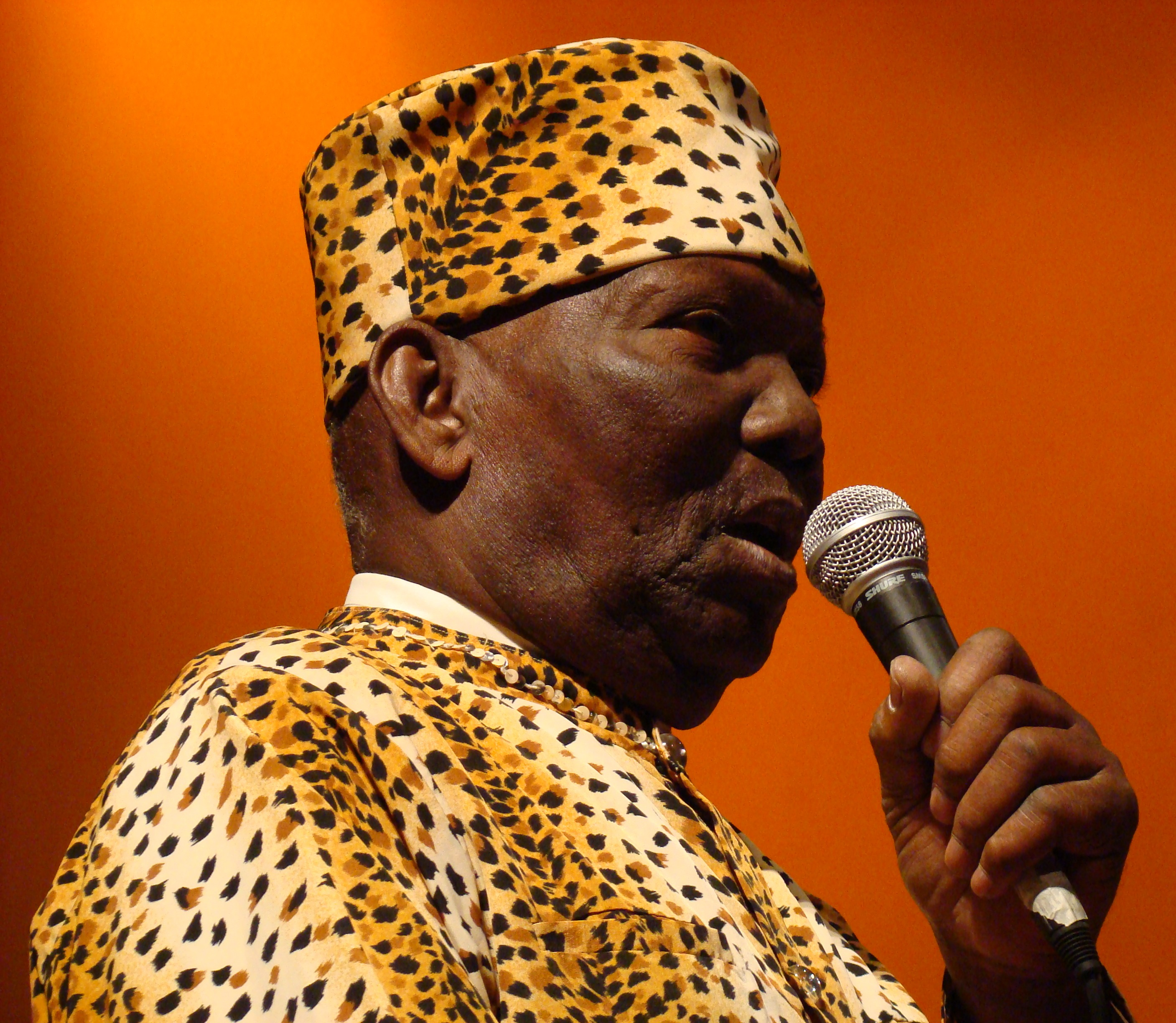

Background information
- Also known as: Papá Roncón
- Born: Guillermo Ayoví Erazo; September 10, 1930; Borbón, Esmeraldas, Ecuador
- Died: September 30, 2022 (aged 92) Borbon, Esmeraldas, Ecuador
- Occupations: Musician
- Awards: Premio Eugenio Espejo (2011)

Guillermo Ayoví Erazo (November 10, 1930 - September 10, 2022) better known as Papá Roncón was an Afro-Ecuadorian musician, singer, and marimba player.

== Life ==
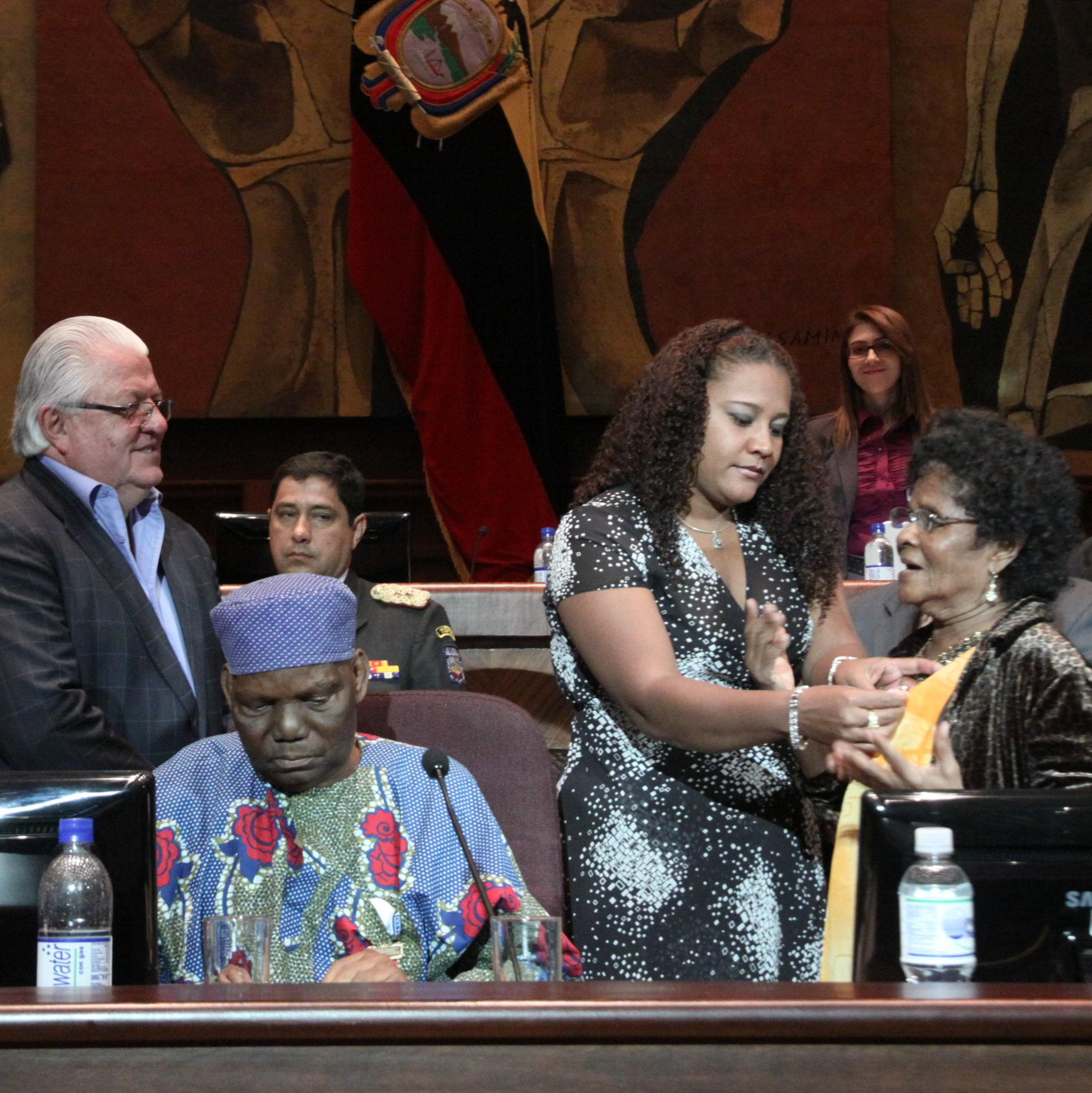
Ecuador's National Assembly praising Guillermo Ayoví Erazo and Petita Palma.

Papá Roncón was born in Borbón, Esmeraldas, Ecuador on November 10, 1930. He learned to play the marimba at an early age with the Chachi people. He began to make himself known in the 1970s, first in his village, and then at national and international levels, with tours in the United States, Venezuela, Colombia and Japan. In 2001 he received the Premio Eugenio Espejo for his contribution to the Ecuadorian culture through the practice and teaching of the marimba and traditional dances. He also directed several films, including documentaries.

In July 2007, he and Petita Palma were invited to Ecuador's National Assembly where a plenary session was conducted in honour of the two of them.

== Legacy ==
He was the founder of the school of traditional culture 'La Catanga', through which he taught dozens of children and youth to play and dance marimba in the province of Esmeraldas.

== Personal life ==
He was married to his wife Grimalda for over 50 years and they had ten children, 14 grandchildren, and about 8 great-grandchildren.

== Death ==
Papa Roncón died on 30 September 2022 at the age of 91 in Borbón, Esmeraldas.
