= Buena Fe, Ecuador =

Buena Fe San Jacinto de Buena Fe
- City
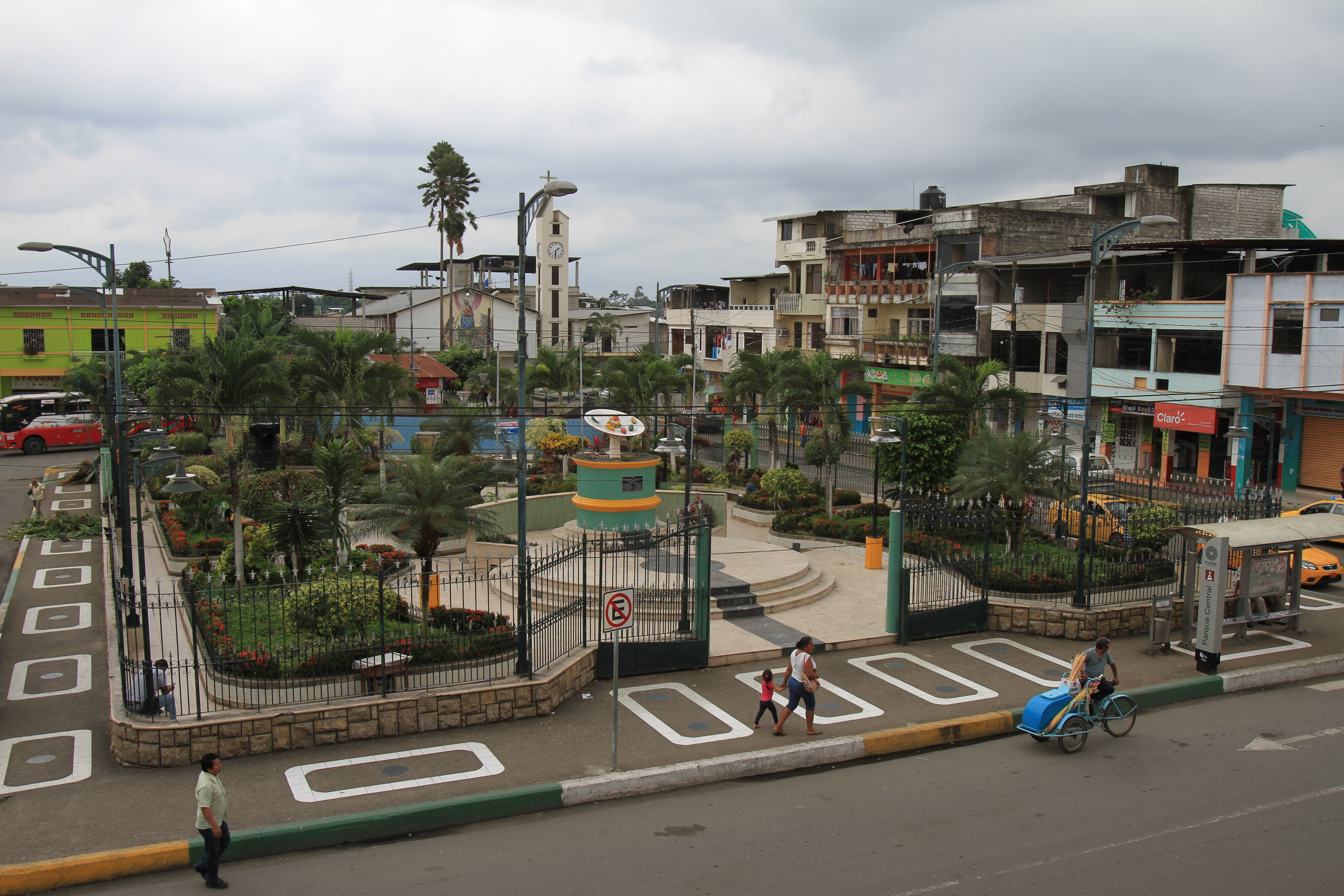

- Flag

- Location within Ecuador
- Coordinates: 0°53′55″S 79°29′20″W
- Country: Ecuador
- Province: Los Ríos
- Canton: Buena Fe

Government
  - Mayor: Diana Archundia

Area
  - City: 8.54 km^{2} (3.30 sq mi)

Population (2022 census)
  - City: 46,779
  - Density: 5,480/km^{2} (14,200/sq mi)
  - Demonym: Buenafesino
- Time zone: UTC-5 (ECT)
- Area code: (+593) 5
- Climate: Am
- Website: "http://buenafe.gob.ec/"

Buena Fe a city in Los Ríos Province, Ecuador. Its history dates back to 1943 when settlers arrived and Medardo Rosa Espinoza Cabezas Figueroa Carrillo rented a village in what is now the Las Vegas, where they set up a shop which gave the name of Buena Fe ("Good Faith"). Over the years the name became generic, and others soon built their homes in the surrounding areas, gradually forming the village. Having reached a relative development, by decree No. 174 of October 11, 1979 Buena Fe was built as a rural parish of Quevedo Canton, to which it belonged until 1992, when a pro cantonization committee chaired by Gilberto Salinas got the Whole Standing Legislative Committees issued the decree in question, which after being signed by President Rodrigo Borja Cevallos was published in Official Gazette No. 995 of 7 August. Earnest jurisdiction extends in a very fertile and rich, which has taken a big boost agro-industry, especially in the production of beef, cocoa, coffee, oil palm and a variety of fruits. Buena Fe is the rural district of parish Patricia Pilar and sections of San Francisco, Cuatro Mangas, La Reserva, Fumisa, 24 de Mayo, Glance, La Catorce, Pechiche, Los Angeles and Zulema.

San Jacinto Of Buena Fe is an urban parish of Buena Fe Canton, Los Ríos Province, Ecuador.

== Sources ==
- https://web.archive.org/web/20120427204016/http://www.inec.gov.ec/cpv/
- World-Gazetteer.com
