= La Concordia, Ecuador =

La Concordia
- City
- Location within Ecuador
- Coordinates: 00°00′24″S 79°23′45″W
- Country: Ecuador
- Province: Santo Domingo de los Tsáchilas
- Canton: La Concordia
- Created: November 15, 1955

Government
  - Mayor: Sandra Ocampo

Area
  - City: 9.21 km^{2} (3.56 sq mi)
- Elevation: 217 m (712 ft)

Population (2022 census)
  - City: 35,474
  - Density: 3,850/km^{2} (9,980/sq mi)
- Demonym: Concordense
- Area code: (+593) 02
- Climate: Am

La Concordia is a city in Ecuador that is the cantonal capital of La Concordia Canton, belonging to the Santo Domingo de los Tsáchilas Province. It is located north of the coastal region, in an extensive plain, at an altitude of 217 meters and with a rainy climate tropical climate of 25 °C on average.

== Climate ==
Though it is located on the equator, the cold Humboldt current suppresses rainfall when it reaches its northernmost extent from July to November and gives La Concordia a tropical monsoon climate (Am) instead of the usual tropical rainforest climate (Af) found at and near the equator.

Climate data for La Concordia, elevation 300 m (980 ft), (1971–2000)
Month	Jan	Feb	Mar	Apr	May	Jun	Jul	Aug	Sep	Oct	Nov	Dec	Year
Mean daily maximum °C (°F)	28.7 (83.7)	29.3 (84.7)	29.7 (85.5)	29.8 (85.6)	29.0 (84.2)	27.6 (81.7)	27.3 (81.1)	27.4 (81.3)	27.4 (81.3)	27.4 (81.3)	27.0 (80.6)	27.7 (81.9)	28.2 (82.7)
Mean daily minimum °C (°F)	21.2 (70.2)	21.0 (69.8)	21.1 (70.0)	21.3 (70.3)	21.1 (70.0)	20.4 (68.7)	19.5 (67.1)	19.2 (66.6)	19.0 (66.2)	19.7 (67.5)	19.0 (66.2)	20.0 (68.0)	20.2 (68.4)
Average precipitation mm (inches)	457.0 (17.99)	478.0 (18.82)	639.0 (25.16)	553.0 (21.77)	316.0 (12.44)	206.0 (8.11)	82.0 (3.23)	54.0 (2.13)	73.0 (2.87)	57.0 (2.24)	42.0 (1.65)	172.0 (6.77)	3,129 (123.18)
Average relative humidity (%)	90	88	87	88	89	90	89	89	90	90	88	88	89
Source: FAO
