= Catarama =

- Town
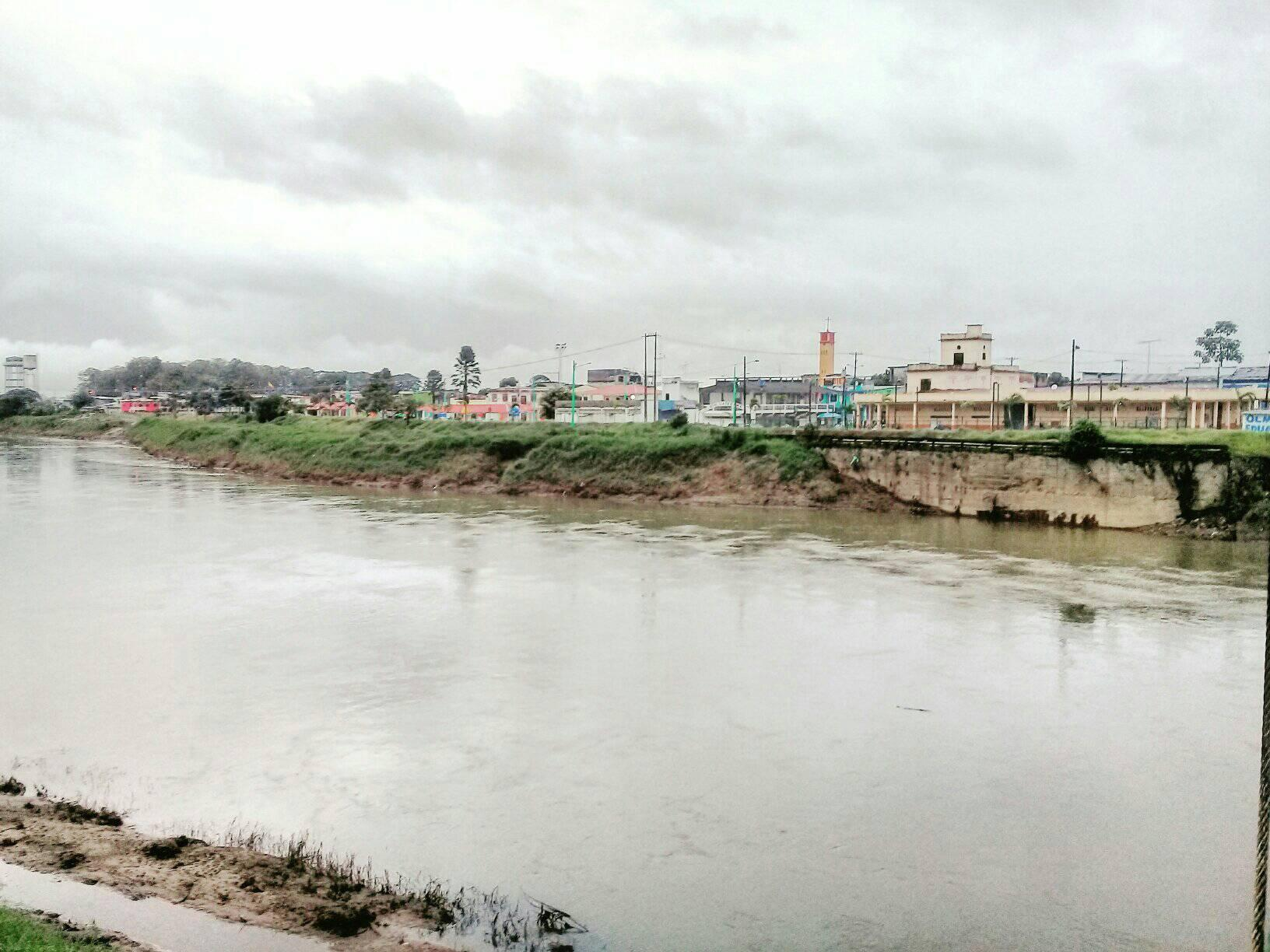

- Location within Ecuador
- Coordinates: 1°34′12″S 79°28′12″W
- Country: Ecuador
- Province: Los Ríos Province
- Canton: Urdaneta Canton

Area
  - Town: 1.13 km^{2} (0.44 sq mi)

Population (2022 census)
  - Town: 7,216
  - Density: 6,390/km^{2} (16,500/sq mi)
- Climate: Aw

Catarama is a town in the Los Ríos Province of Ecuador. It is the seat of the Urdaneta Canton.

== Sources ==
- World-Gazetteer.com
