= Santo Domingo de los Tsáchilas Province =

Province of Ecuador

Santo Domingo de los Tsáchilas
- Province
- Province of Santo Domingo de los Tsáchilas
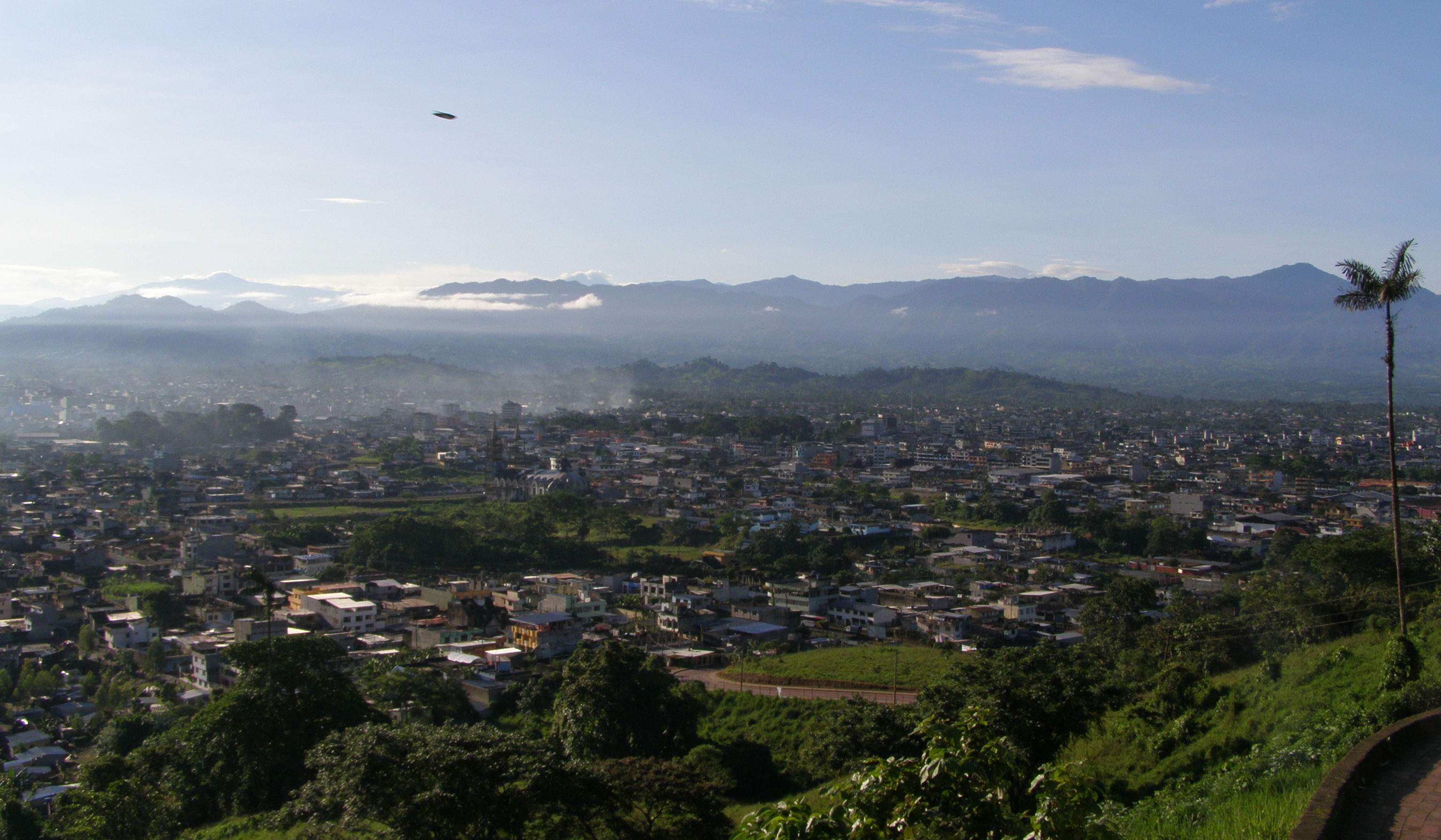

- Flag

- Coordinates: 00°20′S 079°15′W
- Country: Ecuador
- Established: November 6, 2007
- Named for: Tsáchila
- Capital: Santo Domingo
- Cantons: Santo Domingo; La Concordia

Government
  - Prefect: Johana Núñez García (RC)
  - Vice Prefect: Carlos Landaheta
  - Governor: Marco Quezada Ludeña

Area
  - Province: 3,779 km^{2} (1,459 sq mi)

Population (2022 census)
  - Province: 492,969
  - Density: 130.4/km^{2} (337.9/sq mi)
  - Urban: 370,300
- Time zone: UTC-5 (ECT)
- Vehicle registration: J
- HDI (2017): 0.737 high · 9th
- Website: www.gptsachila.gob.ec

Santo Domingo de los Tsáchilas (Spanish pronunciation: [ˌsanto ðoˈmiŋgo ðe los ˈtsatʃilas]) is a province in the Republic of Ecuador, created in October 2007 from territory previously in the province of Pichincha.

== Overview ==
The name of the province refers to a local ethnic group, the Tsáchila, also known as the Colorados on account of the custom of the Tsáchilas (specially men) dyeing their hair with paste made from achiote plants.

The provincial capital is Santo Domingo. With a population of approximately 500,000 inhabitants in 2008, it is the fourth-largest city in Ecuador following Guayaquil, Quito, and Cuenca. Its population is growing rapidly as it has a rich trade and the largest livestock market in the country. It has a surface area of 3,523 square kilometers (1,360 sq mi) and is situated at an altitude of 165 meters (541 ft). Santo Domingo limits are: on the north and east Pichincha, to the northwest Esmeraldas, Manabi on the west, to the south Los Rios and to the southeast with Cotopaxi. Located 133 km west of Quito. Its usual temperature is around 21–33 °C in summer. During the winter, temperatures range around 23–32 °C and sometimes reach 36 °C. Its average temperature is 25.5 °C.

This province is shown as part of the mountainous area of the coast of the western mountains, historically known as the Province of Yumbo and the Hummingbird Capital. Located in the humid tropics of Latin America. On November 26, 2006 a consultation was carried out to determine and promote the status of province to the Central Government and the examiner. The provincialism was held on November 6, 2007. There is a conflict with the province of Esmeraldas in the jurisdiction of the Canton La Concordia.

== Demographics ==
Ethnic groups as of the Ecuadorian census of 2010:

- Mestizo 81.0%
- Afro-Ecuadorian 7.7%
- White 6.8%
- Montubio 2.5%
- Indigenous 1.7%
- Other 0.3%

== Political division ==
When the province was established on November 6, 2007, it consisted of only Santo Domingo canton. The canton of La Concordia was added to the province on May 31, 2013. The city of Santo Domingo is the provincial capital, as well as the seat of Santo Domingo canton.

Canton	Pop. (2001)	Area (km^{2})	Seat/Capital
Santo Domingo	287,018	3,805	Santo Domingo
La Concordia	24,924	325	La Concordia

== See also ==
- Provinces of Ecuador
- Cantons of Ecuador
