= Baba Canton =

Coordinates: 1°47′03″S 79°40′36″W

- Canton
- Location of Los Rios Province in Ecuador.

- Baba Canton in Los Ríos Province
- Country: Ecuador
- Province: Los Ríos Province
- Time zone: UTC-5 (ECT)

Baba Canton is a canton of Ecuador, located in the Los Ríos Province. Its capital is the town of Baba. Its population at the 2001 census was 35,185.

== Demographics ==
Ethnic groups as of the Ecuadorian census of 2010:

- Montubio 66.9%
- Mestizo 26.8%
- Afro-Ecuadorian 4.1%
- White 1.8%
- Indigenous 0.3%
- Other 0.1%
