= Vinces =

- City
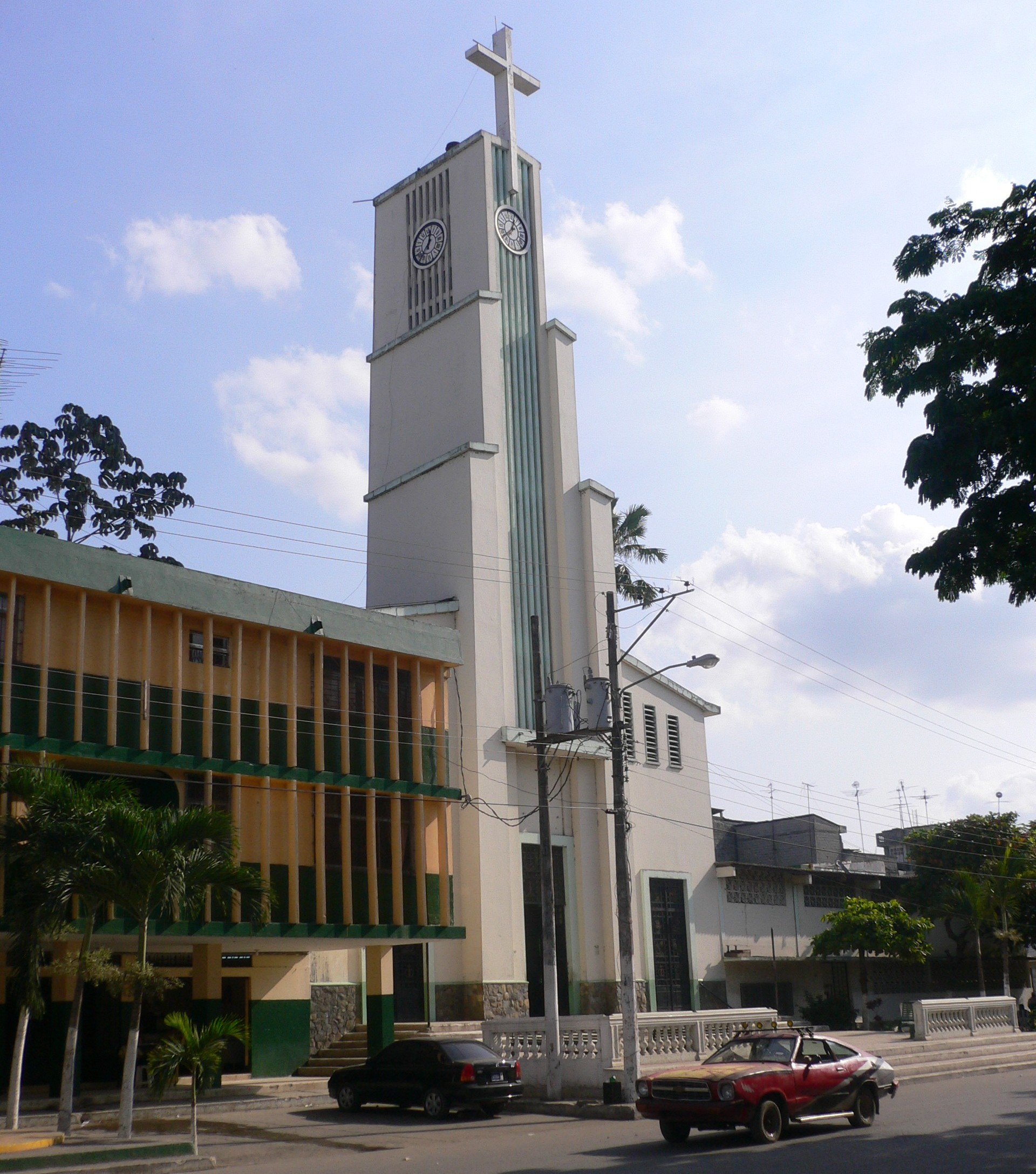

- Flag

- Location within Ecuador
- Coordinates: 1°33′S 79°44′W
- Country: Ecuador
- Province: Los Ríos
- Canton: Vinces
- Founded: June 14, 1845

Government
  - Mayor: Alfonso Montalván Cerezo

Area
  - City: 6.85 km^{2} (2.64 sq mi)
- Elevation: 6 m (20 ft)

Population (Census 2022)
  - City: 35,064
  - Density: 5,120/km^{2} (13,300/sq mi)
- Demonym(s): vinceño, -a
- Climate: Aw
- Website: www.vinces.gob.ec

Vinces is a city in the Los Ríos Province, Ecuador. It is the seat of the Vinces Canton and is located at the Vinces River.

Vinces, known as "Little Paris", is characterized by its ancient buildings, constructed in wood, that belonged to the rich cacao plantation owners.

Vinces is known also as the capital of the competitions of boats to engine outboard in Ecuador.
