= Quevedo, Ecuador =

Quevedo
- City
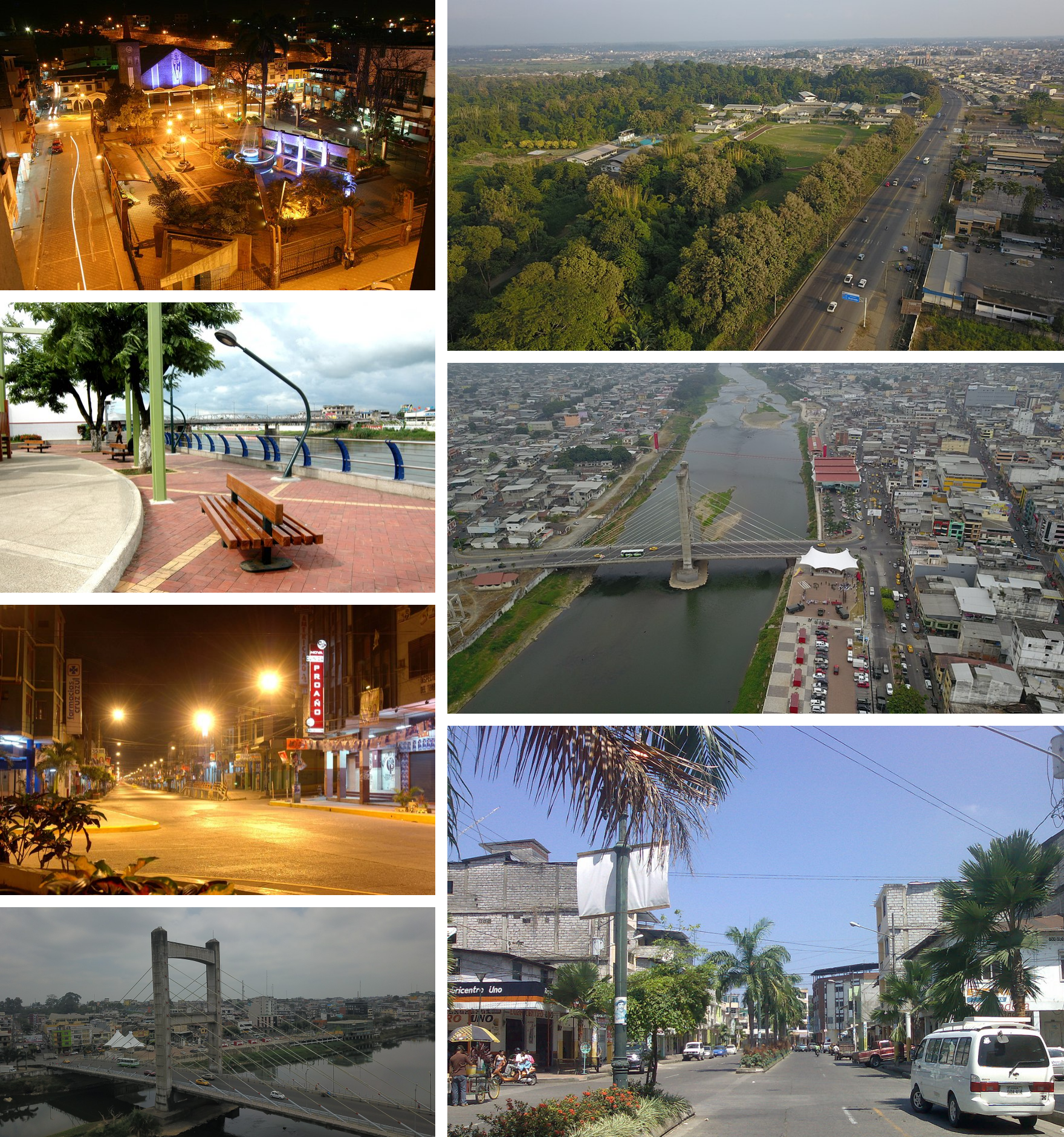
- From top, left to right: Quevedo central park, Quito avenue, Quevedo boardwalk, view of the Quevedo river crossing the city, October 7 avenue, downtown and Humberto Alvarado bridge.

- Flag
- Motto: For Fatherland with Quevedo (Por la Patria y por Quevedo)
- Location within Ecuador
- Coordinates: 1°02′S 79°27′W
- Country: Ecuador
- Province: Los Rios
- Quevedo: Quevedo Canton
- Founded: 1838
- Founder: Jose Camilo Calixtro

Government
  - Mayor: Alexis Matute

Area
  - Total: 34.5 km^{2} (13.3 sq mi)
- Elevation: 74 m (243 ft)

Population (2022 census)
  - Total: 177,792
  - Density: 5,150/km^{2} (13,300/sq mi)
- Time zone: UTC-5 (ECT)
- Area code: 593 5
- Climate: Aw
- Demonym: Quevedeno, -a
- Website: www.quevedo.gob.ec

Quevedo is a city in Ecuador located in the Los Ríos Province. It is the seat of Quevedo Canton, a vibrant community founded in 1943. According to the latest census, Quevedo's population is 177,792. Located at 237 km SW of Quito (Ecuador's capital), or, 183 km NE of Guayaquil (Ecuador's main port). Quevedo is one of the fastest-growing cities in Ecuador and it is mainly known for its agricultural tradition. Quevedo's agroindustrial complex is one of the leading exporters in the world of banana, cacao, passion fruit and coffee bean. In recent years non-agricultural activities have experienced significant progress mainly in the financial and educational sectors.

Though set inland, Quevedo's geographic location makes it an important logistics link between the Pacific coastal area's main population centers like Guayaquil, Santo Domingo and Manta and cities in the Andes highlands such as Ambato and Quito. Because of its location west of the Andes mountains and right next to the Vinces River (a major waterway and tributary to the Pacific Ocean), the city is vulnerable to flooding.

== Economy ==
Quevedo is one of the most important agricultural centers of Ecuador and is the geographical point where all major roads (including the Pan-American highway) in the region intersect. The area surrounding Quevedo mainly produce bananas, corn, rice, and soybeans. The alluvial soils in the region generate excellent harvests year-round. Many banana producers complement their banana plantations with fields that produce corn, soy and rice in the wet season. In the city, this produce is often industrialized into super-market ready products, such as instant-meals, pre-packaged products, noodles and other traditionally Asian foods. In recent years, Quevedo agro-industrial complex has added value to its output by developing a strong presence in the organic product's niche both locally and overseas.

== Geography ==
=== Climate ===
Quevedo has a tropical wet climate, which, coupled with rich volcanic soils, produces excellent conditions for agriculture.

Climate data for Quevedo (Pichilingue), elevation 73 m (240 ft), (1970–2000)
Month	Jan	Feb	Mar	Apr	May	Jun	Jul	Aug	Sep	Oct	Nov	Dec	Year
Mean daily maximum °C (°F)	29.8 (85.6)	30.1 (86.2)	30.7 (87.3)	30.6 (87.1)	29.6 (85.3)	28.0 (82.4)	27.4 (81.3)	28.1 (82.6)	28.9 (84.0)	28.8 (83.8)	29.2 (84.6)	29.8 (85.6)	29.3 (84.7)
Mean daily minimum °C (°F)	21.5 (70.7)	21.8 (71.2)	21.9 (71.4)	21.9 (71.4)	21.6 (70.9)	20.7 (69.3)	19.6 (67.3)	19.5 (67.1)	19.9 (67.8)	20.1 (68.2)	20.4 (68.7)	21.2 (70.2)	20.8 (69.5)
Average precipitation mm (inches)	414.0 (16.30)	433.0 (17.05)	425.0 (16.73)	360.0 (14.17)	138.0 (5.43)	64.0 (2.52)	5.0 (0.20)	12.0 (0.47)	16.0 (0.63)	23.0 (0.91)	34.0 (1.34)	163.0 (6.42)	2,087 (82.17)
Average relative humidity (%)	85	86	87	86	87	88	88	85	81	80	79	80	84
Source: FAO

== Education ==
UTEQ, Universidad Tecnica Estatal de Quevedo, is well known in Ecuador for its program in Agricultural sciences.

== Sports ==
Club Deportivo Quevedo is the local football team which has played in the Ecuadorian top division.

== Culture ==
Mostly populated by the mestizo ethnic group; Quevedo is also known for its prominent Chinese immigrant population and has even been called the "Chinatown of Ecuador". This gives it a distinct reputation and cultural feeling in relation to other Ecuadorian cities. Quevedo is also the center of the "montubio" folklore, a sub-culture that emanates from the customs of the early settlers of the region, who lived in the "monte", a word that describes the agricultural fields.

The city celebrates its foundation on October 7.
