= Los Ríos Province =

Province of Ecuador

Coordinates: 1.76667°S 79.45°W

Los Ríos
- Province
- Province of Los Ríos
- Flag

- Location of Los Rios Province in Ecuador.

- Cantons of Los Ríos Province
- Country: Ecuador
- Created: October 6, 1860.
- Founder: Legislative decree.
- Named for: Large amount of rivers (ríos).
- Capital: Babahoyo
- Largest city: Quevedo
- Cantons: List of Cantons

Government
  - Prefect: Johnny Terán (PSC)
  - Vice Prefect: Mayra Díaz
  - Governor: Javier Buitrón

Area
  - Total: 7,238 km^{2} (2,795 sq mi)

Population (2022 census)
  - Total: 898,652
  - Density: 124.2/km^{2} (321.6/sq mi)
  - Urban: 326,122
  - Population 2001: 668,309
- Time zone: UTC-5 (ECT)
- Vehicle registration: R
- HDI (2017): 0.705 high · 22nd
- Website: www.los-rios.gob.ec

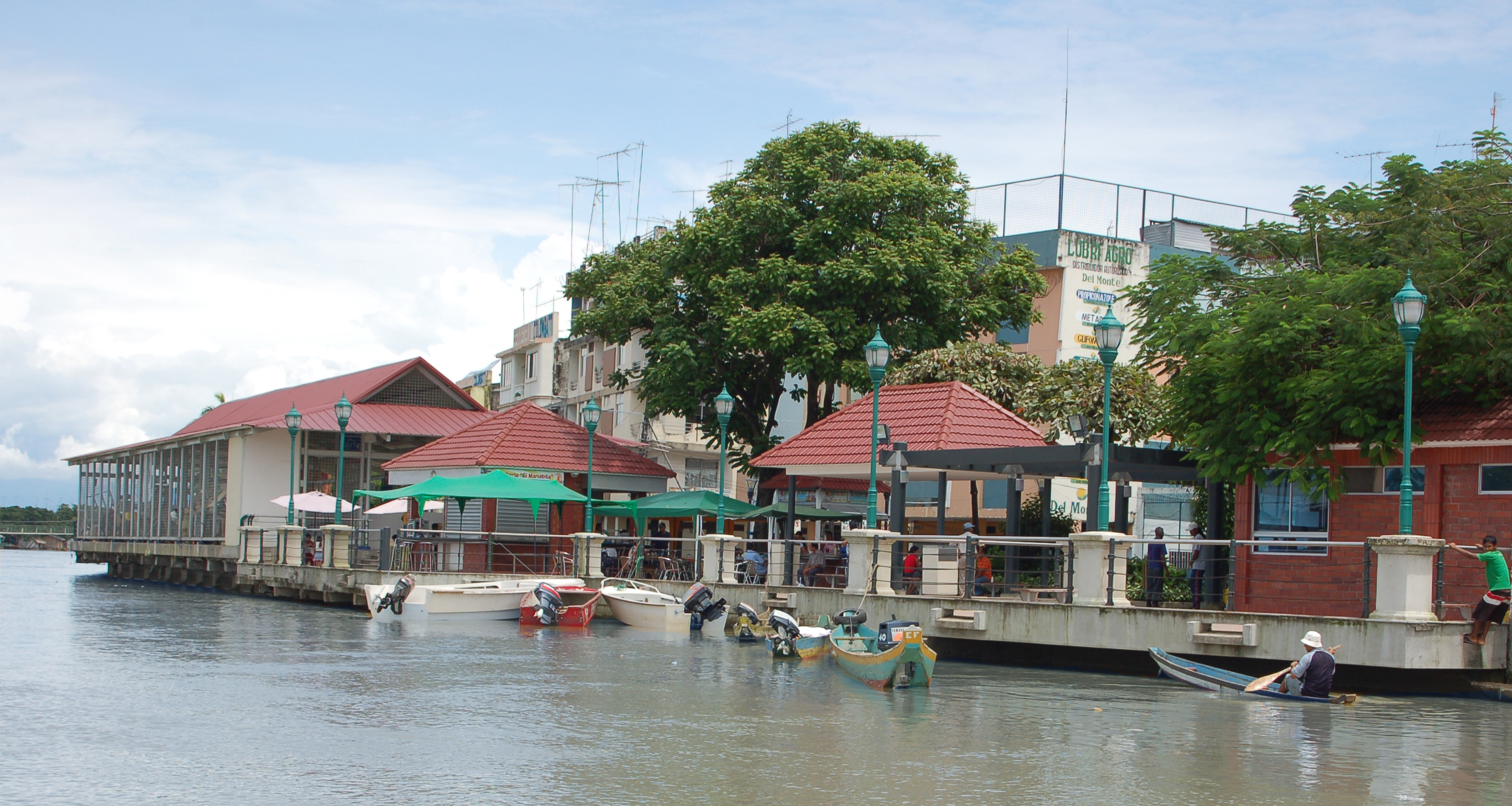
New Muelle Municipal, Babahoyo

Los Ríos (Spanish pronunciation: [los ˈri.os]) is a province in Ecuador. The province's capital is Babahoyo. The province was founded on October 6, 1860. Under legislative decree. Babahoyo was made its capital on September 30, 1948.

== Demographics ==
Ethnic groups as of the Ecuadorian census of 2010:

- Mestizo 52.9%
- Montubio 35.1%
- Afro-Ecuadorian 6.2%
- White 5.0%
- Indigenous 0.6%
- Other 0.3%

== Governance ==
In July 2023, and despite a curfew, four gunmen fired on the home of the Governor of the province, Connie Jiménez.

== Economy ==
The province's economy is largely based on its agriculture: coffee, cacao, bananas, rice, tobacco, etc. Its small industrial sector produces paper, sugar, and wood crafts. Recently developed tourist attractions include fishing and native rituals.

== Cantons ==
The province is divided into 13 cantons. The following table lists each with its population at the time of the 2010 census, its area in square kilometres (km^{2}), and the name of the canton seat or capital.

Canton	Pop. (2010)	Area (km^{2})	Seat/Capital
Baba	39,681	516	Baba
Babahoyo	153,773	1,076	Babahoyo
Buena Fé	63,148	569	San Jacinto de Buena Fe
Mocache	38,392	562	Mocache
Montalvo	24,164	362	Montalvo
Palenque	22,320	570	Palenque
Pueblo Viejo	36,477	338	Puebloviejo
Quevedo	173,575	303	Quevedo
Quinsaloma	16,476	280	Quinsaloma
Urdaneta	29,263	377	Catarama
Valencia	42,556	980	Valencia
Ventanas	71,093	288	Ventanas
Vinces	71,736	693	Vinces

== See also ==
- Provinces of Ecuador
- Cantons of Ecuador
