= Ecuador at beauty pageants =

The first beauty queen in Ecuador was Sara Chacón Zúñiga from Guayaquil, Guayas province in 1930. She wore the sash and the crown of Miss Ecuador for the very first time. The contest was inactive for more than 20 years until 1955 when Leonor Carcache won the first modern title of Miss Ecuador and became the first representative of the country to the Miss Universe pageant.

Representatives from the all 24 provinces that make up Ecuador compete annually for the title of Miss Ecuador among others. In addition to representatives to Miss Universe and Miss International; Miss Ecuador Organization also selects the candidates for Miss United Continents and Reina Hispanoamericana, under the direction of Mrs. María del Carmen de Aguayo. Mr. Julián Pico has the rights to choose and send a contestant to Miss World, Miss Supranational and Miss Grand through the national pageant CNB Ecuador since 2013 under the direction of Mrs. Tahíz Panus. The representatives for Miss Earth is selected by Ms. Katherine Espín. Mr. Rodrigo Moreira has the rights to choose and send a representative from Ecuador to Miss America Latina and Mrs. Cecilia Niemes has the rights to send a delegate to Miss Atlántico Internacional respectively.

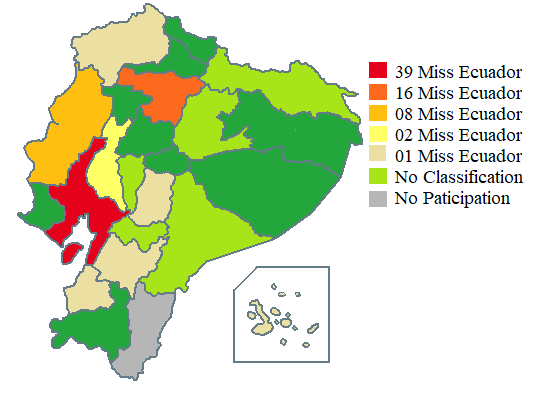
Miss Ecuador winners

== Miss Ecuador titleholders ==
Edition	Date	Venue	Miss Ecuador	Representation	International
1930	February 9, 1930	Teatro Olmedo; Guayaquil, Guayas	Sara Chacón Zúñiga	Guayas: Guayaquil	Miss América Latina 1930
Inactive between 1931—1954
1955	June 4, 1955	Teatro Ponce; Guayaquil, Guayas	Leonor María Carcache Rodríguez	Guayas: Guayaquil	Miss Universe 1955
1956	June 26, 1956	Piscina Olímpica Municipal; Guayaquil, Guayas	María Mercedes Flores Espín	Guayas: Guayaquil	Miss Universe 1956
1957	May 31, 1957	Teatro Olmedo; Guayaquil, Guayas	Patricia Juliana Benítez Wright	Guayas: Guayaquil	Miss Universe 1957
1958	June 20, 1958	Teatro Olmedo; Guayaquil, Guayas	Alicia Vallejo Eljuri	Chimborazo: Riobamba	Miss Universe 1958
1959	July 3, 1959	Teatro Olmedo; Guayaquil, Guayas	Carlota Elena Ayala Arellano	Guayas: Guayaquil	Miss Universe 1959
1960	June 25, 1960	Guayaquil Tennis Club; Guayaquil, Guayas	Isabel Matilde Rolando Ceballos	Pichincha: Quito	Miss Universe 1960
1961	June 29, 1961	Teatro Olmedo; Guayaquil, Guayas	Elaine Nina Ortega Hougen	Pichincha: Quito	Miss International 1961
1961	June 29, 1961	Teatro Olmedo; Guayaquil, Guayas	Elaine Nina Ortega Hougen	Pichincha: Quito	Miss Universe 1962
1961	June 29, 1961	Teatro Olmedo; Guayaquil, Guayas	Elaine Nina Ortega Hougen	Pichincha: Quito	Miss World 1962
1962	August 5, 1962	Club de Leones de Guayaquil; Guayaquil, Guayas	Margarita Leonor Arosemana Gómez	Guayas: Guayaquil	Miss International 1962: Top 15
1963	July 30, 1963	Teatro 9 de Octubre; Guayaquil, Guayas	Tania Valle Moreno	Guayas: Guayaquil	Miss International 1963
1964	July 21, 1964	Teatro 9 de Octubre; Guayaquil, Guayas	María Agustina Mendoza Vélez	Manabí: Santa Ana	Miss International 1964
1965	July 20, 1965	Teatro 9 de Octubre; Guayaquil, Guayas	María Eugenia Mosquéra Bañados	Guayas: Guayaquil	Miss International 1965
1966: Appointed	August 3, 1966	Salón de la Asociación de Periodistas; Guayaquil, Guayas	Alexandra Vallejo Klaere	Guayas: Guayaquil	Miss World 1966
1967: Appointed	October 10, 1966	Canal 4 Studios; Guayaquil, Guayas	Laura Elena Baquero Palacios	Guayas: Guayaquil	Miss Universe 1967: Did not compete
1967: Appointed	October 10, 1966	Canal 4 Studios; Guayaquil, Guayas	Laura Elena Baquero Palacios	Guayas: Guayaquil	Miss International 1967
1967: Appointed	October 10, 1966	Canal 4 Studios; Guayaquil, Guayas	Laura Elena Baquero Palacios	Guayas: Guayaquil	Miss World 1967
1968	June 15, 1968	Guayaquil Yacht Club; Guayaquil, Guayas	Priscilla Elena Álava González	Guayas: Guayaquil	Miss Universe 1968
1969	June 12, 1969	Canal 2 Studios; Guayaquil, Guayas	Rosana Leonor Vinueza Estrada	Guayas: Guayaquil	Miss Universe 1969
1970	July 16, 1970	Canal 2 Studios; Guayaquil, Guayas	Sofía Virginia Monteverde Nimbriotis	Guayas: Guayaquil	Miss World 1970: Top 15
1971	August 19, 1971	Teatro 9 de Octubre; Guayaquil, Guayas	María Cecilia Gómez Buenaventura	Guayas: Guayaquil	Miss World 1971
1972	October 27, 1972	Canal 2 Studios; Guayaquil, Guayas	Patricia Ximena Falconí Salas	Pichincha: Quito	Miss World 1972
1973: Appointed	May 3, 1973	Canal 2 Studios; Guayaquil, Guayas	Ana Patricia Rivadeneira Peña	Azuay: Cuenca	Miss Maja 1973
1974	October 7, 1974	Teatro 9 de Octubre; Guayaquil, Guayas	Silvia Aurora Jurado Estrada	Guayas: Playas	Miss World 1974
1975	July 4, 1975	Teatro 9 de Octubre; Guayaquil, Guayas	Ana María Wray Salas	Guayas: Guayaquil	Miss Universe 1975
1976	June 1, 1976	Canal 2 Studios; Guayaquil, Guayas	Gilda de las Mercedes Plaza Guerra	Guayas: Guayaquil	Miss Universe 1976
1977	June 17, 1977	Coliseo Cerrado de Guayaquil; Guayaquil, Guayas	Lucía del Carmen Hernández Quiñonez	Manabí: Chone	Miss Universe 1977
1977	June 17, 1977	Coliseo Cerrado de Guayaquil; Guayaquil, Guayas	Lucía del Carmen Hernández Quiñonez	Manabí: Chone	Miss World 1977
1978: Appointed	May 8, 1977	Telecentro Studios; Guayaquil, Guayas	Mabel Adelaida Ceballos Sangster	Guayas: Guayaquil	Miss Universe 1978
1979: Appointed	June 9, 1979	Telecentro Studios; Guayaquil, Guayas	Ana Beatriz Plaza Guerra	Guayas: Guayaquil	Miss Universe 1979
1980	June 11, 1980	Teatro 9 de Octubre; Guayaquil, Guayas	Leslie Verónica Rivas Franco	El Oro: Machala	Miss Universe 1980
1981: Appointed	June 2, 1981	Telecentro Studios; Guayaquil, Guayas	Lucía Isabel Vinueza Urgelles^{A}	Guayas: Guayaquil	Miss Universe 1981: Top 12
1981: Appointed	June 2, 1981	Telecentro Studios; Guayaquil, Guayas	Lucía Isabel Vinueza Urgelles^{A}	Guayas: Guayaquil	Miss World 1981
1982: Appointed	June 4, 1982	Telecentro Studios; Guayaquil, Guayas	Lorena Jacqueline Burgos García	Guayas: Guayaquil	Miss Universe 1982
1983	June 14, 1983	Teatro 9 de Octubre; Guayaquil, Guayas	Mariela del Mar García Monsalve^{B}	Manabí: Portoviejo	Miss Universe 1983
1984	May 29, 1984	Teatro 9 de Octubre; Guayaquil, Guayas	Leonor Patricia Gonzenbach Vallejo	Guayas: Guayaquil	Miss Universe 1984
1985	June 4, 1985	Teatro 9 de Octubre; Guayaquil, Guayas	María Elena Stangl Tamayo	Guayas: Guayaquil	Miss Universe 1985
1986	May 27, 1986	Teatro 9 de Octubre; Guayaquil, Guayas	Verónica Lucía Sevilla Ledergeber	Pichincha: Quito	Miss Universe 1986
1987	March 31, 1987	Teatro 9 de Octubre; Guayaquil, Guayas	María del Pilar Barreiro Cucalón	Pichincha: Quito	Miss Universe 1987
1988: Appointed	April 1, 1988	Telecentro Studios; Guayaquil, Guayas	Cecilia Cristina Pozo Carminer	Guayas: Guayaquil	Miss Universe 1988
1989	June 15, 1988	Teatro Centro de Arte; Guayaquil, Guayas	María Eugenia Molina Astudillo	Guayas: Guayaquil	Miss Universe 1989
1990: Appointed	January 8, 1990	Telecentro Studios; Guayaquil, Guayas	Jéssica del Carmen Núñez Severino	Guayas: Guayaquil	Miss Universe 1990
1991	March 12, 1991	Teatro Centro de Arte; Guayaquil, Guayas	Diana Karina Neira Rassmussen	Guayas: Guayaquil	Miss Universe 1991
1992	April 9, 1992	Teatro Centro de Arte; Guayaquil, Guayas	María Soledad Diab Aguilar	Guayas: Guayaquil	Miss Universe 1992
1993	April 22, 1993	Teatro Nacional de la Cultura; Quito, Pichincha	Arianna Mandini Klein	Guayas: Guayaquil	Miss Universe 1993
1994	March 24, 1994	Teatro Centro de Arte; Guayaquil, Guayas	Mafalda del Pilar Arboleda Arditto	Guayas: Guayaquil	Miss Universe 1994
1995: Appointed	March 1, 1955	Ecuavisa Studios; Guayaquil, Guayas	Radmila Miryana Pandžić Arapov	Manabí: Manta	Miss Universe 1995
1996	November 9, 1955	Teatro Bolívar; Quito, Pichincha	Mónica Paulina Chalá Mejía	Pichincha: Quito	Miss Universe 1996
1997	April 17, 1997	Teatro Nacional de la Cultura; Quito, Pichincha	María José López Verdú	Pichincha: Quito	Miss Universe 1997
1998	March 21, 1988	Teatro Nacional de la Cultura; Quito, Pichincha	Soraya Edith Hogonaga Serrano^{C}	Pichincha: Quito	Miss Universe 1998
1999	April 16, 1999	Teatro Nacional de la Cultura; Quito, Pichincha	Carolina Alfonso De la Paz	Pichincha: Quito	Miss Universe 1999
2000	April 6, 2000	Teatro Centro de Arte; Guayaquil, Guayas	Gabriela Mercedes Cadena Vedova	Guayas: Guayaquil	Miss Universe 2000
2001	March 21, 2001	Teatro Nacional de la Cultura; Quito, Pichincha	Jéssica Eliana Bermúdez Ronquillo	Guayas: Guayaquil	Miss Universe 2001
2002	March 26, 2002	Teatro Centro de Arte; Guayaquil, Guayas	Isabel Cristina Ontaneda Pinto^{D}	Pichincha: Quito	Miss Universe 2002
2002	March 26, 2002	Teatro Centro de Arte; Guayaquil, Guayas	Isabel Cristina Ontaneda Pinto^{D}	Pichincha: Quito	Miss International 2002
2002	March 26, 2002	Teatro Centro de Arte; Guayaquil, Guayas	Isabel Cristina Ontaneda Pinto^{D}	Pichincha: Quito	Miss Earth 2003
2003	March 27, 2003	Teatro Nacional de la Cultura; Quito, Pichincha	Andrea Marcela Jácome Ruíz	Guayas: Guayaquil	Miss Universe 2003
2004	March 4, 2004	Teatro Centro de Arte; Guayaquil, Guayas	María Susana Rivadeneira Simbal	Pichincha: Quito	Miss Universe 2004: Top 10
2005	March 12, 2005	Teatro Nacional de la Cultura; Quito, Pichincha	Laura Ximena Zamora Moreano	Pichincha: Quito	Miss Universe 2005
2006	March 16, 2006	Coliseo Mayor de Cuenca; Cuenca, Azuay	Catalina "Catty" Mercedes López Samán	Guayas: Guayaquil	Miss Universe 2006
2007	March 22, 2007	Coliseo Voltaire Paladines Polo; Guayaquil, Guayas	María Lugina Cabezas Andrade	Pichincha: Quito	Miss Universe 2007
2008	March 18, 2008	Centro de Convenciones CEMEXPO; Quito, Pichincha	Doménica Francesca Saporiti Hinojosa	Guayas: Guayaquil	Miss Universe 2008
2009	March 13, 2009	Coliseo Lorgio Pinargote; Manta, Manabí	Sandra María Vinces Pinargote	Manabí: Portoviejo	Miss Universe 2009
2010	March 25, 2010	Centro de Convenciones CEMEXPO; Quito, Pichincha	Lady Fernanda Mina Lastra	Guayas: Guayaquil	Miss Universe 2010
2011	March 17, 2011	Recinto Ferial Alfonso Torres Ordóñez; Santo Domingo, Santo Domingo	Claudia Elena Schiess Fretz^{E}	Galápagos: Puerto Ayora	Miss Universe 2011
2012	March 16, 2012	Puerto Lucía Yacht Club; La Libertad, Santa Elena	Andrea Carolina Aguirre Pérez	Guayas: Guayaquil	Miss Universe 2012
2013	March 8, 2013	Teatro Centro Cívico; Guayaquil, Guayas	Constanza María Báez Jalil	Pichincha: Quito	Miss Universe 2013: 2nd Runner-up
2014	March 15, 2014	Teatro Centro Cívico; Guayaquil, Guayas	Silvia Alejandra Argudo Intriago	Manabí: Portoviejo	Miss Universe 2014
2015	March 4, 2015	Centro de Convenciones de Guayaquil; Guayaquil, Guayas	Francesca Keyco Cipriani Burgos	Guayas: Guayaquil	Miss Universe 2015
2016	March 12, 2016	Hotel Oro Verde; Machala, El Oro	Connie Maily Jiménez Romero	Los Ríos: Ventanas	Miss Universe 2016
2017	April 22, 2017	Complejo Polideportivo El Chorrillo; Babahoyo, Los Ríos	María Daniela Cepeda Matamoros	Guayas: Guayaquil	Miss Universe 2017
2018	May 5, 2018	Hotel Oro Verde; Machala, El Oro	Virginia Stephanie Limongi Silva	Manabí: Portoviejo	Miss Universe 2018
2019	July 19, 2019	Teatro Centro de Arte; Guayaquil, Guayas	Cristina María Hidalgo Berry	Guayas: Guayaquil	Miss Universe 2019
2020	October 17, 2020	Hotel Wyndham Sail; Manta, Manabí	Leyla Shuken Espinoza Calvache	Los Ríos: Quevedo	Miss Universe 2020
2021	September 11, 2021	Malecón Eloy Alfaro; Quevedo, Los Ríos	Susana "Susy" Valeria Sacoto Mendoza	Manabí: Portoviejo	Miss Universe 2021
2022	September 3, 2022	Malecón Eloy Alfaro; Quevedo, Los Ríos	Nayelhi Alejandra González Ulloa	Esmeraldas: Esmeraldas	Miss Universe 2022
2023	July 1, 2023	Recinto Ferial Alfonso Torres Ordóñez; Santo Domingo, Santo Domingo	Delary Georgette Stoffers Villón	Guayas: Guayaquil	Miss Universe 2023
2024	August 17, 2024	Salinas Golf & Tennis Club; Salinas, Santa Elena	Eunices Alexandra Rivadeneira Bermeo	Guayas: Guayaquil	Miss International 2025; TBD

A.Lucía Vinueza was born in Cuenca, Azuay; but she represented the province of Guayas.
B.Mariela García was born in Cuenca, Azuay; but she represented the province of Manabí.
C.Soraya Hogonaga was born in Milagro, Guayas; but she represented the province of Pichincha.
D.Isabel Ontaneda was born in Cuenca, Azuay; but she represented the province of Pichincha.
E.Claudia Schiess was born abroad, in Basel, Switzerland; but she represented the province of Galápagos.

=== Provincial rankings ===
Province	Titles	Years
Guayas	41	1955, 1956, 1957, 1959, 1962, 1963, 1965, 1966, 1967, 1968, 1969, 1970, 1971, 1974, 1975, 1976, 1978, 1979, 1981, 1982, 1984, 1985, 1988, 1989, 1990, 1991, 1992, 1993, 1994, 2000, 2001, 2003, 2006, 2008, 2010, 2012, 2015, 2017, 2019, 2023, 2024
Pichincha	14	1960, 1961, 1972, 1986, 1987, 1996, 1997, 1998, 1999, 2002, 2004, 2005, 2007, 2013
Manabí	08	1964, 1977, 1983, 1995, 2009, 2014, 2018, 2021
Los Ríos	02	2016, 2020
Chimborazo	01	1958
Azuay	01	1973
El Oro	01	1980
Galápagos	01	2011
Esmeraldas	01	2022

== Miss Universe participation ==
Edition	Selection	Miss Universe Ecuador	Representation	Placement	Awards
Did not compete between 1952—1954
1955	Miss Ecuador 1955: Winner	Leonor María Carcache Rodríguez	Guayas: Guayaquil	Unplaced	None
1956	Miss Ecuador 1956: Winner	María Mercedes Flores Espín	Guayas: Guayaquil	Unplaced	None
1957	Miss Ecuador 1957: Winner	Patricia Juliana Benítez Wright	Guayas: Guayaquil	Unplaced	None
1958	Miss Ecuador 1958: Winner	Alicia Vallejo Eljuri	Chimborazo: Riobamba	Unplaced	None
1959	Miss Ecuador 1959: Winner	Carlota Elena Ayala Arellano	Guayas: Guayaquil	Unplaced	None
1960	Miss Ecuador 1960: Winner	Isabel Matilde Rolando Ceballos	Pichincha: Quito	Unplaced	None
1961	Reina del Ecuador 1961: Winner	Yolanda Palacios Chavert	Guayas: Guayaquil	Unplaced	None
1962	Miss Ecuador 1961: Winner	Elaine Nina Ortega Hougen	Pichincha: Quito	Unplaced	None
1963	Reina Nacional del Tejido 1963: Winner	Patricia Córdova Martínez	Azuay: Cuenca	Unplaced	None
1964	Reina del Salinas Yacht Club 1964: Winner	Tanya Yela Klein Loffredo	Guayas: Guayaquil	Unplaced	None
1965	Reina del Ecuador 1965: Winner	Patricia Susana Ballasteros	Guayas: Guayaquil	Unplaced	None
1966	Miss Ecuador Universo 1966: Winner	Martha Cecilia Andrade Alomina	Pichincha: Quito	Unplaced	None
1967	Miss Ecuador 1967: Winner	Laura Elena Baquero Palacios	Guayas: Guayaquil	Did not compete	Did not compete
1968	Miss Ecuador 1968: Winner	Priscilla Elena Álava González	Guayas: Guayaquil	Unplaced	None
1969	Miss Ecuador 1969: Winner	Rosana Leonor Vinueza Estrada	Guayas: Guayaquil	Unplaced	None
1970	Perla del Pacífico del Ecuador 1970: Winner	Sonia Zoila Montesinos Rivera	Manabí: Jipijapa	Unplaced	None
1971	Miss Ecuador Universo 1971: Winner	Ximena Moreno Ochoa	Pichincha: Quito	Unplaced	None
1972	Miss Ecuador Universo 1972: Winner	María Susana Castro Jaramillo	Pichincha: Quito	Unplaced	None
Did not compete between 1973 - 1974
1975	Miss Ecuador 1975: Winner	Ana María Wray Salas	Guayas: Guayaquil	Unplaced	None
1976	Miss Ecuador 1976: Winner	Gilda de las Mercedes Plaza Guerra	Guayas: Guayaquil	Unplaced	None
1977	Miss Ecuador 1977: Winner	Lucía del Carmen Hernández Quiñonez	Manabí: Chone	Unplaced	None
1978	Miss Ecuador 1978: Winner	Mabel Adelaida Ceballos Sangster	Guayas: Guayaquil	Unplaced	None
1979	Miss Ecuador 1979: Winner	Ana Beatriz Plaza Guerra	Guayas: Guayaquil	Unplaced	None
1980	Miss Ecuador 1980: Winner	Leslie Verónica Rivas Franco	El Oro: Machala	Unplaced	None
1981	Miss Ecuador 1981: Winner	Lucía Isabel Vinueza Urgelles^{A}	Guayas: Guayaquil	Top 12	None
1982	Miss Ecuador 1982: Winner	Lorena Jacqueline Burgos García	Guayas: Guayaquil	Unplaced	None
1983	Miss Ecuador 1983: Winner	Mariela del Mar García Monsalve^{B}	Manabí: Portoviejo	Unplaced	None
1984	Miss Ecuador 1984: Winner	Leonor Patricia Gonzenbach Vallejo	Guayas: Guayaquil	Unplaced	None
1985	Miss Ecuador 1985: Winner	María Elena Stangl Tamayo	Guayas: Guayaquil	Unplaced	None
1986	Miss Ecuador 1986: Winner	Verónica Lucía Sevilla Ledergeber	Pichincha: Quito	Unplaced	None
1987	Miss Ecuador 1987: Winner	María del Pilar Barreiro Cucalón	Pichincha: Quito	Unplaced	None
1988	Miss Ecuador 1988: Winner	Cecilia Cristina Pozo Carminer	Guayas: Guayaquil	Unplaced	None
1989	Miss Ecuador 1989: Winner	María Eugenia Molina Astudillo	Guayas: Guayaquil	Unplaced	None
1990	Miss Ecuador 1990: Winner	Jéssica del Carmen Núñez Severino	Guayas: Guayaquil	Unplaced	None
1991	Miss Ecuador 1991: Winner	Diana Karina Neira Rassmussen	Guayas: Guayaquil	Unplaced	None
1992	Miss Ecuador 1992: Winner	María Soledad Diab Aguilar	Guayas: Guayaquil	Unplaced	Miss Photogenic
1993	Miss Ecuador 1993: Winner	Arianna Mandini Klein	Guayas: Guayaquil	Unplaced	None
1994	Miss Ecuador 1994: Winner	Mafalda del Pilar Arboleda Arditto	Guayas: Guayaquil	Unplaced	None
1995	Miss Ecuador 1995: Winner	Radmila Miryana Pandžić Arapov	Manabí: Manta	Unplaced	None
1996	Miss Ecuador 1996: Winner	Mónica Paulina Chalá Mejía	Pichincha: Quito	Unplaced	None
1997	Miss Ecuador 1997: Winner	María José López Verdú	Pichincha: Quito	Unplaced	None
1998	Miss Ecuador 1998: Winner	Soraya Edith Hogonaga Serrano^{C}	Pichincha: Quito	Unplaced	None
1999	Miss Ecuador 1999: Winner	Carolina Alfonso De la Paz	Pichincha	Unplaced	None
2000	Miss Ecuador 2000: Winner	Gabriela Mercedes Cadena Vedova	Guayas: Guayaquil	Unplaced	None
2001	Miss Ecuador 2001: Winner	Jéssica Eliana Bermúdez Ronquillo	Guayas: Guayaquil	Unplaced	None
2002	Miss Ecuador 2002: Winner	Isabel Cristina Ontaneda Pinto^{D}	Pichincha: Quito	Unplaced	None
2003	Miss Ecuador 2003: Winner	Andrea Marcela Jácome Ruíz	Guayas: Guayaquil	Unplaced	None
2004	Miss Ecuador 2004: Winner	María Susana Rivadeneira Simbal	Pichincha: Quito	Top 10	Best in National Costume; Top 10
2005	Miss Ecuador 2005: Winner	Laura Ximena Zamora Moreano	Pichincha: Quito	Unplaced	None
2006	Miss Ecuador 2006: Winner	Catalina "Katty" Mercedes López Samán	Guayas: Guayaquil	Unplaced	None
2007	Miss Ecuador 2007: Winner	María Lugina Cabezas Andrade	Pichincha: Quito	Unplaced	None
2008	Miss Ecuador 2008: Winner	Doménica Francesca Saporiti Hinojosa	Guayas: Guayaquil	Unplaced	None
2009	Miss Ecuador 2009: Winner	Sandra María Vinces Pinargote	Manabí: Portoviejo	Unplaced	Best in National Costume; 3rd Place
2010	Miss Ecuador 2010: Winner	Lady Fernanda Mina Lastra	Guayas: Guayaquil	Unplaced	None
2011	Miss Ecuador 2011: Winner	Claudia Elena Schiess Fretz^{E}	Galápagos: Puerto Ayora	Unplaced	None
2012	Miss Ecuador 2012: Winner	Andrea Carolina Aguirre Pérez	Guayas: Guayaquil	Unplaced	None
2013	Miss Ecuador 2013: Winner	Constanza María Báez Jalil	Pichincha: Quito	2nd Runner-up	None
2014	Miss Ecuador 2014: Winner	Silvia Alejandra Argudo Intriago	Manabí: Portoviejo	Unplaced	None
2015	Miss Ecuador 2015: Winner	Francesca Keyco Cipriani Burgos	Guayas: Guayaquil	Unplaced	None
2016	Miss Ecuador 2016: Winer	Connie Maily Jiménez Romero	Los Ríos: Ventanas	Unplaced	None
2017	Miss Ecuador 2017: Winner	María Daniela Cepeda Matamoros	Guayas: Guayaquil	Unplaced	None
2018	Miss Ecuador 2018: Winner	Virginia Stephanie Limongi Silva	Manabí: Portoviejo	Unplaced	None
2019	Miss Ecuador 2019: Winner	Cristina María Hidalgo Berry	Guayas: Guayaquil	Unplaced	None
2020	Miss Ecuador 2020: Winner	Leyla Shuken Espinoza Calvache	Los Ríos: Quevedo	Unplaced	None
2021	Miss Ecuador 2021: Winner	Susana "Susy" Valeria Sacoto Mendoza	Manabí: Portoviejo	Unplaced	None
2022	Miss Ecuador 2022: Winner	Nayelhi Alejandra González Ulloa	Esmeraldas: Esmeraldas	Unplaced	None
2023	Miss Ecuador 2023: Winner	Delary Georgette Stoffers Villón	Guayas: Guayaquil	Unplaced	None
2024	Miss Universe Ecuador 2024: Winner	Mara Štefica Topić Verduga	Guayas: Guayaquil	Top 30	None

A.Lucía Vinueza was born in Cuenca, Azuay; but she represented the province of Guayas.
B.Mariela García was born in Cuenca, Azuay; but she represented the province of Manabí.
C.Soraya Hogonaga was born in Milagro, Guayas; but she represented the province of Pichincha.
D.Isabel Ontaneda was born in Cuenca, Azuay; but she represented the province of Pichincha.
E.Claudia Schiess was born abroad, in Basel, Switzerland; but she represented the province of Galápagos.

=== Provincial rankings ===
Province	Titles	Years
Guayas	37	1955, 1956, 1957, 1959, 1961, 1964, 1965, 1967^{a}, 1968, 1969, 1975, 1976, 1978, 1979, 1981, 1982, 1984, 1985, 1988, 1989, 1990, 1991, 1992, 1993, 1994, 2000, 2001, 2003, 2006, 2008, 2010, 2012, 2015, 2017, 2019, 2023, 2024
Pichincha	16	1960, 1962, 1966, 1971, 1972, 1986, 1987, 1996, 1997, 1998, 1999, 2002, 2004, 2005, 2007, 2013
Manabí	08	1970, 1977, 1983, 1995, 2009, 2014, 2018, 2021
Los Ríos	02	2016, 2020
Chimborazo	01	1958
Azuay	01	1963
El Oro	01	1980
Galápagos	01	2011
Esmeraldas	01	2022

a.Laura Baquero from Guayas was Miss Ecuador 1967 and had the rights to compete at Miss Universe 1967, but she was not allow to compete due to she was under 18 years of age.

== Miss World participation ==
Edition	Selection	Miss World Ecuador	Representation	Placement	Awards
Did not compete between 1951—1959
1960	Reina del Ecuador 1960: Winner	María Rosa Rodríguez Vásconez	Guayas: Guayaquil	Unplaced	None
1961	Reina del Ecuador 1961: 1st Runner-up	Magdalena Dávila Varela	Pichincha: Quito	Unplaced	None
1962	Miss Ecuador 1961: Winner	Elaine Nina Ortega Hougen	Pichincha: Quito	Unplaced	None
Did not compete in 1963
1964	Reina del Club de Leones 1964: Winner	María de Lourdes Anda Vallejo	Guayas: Guayaquil	Unplaced	None
1965	Casting: Appointed	Corine Mildred Corral	Pichincha: Quito	Unplaced	None
1966	Miss Ecuador 1966: Winner	Alexandra Vallejo Klaere	Guayas: Guayaquil	Unplaced	None
1967	Miss Ecuador 1967: Winner	Laura Elena Baquero Palacios	Guayas: Guayaquil	Unplaced	None
1968	Casting: Appointed	Marcia Virginia Ramos Christiansen	Guayas: Guayaquil	Unplaced	None
1969	Miss Ecuador 1969: 1st Runner-up	Ximena Lourdes Aulestia Díaz	Pichincha: Quito	Unplaced	None
1970	Miss Ecuador 1970: Winner	Sofía Virginia Monteverde Nimbriotis	Guayas: Guayaquil	Top 15	None
1971	Miss Ecuador 1971: Winner	María Cecilia Gómez Buenaventura	Guayas: Guayaquil	Unplaced	None
1972	Miss Ecuador 1972: Winner	Patricia Ximena Falconí Orozco	Pichincha: Quito	Unplaced	None
Did not compete in 1973
1974	Miss Ecuador 1974: Winner	Silvia Aurora Jurado Estrada	Guayas: Playas	Unplaced	None
Did not compete in 1975
1976	Casting: Appointed	Marie Clare Fontaine Velasco	Guayas: Guayaquil	Unplaced	None
1977	Miss Ecuador 1977: Winner	Lucía del Carmen Hernández Quiñónez	Manabí: Chone	Unplaced	None
1978	Casting: Appointed	Antonieta Cecilia Campodónico Aguirre	Guayas: Guayaquil	Unplaced	None
1979	Casting: Appointed	Olga Lourdes Padilla Guevara	Guayas: Guayaquil	Unplaced	None
1980	Casting: Appointed	Gabriela María Catalina Ríos Roca	Guayas: Guayaquil	Unplaced	None
1981	Miss Ecuador 1981: Winner	Lucía Isabel Vinueza Urgelles	Guayas: Guayaquil	Unplaced	None
1982	Casting: Appointed	Gianna Macchiavello González	Guayas: Guayaquil	Unplaced	None
1983	Miss Ecuador 1983: 1st Runner-up	Martha Isabel Lascano Salcedo	Guayas: Guayaquil	Unplaced	None
1984	Miss Ecuador 1984: 1st Runner-up	María Sol Corral Zambrano	Azuay: Cuenca	Unplaced	None
1985	Miss Ecuador 1985: 1st Runner-up	María del Pilar De Veintemilla Russo	Pichincha: Quito	Unplaced	None
1986	Miss Ecuador 1986: 1st Runner-up	Alicia Guisella Cucalón Macías	Guayas: Guayaquil	6th Runner-up	None
1987	Miss Ecuador 1987: 1st Runner-up	Cecilia Cristina Pozo Caminer	Guayas: Guayaquil	Unplaced	None
1988	Miss Ecuador 1989: 1st Runner-up	Cristina Elena López Villagómez	Guayas: Guayaquil	Unplaced	None
1989	Casting: Appointed	Ximena Paulett Correa Jarre	El Oro: Machala	Unplaced	None
Did not compete in 1990
1991	Miss Mundo Ecuador 1991: Winner	Suanny Denise Bejarano López	Guayas: Guayaquil	Unplaced	None
1992	Miss Mundo Ecuador 1992: Winner	Stephanie Krumholz De Meneses	Guayas: Guayaquil	Unplaced	None
1993	Casting: Appointed	Danna Saab Saab	Guayas: Guayaquil	Unplaced	None
1994	Casting: Appointed	Diana Margarita Noboa Gordon	Guayas: Guayaquil	Unplaced	None
1995	Casting: Appointed	Ana Fabiola Trujíllo Parker	Guayas: Guayaquil	Unplaced	None
1996	Casting: Appointed	Karina de Lourdes Guerra Manzo	Guayas: Guayaquil	Resigned	Resigned
1996	Casting: Appointed	Jennifer Lynn Graham Dumani	Guayas: Guayaquil	Unplaced	None
1997	Miss Ecuador 1997: Conestant	Clío Minoska Olaya Frías	Esmeraldas: Esmeraldas	Unplaced	None
1998	Miss Ecuador 1998: 1st Runner-up	Vanessa Natalia Graf Alvear	Guayas: Guayaquil	Unplaced	None
1999	Miss Ecuador 1999: 1st Runner-up	Sofía Morán Trueba	Manabí: Manta	Unplaced	None
2000	Miss Ecuador 2000: 1st Runner-up	Ana Dolores Murillo Sánchez	Manabí: Portoviejo	Unplaced	None
2001	Miss Ecuador 2001: 1st Runner-up	Carla Lorena Revelo Pérez	Pichincha: Quito	Unplaced	None
2002	Miss Ecuador 2002: 1st Runner-up	Jéssica Leonela Angulo Miranda^{A}	Pichincha: Santo Domingo	Unplaced	None
2003	Miss Ecuador 2003: 1st Runner-up	Mayra Katty Rentería Matamba	Esmeraldas: Esmeraldas	Unplaced	None
2004	Miss Ecuador 2004: 1st Runner-up	Cristina Eugenia Reyes Hidalgo	Guayas: Guayaquil	Unplaced	Beauty Beach; Top 10; Talent; Top 20
2005	Miss Ecuador 2005: 1st Runner-up	Marielisa Márquez Gutiérrez	Guayas: Guayaquil	Unplaced	None
2006	Miss Ecuador 2006: 1st Runner-up	María Rebeca Flores Jaramillo	Azuay: Cuenca	Unplaced	None
2007	Miss Ecuador 2007: 1st Runner-up	Valeska Alexandra Saab Gómez	Guayas: Guayaquil	Top 16	Beauty With A Purpose; Winner
2008	Miss Ecuador 2008: 1st Runner-up	Marjorie Alexandra Cevallos Vera	Guayas: Durán	Unplaced	None
2009	Miss Ecuador 2009: 1st Runner-up	María Gabriela Ulloa Quiñones	Esmeraldas: Esmeraldas	Unplaced	None
2010	Miss Ecuador 2010: 1st Runner-up	Ana Mercedes Galarza Añazco	Tungurahua: Ambato	Unplaced	Talent; Top 21
2011	Miss Ecuador 2011: 1st Runner-up	María Verónica Vargas Granja	Guayas: Guayaquil	Unplaced	Beauty With A Purpose; Top 10
2012	Miss Ecuador 2012: 1st Runner-up	Cipriana Denisse Correia Macías^{B}	Esmeraldas: Esmeraldas	Unplaced	None
2013	Miss World Ecuador 2013: Winner	Laritza Libeth Párraga Arteaga	Santo Domingo: Santo Domingo	Unplaced	Beauty Beach; Top 32
2014	Miss World Ecuador 2014: Winner	Virginia Stephanie Limongi Silva	Manabí: Portoviejo	Unplaced	Sportswoman; Top 32
2015	Miss World Ecuador 2015: Winner	María Camila Marañón Solórzano	Manabí: Chone	Top 21	Beauty With A Purpose; Top 10
2016	Miss World Ecuador 2016: Winner	Mirka Paola Cabrera Mazzini	El Oro: Machala	Unplaced	Talent; Top 21
2017	Miss World Ecuador 2017: winner	Romina Zeballos Avellán	Guayas: Guayaquil	Unplaced	None
2018	Miss World Ecuador 2018: Winner	Shirley Nicol Ocles Congo	Imbabura: Pimampiro	Unplaced	Sportswoman; Top 18
2019	Miss World Ecuador 2019: Winner	María Auxiliadora Idrovo Quintana	Guayas: Playas	Unplaced	None
No pageant was held in 2020 due to COVID-19 pandemic
2021	CNB Ecuador 2020: Winner	Ámar Silvana Pacheco Ibarra	Guayas: Guayaquil	Top 40	Beauty With A Porpouse; Top 28; Talent; Top 27
No pageant was held in 2022 due to the delay of the 2021 pageant
2023	CNB Ecuador 2022: Winner	Annie Cecilia Zambrano Campoverde	Santa Elena: Salinas	Unplaced	Unplaced
No pageant will be held in 2024 due to the delay of the 2023 pageant
2025	CNB Ecuador 2023: Winner	Sandra Mariela Alvarado Cobeña	Santo Domingo: Santo Domingo	TBA	TBA

A.Jéssica Angulo represented Pichincha since Santo Domingo was not a province until 2008.
B.Ciprina Correia resigned the title after competing internationally. Nobody took the title over.

=== Provincial rankings ===
Province	Titles	Years
Guayas	33	1960, 1964, 1966, 1967, 1968, 1970, 1971, 1974, 1976, 1878, 1979, 1980, 1981, 1982, 1983, 1986, 1987, 1988, 1991, 1992, 1993, 1994, 1995, 1996^{a}, 1998, 2004, 2005, 2007, 2008, 2011, 2017, 2019, 2021
Pichincha	08	1961, 1962, 1965, 1969, 1972, 1985, 2001, 2002^{b}
Manabí	05	1977, 1999, 2000, 2014, 2015
Esmeraldas	04	1997, 2003, 2009, 2012
Azuay	02	1984, 2006
El Oro	02	1989, 2016
Santo Domingo	02	2013, 2023
Tungurahua	01	2010
Imbabura	01	2018
Santa Elena	01	2022

a.Karina Guerra from Guayas was appointed as Miss World Ecuador 1996, but she resigned. Jennifer Graham from Guayas was appointed to take over the title as the Ecuadorian representative to Miss World 1996.
b.Jéssica Angulo represented Pichincha since Santo Domingo was not a province until 2008.

== Miss International participation ==
Edition	Selection	Miss International Ecuador	Representation	Placement	Awards
1960	Casting: Appointed	Magdalena Dávila Varela	Pichincha: Quito	Unplaced	None
1961	Miss Ecuador 1961: Winner	Elaine Nina Ortega Hougen	Pichincha: Quito	Unplaced	None
1962	Miss Ecuador 1962: Winner	Margarita Leonor Arosemena Gómez	Guayas: Guayaquil	Top 15	None
1963	Miss Ecuador 1963: Winner	Tania Valle Moreno	Guayas: Guayaquil	Unplaced	None
1964	Miss Ecuador 1964: Winner	María Agustina Mendoza Veléz	Manabí: Santa Ana	Unplaced	None
1965	Miss Ecuador 1965: Winner	María Eugenia Mosquera Bañados	Guayas: Guayaquil	Unplaced	None
No pageant was held in 1966
1967	Miss Ecuador 1967: Winner	Laura Elena Baquero Palacios	Guayas: Guayaquil	Unplaced	None
1968	Casting: Appointed	Enriqueta Valdéz Fuentes	Guayas: Guayaquil	Unplaced	None
1969	Miss Ecuador 1969: 2nd Runner-up	Alexandra Swanberg Viteri	Guayas: Guayaquil	Unplaced	None
1970	Casting: Appointed	Lourdes Hernández	Pichincha: Quito	Top 15	None
1971	Casting: Appointed	María Susana Castro Jaramillo	Pichincha: Quito	Unplaced	None
1972	Miss Belleza Internacional Ecuador 1972: Winner	Lucía del Carmen Fernández Avellaneda	Manabí: Manta	Unplaced	None
Did not compete between 1973—2001
2002	Miss Ecuador 2002: Winner	Isabel Cristina Ontaneda Pinto	Pichincha: Quito	Unplaced	None
Did not compete in 2003
2004	Miss Ecuador 2004: 3rd Runner-up	Irene Andrea Zunino García	Guayas: Guayaquil	Unplaced	None
2005	Miss Ecuador 2005: 2nd Runner-up	Bianca María Salame Avilés	Guayas: Guayaquil	Unplaced	None
2006	Miss Ecuador 2006: 2nd Runner-up	Denisse Elizabeth Rodriguez Quiñónez	Pichincha: Quito	Unplaced	None
2007	Miss Ecuador 2007: 2nd Runner-up	Jéssica Maena Ortíz Campos	Esmeraldas: Esmeraldas	Unplaced	None
2008	Miss Ecuador 2008: 2nd Runner-up	Jennifer Stephannie Pazmiño Saldaña	Guayas: Guayaquil	Top 12	None
2009	Miss Ecuador 2009: 2nd Runner-up	Isabella Chiriboga Valdivieso	Pichincha: Quito	Unplaced	None
2010	Miss Ecuador 2010: 2nd Runner-up	Andrea Ivonne Suárez Melgar	Loja: Loja	Unplaced	None
2011	Miss Ecuador 2011: 2nd Runner-up	María Fernanda Cornejo Alfaro	Pichincha: Quito	Miss International 2011	Miss Beauty; Winner; Miss Figure; Winner
2012	Miss Ecuador 2012: 2nd Runner-up	Tatiana Katherine Loor Hidalgo ^{B}	Santo Domingo: Santo Domingo	Unplaced	None
2013	Miss Ecuador 2013: 1st Runner-up	Nathaly Arroba Hurtado	Guayas: Guayaquil	Top 15	None
2014	Miss Ecuador 2014: 2nd Runner-up	Carla Daniela Pardo Thoret	Santa Elena: Salinas	Unplaced	None
2015	Miss Ecuador 2015: 1st Runner-up	Daniela Jiména Armijos Cordero	Azuay: Cuenca	Unplaced	None
2016	Miss Ecuador 2016: 1st runner up	Bianka Yamel Fuentes Dieb^{A}	Guayas: Guayaquil	Resigned	Resigned
2016	Miss Ecuador 2016: 2nd Runner-up	Ivanna Fiorella Abad Vásquez^{A}	El Oro: Machala	Unplaced	Miss International Americas
2017	Miss Ecuador 2017: 1st Runner-up	Jocelyn Daniela Mieles Zambrano	Manabí: Manta	Top 8	None
2018	Miss Ecuador 2018: 1st Runner-up	Michelle Nathalie Huet Rodríguez	Guayas: Guayaquil	Top 8	Best in National Costume; Winner
2019	Miss Ecuador 2019: 1st Runner-up	Alegría María Tobar Cordovés	Pichincha: Quito	Unplaced	None
No pageant was held from 2020 to 2021 due to COVID-19 pandemic
2022	Miss Ecuador 2021: 1st Runner-up	Valeria Gutiérrez Pinto	Guayas: Guayaquil	Unplaced	Miss Photogenic; Winner
2023	Miss Ecuador 2022: 1st Runner-up	Tatiana Georgette Kalil Roha	Guayas: Guayaquil	Unplaced	None
2024	Miss Ecuador 2023: 1st Runner-up	Paulethe Dominique Cajas Vela	Pichincha: Quito	Unplaced	Best in National Costume; Top 10
2025	Miss Ecuador 2024: Winner	Eunices Alexandra Rivadeneira Bermeo	Guayas: Guayaquil	TBD	TBD

A.Bianka Fuentes resigned the title. Ivanna Abad took over the title.
B.Tatiana Loor Resigned the title after competing internationally. Nobody took the title over.

=== Provincial rankings ===
Province	Titles	Years
Guayas	15	1962, 1963, 1965, 1967, 1968, 1969, 2004, 2005, 2008, 2013, 2016^{a}, 2018, 2022, 2023, 2025
Pichincha	10	1960, 1961, 1970, 1971, 2002, 2006, 2009, 2011, 2019, 2024
Manabí	03	1964, 1972, 2017
Esmeraldas	01	2007
Loja	01	2010
Santo Domingo	01	2012
Santa Elena	01	2014
Azuay	01	2015
El Oro	01	2016^{a}

a.Guayas resigned the title. El Oro took the title over.

== Miss Earth participation ==
Edition	Selection	Miss Earth Ecuador	Representation	Placement	Awards
Did not compete between 2001—2002
2003	Miss Ecuador 2002: Winner	Isabel Cristina Ontaneda Pinto	Pichincha: Quito	Unplaced	None
2004	Miss Ecuador 2004: 2nd Runner-up	María Luisa Barrios Landívar	Guayas: Guayaquil	Unplaced	None
2005	Miss Earth Ecuador 2005: Appointed	Cristina Eugenia Reyes Hidalgo	Guayas: Guayaquil	Top 16	None
2006	Miss Earth Ecuador 2006: Appointed	María Magdalena Stahl Hurtado	Carchi: San Gabriel	Unplaced	None
2007	Miss Earth Ecuador 2007: Appointed	María Verónica Ochoa Crespo	Azuay: Cuenca	Unplaced	None
2008	Miss Earth Ecuador 2008: Appointed	Andrea Carolina León Janzso	El Oro: Machala	Unplaced	Miss Congeniality; Winner
2009	Miss Earth Ecuador 2009: Appointed	Diana Nataly Delgado Balseca	Manabí: Manta	Unplaced	None
2010	Miss Earth Ecuador 2010: Appointed	Jennifer Stephanie Pazmiño Saldaña	Guayas: Guayaquil	Miss Earth-Air 2010	Best in Long Gown; Winner; Best in National Costume; Top 5 Best in Swimsuit; Top 5
2011	Miss Earth Ecuador 2011: Appointed	Olga Mercedes Álava Vargas	Guayas: Guayaquil	Miss Earth 2011	None
2012	Miss Earth Ecuador 2012: Appointed	Estefanía Andrea Realpe Pérez^{A}	Pichincha: Quito	Dethroned	Dethroned
2012	Miss Earth Ecuador 2012: Appointed	Tatiana Catalina Torres Rojas^{A}	Azuay: Cuenca	Unplaced	None
2013	Miss Earth Ecuador 2013: Appointed	Ana María Weir Yánez	Guayas: Guayaquil	Unplaced	None
2014	Miss Earth Ecuador 2014: Appointed	María José Maza Solórzano	Guayas: Guayaquil	Unplaced	None
2015	Miss Earth Ecuador 2015: Appointed	Ángela Maritza Bonilla Zapata	Imbabura: Urcuquí	Unplaced	None
2016	Miss Earth Ecuador 2016: Appointed	Katherine Elizabeth Espín Gómez	Cañar: La Troncal	Miss Earth 2016	Best in Long Gown; Winner; Best National Costume; 3rd Place; Best in Swimsuit; 2nd Place; Best in Resort Wear; Winner; Darling of the Press; Winner
2017	Miss Earth Ecuador 2017: Winner	Lessie Mishel Giler Sánchez	Manabí: Portoviejo	Unplaced	Best in Swimsuit; 3rd Place
2018	Miss Earth Ecuador 2018: Winner	Diana Nicole Valdivieso Ortíz	Manabí: Portoviejo	Unplaced	Best in National Costume; 2nd Place
2019	Miss Earth Ecuador 2019: Winner	Karla Antonella Paz Marín	Esmeraldas: Esmeraldas	Unplaced	None
2020	Miss Earth Ecuador 2020: Appointed	Gabriela Yalítza Monsalve Rivera	Manabí: Calceta	Unplaced	None
Did not compete in 2021
2022	Miss Earth Ecuador 2022: Appointed	Susan Brigitte Toledo Arízaga	Santa Elena: Santa Elena	Unplaced	Best in Long Gown; Winner
2023	Miss Earth Ecuador 2023: Appointed	Naomi Yunim Viteri Flores	Santo Domingo: Santo Domingo	Unplaced	None
Did not compete in 2024

A.Estefanía Realpe was dethroned due to not fulfilling her duties; Tatiana Torres was appointed to take over the title.

=== Provincial rankings ===
Province	Titles	Years
Guayas	06	2004, 2005, 2010, 2011, 2013, 2014
Manabí	04	2009, 2017, 2018, 2020
Azuay	02	2007, 2012^{a}
Pichincha	02	2003, 2012^{a}
Carchi	01	2006
El Oro	01	2008
Imbabura	01	2015
Cañar	01	2016
Esmeraldas	01	2019
Santa Elena	01	2022
Santo Domingo	01	2023

a.Pichincha was dethroned. Azuay took the title over.

== Miss Supranational participation ==
Edition	Selection	Miss Supranational Ecuador	Representation	Placement	Awards
2009	Casting: Appointed	Hilda Mirely Barzola González^{A}	Guayas: Nobol	Did not compete	Did not compete
2010	Miss Ecuador 2011: Winner	Claudia Elena Schiess Fretz	Galápagos: Santa Cruz	Unplaced	None
2011	Miss Ecuador 2011: 4th Runner-up	Leslie Anette Ayala Rodríguez	Guayas: Guayaquil	Unplaced	None
2012	Miss Ecuador 2012: Finalist (4°)	Alexandra Sulay Castillo Velasco	Esmeraldas: San Lorenzo	4th Runner-up	Best Body; Winner; Best Talent; Top 12
2013	Miss Ecuador 2013: 2nd Runner-up	Giuliana Guiselle Villavicencio Freire	Guayas: Guayaquil	Unplaced	None
2014	Miss Ecuador 2014: 1st Runner-up	Inés Carolina Panchano Lara^{B}	Esmeraldas: Esmeraldas	Resigned	Resigned
2014	Miss Ecuador 2014: Contestant	Martha María Romero Camposano^{B}	Guayas: Nobol	Unplaced	None
2015	Miss Ecuador 2015: 2nd Runner-up	María Emilia Cevallos Cuesta	Guayas: Guayaquil	Unplaced	None
2016	Miss Ecuador 2016: 2nd Runner-up	Ivanna Fiorella Abad Vásquez^{C}	El Oro: Machala	Vacant	Vacant
2016	Miss Ecuador 2016: 5th Runner-up	María Isabel Piñeyro García^{C}	Guayas: Guayaquil	Unplaced	None
2017	Miss Ecuador 2017: Top 10	Katheryne Eliana López España	Manabí: Pedernales	Place 27°	Miss Photogenic
2018	Miss World Ecuador 2018: 1st Runner-up	Carla Daniela Pardo Thoret	Guayas: Guayaquil	Place 26°	None
2019	Miss World Ecuador 2019: 2nd runner-up	María Fernanda Yépez Montesdeoca	Manabí: Manta	Unplaced	None
No pageant was held in 2020 due to COVID-19 pandemic
2021	CNB Ecuador 2020: Miss Supranational Ecuador	Justeen Amberth Cruz Lara^{D}	Guayas: Guayaquil	Top 24 (16°)	Top 3 Supra Chat - Group 2
2022	CNB Ecuador 2022: Miss Supranational Ecuador	Valery Romina Carabalí Medina^{F}	Guayas: Guayaquil	Top 24 (14°)	Top 15 Miss Elegance; Top 10 Supra Influencer
2023	Casting: Appointed	Andrea Victoria Aguilera Paredes	Los Ríos: Ventanas	Miss Supranational 2023	None
2024	CNB Ecuador 2023: Miss Supranational Ecuador	Doménica Angelina Alessi Vega	Pichincha: Quito	Unplaced	None

A.Sandra Vinces did not compete because her visa was delayed.
B.Inés Panchano resigned the national title since she was 28 years old; instead, Martha Romero was appointed to compete in Miss Supranational 2014.
C.Ivanna Abad resigned the title to take over the title of Miss International Ecuador 2016. Isabel Piñeyro was appointed as Miss Supranational Ecuador 2016.
D.Justeen Cruz represented the U.S. Ecuadorian community at national competition. She is originally from Guayas.
F.Valery Carabalí represented the Coast Region at national competition. She is originally from Guayas.

=== Provincial rankings ===
Province	Titles	Years
Guayas	09	2009, 2011, 2013, 2014^{a}, 2015, 2016^{b}, 2018, 2021^{c}, 2022^{d}
Esmeraldas	02	2012, 2014^{a}
Manabí	02	2017, 2019
Galápagos	01	2010
El Oro	01	2016^{b}
Los Ríos	01	2023
Pichincha	01	2024

a.Esmeraldas was the original winner. Guayas took over.
b.El Oro was the original winner. Guayas took over.
c.The contestant is originally from Guayas, and represented the U.S. Ecuadorian community at the national contest.
d.The contestant is originally from Guayas, and represented the Coast Reagion at the national contest.

== Miss Grand International participation ==
Edition	Selection	Miss Grand Ecuador	Representation	Placement	Awards
2013	Casting: Appointed	Sulay Alexandra Castillo Velásco	Esmeraldas: San Lorenzo	Top 20	None
2014	Miss Ecuador 2014: Contestant	Irene Lucía Zabala Jaramillo	Guayas: Guayaquil	Unplaced	None
2015	Miss Ecuador 2015: 2nd Runner-up	María Emilia Cevallos Cuesta^{A}	Guayas: Guayaquil	Did not compete	Did not compete
2016	Miss Ecuador 2016: 3rd Runner-up	Carmen Verónica Iglesias López	Manabí: Portoviejo	Unplaced	None
2017	Miss Ecuador 2017: 2nd Runner-up	María José Villacís Avendaño^{B}	Imbabura: Ibarra	Resigned	Resigned
2017	Miss Ecuador 2017: Contestant	Analía Viviana Vernaza Daulón^{B}	Pichincha: Quito	Unplaced	None
2018	Miss Ecuador 2018: 2nd Runner-up	Norma Andrea Tejada Arcentales^{C}	El Oro: Machala	Resigned	Resigned
2018	Miss Ecuador 2018: 3rd Runner-up	Blanca Stefany Arámbulo Pinargote^{C}	Guayas: Playas	Unplaced	None
2019	Miss World Ecuador 2019: Top 9	Mara Štefica Topić Verduga^{D}	Guayas: Guayaquil	Top 10	Best National Costume; Winner
2020	CNB Ecuador 2020: Miss Grand Ecuador	Liseth Estefanía Naranjo Goya^{E}	Azuay: Cuenca	Resigned	Resigned
2020	Casting: Appointed	Sonia Augusta Luna Meléndez^{E}	Guayas: Guayaquil	Unplaced	None
2021	Miss Grand Ecuador 2021: Winner	Andrea Victoria Aguilera Paredes	Los Ríos: Ventanas	1st Runner up	Best Swimsuit; Top 20; Best National Costume; Top 20
2022	Miss Grand Ecuador 2021: 1st Runner up	María Emilia Vásquez Larrea^{F}	Pichincha: Quito	Resigned	Resigned
2022	Casting: Appointed	Liseth Estefanía Naranjo Goya	Azuay: Cuenca	Unplaced	None
2023	Miss Grand Ecuador 2023: Winner	Véronique Michielsen Marcillo^{G}^{H}	Pichincha: Quito	Resigned	Resigned
2023	Miss Grand Ecuador 2023: 1st Runner-up	Andrea Cecilia Ojeda Fernández^{H}	Guayas: Guayaquil	Unplaced	None
2024	CNB Ecuador 2023: 1st Runner-up	María José Vera Bone	Los Ríos: Valencia	None	Best National Costume; Winner

A.Emilia Cevallos did not compete due to lack of sponsorship.
B.María José Villacís resigned the title due to personal reasons. Analía Vernaza was appointed to take over the title.
C.Norma Tejada resigned the title due to her studies. Blanca Arámbulo succeeded with the title.
D.Mara Topić represented the U.S. Ecuadorian community at the national pageant. She is originally from Guayas.
E.Lisseth Naranjo resigned the title, instead, Sonia Luna was appointed, by a casting, as the new Miss Grand Ecuador 2020.
F.Emilia Vásquez resigned the title, instead, Lisseth Naranjo was appointed, by a casting, as the new Miss Grand Ecuador 2022.
G.The contestant is originally from Pichincha, and represented the Europe Ecuadorian community at the national contest.
H.Véronique Michielsen resigned the title, therefore Andrea Ojeda assumed as the new Miss Grand Ecuador 2023.

=== Provincial rankings ===
Province	Titles	Years
Guayas	06	2014, 2015, 2018^{b}, 2019^{c}, 2020^{d}, 2023^{g}
Pichincha	03	2017^{a}, 2020^{e}, 2023^{f}^{g}
Los Ríos	02	2021, 2024
Azuay	02	2020^{d}, 2022^{e}
Esmeraldas	01	2013
Manabí	01	2016
Imbabura	01	2017^{a}
El Oro	01	2018^{b}

a.Imbabura was the original winner. Pichincha took over.
b.El Oro was the original winner. Manabí took over.
c.The contestant was originally from Guayas, and represented the U.S. Ecuadorian community at the national contest.
d.Azuay was elected as the original representative, but she resigned. Sonia Luna from Guayas was appointed as the new representative.
e.Pichincha was elected as the original representative, but she resigned. Lisseth Naranjo from Azuay was appointed as the new representative.
f.The contestant is originally from Pichincha, and represented the Europe Ecuadorian community at the national contest.
g.Pichincha was elected as the original representative, but she resigned. Alejandra Ojeda from Guayas assumed as the new representative.

== Miss Eco International participation ==
Edition	Selection	Miss Eco Ecuador	Representation	Placement	Awards
Did not compete between 2015—2017
2018	Casting: Appointed	Diana Aracelly Palacios Morales	Tungurahua: Ambato	Top 21	None
2019	Casting: Appointed	Jocelyn Daniela Mieles Zambrano	Manabí: Manta	Top 10	None
No pageant was held in 2020 due to COVID-19 pandemic
2021	Casting: Appointed	Susan Brigitte Toledo Arízaga	Santa Elena: Santa Elena	Top 10	None
Did not compete in 2022
2023	Casting: Appointed	Génesis Nicole Guerrero Cabrera	Guayas: Guayaquil	4th Runner-up	None
2024	Casting: Appointed	María Denisse Jaramillo Celdo	Galápagos: Puerto Villamil	Top 21	None

=== Provincial rankings ===
Province	Titles	Years
Tungurahua	01	2018
Manabí	01	2019
Santa Elena	01	2021
Guayas	01	2023
Galápagos	01	2024

== Reina Hispanoamericana participation ==
Edition	Selection	Reina Hispanoamericana Ecuador	Representation	Placement	Awards
1991	Miss Ecuador 1991: Contestant	Mónica Paola Triviño Velásquez	Guayas: Guayaquil	Unplaced	None
1992	Casting: Appointed	Priscila Arcos Moran	Guayas: Guayaquil	Unplaced	None
1993	Miss Ecuador 1993: 1st Runner-up	Paola Vintimilla Moscoso	Pichincha: Quito	Reina Sudamericana 1993	None
1994	Casting: Appointed	Greta Alexandra Pinzón Cabezas	Guayas: Guayaquil	Unplaced	None
Did not compete in 1995
1996	Casting: Appointed	Johana Bran	Guayas: Guayaquil	Unplaced	None
1997	Casting: Appointed	María Elizabeth Leopold	Guayas: Guayaquil	Unplaced	None
1998	Casting: Appointed	Cynthia Sánchez	Guayas: Guayaquil	Unplaced	None
1999	Casting: Appointed	Gabriela Cajas Ruat	Pichincha: Quito	Unplaced	None
Did not compete in 2000
2001	Casting: Appointed	Julia Román Rodríguez	Loja: Macará	3rd Runner-up	None
2002	Casting: Appointed	Marcela Cora Ruete Drisio	Guayas: Guayaquil	Reina Sudamericana 2002	Miss Friendship
2003	Casting: Appointed	María Luisa Barrios Landívar	Guayas: Guayaquil	Unplaced	None
2004	Casting: Appointed	Valeska Alexandra Saab Gómez	Guayas: Guayaquil	Unplaced	None
2005	Miss Ecuador 2004: 4th Runner-up	Priscila Verónica Del Salto Astudillo	El Oro: Machala	Virreina Sudamericana 2005	Miss Talent; Winner
2006	Casting: Appointed	Estefanny Carolina Salgado Tomaselli	El Oro: Machala	Unplaced	Best in National Costume; Winner
2007	Casting: Appointed	María Rebeca Flores Jaramillo	Azuay: Cuenca	Unplaced	None
Did not compete in 2008
2009	Miss Ecuador 2009: Winner	María Sandra Vinces Pinargote	Manabí: Portoviejo	Virreina Hispanoamericana 2009	None
2010	Miss Ecuador 2010: Winner	Lady Fernanda Mina Lastra	Guayas: Guayaquil	Unplaced	Best in National Costume; Winner
2011	Miss Ecuador 2011: 3rd Runner-up	Olga Mercedes Álava Vargas	Guayas: Guayaquil	3rd Runner-up	None
2012	Miss Ecuador 2012: Finalist (5°)	Valeria Nicole Cevallos Correa	Guayas: Guayaquil	Unplaced	None
2013	Miss Ecuador 2013: 3rd Runner-up	Eliana Nathaly Molína Alarcón	Manabí: Manta	Unplaced	None
2014	Miss Ecuador 2014: 1st Runner-up	Inés Carolina Panchano Lara	Esmeraldas: Esmeraldas	3rd Runner-up	None
2015	Miss Ecuador 2015: 4th Runner-up	María Guadalupe Arias Mendoza	Pichincha: Quito	Unplaced	Best Hair; Winner
2016	Miss Ecuador 2016: 4th Runner-up	Johanna Yoselin Noroña Onofre	Los Ríos: Buena Fé	Unplaced	None
2017	Miss Ecuador 2017: 5th Runner-up	Johanna Nicole Hidalgo Silva	Chimborazo: Riobamba	Unplaced	None
2018	Miss Ecuador 2018: Contestant	Lisseth Naranjo Goya	Azuay: Cuenca	5th Runner-up	Best in National Costume; Winner
2019	Miss Ecuador 2019: 5th Runner-up	María José Rivera Ibarra	Orellana: Coca	Unplaced	None
No pageant was held in 2020 due to COVID-19 pandemic
2021	Miss Ecuador 2020: 5th Runner-up	Daniela Alejandra Rodríguez Estéves^{A}	Guayas: Guayaquil	Resigned	Resigned
2021	Miss Ecuador 2020: 2nd Runner-up	María Luisa Corrales Cobos^{A}	Pichincha: Quito	Unplaced	Best in National Costume; Winner
2022	Miss Ecuador 2022: Top 10	Alejandra Estefanía Lombedia Garófalo^{B}	Santo Domingo: Santo Domingo	Resigned	Resigned
2022	Miss Ecuador 2021: Top 10	Heather Ashley Valdéz Yépez^{B}	Guayas: Guayaquil	Unplaced	None
2023	Miss Ecuador 2022: 4th Runner-up	Juliana Jariel Robles Requelme	El Oro: Machala	Top 13	None
2024–25	Miss Ecuador 2024: 2nd Runner-up	Dagmar Prieto Mera	Los Ríos: San Camilo	Top 12	Miss Tourism; Winner

A.Daniela Rodríguez resigned the title due to personal reasons. María Luisa Corrales was appointed to take over the title.
B.Alejandra Lombeida resigned the title due to personal reasons. Heather Valdéz was appointed to take over the title.

=== Provincial rankings ===
Province	Titles	Years
Guayas	14	1991, 1992, 1994, 1996, 1997, 1998, 2002, 2003, 2004, 2010, 2011, 2012, 2021^{a}, 2022^{b}
Pichincha	04	1993, 1999, 2015, 2021^{a}
El Oro	03	2005, 2006, 2023
Manabí	02	2009, 2013
Azuay	02	2007, 2018
Los Ríos	02	2016, 2024
Loja	01	2001
Esmeraldas	01	2014
Chimborazo	01	2017
Orellana	01	2019
Santo Domingo	01	2022^{b}

a.Guayas was the original appointed. Pichincha took over.
b.Santo Domingo was the original appointed. Guayas took over.

== Miss United Continents participation ==
Edition	Selection	Miss United Continents Ecuador	Representation	Placement	Awards
2006	Miss Ecuador 2006: Winner	Catalina Mercedes López Saman	Guayas: Guayaquil	Top 6	Miss Photogenic; Winner; Miss Yambal; Winner
2007	Miss Ecuador 2007: Winner	María Lugina Cabezas Andrade	Pichincha: Quito	Unplaced	Miss Congeniality; Winner
2008	Miss Ecuador 2008: Winner	María Doménica Saporitti Hinojosa	Guayas: Guayaquil	2nd Runner-up	Best National Costume; 2nd Place
2009	Miss Ecuador 2009: Winner	María Sandra Vinces Pinargot	Manabí: Portoviejo	2nd Runner-up	Best National Costume; 3rd Place
2010	Miss Ecuador 2010: Winner	Lady Fernanda Mina Lastra	Guayas: Guayaquil	Unplaced	None
2011	Miss Ecuador 2011: Winner	Claudia Elena Schiess Fretz	Galápagos: Santa Cruz	Miss American Continent 2011	Best National Costume; Winner
2012	Miss Ecuador 2012: 2nd Runner-up	Tatiana Katherine Loor Hidalgo	Santo Domingo: Santo Domingo	Unplaced	None
2013	Miss Ecuador 2012: Winner	Andrea Carolina Aguirre Pérez	Guayas: Guayaquil	Miss United Continents 2013	Best National Costume; Winner; Miss Yambal; Winner
2014	Miss Ecuador 2014: 4th Runner-up	Dianella López Dueñas	Manabí: Portoviejo	Unplaced	None
2015	Miss Ecuador 2015: Contestant	María Elisa Padilla Cardoso	Azuay: Cuenca	3rd Runner-up	Miss New Huancavilca; Winner
2016	Miss Ecuador 2016: Contestant	María Cecilia Drouet Contreras	Santa Elena: Salinas	Unplaced	None
2017	Miss Ecuador 2017: Contestant	Biana Nicole Benavides Gómez	Guayas: Guayaquil	Top 10	Miss Congeniality; Winner
2018	Miss Ecuador 2018: Contestant	Gabriela Alexandra Carrillo Zambrano	Guayas: Guayaquil	Unplaced	Best Smile; Winner
2019	Miss Ecuador 2019: 4th Runner-up	Eliza Aminta Quiñónez Godoy	Esmeraldas: Esmeraldas	1st Runner-up	Best Smile; Winner
No pageant was held between from 2020 to 2021 due to COVID-19 pandemic
2022	Casting: Appointed	Virginia Ivanova Vélez García	Manabí: Chone	1st Runner-up	None
No pageant has been held between 2023-present

=== Provincial rankings ===
Province	Titles	Years
Guayas	06	2006, 2008, 2010, 2013, 2017, 2018
Manabí	03	2009, 2014, 2022
Pichincha	01	2007
Galápagos	01	2011
Santo Domingo	01	2012
Azuay	01	2015
Santa Elena	01	2016
Esmeraldas	01	2019

== Miss América Latina participation ==
Edition	Selection	Miss América Latina Ecuador	Representation	Placement	Awards
1983	Miss Ecuador 1983: 3rd Runner-up	Giselle Nader Bucaram	Guayas: Guayaquil	Unplaced	None
1984	Casting: Appointed	Cecilia Pozo Carminer	Guayas: Guayaquil	Top 10	None
1985	Casting: Appointed	Sandra La Mota	Pichincha: Quito	Unplaced	None
Did not compete in 1986
1987	Miss Ecuador 1987: 4th Runner-up	Gianella Avellaneda Mosquera	Guayas: Guayaquil	Unplaced	None
Did not compete in 1988
1989	Casting: Appointed	Alexandra Argudo	Pichincha: Quito	Unplaced	None
1990	Casting: Appointed	Radmila Pandžić Arapov	Manabí: Manta	2nd Runner-up	None
1991	Miss Mundo Ecuador 1991: 3rd Runner-up	Lourdes Butiña	Azuay: Cuenca	Top 8	None
1992	Miss Mundo Ecuador 1992: Winner	Suanny Denise Bejarano López	Guayas: Guayaquil	Top 8	None
1993	Casting: Appointed	Priscilla Arcos Morán	Guayas: Guayaquil	Unplaced	None
1994	Casting: Appointed	Mónica Villacís	Pichincha: Quito	Unplaced	None
Did not compete in 1995
1996	Casting: Appointed	Verónica Noboa	Pichincha: Quito	Unplaced	None
Did not compete in 1997
1998	Casting: Appointed	Ana María Serrano Barona	Pichincha: Quito	1st Runner-up	None
1999	Casting: Appointed	Gabriela Espinoza	Pichincha: Quito	Unplaced	None
Did not compete between 2000—2001
2002	Casting: Appointed	Laura Cruz Hernández	Guayas: Guayaquil	Unplaced	None
2003	Casting: Appointed	Bella Carolina Cárdenas Bustamante	Pichincha: Quito	Unplacedd	None
2004	Casting: Appointed	Viviana Carbo Miranda	Guayas: Guayaquil	Top 7	None
2005	Miss Ecuador 2005: Contestant	Gía Paola Baquerizo Vallazza	Guayas: Guayaquil	2nd Runner-up	None
2006	Casting: Appointed	Karla Paola Milán Pérez	Guayas: Guayaquil	Unplaced	None
2007	Casting: Appointed	María Magdalena Stahl Hurtado	Carchi: San Gabriel	4th Runner-up	None
2008	Miss Ecuador 2008: Contestant	María Juliana Ponce Jubert	Tungurahua: Ambato	Unplaced	South America Queen; Winner
2009	Miss América Latina Ecuador 2008: Appointed	Luisa María Correa Duclos	Loja: Loja	Top 12	None
2010	Miss América Latina Ecuador 2010: Appointed	María José Delgado Solís	Guayas: Guayaquil	Top 12	None
2011	Miss América Latina Ecuador 2011	Estefani María Chalco Salgado	Azuay: Cuenca	Miss América Latina 2011	None
2012	Miss América Latina Ecuador 2012: Appointed	María Alejandra Proaño López	Manabí: Manta	Top 12	None
2013	Miss América Latina 2013: Appointed	Rocío Claribel González Loor	Manabí: Manta	Top 12	None
2014	Miss América Latina Ecuador 2014: Appointed	Cristina Correa	Azuay: Cuenca	Unplaced	Best Fantasy Costume; Winner
2015	Miss América Latina Ecuador 2015: Appointed	María Belén Breilh Álava	Guayas: Guayaquil	Unplaced	None
Did not compete between 2016-2017
2018	Miss América Latina Ecuador 2018: Appointed	Fernanda Brito	Azuay: Cuenca	Unplaced	None
2019	Miss América Latina Ecuador 2019: Appointed	Cristina Macías	Morona Santiago: Sucúa	Unplaced	South America Queen; Winner
No pageant was held in 2020 due to COVID-19 pandemic
Did not compete between 2021-2023
2024	Miss América Latina Ecuador 2024: Appointed	Lilibeth Maholy Ortiz Quintero	Esmeraldas: Esmeraldas	Unplaced	Best National Costume; Winner

=== Provincial rankings ===
Province	Titles	Years
Guayas	11	1983, 1984, 1987, 1992, 1993, 2002, 2004, 2005, 2006, 2010, 2015
Pichincha	07	1985, 1989, 1994, 1996, 1998, 1999, 2003
Azuay	04	1991, 2011, 2014, 2018
Manabí	03	1990, 2012, 2013
Carchi	01	2007
Tungurahua	01	2008
Morona Santiago	01	2019
Esmeraldas	01	2024

== Miss Atlántico Internacional participation ==
Edition	Selection	Miss Atlántico Ecuador	Representation	Placement	Awards
Did not compete between 1997—1999
1999	Casting: Appointed	María Elizabeth Leopold	Guayas: Guayaquil	Unplaced	None
Did not compete between 2000—2002
2003	Casting: Appointed	Daniela Ruíz	Guayas: Guayaquil	Unplaced	None
Did not compete between 2004—2005
2006	Casting: Appointed	Diana Karina Sánchez Ormaza	Manabí: Manta	Unplaced	None
2007	Casting: Appointed	Laura Cruz	Guayas: Guayaquil	2nd Runner-up	None
2008	Casting: Appointed	Ana Elizabeth Cordero Loyola	Azuay: Cuenca	Unplaced	None
2009	Casting: Appointed	Eliana Ninfa Quinteros Branda	Esmeraldas: Quinindé	Miss Atlántico Internacional 2009	None
2010	Casting: Appointed	Yuliana Estefanía Delgado Pontón	El Oro: Atahualpa	Unplaced	None
2011	Casting: Appointed	Mariuxi Denisse Bajaña Mackliff	Guayas: Guayaquil	Unplaced	None
2012	Casting: Appointed	Fátima Gianina Bayona Grijalva	Guayas: Guayaquil	Unplaced	None
2013	Casting: Appointed	Zayonara Fernández García	Los Ríos: Quevedo	Unplaced	None
2014	Casting: Appointed	María Belén Ruíz Velásco	Guayas: Guayaquil	Unplaced	None
2015	Casting: Appointed	María José Gutiérrez Montaño	Esmeraldas: Esmeraldas	Unplaced	None
2016	Casting: Appointed	María José Otavalo	Azuay: Cuenca	Unplaced	Best National Costume; Winner
Did not compete in 2017
2018	Casting: Appointed	María Esther Hernández Mena	Pichincha: Quito	Unplaced	None
No pageant has been held between 2019—Present

=== Provincial rankings ===
Province	Titles	Years
Guayas	06	1999, 2003, 2007, 2011, 2012, 2014
Esmeraldas	02	2009, 2015
Azuay	02	2008, 2016
Manabí	01	2006
El Oro	01	2010
Los Ríos	01	2013
Pichincha	01	2018
