= Miss Grand Ecuador =

National beauty contest in Ecuador

- Formation: 26 June 2021; 5 years ago as Miss Grand Ecuador pageant
- Founder: Tahiz Panuz
- Purpose: Beauty pageant
- Headquarters: Guayaquil
- Location: Ecuador
- Official language: Spanish
- National Director: Tahiz Panus; Miguel Panus
- Parent organization: Concurso Nacional de Belleza Ecuador (2019 – present)
- Affiliations: Miss Grand International

Miss Grand Ecuador
licensees timeline

Stand-alone pageant
Under another pageant
Appointed titleholder
No licensee/titleholder

Miss Grand Ecuador is an Ecuadorian female national beauty pageant launched in 2021 by the Concurso Nacional de Belleza Ecuador (CNB Ecuador) organization, directed by Tahiz Panus and Miguel Panus. Its aim is to select a country representative to participate in its parent pageant, Miss Grand International. Previously, the competition franchise belonged to Maria del Carmen Aguayo, who usually chose the runners-up or national finalists from her national pageant, Miss Ecuador, for international competitions.

Ecuador has had three Miss Grand International placements; the highest was first runner-up, Andrea Aguilera in 2021, and Mara Topic reached the top 10 in 2019.

== History ==
Ecuador first appeared at the 2013 pageant, when Alexandra Zulay Castillo Velasco, the national finalist of Miss Ecuador 2012, reached the top 20. From 2013 to 2018, the Ecuadorian franchise was the Miss Ecuador organization, with one of the pageant finalists being appointed as Miss Grand Ecuador. Only contestants qualified for the top 20 at international contests, the others were unplaced. Later in 2019, Ecuador ended its record of non-placement after the new franchisee, the Concurso Nacional de Belleza Ecuador, appointed Mara Topic Verduga from Guayaquil, to Miss Grand International 2019. At the contest she reached the top 10, and received the Best in National Costume award.

Tahiz Panus and Miguel Panus, the presidents of Concurso Nacional de Belleza Ecuador (CNB Ecuador), have been the national directors of Miss Grand Ecuador since 2019. The first edition of Miss Grand Ecuador was on June 26, 2021, at the TC Televisión studios in Guayaquil. The contest featured six national finalists from six provinces, including Cañar, El Oro, Esmeraldas, Los Ríos, Manabí, and Pichincha. Andrea Aguilera Paredes from Los Ríos Province won. Aguilera was the first runner-up at Miss Grand International 2021 in Thailand. She was the highest placed of Ecuador at the contest since 2013. Previously, Aguilera competed at Miss Earth Ecuador 2019 and did not win.

No contest was held in 2022, and the first runner-up of 2021, Emilia Vásquez of Pichincha Province, was appointed to represent the country at Miss Grand International 2022 in Indonesia, but was replaced by Liseth Naranjo for undisclosed reasons. Naranjo was Miss Grand Ecuador 2020 but was removed before competing.

== Editions ==
=== Location and date ===
The Miss Grand Ecuador pageant was separately held once in 2021, and the upcoming pageant was scheduled to be held in 2023.

Edition	Date	Final venue	Host province	Entrants	Ref.
1st	26 June 2021	TC Televisión Studios, Guayaquil	Guayas	6	
2nd	15 April 2023	TC Televisión Studios, Guayaquil	Guayas	7	

=== Competition result ===
Edition	Winner	Runners-up		Ref.
Edition	Winner	First	Second	Ref.
1st	Andrea Aguilera (Los Ríos	Emilia Vásquez (Pichincha)	Marjorie Vivas (Manabí)	
2nd	Véronique Michielsen (Ecuadorian commu. in Europe)	Andrea Ojeda (Guayaquil)	Alyson Flores (Santo Domingo)	

== International competition ==
The following is a list of Ecuadorian representatives at the Miss Grand International contest.

Color keys

- : Declared the winner
- : Finished as a runner-up (Top 5)
- : Finished as a finalist (Top 10)
- : Finished as a semifinalist (Top 20/22)
- : Finished as special awards winner

Year	Province	Miss Grand Ecuador	Title	Placement	Special Awards	National Director
2026	Manabí	Shyare Andrade	CNB Ecuador 2026 – Miss Grand Ecuador	1st runner-up		Tahiz Panuz
2025	Pichincha	Samantha Quenedit	CNB Ecuador 2025 – Miss Grand Ecuador	Top 22		Tahiz Panuz
2024	Los Ríos	María José Vera	CNB Ecuador 2023 – Virreina Miss World Ecuador	Unplaced	Best National Costume	Tahiz Panuz
2023	Antwerp, Belgium	Véronique Michielsen	Miss Grand Ecuador 2023	Did not compete		Tahiz Panuz
2023	Guayas	Andrea Ojeda	1st runner-up Miss Grand Ecuador 2023	Unplaced		Tahiz Panuz
2022	Pichincha	Emilia Vásquez	1st runner-up Miss Grand Ecuador 2021	Did not compete		Tahiz Panuz
2022	Guayas	Lisseth Naranjo	CNB Ecuador 2020 – Grand International	Unplaced		Tahiz Panuz
2021	Los Ríos	Andrea Aguilera	Miss Grand Ecuador 2021	1st runner-up		Tahiz Panuz
2020	Guayas	Lisseth Naranjo	CNB Ecuador 2020 – Grand International	Did not compete		Tahiz Panuz
2020	Guayas	Sonia Luna	1st runner-up Miss Ecuador 2019	Unplaced		Tahiz Panuz
2019	Guayas	Mara Topić	Appointed	Top 10	Best National Costume	Tahiz Panuz
2018	El Oro	Norma Tejada	2nd runner-up Miss Ecuador 2018	Did not compete		María del Carmen Aguayo
2018	Guayas	Blanca Arambulo	3rd runner-up Miss Ecuador 2018	Unplaced		María del Carmen Aguayo
2017	Imbabura	María José Villacís	2nd runner-up Miss Ecuador 2017	Did not compete		María del Carmen Aguayo
2017	Pichincha	Analía Vernaza	Appointed	Unplaced		María del Carmen Aguayo
2016	Guayas	Carmen Iglesias	3rd runner-up Miss Ecuador 2016	Unplaced		María del Carmen Aguayo
2015	Guayas	María Emilia Cevallos	2nd runner-up Miss Ecuador 2015	Did not compete		María del Carmen Aguayo
2014	Guayas	Irene Lucia Zabala	Appointed	Unplaced		María del Carmen Aguayo
2013	Esmeraldas	Alexandra Castillo	Appointed	Top 20		María del Carmen Aguayo

== National pageant candidates ==
=== Participating provinces and territories representatives ===
Representatives	1st	2nd
Provinces
Azuay		
Bolívar		
Cañar	Y	
Carchi		
Chimborazo		
Cotopaxi		
El Oro	Y	Y
Esmeraldas	Y	Y
Galápagos		
Guayas		
Imbabura		
Loja		
Los Ríos		
Manabí		Y
Morona Santiago		
Napo		
Orellana		
Pastaza		
Pichincha		
Santa Elena		
Santo Domingo de los Tsáchilas		
Sucumbíos		
Tungurahua		
Zamora Chinchipe		
No affiliated province
Ecuadorian communities in Europe		
Ecuadorian communities in USA		Y
Guayaquil		
Total	6	7
Color keys: : Declared as the winner; : Ended as a 1st runner-up; : Ended as a 2nd runner-up; A : Ended as a finalist, semifinalist and unplaced; × : Ended as withdrew during the competition; × : Ended as no representative

== Winners gallery ==
2026, Shyare Andrade

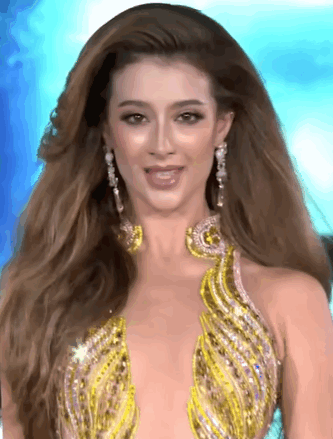
2025, Samantha Quenedit

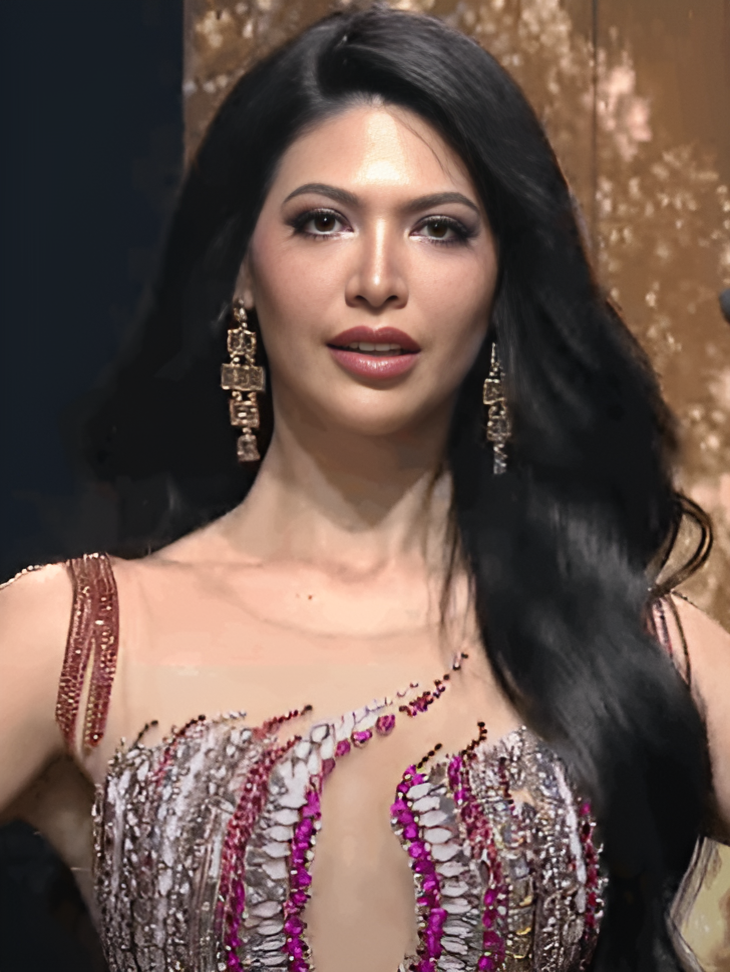
2024, María José Vera

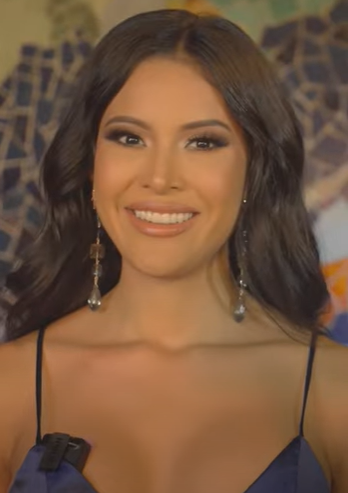
2022, Lisseth Naranjo

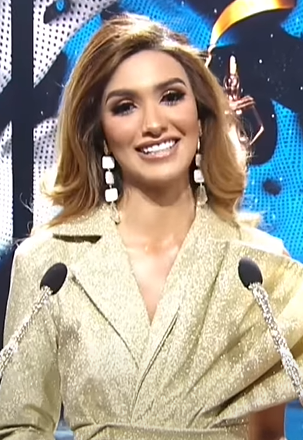
2021, Andrea Aguilera

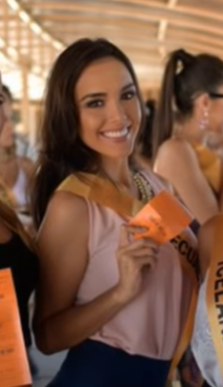
2016, Carmen Iglesias

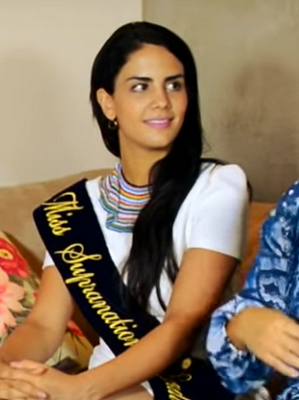
2015, María Cevallos

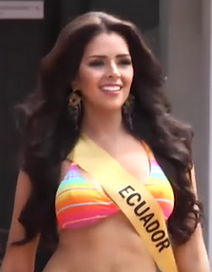
2014, Irene Zabala
