= Miss Ecuador 2019 =

Beauty pageant edition

- Date: July 19, 2019
- Presenters: Guillermo Arduino; Claudia Schiess
- Entertainment: Alkilados; Jorge Luis Del Hiero
- Venue: Teatro Centro de Arte "Léon Febres-Cordero", Guayaquil, Guayas
- Broadcaster: Gamavisión
- Entrants: 21
- Placements: 10
- Withdrawals: Los Ríos; Pastaza; Tungurahua; USA Community
- Returns: Galápagos; Orellana; Santa Elena
- Winner: Cristina Hidalgo; Guayas

Miss Ecuador 2019 was the 69th edition of the Miss Ecuador pageant. The Gala Finale was held on July 19, 2019. Virginia Limongi crowned her successor, Cristina Hidalgo from Guayaquil, at the end of the event. The winner represented Ecuador at Miss Universe 2019 pageant.

== Results ==
=== Placements ===
Placement	Contestant
Miss Ecuador 2019; Miss Ecuador Ecuador 2019	Guayas – Cristina Hidalgo
1st Runner-Up; Miss International Ecuador 2019	Pichincha – Alegría Tobar
2nd Runner-Up	Guayas – Sonia Luna
3rd Runner-Up	Guayas – Sofía Freille
4th Runner-Up	Esmeraldas – Eliza Quiñónez
5th Runner-Up	Orellana – María José Rivera
Top 10	El Oro – Annelie Ruíz; Esmeraldas – Vivian Quiñónez; Manabí – Mishell Coppiano; Santa Elena – Susana Rivera

=== Special awards ===
Award	Contestant
Miss Congeniality	Pichincha - Karen Campoverde
Miss Photogenic	Guayas - Sonia Luna
Miss Glamour	Santa Elena - Susana Rivera
Miss Puntuality	Esmeraldas - Eliza Quiñónez
Miss Cielo	Guayas - Sonia Luna
Miss Smile	Santa Elena - Susana Rivera
Best National Costume	Esmeraldas - Vivian Quiñónez

=== Best National Costume ===
Award	Contestant
Best National Costume	Esmeraldas - Vivian Quiñónez (Beyamín Maffaré)
1st Runner-up	Guayas - Cristina Hidalgo (Manolo Loor)
2nd Runner-up	Guayas - Geovanna Párraga (Jennifer Fiallos)

== Contestants ==
The following are the list of official candidates of Miss Ecuador 2019:

Province	Contestant	Age	Height	Hometown
Azuay	Diana Johmara Guambaña Reibán	19	1.70 m (5 ft 7 in)	Cuenca
El Oro	Annelie Mishel Ruíz Buestán	22	1.75 m (5 ft 9 in)	Machala
Esmeraldas	Eliza Aminta Quiñónez Godoy	23	1.75 m (5 ft 9 in)	Esmeraldas
Esmeraldas	Lilian Vivian Quiñónez Córtez	23	1.72 m (5 ft 7 1/2 in)	San Lorenzo
Galápagos	Ariana Fernanda Abad Ricaurte	25	1.70 m (5 ft 7 in)	Puerto Baquerizo Moreno
Guayas	Alejandra Andrea Carvajal Murrieta	24	1.70 m (5 ft 7 in)	Guayaquil
Guayas	Sofía Jeanine Freile Cuadros	26	1.70 m (5 ft 7 in)	Guayaquil
Guayas	Andreína Linabeth González Morán	25	1.72 m (5 ft 7 1/2 in)	Guayaquil
Guayas	Cristina María Hidalgo Berry	22	1.78 m (5 ft 10 in)	Guayaquil
Guayas	Sonia Augusta Luna Menéndez	24	1.78 m (5 ft 10 in)	Guayaquil
Guayas	Gladys Geovanna Párraga Arellano	25	1.70 m (5 ft 7 in)	Guayaquil
Loja	Andrea Alexandra Burneo Ordoñez	22	1.70 m (5 ft 7 in)	Loja
Manabí	Yelina Mishell Coppiano Argüello	23	1.71 m (5 ft 7 1/2 in)	Chone
Manabí	Vielka Jacqueline Cañarte Parrales	23	1.70 m (5 ft 7 in)	Manta
Manabí	Génesis Valeria Macías Lugo	19	1.70 m (5 ft 7 in)	Manta
Orellana	María José Rivera	18	1.78 m (5 ft 10 in)	Coca
Pichincha	Ana Gabriela Cevallos Rovere	24	1.71 m (5 ft 7 1/2 in)	Quito
Pichincha	Alegría María Tobar Cordovés	25	1.73 m (5 ft 8 in)	Quito
Pichincha	Karen Fernanda Campoverde Pillajo	21	1.70 m (5 ft 7 in)	Sangolquí
Santo Domingo	Mishelle ELizabeth Vega Vivanco	23	1.70 m (5 ft 7 in)	Santo Domingo
Santa Elena	Susana Nicolle Rivera Pintado	24	1.71 m (5 ft 7 1/2 in)	Santa Elena

== Crossovers ==
- Eliza Quiñónez was Reina de Esmeraldas 2016, Reina de la Província de Esmeraldas 2017, and 2nd Runner-up at Reina Mundial del Banano Ecuador 2018.
- Ariana Abad was Reina de San Cristóbal 2018.
- Sofía Freile competed at Miss Earth Ecuador 2017 where she finished as Miss Fire (3rd Runner-up).
- Andreína González competed at Miss World Ecuador 2013 and Reina Internacional de la Ganadería 2015, but she was unplaced at both pageants. Also competed in Miss Latinoamerica 2016 where she finished 2nd Runner-Up
- Sonia Luna was Reina de Guayaquil 2017; and she competed at Reina Internacional de la Ganadería 2017, but she was unplaced.
- Andrea Burneo was Miss World Loja 2017, but she resigned before competing at Miss World Ecuador 2018.
- Mishell Coppiano was Reina de Chone 2014 and 1st Runner-up (2nd Place) at Reina de Manabí 2014.
- Vielka Cañarte competed at Reina de Manta 2016, but she was unplaced.
- Valeria Macías competed at Reina de Manta 2017 where she finished as Virreina (1st Runner-up).
- Gabriela Cevallos was Reina de Catamayo 2012.
- Susana Rivera competed at Miss World Ecuador 2015, but she was unplaced.
- Mishell Vega competed at Reina de Santo Domingo 2018, but she was unplaced.
