= Miss Ecuador 2016 =

Beauty pageant edition

- Date: March 12, 2016
- Presenters: Carlos Montero; Alejandra Argudo
- Entertainment: Johann Vera
- Venue: Oro Verde Hotel, Machala, El Oro
- Broadcaster: Gama TV
- Entrants: 21
- Placements: 6
- Withdrawals: Carchi; Cotopaxi; Imbabura; Santo Domingo; Tungurahua
- Returns: Los Ríos; Manabí; Pastaza; Santa Elena; USA Community
- Winner: Connie Jiménez; Los Ríos
- Congeniality: Francesca Possieri (Guayas)
- Best National Costume: Zulibeth Coronel (Pastaza)
- Photogenic: Connie Jiménez (Los Rios)

Miss Ecuador 2016, the 66th Miss Ecuador pageant, was held on March 12, 2016, in Machala, El Oro. Francesca Cipriani, Miss Ecuador 2015 from Guayas crowned her successor Connie Jiménez of Los Ríos at the end of the event. The winner represented Ecuador at Miss Universe 2016 and went on to be the governor of her province.

== Results ==
=== Placements ===
Placement	Contestant
Miss Ecuador 2016; Miss Universe Ecuador 2016	Los Ríos – Connie Jiménez
1st Runner-Up (Miss International Ecuador 2016)	Guayas – Bianka Fuentes (Resigned)
2nd Runner-Up (Miss Supranational Ecuador 2016)	El Oro – Ivanna Abad (Resigned MS'16 / Assumed MI'16)
3rd Runner-Up (Miss Grand Ecuador 2016)	Manabí – Carmen Iglesias
4th Runner-Up	Los Ríos – Yoselín Noroña
5th Runner-Up	Guayas Isabel Piñeyro (Assumed MS'16)

=== Special awards ===
Award	Contestant
Miss Congeniality	Guayas - Francesca Possieri
Miss Photogenic	Los Ríos - Connie Jiménez
Miss Sedal	Guayas - Isabel Piñeyro
Miss Puntuality	Guayas - Isabel Piñeyro
Miss Cielo	Los Ríos - Connie Jiménez
Miss Ottie	Pichincha - Carole Abedrabbo
Best National Costume	Pastaza - Zulibeth Coronel
Miss Elegance	Los Ríos - Connie Jiménez
Miss Solidarity	Guayas - Laura Ruíz
Miss Oro Verde	El Oro - Ivanna Abad
Dream Sedal	Guayas - Francesa Possieri

=== Best National Costume ===
Award	Contestant
Best National Costume	Pastaza - Zulibeth Coronel (Luis Ayala)
1st Runner-up	Loja Pichincha - María Fernanda Manzano (Alexi Robalino)
2nd Runner-up	El Oro - Ivanna Abad (Gustavo Otero)

=== Dream Sedal ===
Award	Contestant
Winner	Guayas - Francesca Possieri
Top 5	El Oro - Ivanna Abad; Loja - Karen Vélez; Los Ríos - Connie Jiménez; Pichincha - María Fernanda Manzano

== Notes ==
=== Returns ===
Last compete in:

- 1977
  - USA Community
- 1999
  - Pastaza
- 2013
  - Los Ríos
- 2014
  - Manabí
  - Santa Elena

=== Withdrawals ===
- Carchi
- Cotopaxi
- Imbabura
- Santo Domingo
- Tungurahua

== Crossovers ==
- Cristina Vázquez competed at Reina de Cuenca 2011, but she was unplaced.
- Ivanna Abad was 1st Runner-up (Virreina) at Reina de Machala 2009, and she was Top 5 at Miss Panamarican International 2012.
- Karla Morales competed at Reina de Machala 2013 and Reina del Banano Ecuador 2014; she was unplaced in both pageants.
- Karen Guerrero competed at Reina de Guayaquil 2014 where she was unplaced. She was elected Miss Congeniality.
- Karen Vélez intended to compete at Miss Ecuador 2012, but she was eliminated as precandidate at the Miss Ecuador reality stage. She was Señorita Fundación de Loja 2009
- Yoselin Noroña was Reina de Buena Fé 2014, Reina de Los Ríos 2014 and 1st Runner-up at Miss Tourism World 2015 in Malaysia.
- Carmen Iglesias was Reina del Portoviejo 2014 and Reina de Manabí 2014.
- Cecilia Drouet was Reina de Salinas 2012.
- Zulibeth Coronel was Reina del Puyo 2010 and Reina de Pastaza 2010.
- Milkha Moreira competed at Reina de Quito 2015, but she was unplaced.
- Jushtin Osorio is from Guayaquil, but she represented the US Community.
