= Connie Jiménez =

Ecuadorian model and politician (born 1995)

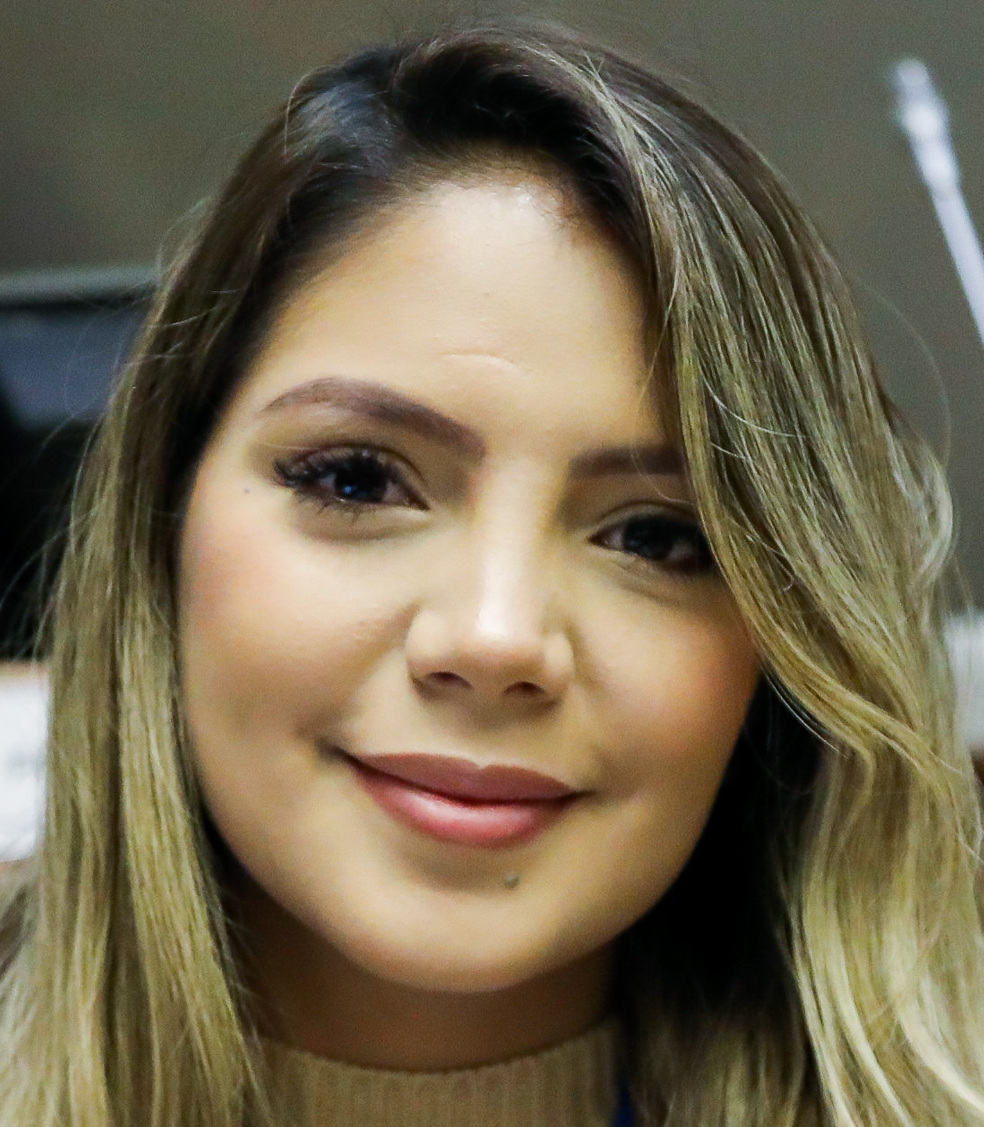
- Connie Jiménez, 2022
- Born: 1995 (age 30–31); Ventanas
- Education: Zamorano Pan-American Agricultural School
- Known for: Miss Ecuador and later Governor of Los Rios
- Predecessor: Génesis Blum

Connie Maily Jiménez Romero (born 29 November 1995) is an Ecuadorian who is the Governor of Los Rios. She was Miss Ecuador 2016 and represented Ecuador at Miss Universe 2016.

== Biography ==
Born and raised in Ventanas, Jiménez is the oldest of three siblings. Her parents are Manuel Jiménez and Katty Romero. She completed her High School studies at the Ecomundo Educational Unit, Babahoyo. In 2015, she graduated with a degree in Agribusiness Administration from the Zamorano Pan-American Agricultural School.

Jiménez began her pageantry career at the age of seven, when she won the Niña Ecuador 2003 competition, held at the Hotel Oro Verde in Guayaquil on September 13, 2003.

On March 12, 2016, she represented her home province of Los Ríos at the 66th Miss Ecuador pageant, held in Machala, El Oro. At the conclusion of the event, she was crowned Miss Ecuador 2016 by her predecessor, Francesca Cipriani (Miss Ecuador 2015) representing Guayas.

Jiménez represented Ecuador at Miss Universe 2016. During the National Costume competition, she wore a costume inspired by the hummingbirds of her homeland, featuring golden wings designed to move with her arm movements. The costume was damaged during the dress rehearsal, and she appeared on stage with a broken, drooping left wing. Jiménez did not advance to the top 13 semifinalists.

In 2022, Jiménez was appointed governor of Los Rios by President Guillermo Lasso, succeeding Génesis Blum. In 2023, her house was attacked by four gunmen, a week after Los Ríos, Manabí, and the Durán canton in Guayas were included in the country's state of emergency. The attack was recorded and reported to the prosecutor's office and was considered an attack against the governor's office.
