= Miss Ecuador 2003 =

- Date: March 27, 2003
- Venue: Teatro Nacional de la Casa de la Cultura, Quito, Pichincha, Ecuador
- Broadcaster: Gamavisión
- Entrants: 11
- Withdrawals: Manabí
- Returns: Imbabura
- Winner: Andrea Jácome; Guayas

The Miss Ecuador 2003 was on March 27, 2003. There were 11 candidates for the national title. The previous winner, Isabel Ontaneda from Pichincha, crowned her successor, Andrea Jácome from Guayas as Miss Ecuador 2003. She competed at Miss Universe 2003.
