= Miss Ecuador 2018 =

Beauty pageant edition

- Date: 5 May 2018
- Presenters: Guillermo Arduino; Claudia Schiess; Francesca Cipriani (Backstage)
- Entertainment: Américo; Dayanara Peralta
- Venue: Hotel Oro Verde de Machala, Machala, El Oro
- Broadcaster: Gamavisión
- Entrants: 22
- Placements: 10
- Withdrawals: Cotopaxi; Chimborazo; Imbabura
- Returns: Azuay; El Oro; Pastaza; Tungurahua; United States Community
- Winner: Virginia Limongi; Manabí

Miss Ecuador 2018, the 68th edition of the Miss Ecuador pageant. The gala finale was held on 5 May 2018, in Machala, El Oro. Daniela Cepeda from Guayas crowned Virginia Limongi from Manabí as Miss Ecuador 2018. The winner competed at Miss Universe 2018.

== Results ==
=== Placements ===
Placement	Contestant
Miss Ecuador 2018; Miss International Ecuador 2018	Manabí – Virginia Limongi
1st Runner-Up; Miss International Ecuador 2018	Guayas – Michelle Huet
2nd Runner-Up; Miss Grand Ecuador 2018	United States – Norma Tejada (Resigned)
3rd Runner-Up	United States – Blanca Arambulo (Assumed MG'18)
4th Runner-Up	Pastaza – Heszen Johst
5th Runner-Up	Esmeraldas – Ximena Arroyo
Top 10	Guayas – Allison Matamoros; Guayas – Iskra Landucci; Pichincha – Fernanda Yépez; Pichincha – Gabriela Jiménez

=== Special awards ===
Award	Contestant
Miss Congeniality	Azuay - Mayra Bravo
Miss Photogenic	USA Community - Norma Tejada
Miss DUET	Manabí - Virginia Limongi
Miss Tourism Green Gold	Pichincha - Gabriela Jiménez
Miss Punctuality	Guayas - Michelle Huet
Miss NIVEA Skin Care	Manabí - Virginia Limongi
Miss Heaven	Manabí - Virginia Limongi
Miss Popularity	Manabí - Virginia Limongi
Best National Costume	Manabí - Virginia Limongi

=== Best National Costume ===
Award	Contestant
Best National Costume	Manabí - Virginia Limongi (Wenceslao Muñoz)
1st Runner-up	USA Community - Norma Tejada (Manolo Loor)
2nd Runner-up	Guayas - Allison Matamoros (Jefferson Vera)

== Contestants ==
Province	Contestant	Age	Height	Hometown
Azuay	Lisseth Estefanía Naranjo Goya	20	1,73	Cuenca
Azuay	Mayra Alejandra Bravo Altamirano	24	1,74	Cuenca
El Oro	Valeria Michelle Guarnizo Jaramillo	23	1,74	Machala
El Oro	Kristel Paulette Ludeña Garzón	20	1,71	Machala
Esmeraldas	Bertha Ximena Arroyo Marín	22	1,73	Esmeraldas
Guayas	Gabriela Alexandra Carrillo Zambrano	23	1,82	Guayaquil
Guayas	Ylinka Nahomy Drašković Pazan	22	1,72	Guayaquil
Guayas	Michelle Nathalie Huet Rodríguez	22	1,74	Guayaquil
Guayas	Iskra Julissa Landucci Martínez	21	1,78	Guayaquil
Guayas	Allison Magali Matamoros Yépez	23	1,78	Guayaquil
Guayas	Mónica Jazmín Fajardo Sornoza	23	1,73	Lomas de Sargentillo
Loja	Silvana Patricia Jaramillo Aguilar	20	1,78	Loja
Los Ríos	Daniela Lüscher Valencia	23	1,72	Babahoyo
Manabí	Virginia Stephanie Limongi Silva	24	1,75	Portoviejo
Pastaza	Kerstin Heszen María Johst Salamah	24	1,81	Mera
Pichincha	Lucía Gabriela Jiménez Prado	26	1,73	Quito
Pichincha	María Fernanda Yépez Montesdeoca	25	1,76	Quito
Santo Domingo	Joselin Valeria Zambrano Alvarado	23	1,70	Santo Domingo
Tungurahua	Mónica Abigaíl Soria Rojas	25	1,71	Ambato
Tungurahua	Cassia Pouleth Hurtado Vásconez	24	1,72	Píllaro
USA Community	Norma Andrea Tejada Arcentales	22	1,77	Miami / Machala
USA Community	Blanca Stefany Arambulo Pinargote	22	1,84	Hackensack / Playas

== Crossovers ==
- Mayra Bravo participated in Miss Global Beauty Queen in 2016 and in Miss Mesoamerica International in 2017.
- Valeria Guarnizo participated in Reina de Machala 2012, finalist in Miss Teen Ecuador 2012 and Virreina in Miss Teen Mesoamérica 2013.
- Ximena Arroyo was Negra Linda de Esmeraldas 2013, Virreina in Miss Teen Ecuador 2013, Miss Turismo de Esmeraldas 2013 and Reina del Ecuador 2013.
- Allison Matamoros was Miss Atlantic Ecuador 2013.
- Mónica Fajardo was Reina of Lomas de Sargentillo in 2011 and Estrella del Carnaval del Guayas in 2015.
- Blanca Arámbulo was Queen of the Ecuadorian Civic Committee in New Jersey in 2014.
- Daniela Lüscher was Queen of Babahoyo in 2015.
- Virginia Limongi was Queen of Portoviejo and Queen of the province of Manabí in 2012, participated in Miss World Ecuador 2014 winning and representing Ecuador in Miss World 2014, was selected as Top Model of the World Ecuador 2016 participating in the contest international where she figured as a semifinalist.
- Heszen Johst was Virreina of Shell Mera in 2015.
- Gabriela Jiménez was Señorita Simpatía at Reina de Quito 2016.
- Abigaíl Soria was Señorita Patronato de Ambato in 2014.
- Pouleth Hurtado was Reina de Píllaro in 2014.
- Norma Tejada is originally from Machala, but she represented the Ecuadorian community in USA.
- Blanca Arambulo is originally from Playas, but she represented the Ecuadorian community in USA.
