= Miss Ecuador 2002 =

- Date: March 26, 2002
- Venue: Teatro Centro de Arte de Guayaquil, Guayaquil, Guayas, Ecuador
- Broadcaster: Gamavisión
- Entrants: 11
- Withdrawals: Chimborazo
- Returns: Azuay and Esmeraldas
- Winner: Isabel Ontaneda; Pichincha

The Miss Ecuador 2002 was on 26th March 2002. There were 11 candidates for the national title where Isabel Ontaneda from Pichincha was crowned Miss Ecuador 2002 by her predecessor, Jéssica Bermúdez from Guayas. The winner went to compete at Miss Universe 2002 and Miss International 2002.

The venue for this event was Centro de Arte Theater, Guayaquil.

== Contestants ==
In total, there were 11 contestants that year.

The contestants of the event that year were:

- Isabel Cristina Ontaneda Pinto (Winner)
- Viviana Carbo Miranda (1st runner-up)
- María José Ortíz (2nd runner-up)
- Fátima Fuentes (3rd runner up)
- Ana Lucía Cajas
- Andrea Salvador
- Jéssica Mabel Angulo Miranda
- Karen Molina
- María Carolina Romero
- María de Lourdes Braker Toral
- Maribel Macías

== Winners ==
The winner of the competition that year was Isabel Christina Ontaneda Pinto. The award was presented presented by Jéssica Bermúdez, the winner of the Miss Ecuador 2001.
