= Miss Ecuador 2020 =

70th edition of the Miss Ecuador pageant

- Date: 17 October 2020
- Presenters: Carlos Luis Andrade; Claudia Schiess
- Entertainment: Dayanara
- Venue: Hotel Wyndham Sail, Manta, Manabí Province
- Broadcaster: Gamavisión
- Entrants: 20
- Placements: 10+1
- Debuts: Morona Santiago
- Withdrawals: Azuay; El Oro; Orellana; Santa Elena
- Returns: Imbabura; Los Ríos; Napo; Tungurahua
- Winner: Leyla Espinoza; Los Ríos

Miss Ecuador 2020 was the 70th edition of the Miss Ecuador pageant. The contest was held on 17 October, 2020 at Hotel Wyndham Sail in Manta, Manabí Province. Cristina Hidalgo from Guayas Province crowned Leyla Espinoza from Los Ríos Province as her successor at the end of the event. The winner would compete at Miss Universe 2020.

== Results ==
=== National Costume ===
Award	Contestant
Best National Costume	Esmeraldas – Daniela Mera (Andrea Segarra)
1st Runner-Up	Manabí – Nicole Loor (Wenceslao Muñoz)
2nd Runner-Up	Manabí – Valentina Mendoza (Manolo Loor)

== Contestants ==
The delegates were as follows:

Province	Contestant	Age	Height	Hometown
Esmeraldas	Nelly Betsabeth Paladines Vélez	25	1.80 m (5 ft 11 in)	Esmeraldas
Esmeraldas	Daniela Mera Palomino	25	1.73 m (5 ft 8 in)	Muisne
Galápagos	María José Córdova Guerrero	22	1.80 m (5 ft 11 in)	Puerto Baquerizo Moreno
Guayas	Keidy Zulema Boza Rendón	20	1.76 m (5 ft 9 1/2 in)	Balzar
Guayas	Doménica Shantal Maquilón Argüello	22	1.78 m (5 ft 10 in)	Guayaquil
Guayas	Daniela Alejandra Rodríguez Estéves	25	1.70 m (5 ft 7 in)	Guayaquil
Imbabura	Diana Milena Gusmán Quiñónez	24	1.68 m (5 ft 6 in)	Ibarra
Loja	Mireya Anahí Pérez Celi	23	1.74 m (5 ft 8 1/2 in)	Loja
Los Ríos	Leyla Shuken Espinoza Calvache	24	1.72 m (5 ft 7 1/2 in)	Quevedo
Los Ríos	Saskya Adela Sacasa Prado	21	1.74 m (5 ft 8 1/2 in)	Quevedo
Manabí	Mayra Nicole Loor Velásquez	23	1.75 m (5 ft 9 in)	Manta
Manabí	Andrea Nataly Zurita Gómez	25	1.69 m (5 ft 6 1/2 in)	Pedernales
Manabí	Cinthya Valentina Mendoza Loor	22	1.72 m (5 ft 7 1/2 in)	Portoviejo
Morona Santiago	Andrea Carolina Quito Torres	27	1.63 m (5 ft 4 in)	Macas
Napo	María Celeste Lozada Rubio	21	1.68 m (5 ft 6 in)	Archidona
Pichincha	Melissa Andino Ayala	20	1.70 m (5 ft 7 in)	Quito
Pichincha	María Luisa Corrales Cobos	20	1.72 m (5 ft 7 1/2 in)	Quito
Pichincha	Michelle Priscilla Sigüenza Revelo	26	1.73 m (5 ft 8 in)	Quito
Santo Domingo	Dayar Mercedes Olmedo Rubio	24	1.81 m (5 ft 11 1/2 in)	Santo Domingo
Tungurahua	Diana Aracelly Palacios Morales	26	1.76 m (5 ft 9 1/2 in)	Ambato
