= Miss Earth Ecuador 2018 =

- Date: September 29, 2018
- Venue: Centro de Convenciones Mall del Río, Cuenca, Azuay
- Broadcaster: Telerama
- Entrants: 12
- Placements: 6
- Debuts: Chimborazo; Orellana; Tungurahua
- Withdrawals: Esmeraldas
- Winner: Diana Valdivieso; Manabí
- Congeniality: Paulette Sánchez; El Oro
- Best National Costume: Diana Valdivieso; Manabí
- Photogenic: Jocelyn Mieles; Manabí

Miss Earth Ecuador 2018 was the 2nd edition of Miss Earth Ecuador pageant. The election night was held September 29, 2018 in Cuenca where Lessie Giler from Manabí crowned Diana Valdivieso from Manabí as well. The winner represented Ecuador at Miss Earth 2018 pageant.

== Results ==
=== Placements ===
Placement	Contestant
Miss Earth Ecuador 2018	Manabí – Diana Valdivieso
Miss Air Ecuador 2018	Manabí – Jocelyn Mieles
Miss Water Ecuador 2018	Chimborazo – Andrea Idrobo
Miss Fire Ecuador 2018	El Oro – Paulette Sánchez
Top 6	Guayas – Krystel Limones; Manabí – Melanie Burgos

=== Special awards ===
Award	Contestant
Miss Congeniality	El Oro – Paulette Sánchez
Miss Photogenic	Manabí – Jocelyn Mieles
Miss Environment	Chimborazo – Andrea Idrobo
Best Skin	Orellana – Raiza Ortega
Best Smile	Manabí – Jocelyn Mieles
Best Ecologic Costume	Manabí – Diana Valdivieso

== Contestants ==
Twelve contestants competed for the title.

Province	Contestant	Age	Height	Hometown
Azuay	Shirley Magdalena Lucero Delgado	23	1.70 m (5 ft 7 in)	Cuenca
Chimborazo	Andrea Fernanda Hidrobo Nina	19	1.69 m (5 ft 6 1/2 in)	Riobamba
El Oro	Laura Paulette Sánchez Espinoza	20	1.72 m (5 ft 7 1/2 in)	Huaquillas
El Oro	Julieth González Rojas	19	1.71 m (5 ft 7 1/2 in)	Machala
Guayas	Camila Krystel Limones Junco	18	1.72 m (5 ft 7 1/2 in)	Guayaquil
Guayas	Laura Cristina Sempértegui Ortega	23	1.73 m (5 ft 8 in)	Guayaquil
Manabí	Melanie Burgos Palacios	18	1.70 m (5 ft 7 in)	Manta
Manabí	Jocelyn Daniela Mieles Zambrano	24	1.75 m (5 ft 9 in)	Manta
Manabí	Diana Nicole Valdivieso Ortíz	20	1.82 m (5 ft 11 1/2 in)	Portoviejo
Orellana	Raiza Ortega Bravo	22	1.69 m (5 ft 6 1/2 in)	Coca
Santo Domingo	María Camila Espinosa Paz	19	1.70 m (5 ft 7 in)	Santo Domingo
Tungurahua	Andrea Maribel Merino Guerrero	21	1.85 m (6 ft 1 in)	Ambato

== Notes ==
=== Debuts ===
- Chimborazo
- Orellana
- Tungurahua

=== Withdrawals ===
- Esmeraldas

=== Replacements ===
- Tungurahua - María Emilia Alvarado Arellano

=== Did not compete ===
- Pichincha - Pía Chiriboga

== Crossovers ==
- Jocelyn Mieles competed at Miss Ecuador 2017 where she was 1st Runner-up. Also, she competed at Miss International 2017 where she placed into the Top 8.
