= Miss Ecuador 2000 =

- Date: April 6, 2000
- Venue: Teatro Centro de Arte, Guayaquil, Guayas, Ecuador
- Broadcaster: Gamavisión
- Entrants: 11
- Withdrawals: Bolívar, Cañar, Chimborazo, Cotopaxi, Galápagos, Los Ríos, Napo, Pastaza and Tungurahua
- Winner: Gabriela Cadena; Guayas

The Miss Ecuador 2000 was held on April 6, 2000. There were 11 candidates for the national title; in the end of the night Carolina Alfonso from Pichincha crowned to Gabriela Cadena from Guayas as Miss Ecuador 2000. The Miss Ecuador compete at Miss Universe 2000.

== Contestants ==
Country	Contestant	Age	Height (cm)	Height (ft in)	Hometown
Azuay	Viviana Arévalo	19	170	5 ft 7 in	Cuenca
El Oro	Marcela Córdova	19	172	5 ft 8 in	Machala
Guayas	Gabriela Mercedes Cadena Vedova	21	172	5 ft 8 in	Guayaquil
Guayas	Rosangela Mosquera Monroy	19	175	5 ft 9 in	Guayaquil
Guayas	Carla Gafter Del Campo	19	174	5 ft 9 in	Guayaquil
Guayas	Andrea Torres Enz	18	176	5 ft 9 in	Guayaquil
Guayas	María Sol Galarza	18	172	5 ft 8 in	Guayaquil
Guayas	Verónica Zambrano Ortega	20	172	5 ft 8 in	Guayaquil
Imbabura	Paola Yánez Estrella	21	172	5 ft 8 in	Ibarra
Manabí	Ana Dolores Murillo Sánchez	22	178	5 ft 10 in	Portoviejo
Pichincha	Gabriela Espinoza Calle	19	175	5 ft 9 in	Quito
