= Miss World Ecuador 2018 =

- Date: June 23, 2018
- Presenters: Danilo Carrera, and Andrea Villacrés
- Venue: Teatro Centro Cívico Eloy Alfaro, Guayaquil, Guayas
- Broadcaster: RTS
- Entrants: 15
- Placements: 8
- Withdrawals: Chimborazo, Galápagos, Orellana, and Pastza
- Returns: Cañar, Imbabura, Loja, and Santo Domingo
- Winner: Nicol Ocles; Imbabura

Miss World Ecuador 2018, the 6th edition of the Miss World Ecuador was held on June 13, 2018, in Guayaquil, Ecuador. Romina Zeballos from Guayas crowned Nicol Ocles as her successor, Miss World Ecuador 2018. She competed at Miss World 2018.The contest was directed by Tahíz Panús, and Julián Pico was the general producer. The 1st Runner-up, Carla Prado from Guayas was selected to compete at Miss Supranational 2018.

== Results ==
=== Placements ===
Final results	Contestant
Miss World Ecuador 2018	Imbabura - Nicol Ocles
Miss Supranational Ecuador 2018	Guayas - Carla Prado
Miss Intercontinental Ecuador 2018	Manabí- Nina Solórzano
Top 8	Cañar - Camila Bernal; El Oro - Odalis Guncay; Esmeraldas - Raixa Farías; Santo Domingo - Stephany Sánchez; Tungurahua - Nicole Brito

== International Representation ==
Contestants	Pageant	Venue	International Placement	Awards and Special achievements
Imbabura - Nicol Ocles	Miss World 2018	China, Sanya	Unplaced	Top 24 Miss World Sports; Top 30 Dances Of the World
Guayas - Carla Prado	Miss Supranational 2018	Poland, Krynica-Zdrój	Top 26	Top 16 Beautiful Piece of Jewelry
Manabí- Nina Solórzano	Miss Intercontinental 2018	Philippines, Manila	Top 20	

=== Fast Track ===
Award	Contestant
Miss Photogenic	El Oro - Odalis Guncay
Miss Ladysoft (Best Skin)	Guayas - Carla Prado
Miss Catwalk	Pichincha - Jéssica Viteri
Miss Hype	Guayas - Carla Prado
Miss Sport	Imbabura - Nicol Ocles
Miss Model	El Oro - Odalis Guncay
Miss Talent	El Oro - Odalis Guncay
Miss Head to Head	Loja - Cristina Espinoza
Beauty With a purpose	Cotopaxi - Monserrath Romero
Beach Beauty	Manabí - Nina Solórzano
Best in Dances of Ecuador	Tungurahua - Nicole Brito

== Fast Track Results ==
=== Miss Top Model ===
Results	Contestants
Miss Top Model	El Oro - Odalis Guncay
1st Runner-Up	Guayas - Carla Prado
2nd Runner-Up	Esmeraldas - Raixa Faría

=== Miss Sports ===
Results	Contestants
Miss Sports	Imbabura - Nicol Ocles
1st Runner-Up	Guayas - Carla Prado; Morona Santiago - Jennifer Soza
2nd Runner-Up	Cañar - Camila Bernal; Los Ríos - Roxana Palacios

=== Miss Beach Beauty ===
Results	Contestants
Miss Beach Beauty	Manabí - Nina Solórzano
1st Runner-Up	Pichincha - Jéssica Viteri
2nd Runner-Up	Cañar - Camila Bernal

=== Best in Dances of Ecuador ===
Results	Contestants
Best in Dances of Ecuador	Tungurahua - Shirley Brito
1st Runner-Up	Morona Santiago - Jennifer Soza
2nd Runner-Up	Cañar - Camila Bernal

=== Miss Head to Head Challenge ===
Results	Contestants
Miss Head to Head Challenge	Loja - Cristina Espinoza
1st Runner-Up	Manabí - Nina Solórzano
2nd Runner-Up	Cañar - Camila Bernal

=== Miss Beauty With a Purpose ===
Results	Contestants
Miss Beauty With a Purpose	Cotopaxi - Monserrath Romero
Top 8	Azuay - Betsabeth Heredia; Esmeraldas - Raixa Faría; Guayas - Carla Prado; Loja - Cristina Espinoza; Manabí - Nina Solórzano; Pichincha - Jéssica Viteri; Tungurahua - Shirley Brito

== Contestants ==
Province/City	Contestant
Azuay	Betsabeth Heredia
Cañar	Camila Bernal
Cotopaxi	Monserrath Romero
El Oro	Odalis Guncay
Esmeraldas	Raixa Farías
Guayas	Carla Prado
Imbabura	Nicol Ocles
Loja	Cristina Espinoza
Los Ríos	Roxana Palacios
Morona Santiago	Viviana Jaramillo
Pichincha	Jéssica Viteri
Santa Elena	Nayeli García
Santo Domingo	Stephany Sánchez
Tungurahua	Nicole Brito

== Notes ==
=== Returns ===
Last compete in:

- 2013
  - Cañar
  - Imbabura
- 2015
  - Loja
  - Santo Domingo

=== Withdrawals ===
- Chimborazo
- Galápagos
- Orellana
- Pastaza

=== Replacements ===
- Loja - Andrea Burneo
- Santa Elena - Sheyla Tello

== Crossovers ==
- Betsabeth Heredia competed at Reina de Cuenca 2017, but she was unplaced.
- Carla Prado competed at Miss Ecuador 2014 where she was 2nd Runner-up, giving her the right to compete at Miss International 2014, but she was unplaced.
- Nayeli García was Virreina de La Libertad 2018 (2nd place).
- Stephany Sánchez was Virreina de Santo Domingo 2017 (2nd place. Also, she won Reina Mundial del Banano Ecuador 2017 and competed at Reina Mundial del Banano 2017 where she finished 1st Runner-up (3rd place).
