= Miss Ecuador 1999 =

- Date: April 16, 1999
- Venue: Teatro Nacional de la Casa de la Cultura, Quito, Pichincha, Ecuador
- Broadcaster: Gamavisión
- Entrants: 19
- Debuts: Cañar
- Returns: Azuay, Bolívar, Cotopaxi, El Oro, Galápagos, Imbabura, Pastaza, Napo and Tungurahua
- Winner: Carolina Alfonso; Pichincha

The Miss Ecuador 1999 was held on April 16, 1999. There were 19 candidates for the national title; at the end of the night Soraya Hogonaga from Pichincha crowned Carolina Alfonso from Pichincha as Miss Ecuador 1999. The Miss Ecuador competed at Miss Universe 1999.
