= Miss Ecuador 2024 =

Beauty contest

- Date: August 17, 2024
- Presenters: Carlos Luis Andrade; Claudia Schiess
- Venue: Salinas Golf & Tennis Club, Salinas, Santa Elena, Ecuador
- Broadcaster: Vito TVO
- Entrants: 21
- Placements: 10
- Debuts: Argentina Community; Colombia Community
- Withdrawals: Azuay; Bolívar; Cañar; Chimborazo; Cotopaxi; Galápagos; Italy Community; Pastaza; Pichincha; Santo Domingo; USA Community
- Returns: Los Ríos; Santa Elena
- Winner: Eunice Rivadeneira; Guayas
- Congeniality: Nohely Bravo (Guayas)
- Best National Costume: Mariuxi Narváez (Guayas)

Miss Ecuador 2024 was the 74th edition of the Miss Ecuador pageant, held at the Salinas Golf & Tennis Club in Salinas, Ecuador, on August 17, 2024.

At the end of the event, Eunice Rivadeneira of Guayaquil was crowned Miss Ecuador 2024. Rivadeneira will represent Ecuador at Miss International 2025. This will be the first time that the Miss Ecuador titleholder will compete at Miss International since 1967.

== Results ==
=== Placements ===
Placement	Contestant
Miss Ecuador 2024	Guayas – Eunices Rivadeneira
1st Runner-Up	Guayas – Galia García
2nd Runner-Up	Los Ríos – Dagmar Prieto
3rd Runner-Up	Manabí – Romina Murillo
4th Runner-Up	Imbabura – Melany Padilla
5th Runner-Up	Guayas – Isabella Sotomayo
Top 10	Argentina – Naomi Viteri; El Oro – Ariana Mendoza; Guayas – Mariana Narváez; Los Ríos – Anais Rodríguez

=== Special awards ===
Award	Contestant
Best National Costume	Guayas – Mariuxi Narváez
Miss Congeniality	Guayas – Nohely Bravo
Miss Cielo	Guayas – Eunices Rivadeneira

=== Best National Costume ===
Award	Contestant
Best National Costume	Guayas – Mariuxi Narváez (Joseph Lara)
1st Runner-Up	Guayas – Eunices Rivadeneira (Carlos Aguilar)
2nd Runner-Up	Manabí – Romina Murillo (Manolo Loor)

== Contestants ==
There are 21 official delegates to compete at Miss Ecuador 2024:

Province	Contestant	Age (Note: Ages at the time of the pageant)	Hometown
Argentina Community	Pilar Ceballos Espín	18	Córdoba
Colombia Community	María Clara Ramírez Duque	22	Medellín
El Oro	Ariana Belén Mendoza Pizarro	23	Machala
El Oro	María Paula Villacís Espinoza	23	Machala
Guayas	Carla Denisse Giler Taylor	22	Duran
Guayas	Melanie Rodríguez Guerrero	21	El Empalme
Guayas	Galia García Gagliardoo	26	Guayaquil
Guayas	Camila Lara Rivero	18	Guayaquil
Guayas	Eunice Alexandra Rivadeneira Bermeo	24	Guayaquil
Guayas	Isabella Sotomayor Macias	20	Guayaquil
Guayas	Nohely Bravo Palma	21	Jujan
Guayas	Mariana Narváez Bustamante	26	Naranjal
Imbabura	Melany Padilla Ayovi	23	Ibarra
Loja	Dayerly Estefany Cevallos Mogrovejo	21	Loja
Los Ríos	Karely Ibarra Paredes	23	Mocache
Los Ríos	Anais Rodríguez Durango	21	Quevedo
Los Ríos	Dagmar Prieto Mera	24	San Camilo
Manabí	Joselyn Arianna Pinargote Merchán	24	Jipijapa
Manabí	Romina Murillo Loor	25	Manta
Santa Elena	Melany Selene Flores López	23	Salinas
Santa Elena	Karla Zambrano Tomala	22	Salinas

=== Withdrawals ===
- Guayas - Nathalia Salazar Bajaña
