= Miss World Ecuador 2015 =

- Date: August 1, 2015
- Presenters: Cinthya Coppiano; Ronald Farina
- Venue: Centro de Convenciones Simón Bolívar, Guayaquil, Guayas
- Broadcaster: TC Televisión
- Entrants: 13
- Placements: 5
- Debuts: Loja; Morona-Santiago; Santa Elena
- Withdrawals: Pichincha
- Returns: Santo Domingo; Tungurahua
- Winner: Camila Marañón; Manabí

Miss World Ecuador 2015 was the third Miss World Ecuador pageant, held at the Centro de Convenciones Simón Bolívar in Guayaquil, Ecuador, on August 1, 2015.

Virginia Limongi of Manabí crowned Camila Marañón of Manabí as her successor at the end of the event.

== Results ==
=== Placements ===
Placement	Contestant
Miss World Ecuador 2015	Manabí – Camila Marañón
1st Runner-Up	Azuay – Cristina Vintimilla
2nd Runner-Up	Tungurahua – Vanessa Kattan
3rd Runner-Up	Cotopaxi – Priscilla Naranjo
4th Runner-Up	Guayas – Lissette Guillén

=== Special awards ===
Award	Contestant
Miss Photogenic	Manabí – Camila Marañón
Miss Congeniality	Los Ríos – Susan Punín
Miss Esplandor	Manabí – Camila Marañón
Miss Smile	Santo Domingo – Andrea Vizuete
Best National Costume	Manabí – Camila Marañón

== Contestants ==
Thirteen contestants competed for the title.

Province	Contestant	Age	Height (cm)	Height (ft)	Hometown
Azuay	María Cristina Vintimilla Corral	22	167	5'6"	Cuenca
Cotopaxi	Priscilla Alexandra Naranjo Semanate	18	167	5'6"	Latacunga
Esmeraldas	Brigitte Viviana Yaguachi Valencia	20	179	5'11	Esmeraldas
Guayas	Lissette Madelayne Guillén Enríquez	23	170	5'7"	Guayaquil
Guayas	Ariana Isabel Morales Villavicencio	18	168	5'7"	Guayaquil
Guayas	Fiorella Melissa Thoret Lamota	18	170	5'8"	Guayaquil
Los Ríos	Susan del Carmen Punín Fabre	20	167	5'5"	Babahoyo
Loja	Jéssica Maragarita Luna Ocampo	19	168	5'6"	Loja
Manabí	María Camila Marañón Solórzano	20	173	5'8"	Chone
Morona-Santiago	Jhomara Rosenda Montero Piña	21	169	5'7"	Sucúa
Santa Elena	Susana Nicoll Rivera Pintado	20	167	5'6"	Santa Elena
Santo Domingo	Andrea Jeaninne Vizuete Vásquez	23	170	5'7"	Santo Domingo
Tungurahua	María Vanessa Kattán Chacón	25	165	5'5"	Ambato

== Notes ==
=== Debuts ===
- Loja
- Morona Santiago
- Santa Elena

=== Returns ===
Last compete in:

- 2013
  - Santo Domingo
  - Tungurahua

=== Withdraws ===
- Pichincha

== Crossovers ==
- Cristina Vintimilla was Reina de Cuenca 2013.
- Priscilla Naranjo was Reina de Latacunga 2012.
- Viviana Yaguachi competed at Reina de Esmeraldas 2013 but she was unplaced.
- Susan Punin was the 1st Runner-up (Virreina) at Reina de Babahoyo 2015.
- Camila Marañón was Reina de Chone 2013, and earlier in 2015 she withdrew from the pageant Miss Ecuador 2015.
- Jhomara Montero was Reina de Sucúa 2010 and Reina de Morona Santiago 2010.
- Vanessa Kattan was Reina de Ambato 2014 and Reina Mundial de la Rosa 2015
