= Miss Ecuador 2017 =

Beauty pageant edition

- Date: April 22, 2017
- Presenters: Carlos Montero; Claudia Schiess; Francesca Cipriani
- Entertainment: Juan Fernando Velasco
- Venue: El Chorrillo Complex, Babahoyo, Los Ríos
- Broadcaster: Gamavisión
- Entrants: 22
- Placements: 10
- Withdrawals: Azuay; El Oro; Pastaza; Santa Elena; USA Community
- Returns: Cotopaxi; Manabí; Imbabura; Santo Domingo
- Winner: Daniela Cepeda; Guayas
- Congeniality: Joselyn Mieles (Manabi)
- Best National Costume: Joselyn Mieles (Manabí)
- Photogenic: Joselyn Mieles (Manabi)

Miss Ecuador 2017, the 67th Miss Ecuador pageant, was held on April 22, 2017 in Babahoyo, Los Ríos. Connie Jiménez, Miss Ecuador 2016 from Los Ríos crowned her successor Daniela Cepeda from Guayas at the end of the event. The winner represented Ecuador at Miss Universe 2017.

== Results ==
=== Placements ===
Placement	Contestant
Miss Ecuador 2017; Miss Universe Ecuador 2017	Guayas – Daniela Cepeda
1st Runner-Up; Miss International Ecuador 2017	Manabí – Jocelyn Mieles
2nd Runner-Up; Miss Grand Ecuador 2017	Imbabura – María José Villacís (Resigned)
3rd Runner-Up	Guayas – Dayanara Peralta
4th Runner-Up	Los Ríos – Rossie Torres
5th Runner-Up	Chimborazo – Nicole Hidalgo
Top 10	Guayas – Mónica González; Guayas – Sofía Peñafiel; Guayas – Génesis Parra; Manabí – Katheryne López

=== Special awards ===
Award	Contestant
Miss Congeniality	Manabí - Jocelyn Mieles
Miss Photogenic	Manabí - Jocelyn Mieles
Miss Puntuality	Santo Domingo - Marjorie Vivas
Miss Cielo	Guayas - Dayanara Peralta
Miss Popularity	Guayas - Dayanara Peralta
Miss Ottie	Imbabura - María José Villacís
Best National Costume	Manabí - Jocelyn Mieles

=== Best National Costume ===
Award	Contestant
Best National Costume	Manabí - Jocelyn Mieles (Wenceslao Muñoz)
1st Runner-up	Guayas - Mónica González (Gustavo Otero)
2nd Runner-up	Guayas - Dayanara Peralta (Carlos Aguilar)

== Contestants ==
Province	Contestant	Age	Height (cm)	Height (ft in)	Hometown
Chimborazo	Johanna Nicole Hidalgo Silva	23	179	5 ft 10 in	Riobamba
Cotopaxi	Ana Gabriela Caicedo Toro	23	170	5 ft 7 in	Pujilí
Esmeraldas	Helary Estupiñán Mina	24	174	5 ft 9 in	San Lorenzo
Guayas	Bianca Nicole Benavides Noriega	22	172	5 ft 8 in	Guayaquil
Guayas	María Daniela Cepeda Matamoros	21	173	5 ft 8 in	Guayaquil
Guayas	Mónica Leticia González Echeverría	25	172	5 ft 8 in	Guayaquil
Guayas	Sofía Gabriela Peñafiel Torres	25	172	5 ft 8 in	Guayaquil
Guayas	Dayanara Mishelle Peralta Loor	20	172	5 ft 8 in	Guayaquil
Guayas	María Belén Ruíz Velasco	25	174	5 ft 9 in	Guayaquil
Guayas	Génesis Stefanía Parra Pico	18	171	5 ft 7 in	Naranjal
Imbabura	María José Villacís Avendaño	22	173	5 ft 8 in	Ibarra
Loja	Zully Alejandra Granda Jaramillo	24	170	5 ft 7 in	Alamor
Los Ríos	Mirna Yalena Avilés Cercado	23	172	5 ft 8 in	Vinces
Los Ríos	Rossie Alegría Torres Cadena	21	173	5 ft 8 in	Quevedo
Los Ríos	María Fernanda Muñoz Jiménez	23	172	5 ft 8 in	Vinces
Manabí	Jocelyn Daniela Mieles Zambrano	22	175	5 ft 9 in	Manta
Manabí	Katheryne Eliana López España	23	172	5 ft 8 in	Pedernales
Manabí	Laura Mercedes Macías Vélez	21	173	5 ft 8 in	Santa Ana
Manabí	Corina Isabel Zambrano Valderrama	20	175	5 ft 9 in	Tosagua
Pichincha	Wendy Carolina Carrillo Morales	22	170	5 ft 7 in	Quito
Pichincha	Analía Viviana Vernaza Daulón (Assumed MG'17)	23	172	5 ft 8 in	Quito
Santo Domingo	Marjorie Marlene Vivas Medranda	22	173	5 ft 8 in	Santo Domingo
