= Santa Elena Canton =

- Canton
- Location of Santa Elena Province in Ecuador.

- Santa Elena Canton in Santa Elena Province
- Coordinates: 2.2267°S 80.8583°W
- Country: Ecuador
- Province: Santa Elena Province

Area
  - Total: 3,598 km^{2} (1,389 sq mi)

Population (2022 census)
  - Total: 186,687
  - Density: 51.89/km^{2} (134.4/sq mi)
- Time zone: UTC-5 (ECT)
- Website: www.santaelena.gob.ec

Santa Elena Canton is a canton of Ecuador, located in the Santa Elena Province. Its capital is the city of Santa Elena. Its population at the 2010 census was 144,076.

== Demographics ==
Ethnic groups as of the Ecuadorian census of 2010:

- Mestizo 79.4%
- Afro-Ecuadorian 7.6%
- Montubio 5.6%
- White 2.5%
- Indigenous 2.0%
- Other 2.9%
