= Guillermo Arduino =

Argentinian journalist (born 1964)

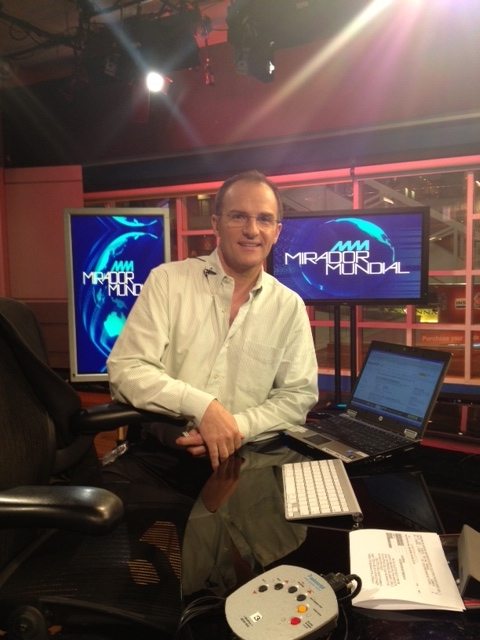
- Born: December 2, 1964 (age 61); Buenos Aires, Argentina
- Occupations: CNN Anchor and Correspondent (1999–2021)

Guillermo Arduino (born December 2, 1964) is an Argentinian journalist who worked for CNN as anchor and correspondent. Arduino was the host of Encuentro on CNN en Español and Clix, a tech show on CNN en Español from 1999 to 2021.

== Early life and career ==
Arduino was born in 1964 and raised in Buenos Aires, Argentina. He attended the Instituto Superior de Enseñanza de Radiodifusión, Instituto Nacional Superior del Profesorado en Lenguas Vivas "Juan Ramón Fernandez". He began working in the radio and television industry at the age of twenty-five, eventually becoming the host of a nightly news program in Argentina on CVN-America TV.

== Career in the United States ==
In 1995, he worked as a news anchor for a breakfast show on NBC's International Language TV News Station Canal de Noticias. At NBC he interviewed world leaders and covered US Presidential elections. Starting in 1997, Arduino worked as an on-air meteorologist and show presenter for The Weather Channel. He then became a member of CNN's weather team as an international weather anchor. In 2002, he became an anchor for CNN World View and served as anchor during the Iraq War and the War in Afghanistan.

Since 2008, Arduino has been the host of Clix, a weekly tech show on CNN en Español and CNN Latino. In December 2011, Arduino left the weather team of CNN International to assume his new role as CNN anchor and correspondent. Since then he has become the host and anchor of the weekend news show Mirador Mundial. At CNN International he has also hosted Global Challenges and is the anchor of the CNN en Español technology news show Clix. He was nominated for the 2014 Daytime Emmy Award in 2016. In 2015 he was named an Embajador de la Creatividad by the University of Palermo in Buenos Aires.

During the beginning of the CNN en Español program Encuentro on Tuesday, July 16, 2019, Arduino stated:

"Two days ago it was the nineteenth anniversary of the death of my mother, a sudden cancer that she endured with unwavering stoicism; she said that when I died I wouldn't know what would become of my Father... and he left, only months later."

After 22 years, Guillermo Arduino left the American network CNN en Español in 2021.
