= Chone Canton =

Coordinates: 0°41′S 80°06′W

- Canton
- Location of Manabí Province in Ecuador.

- Chone Canton in Manabí Province
- Country: Ecuador
- Province: Manabí Province
- Capital: Chone

Area
  - Total: 3,063 km^{2} (1,183 sq mi)

Population (2022 census)
  - Total: 128,166
  - Density: 41.84/km^{2} (108.4/sq mi)
- Time zone: UTC-5 (ECT)

Chone Canton is a canton of Ecuador, located in the Manabí Province. Its capital is the town of Chone. Its population at the 2001 census was 117,634.

== Demographics ==
Ethnic groups as of the Ecuadorian census of 2010:

- Mestizo 68.8%
- Montubio 20.4%
- Afro-Ecuadorian 6.4%
- White 4.1%
- Indigenous 0.1%
- Other 0.2%
