= Miss Ecuador 2014 =

Beauty pageant edition

- Date: March 15, 2014
- Presenters: Roberto Angeleli; Paola Sánchez
- Venue: Teatro Centro Cívico de Guayaquil, Guayaquil, Guayas
- Broadcaster: Gama TV
- Entrants: 20
- Placements: 6
- Debuts: Orellana; Sucumbíos
- Withdrawals: Galápagos; Los Ríos
- Returns: Azuay; Esmeraldas; Santa Elena
- Winner: Alejandra Argudo; Manabí

Miss Ecuador 2014, the 64th Miss Ecuador pageant, was held on March 15, 2014. Constanza Báez from Pichincha crowned her successor Alejandra Argudo from Manabí as Miss Ecuador 2014. It was broadcast on Gama TV.

The winner represented Ecuador at Miss Universe 2014, while the first runner-up participated in Miss International 2014 and the second runner-up competed in Miss Supranational 2014. The other finalists entered in various minor international pageants.

Although it was planned to be streamed over Xbox Live to Ecuadorian communities abroad, this arrangement was cancelled to avoid interrupting Titanfall players from their games.

== Results ==
=== Placements ===
Placement	Contestant
Miss Ecuador 2014; Miss Universe Ecuador 2014	Manabí – Alejandra Argudo
Miss International Ecuador 2014	Esmeraldas – Inés Panchano(Unable to compete)
2nd Runner-Up	Santa Elena – Carla Prado(Assumed MI'14)
3rd Runner-Up	Pichincha – Estefanía Londoño
4th Runner-Up	Manabí – Dianella López
5th Runner-Up	Guayas – Francys Caicedo

=== Special awards ===
Award	Contestant
Miss Congeniality	Guayas – Sofía Baquerizo
Miss Photogenic	Santo Domingo – María Teresa Zavala
Miss Sedal	Manabí – Alejandra Argudo
Miss Puntuality	Santo Domingo – María Teresa Zavala
Miss Cielo	Santa Elena – Carla Prado
Miss Yanbal	Loja – Ángeles Jaramillo
Miss Kotex	Manabí – Dianella López
Miss Elegance	Manabí – Alejandra Argudo
Best National Costume	Santa Elena – Carla Prado

=== Best National Costume ===
Award	Contestant
Best National Costume	Santa Elena – Carla Prado (Gustavo Otero)
1st Runner-Up	El Oro – Karen Armijos (Carlos Aguilar)
2nd Runner-Up	Manabí – Karen Paredes (Wenseslao Muñoz); Manabí – Alejandra Argudo (Luis Tipán)

== Contestants ==
Province	Contestant	Age	Height (cm)	Height (ft in)	Hometown
Azuay	Alexandra Álvarez Idrovo	24	173	5 ft 8 in	Cuenca
El Oro	Karen Michelle Armijos Chiriboga	19	173	5 ft 8 in	Pasaje
Esmeraldas	Inés Carolina Panchano Lara	28	175	5 ft 9 in	Esmeraldas
Guayas	Martha María Romero Camposano	21	175	5 ft 9 in	Nobol
Guayas	Francis Caicedo Corozo	24	170	5 ft 7 in	Guayaquil
Guayas	Sofía Baquerizo Medina	19	174	5 ft 9 in	Guayaquil
Guayas	Sylvia Samira Samán Jiménez	25	170	5 ft 7 in	Guayaquil
Guayas	Catherine Roxana Vergara Argudo	22	178	5 ft 10 in	Guayaquil
Guayas	Denisse Paola Guillén Martínez	21	173	5 ft 8 in	Milagro
Guayas	Irene Zabala Jaramillo	24	180	5 ft 11 in	Guayaquil
Loja	María Ángeles Jaramillo Ludeña	22	173	5 ft 8 in	Loja
Manabí	Dianella López Dueñas	19	180	5 ft 11 in	Portoviejo
Manabí	Alejandra Argudo	22	178	5 ft 10 in	Portoviejo
Manabí	Karen Lissette Paredes Cantos	21	178	5 ft 10 in	Portoviejo
Orellana	Lidia Marisol Veloz Alvarado	19	180	5 ft 11 in	El Coca
Pichincha	Valeria Ojeda Dávila	23	180	5 ft 11 in	Quito
Pichincha	Estefanía Londoño Monroy	24	175	5 ft 9 in	Quito
Santa Elena	Carla Prado Thoret	19	176	5 ft 9 in	Salinas
Santo Domingo	María Teresa Zavala Saldarreaga	24	170	5 ft 7 in	Santo Domingo
Sucumbíos	Diana Pereira Gálvez	23	170	5 ft 7 in	Lago Agrio

== Notes ==
=== Debuts ===
- Orellana
- Sucumbíos

=== Returns ===
Last compete in:

- 2012
  - Azuay
  - Esmeraldas
  - Santa Elena

=== Withdraws ===
- Galapagos
- Los Ríos
