= Miss Ecuador 2015 =

Beauty pageant edition

- Date: March 14, 2015
- Presenters: Carlos Montero; Paola Sánchez
- Venue: Centro de Convenciones Simon Bolivar de Guayaquil Guayaquil, Guayas
- Broadcaster: Gama TV
- Entrants: 18
- Placements: 6
- Withdrawals: Manabí; Orellana; Santa Elena; Sucumbíos
- Returns: Carchi; Cotopaxi; Chimborazo; Imbabura; Tungurahua
- Winner: Francesca Cipriani; Guayas
- Congeniality: Maria Elisa Padilla (Azuay)
- Best National Costume: Maria Elisa Padilla (Azuay)
- Photogenic: María de los Ángeles Espín (Cotopaxi)

Miss Ecuador 2015, the 65th Miss Ecuador pageant, was held on March 14, 2015. Alejandra Argudo, Miss Ecuador 2014 from Manabí crowned her successor Francesca Cipriani from Guayas as Miss Ecuador 2015. The winner represented Ecuador at Miss Universe 2015, the 1st Runner-up competed at Miss International 2015, and the 2nd Runner participated at Miss Supranational 2015.
