= Gamavisión =

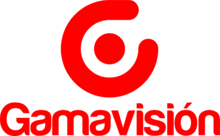
- Type: Terrestrial television network
- Country: Ecuador
- Broadcast area: Ecuador

Programming
- Language: Spanish
- Picture format: 1080i HDTV

Ownership
- Owner: Comunica EP (95%); Workers of the channel(5%)

History
- Launched: April 18, 1977
- Founder: Marcel Rivas Sáenz
- Former names: Telenacional (1977-1984); GamaTV (2008-2016); Gama (2016-2017)

Links
- Website: https://www.gamavision.com.ec/

Availability

Terrestrial
- Analog VHF: Channel 2 (Quito); Channel 8 (Guayaquil)
- Digital VHF: Channel 2.1 (Quito); Channel 8.1 (Guayaquil)

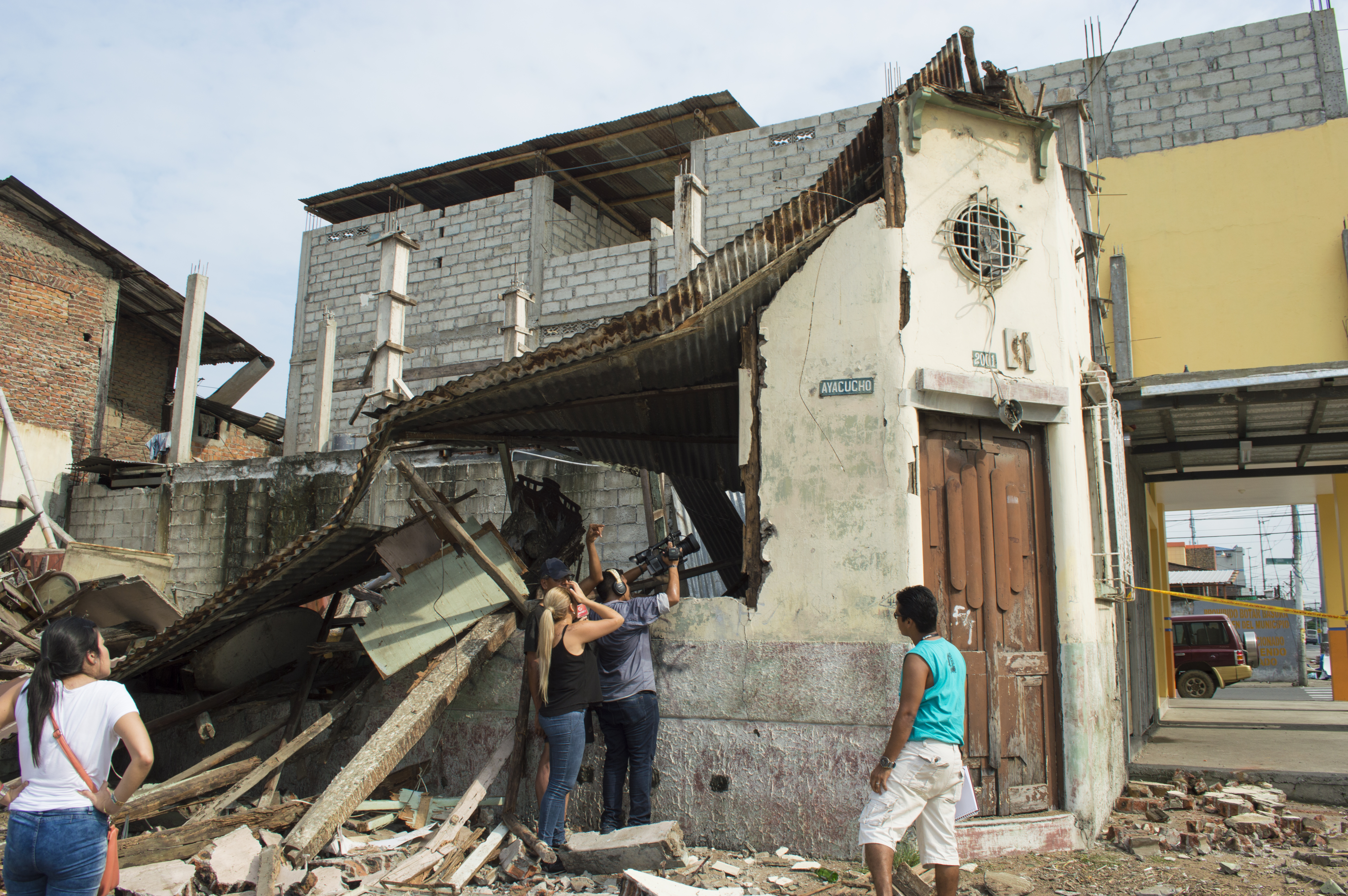
A GamaTV team documents the effects of the 2016 Ecuador earthquake

Gamavisión is a state-owned Ecuadorian television network. The network was one of Televisa's partners in Ecuador until 2016. The network belongs to financial Group Isaías and is owned by Company Teledos SA Pacific TV.

== History ==
The channel was founded in 1967 as Telenacional by Gerardo Berborich in 1967 and transferred control to Marcel Rivas in 1977, who launched the station on April 18, 1977.The station broadcasts as Channel 2 in Quito, Channel 8 in Guayaquil and Channel 9 in Cuenca. In March 1978 the station was broadcasting a newscast presented by journalist Diego Oquendo.

Following the state intervention of Grupo Isaías' assets, reports appeared claiming that the channel wasn't owned by the conglomerate.

In 2014, the channel suppressed the broadcast rights on Ecuadorian over-the-air television of The Simpsons, as well as local comedy program No Noticias, due to lack of funds.

After a period of nearly a decade under the names Gama TV and Gama, the channel reverted to its longtime name on October 16, 2017. The rename came after a case study revealed that viewers still referred to the channel by its former name.

The channel has been deteriorating since the 2008 state intervention and had four liquidators as of early September 2024.
