= Miss World Ecuador 2013 =

Beauty pageant

- Date: July 4, 2013
- Presenters: Cynthia Coppiano; Ronald Farina
- Venue: Centro Cultural Libertador Simón Bolívar, Guayaquil, Guayas, Ecuador
- Broadcaster: TC Televisión
- Entrants: 16
- Placements: 5
- Debuts: Bolívar; Cañar; El Oro; Esmeraldas; Guayas; Imbabura; Los Ríos; Manabí; Pichincha; Santo Domingo; Tungurahua
- Winner: Laritza Párraga; Santo Domingo

Miss World Ecuador 2013 was the first Miss World Ecuador pageant, held at the Centro Cultural Libertador Simón Bolívar in Guayaquil, Ecuador, on July 4, 2013.

At the end of the night Laritza Párraga of Santo Domingo was crowned Miss World Ecuador 2013 and competed at Miss World 2013 in Bali, Indonesia.

== Results ==
=== Placements ===
Placement	Contestant
Miss World Ecuador 2013	Santo Domingo – Laritza Párraga
1st Runner-Up	Tungurahua – Daniela Guerrero
2nd Runner-Up	Bolívar – Stefanía Camacho
3rd Runner-Up	Esmeraldas – Ariana Vilela
4th Runner-Up	Manabí – Emilia Díaz

=== Special awards ===
Award	Contestant
Miss Photogenic	Santo Domingo – Laritza Párraga
Miss Congeniality	Guayas – Carolina Wray
Miss Talent	Cañar – Katherine Espín
Miss Sedal	Guayas – Ginnette Wong
Miss Zlimmy	Manabí – Emilia Díaz
Miss Smile	Bolívar – Stefanía Camacho
Miss TcTv	Bolívar – Stefanía Camacho
Best National Costume	Santo Domingo – Laritza Párraga

== Judges ==
- Pierina Correa
- Carlos Coello
- Isabel Novoa
- Raúl Del Sol
- Soledad Diab – Miss Ecuador 1992
- Aníbal Marrero
- Susana Rivadeneira – Miss Ecuador 2004
- Álvaro Fernández
- Juliette Villa
- Rolando Panchana

== Contestants ==
Sixteen contestants competed for the title.

Province	Contestant	Age	Height (cm)	Height (ft)	Hometown
Bolívar	Stefanía Ivanoba Camacho García	22	167	5'6"	Caluma
Cañar	Katherine Elizabeth Espín Gómez	20	171	5'7"	La Troncal
El Oro	Karen Madelaine Ramírez Murillo	18	170	5'7"	Machala
Esmeraldas	Ariana Estefanía Vilela Becerra	24	176	5'9"	Esmeraldas
Guayas	Gigliola Francesca Bustamante Romero	19	174	5'8"	Guayaquil
Guayas	Andreína Linabeth González Morán	19	174	5'8"	Guayaquil
Guayas	Andrea Abigaíl Vega Arnao	22	165	5'6"	Guayaquil
Guayas	Ginnette Esthefanía Wong Argenzio	23	171	5'7"	Guayaquil
Guayas	Carolina Margarita Wray Plaza	19	170	5'7"	Guayaquil
Imbabura	Ángela Maritza Bonilla Zapata	21	173	5'8"	Urcuquí
Los Ríos	Génesis Nirvana Torres Berruz	17	170	5'7"	Babahoyo
Manabí	María Emilia Díaz Monge	18	172	5'8"	Manta
Manabí	Mariel Paulette López Vinces	19	171	5'7"	Portoviejo
Pichincha	Évelyn Johanna Lama Iperti	24	170	5'7"	Quito
Santo Domingo	Laritza Libeth Párraga Arteaga	19	170	5'7"	Santo Domingo/El Carmen
Tungurahua	Daniela Alexandra Guerrero Tamayo	19	176	5'9"	Ambato

== Debuts ==
- Bolívar
- Cañar
- El Oro
- Esmeraldas
- Guayas
- Imbabura
- Los Ríos
- Manabí
- Pichincha
- Santo Domingo
- Tungurahua

=== Did not compete ===
- Pichincha - Andrea Estefanía Realpe Pérez

== Crossovers ==
- Karen Ramírez won the title of Reina de Machala 2012, Reina de El Oro 2012, Reina Nacional de la Minería 2012 and Reina del Pacífico 2012.
- Ariana Vilela competed in Reina de Esmeraldas 2012 but she was unplaced.
- Carolina Wray competed in Reina de Guayaquil 2012 and was 1st Runner-up .
- Nirvana Torres won the title of Reina de Babahoyo 2011, Reina de Los Ríos 2011, and Miss Queen World 2011.
- Laritza Párraga won the title of Reina de Santo Domingo 2012, Virreina Nacional del Pacífico 2012, and earlier in 2013 she withdrew from the pageant Miss Ecuador 2013.
- Angela Bonilla participated in Miss Earth 2015
- Angela Bonilla won Miss Global 2016
- Katherine Espin won Miss Earth 2016
