= Miss World Ecuador 2014 =

2nd edition of the Miss World Ecuador

- Date: October 4, 2014
- Presenters: Cinthya Coppiano; Ronald Farina
- Venue: Lineal Park, Guayaquil, Guayas, Ecuador
- Broadcaster: TC Televisión
- Entrants: 12
- Placements: 5
- Winner: Virginia Limongi; Manabí
- Congeniality: Emiliana Valdez; Guayas
- Best National Costume: Marjorie Zambrano; Esmeraldas
- Photogenic: Virginia Limongi; Manabí

Miss World Ecuador 2014 was the second Miss World Ecuador pageant, held at the Lineal Park in Guayaquil, Ecuador, on October 4, 2014.

Laritza Párraga of Santo Domingo crowned Virginia Limongi of Manabí at the end of the event.

== Results ==
=== Placements ===
Placement	Contestant
Miss World Ecuador 2014	Manabí – Virginia Limongi
1st Runner-Up	Guayas – Fátima Bayona
2nd Runner-Up	Cotopaxi – Ritha Limaico
3rd Runner-Up	Manabí – Belén Intriago
4th Runner-Up	Pichincha – Estefanía Realpe

=== Special awards ===
Award	Contestant
Miss Photogenic	Manabí – Virginia Limongi
Miss Congeniality	Guayas – Emiliana Valdez
Miss Talent	Cotopaxi – Ritha Limaico
Miss Esplandor	Manabí – Virginia Limongi
Miss Smile	Manabí – Virginia Limongi
Miss Sportive	Azuay – Elisa Artega
Best National Costume	Esmeraldas – Marjorie Zambrano

== Judges ==
- Patty Salame - Cosas Magazine Director
- Ramiro Finol - Businessman
- Juan Manuel Koing - Koing & Partners
- Arnaldo Lucas Correa - People en Español Etidor
- Roxana Queirolo - Fashion designer
- Maritza Massuh - Jewelry designer
- Carlos Coello - TC TV Manager
- Cecilia Niemes - Former model
- Raúl del Sol - Artist

== Contestants ==
Province	Contestant	Age	Height (ft)	Hometown
Azuay	Ana Elisa Arteaga Ávila	24	5'7"	Cuenca
Cotopaxi	Ritha Estefanía Limaico Berrezueta	24	5'7"	Latacunga
Esmeraldas	Diana Karolina Robles Lara	23	5'8"	Esmeraldas
Esmeraldas	Marjorie Elizabeth Zambrano Guerrero	22	5'7"	La Unión
Guayas	Fátima Gianina Bayona Grijalva	22	5'8"	Guayaquil
Guayas	Emiliana Alejandra Valdéz Torres	20	5'9"	Guayaquil
Guayas	Valeria Elizabeth Chavarría Zavala	20	5'9"	Guayaquil
Los Ríos	Karen Jessenia Varas Mora	20	5'8"	Babahoyo
Los Ríos	Nelly Nataly Campos Coello	21	5'9"	Babahoyo
Manabí	María Belén Intriago Velásquez	22	5'6"	Manta
Manabí	Virginia Stephannie Limongi Silva	20	5'10"	Portoviejo
Pichincha	Andrea Estefanía Realpe Pérez	24	5'7"	Quito

== Notes ==
=== Debuts ===
- Azuay
- Cotopaxi

=== Withdraws ===
- Bolívar
- Cañar
- El Oro
- Imbabura
- Santo Domingo
- Tungurahua

== Crossovers ==
- Ana Elisa Arteaga was the 1st Runner-up (Virreina) at Reina de Cuenca 2009 and Miss Pacífico Ecuador 2012.
- Gianina Bayona competed at Miss Atlántico Internacional 2014.
- Virginia Limongi was Reina de Portoviejo 2012 and Reina de Manabí 2012.
- Estefanía Realpe competed at Miss Ecuador 2012 but she was unplaced. She was selected as Miss Earth Ecuador 2013 but she was dethroned a few days before to compete at Miss Earth 2013.
- Karem Varas won Reina Mundial del Banano Capítulo Ecuador 2016
- Virginia Limongi competed in Top Model Of The World 2016, she made the Top 15.
- Karem Varas competed in Reina Mundial del Banano 2016, she was 3rd runner-up.
