= Tatiana Loor =

Ecuadorian beauty pageant titleholder (born 1991)

- Born: June 18, 1991 (age 35)
- Height: 1.73 m (5 ft 8 in)
- Beauty pageant titleholder
- Title: Miss International Ecuador; Miss Continente Americano Ecuador 2012
- Hair color: Black
- Eye color: Brown
- Major competitions: Miss Ecuador 2012 (2nd Runner-up) (Best in National Costume)

Tatiana Katherine Loor Hidalgo (born June 18, 1991) is an Ecuadorian model and beauty pageant titleholder who was crowned Miss International Ecuador 2012. She also represented her country in the 2012 Miss International pageant and Miss Continente Americano 2012.

== Early life ==
Loor was born in Santo Domingo de los Colorados. She speaks Spanish, Italian and English.

== Miss Ecuador 2012 ==
Tatiana, who stands 1.73 m (5 ft 8 in) tall, competed as a representative of Santo Domingo, one of 18 contestants in her country's national beauty pageant, Miss Ecuador 2012. The event was broadcast live on 16 March 2012 from La Libertad, where she obtained the title of Miss International Ecuador, gaining the right to represent her country in Miss International 2012.

== Miss Continente Americano 2012 ==
Loor competed as the Ecuadorian representative in Miss Continente Americano 2012 on September 29, 2012, in Guayaquil, Ecuador. She was appointed by Miss Ecuador Organization because the original winner, Carolina Aguirre, was not being able to compete due to a clash with the Miss Universe 2012 event.

Awards and achievements
Preceded by Fernanda Cornejo	Miss International Ecuador; 2012	Succeeded by Nathaly Arroba
Preceded by Claudia Schiess	Miss Continente Americano Ecuador; 2012	Succeeded by Carolina Aguirre
