= Ángela Bonilla =

Ecuadorian model and beauty pageant titleholder

- Born: Ángela Maritza Bonilla Zapata; December 27, 1991 (age 34); Urcuquí, Ecuador
- Height: 1.73 m (5 ft 8 in)
- Beauty pageant titleholder
- Title: Miss Global 2016; Miss Earth Ecuador 2015
- Hair color: Black
- Eye color: Brown
- Major competitions: Miss World Ecuador 2013 (Unplaced); Miss Ecuador 2015 (Unplaced); Miss Earth Ecuador 2015 (Winner); Miss Earth 2015 (Unplaced); Miss Global 2016 (Winner)

Ángela Maritza Bonilla Zapata (born December 27, 1991) is an Ecuadorian model and beauty pageant titleholder who won Miss Earth Ecuador 2015. She also won Miss Global 2016 representing Ecuador.

== Biography ==
=== Early life ===
She was born in Urcuquí, Imbabura Province. Ángela speaks Spanish, English and Italian. She is studying Journalism at Universidad Técnica Particular de Loja.

== Pageantry ==
Ángela is the second woman in competing at the three big national pageants in Ecuador: Miss Ecuador, Miss World Ecuador, and Miss Earth Ecuador. The first one was Estefanía Realpe from Pichincha.

=== Miss World Ecuador 2013 ===
Bonilla represented her province, Imbabura at Miss World Ecuador 2013. At the end of final night on July 4, 2013, in Guayaquil she was unplaced.

=== Miss Ecuador 2015 ===
Ángela competed at Miss Ecuador 2015, representing Imbabura. The final night was on March 14, 2015, in Guayaquil where she was one of the biggest favorites to win, but she was unplaced.

=== Miss Earth Ecuador 2015 ===
She was designated on September 2, 2015, by José Delgado, the director of Miss Earth Ecuador, as the national representative to compete in Miss Earth 2015.

=== Miss Earth 2015 ===
Bonilla competed at Miss Earth 2015 in Vienna, Austria where she was unplaced.

=== Miss Global 2016 ===
Bonilla also represented Ecuador at Miss Global 2016 in the Philippines where she won the crown.

Awards and achievements
Preceded by María José Maza	Miss Earth Ecuador; 2015	Succeeded by Katherine Espín
Preceded by (Australia) Jessica Peart	Miss Global; 2016	Succeeded by (Brazil) Bárbara Vitorelli
