= María José Maza =

Ecuadorian model and beauty pageant titleholder

- Born: María José Maza Solórzano; September 16, 1990 (age 36); Guayaquil, Ecuador
- Height: 1.76 m (5 ft 9 in)
- Beauty pageant titleholder
- Title: Miss Bikini Ecuador 2011; Miss Panamerican Ecuador 2013; Miss Caraibes Hibicus Ecuador 2013; Miss Earth Ecuador 2014
- Hair color: Brown
- Eye color: Brown
- Major competitions: Miss Ecuador 2011 (Unplaced); Miss Bikini International 2011 (Top 12); Miss Panamerican International 2013 (Winner); Miss Caraibes Hibiscus 2013 (2nd Runner-up); Miss Earth Ecuador 2014 (Appointed); Miss Earth 2014 (Unplaced)

María José Maza (born October 9, 1990, in Guayaquil) is an Ecuadorian model and beauty pageant titleholder.

== Biography ==
=== Early life ===
Born in Guayaquil, María José speaks Spanish and English, and graduated Engineering in Sales Administration at Universidad Católica de Santiago de Guayaquil.

== Pageantry ==
=== Miss Ecuador 2011 ===
Maza competed in Miss Ecuador 2011 where she was unplaced.

=== Miss Bikini International 2011 ===
As Miss Ecuador 2011's contestant she was designed by Miss Ecuador Organization the represent to the country at Miss Bikini International 2011 where she was on top 12 in Qingdao, China. 94 countries participated.

=== Miss Panamerican 2013 ===
She was the Ecuadorian represent to Miss Panamerican International 2013 in Los Angeles, California, United States, and she won the second crown to Ecuador.

=== Miss Caraibes Hibiscus 2013 ===
In 2013 she was designed to represent Ecuador in Miss Caraibes Habicus 2013 in Saint Maarten where she placed as 2nd Runner-up.

=== Miss Earth Ecuador 2014 ===
She was designated in August 2014 by José Hidalgo, the director of Miss Earth Ecuador, as the national representative to compete in Miss Earth 2014.

Awards and achievements
Preceded by Ana María Weir	Miss Earth Ecuador; 2014	Succeeded by Ángela Bonilla
