= Tatiana Torres =

Ecuadorian model and beauty pageant titleholder

- Born: Tatiana Catalina Torres Rojas; September 7, 1988 (age 38); Cuenca, Ecuador
- Height: 1.70 m (5 ft 7 in)
- Beauty pageant titleholder
- Title: Miss Earth Ecuador 2012; Miss Heritage Ecuador 2013
- Hair color: Black
- Eye color: Brown
- Major competitions: Miss Earth Ecuador 2012 (Winner); Miss Earth 2012 (Unplaced); Miss Heritage Ecuador 2013 (Winner); Miss Heritage 2013 (4th Runner-up)

Tatiana Torres (born September 7, 1988, in Cuenca, Ecuador) is an Ecuadorian model and beauty pageant titleholder who assumed the crown of Miss Earth Ecuador 2012 before Estefanía Realpe was dethroned; she competed at Miss Earth 2012 but she was unplaced. She also competed at Miss Heritage 2013, and placed as 4th runner up.

== Early life ==
She was born in Cuenca, and is a speaker of Spanish and English.

== Miss Earth Ecuador 2012 ==
Torres was designed as Miss Earth Ecuador 2013 by the national director, José Hidalgo to compete in Miss Earth 2012, after the original selected was dethroned.

== Miss Earth 2012 ==
Torres competed at Miss Earth 2012 but she was unplaced.

== Miss Heritage 2013 ==
Torres also competed at Miss Heritage World 2013 The pageant re-branded and now is known as Miss Heritage and she placed 5th place.

Awards and achievements
Preceded by Estefanía Realpe	Miss Earth Ecuador; 2012 assumed	Succeeded by Ana María Weir
Preceded by First Edition	Miss Heritage Ecuador; 2013	Succeeded by María José Otavalo
