= Miss Ecuador 2011 =

Beauty pageant edition

- Date: March 17, 2011
- Presenters: Roberto Rodríguez; Jennifer Pazmiño
- Venue: Recinto Ferial Alfonso Torres Ordoñez, Santo Domingo de los Colorados, Santo Domingo de los Tsáchilas, Ecuador
- Broadcaster: Gama TV
- Entrants: 22
- Placements: 5
- Withdrawals: Bolívar; Cañar; Chimborazo; Tungurahua
- Returns: Carchi; El Oro; Esmeraldas; Galápagos; Los Ríos; Santo Domingo de los Tsáchilas
- Winner: Claudia Schiess; Galápagos

Miss Ecuador 2011 was the 61st edition of the Miss Ecuador pageant, held at the Recinto Ferial Alfonso Torres Ordoñez in Santo Domingo, Ecuador, on March 17, 2011.

Lady Mina of Guayas crowned Claudia Schiess of Galápagos as her successor at the end of the event. Schiess represented Ecuador at Miss Universe 2011, held in Brazil.

== Results ==
=== Placements ===
Placement	Contestant
Miss Ecuador 2011	Galápagos – Claudia Schiess
Miss World Ecuador 2011	Guayas – Verónica Vargas
Miss International Ecuador 2011	Pichincha – María Fernanada Cornejo
Miss Earth Ecuador 2011	Guayas – Olga Álava
2nd Runner-Up	Guayas – Leslie Ayala

=== Special awards ===
Award	Contestant
Miss Congeniality	Manabí – Romina Vera
Miss Photogenic	Guayas – María Verónica Vargas
Miss Yambal	Galápagos – Claudia Schiess
Miss Sedal	Galápagos – Claudia Schiess
Miss Cielo	Galápagos – Claudia Schiess
Best National Costume	Pichincha – Fernanda Cornejo

== Judges ==
- Rafael Araneda - Chilean TV presenter
- Marjorie Adum - Jeweler
- Gionni Straccia - Venezuelan fashion designer
- Carlos Ochoa - Ecuadorean TV presenter
- Stefanía Fernández - Miss Universe 2009
- Alonso Espinoza - TAME
- Edwin Rosario - Puerto Rican fashion designer
- María Mosquera de Saman - Make-up artist
- Luis De Los Reyes - Renault

== Contestants ==
Twenty-two contestants competed for the title.

Province	Contestant	Age	Height (cm)	Height (ft)	Hometown
Carchi	Mireya Isabel Levy Ortíz	21	172	5 ft 8 in	Tulcán
El Oro	Andrea Lissette Mestanza Ramarez	19	171	5 ft 7 in	Machala
Esmeraldas	Jéssica Katherine Mercado Chasing	23	173	5 ft 8 in	Esmeraldas
Esmeraldas	Jéssica Viviana Cortéz Zuñiga	22	183	6 ft 0 in	Esmeraldas
Galápagos	Claudia Elena Schiess Fretz	21	172	5 ft 8 in	Santa Cruz
Guayas	Nelly Cedeño Ortíz	23	178	5 ft 10 in	Guayaquil
Guayas	Olga Mercedes Álava Vargas	23	173	5 ft 8 in	Guayaquil
Guayas	Leslie Annette Ayala Rodríguez	23	176	5 ft 9 in	Guayaquil
Guayas	María José Maza Solórzano	20	176	5 ft 9 in	Guayaquil
Guayas	Ana Carolina Ortega Salazar	21	180	5 ft 11 in	Guayaquil
Guayas	María Verónica Vargas Granja	21	175	5 ft 9 in	Guayaquil
Loja	Jhoanna Lizbeth Ruiz Moncada	19	180	5 ft 11 in	Zapotillo
Los Ríos	Rina María Cantó Aguilar	18	178	5 ft 10 in	Urdaneta
Manabí	Rocío Claribel González Loor	24	173	5 ft 8 in	Manta
Manabí	Romina Patricia Vera Cedeño	24	175	5 ft 9 in	Calceta
Manabí	Evelyn Natasha Rivera Chávez	24	172	5 ft 8 in	Veinticuatro de Mayo
Pichincha	Emily Sorely Briones Alvarez	18	178	5 ft 10 in	Quito
Pichincha	María Fernanda Cornejo Alfaro	21	178	5 ft 10 in	Quito
Pichincha	Andrea Carolina Hurtado Murillo	24	173	5 ft 8 in	Quito
Pichincha	Diana Estefanía Urresta Valencia	18	175	5 ft 9 in	Quito
Santo Domingo	Ruth Estefanía Guevara Yanez	18	172	5 ft 8 in	Santo Domingo
Santo Domingo	María Dolores Saavedra Santander	20	172	5 ft 8 in	Santo Domingo

== Notes ==
=== Returns ===
Last Competed in:

- 2005:
  - Carchi
  - Galápagos
- 2009:
  - El Oro
  - Esmeraldas
  - Los Ríos
  - Santo Domingo

=== Withdraws ===
- Bolívar
- Cañar
- Chimborazo
- Tungurahua

=== Reality ===
- January 17, 2011 was the first elimination where Nelly Carreño from Guayas was eliminated because the judges said that she was really skinny. The judges were: Dr. Nelson Estrella, Dr. Mariana Mosquera, and Mr. Marco Tapia.
- January 24, 2011 was the second elimination but no one was eliminated because four contestants have had an accident.
- January 31, 2011 was the third elimination where Emily Briones from Pichincha was eliminated due she hasn't finished high school. The judges were: Andriana Loor, María Fernanda Coello, and Heytel Moreno.
- February 7, 2011 was the fourth elimination where Jéssica Cortez from Esmeraldas was eliminated due not complete to the official events. The judges were: Laura Perrone, Martha Tetamanti, and Alberto Cajamarca.

=== Crossovers ===
- Claribel González competed in Reina de Manta 2002 where she was 2nd Runner-up, and she won Models New Generation in 2007
- María Fernanda Cornejo is an Ecuadorian Top Model who competed in Models New Generation in 2004, and Elite Models in Curaçao and won the Miss Tersovit 2010 crown Miss International 2011.
- Jéssica Mercado was Reina del Esmeraldeñismo in 2005.
- Andrea Hurtado competed in Reina de Quito 2005, but she was unplaced.
- Rina María Cantó was Reina de Urdaneta 2007 and Reina de Los Ríos 2007.
- Olga Álava was Virreina de Guayaquil 2008.and competed in Miss Earth 2011 and she won.
- Leslie Ayala competed in Reina de Guayaquil 2008 but she was unplaced, and she was 1st Runner-up in Miss Piel Dorada 2009.
- María Dolores Saavedra is Reina de Santo Domingo 2010.
- Mireya Levy is Reina de Tulcan 2010, Reina de Carchi 2010, and Reina de Mi Tierra 2010.
- Claudia Schiess competed in Miss Supranational 2010, but unplaced. She was born in Galápagos Islands, but her father is Ecuadorian and her mother is of Swiss and German ancestry.
- Natasha Rivera is Reina de Veinticuatro de Mayo 2010 and Virreina de Manabi 2010.
- Jhoanna Ruiz is Reina de Zapotillo 2010.
- Verónica Vargas won Nereida de la Armada Nacional 2009.
- María José Maza won CN Modelos Search 2010.
- Ana Carolina Ortega competed in Reina de Guayaquil 2010, but she was unplaced.
