= Miss Ecuador 2023 =

Beauty contest

- Date: July 1, 2023
- Presenters: Roberto Rodríguez; Claudia Schiess
- Venue: Recinto Ferial "Alfonso Torres Ordoñez", Santo Domingo, Ecuador
- Broadcaster: Gamavisión
- Entrants: 23
- Placements: 10
- Debuts: Italy Community
- Withdrawals: Esmeraldas; Los Ríos; Sucumbíos
- Returns: Bolívar; Cañar; Cotopaxi; Galápagos; Imbabura; Manabí Province; Pastaza; USA Community
- Winner: Delary Stoffers; Guayas
- Congeniality: Nahomi Guzmán (Manabí)
- Best National Costume: Delary Stoffers (Guayas)

Miss Ecuador 2023 was the 73rd edition of the Miss Ecuador pageant, held at the Recinto Ferial "Alfonso Torres Ordoñez" in Santo Domingo, Ecuador, on July 1, 2023.

At the end of the event, Delary Stoffers of Guayas was crowned Miss Ecuador 2023. Stoffers represented Ecuador at Miss Universe 2023 held in El Salvador. The first runner-up, Paulethe Cajas, will compete at Miss International 2024 to be held in Japan.

== Results ==
=== Placements ===
| Placement | Contestant |
|---|---|
| Miss Ecuador 2023 | Guayas – Delary Stoffers |
| 1st Runner-Up (Miss International Ecuador 2024) | Pichincha – Paulethe Cajas |
| 2nd Runner-Up | Azuay – María José Barzallo |
| 3rd Runner-Up | El Oro – Nicole Pinilla |
| 4th Runner-Up | Manabí – Nahomi Guzmán |
| 5th Runner-Up | Guayas – Sulay Mora |
| Top 10 | Italy – Sullay Gatti; Pichincha – Daniela Romero; Santo Domingo – Emily Quelal; United States – Naomi Viteri |

=== Special awards ===
| Award | Contestant |
|---|---|
| Best National Costume | Guayas – Delary Stoffers |
| Miss Congeniality | Manabí – Nahomi Guzmán |
| Miss Cielo | Guayas – Delary Stoffers |
| Miss Fashion Beauty | El Oro – Nicole Pinilla |
| Miss Punctuality | Manabí – Nahomi Guzmán |
| Miss Hair Truss | Pichincha – Daniela Romero |
| Miss Elegance | Pichincha – Paulethe Cajas |

=== Best National Costume ===
| Award | Contestant |
|---|---|
| Best National Costume | Guayas – Delary Stoffers (Manolo Loor) |
| 1st Runner-Up | Manabí – Nahomi Guzmán (Wenceslao Muñoz) |
| 2nd Runner-Up | Azuay – María José Barzallo (Jefferson Vera) |

== Contestants ==
There are 23 official delegates to compete at Miss Ecuador 2023:

| Province | Contestant | Age (Note: Ages at the time of the pageant) | Height | Hometown |
|---|---|---|---|---|
| Azuay | María José Barzallo Cordero | 21 | 1.74 m (5 ft 8 1/2 in) | Cuenca |
| Bolívar | Dayana Mishell Robalino Camacho | 27 | 1.70 m (5 ft 7 in) | Caluma |
| Cañar | Nicole Valentina Rivas Rodas | 21 | 1.70 m (5 ft 7 in) | Azogues |
| Chimborazo | Arantxa Ligia Sánchez Rodríguez | 24 | 1.71 m (5 ft 7 1/2 in) | Cumandá |
| Chimborazo | Maura Lilian Vallejo Piedra | 27 | 1.65 m (5 ft 5 in) | Riobamba |
| Cotopaxi | Katherine Abigaíl Velasco Bastidas | 25 | 1.74 m (5 ft 8 1/2 in) | Latacunga |
| El Oro | Nicole Madelayne Pinilla Marín | 22 | 1.68 m (5 ft 6 in) | Machala |
| Galápagos | Emily Alexandra Mora Ricaurte | 21 | 1.69 m (5 ft 6 1/2 in) | Puerto Baquerizo Moreno |
| Guayas | Sulay Stephany Mora García | 18 | 1.74 m (5 ft 8 1/2 in) | Guayaquil |
| Guayas | Delary Georgette Stoffers Villón | 23 | 1.81 m (5 ft 11 1/2 in) | Guayaquil |
| Imbabura | Nicole Alejandra López Ponce | 25 | 1.69 m (5 ft 6 1/2 in) | Antonio Ante |
| Italy Community | Sullay Daniela Gatti Figueroa | 24 | 1.72 m (5 ft 7 1/2 in) | Milan / Cuenca |
| Loja | Carolina Stefanía Patiño Ochoa | 27 | 1.76 m (5 ft 9 1/2 in) | Catamayo |
| Manabí | Nahomi Soledad Guzmán Cedeño | 22 | 1.83 m (6 ft 0 in) | Manta |
| Manabí | Valerie Isabella Giler Párraga | 18 | 1.73 m (5 ft 8 in) | Manta |
| Pastaza | María Belén Jaramillo López | 27 | 1.70 m (5 ft 7 in) | Puyo |
| Pichincha | Martha Cecilia Álvarez Burgos | 26 | 1.72 m (5 ft 7 1/2 in) | Quito |
| Pichincha | Paulethe Dominique Cajas Vela | 21 | 1.75 m (5 ft 9 in) | Quito |
| Pichincha | Stephania Nicole Jaramillo Martínez | 27 | 1.70 m (5 ft 7 in) | Quito |
| Pichincha | Daniela Alejandra Romero Dávila | 26 | 1.68 m (5 ft 6 in) | Quito |
| Santo Domingo | Erika Arlette Cuvi Armijos | 25 | 1.70 m (5 ft 7 in) | Santo Domingo |
| Santo Domingo | Emily Alejandra Quelal Zambrano | 20 | 1.71 m (5 ft 7 1/2 in) | Santo Domingo |
| USA Community | Naomi Yunim Viteri Flores | 21 | 1.73 m (5 ft 8 in) | Miami / Santo Domingo |
