= Olga Álava =

Ecuadorian beauty queen and businesswoman (born 1988)

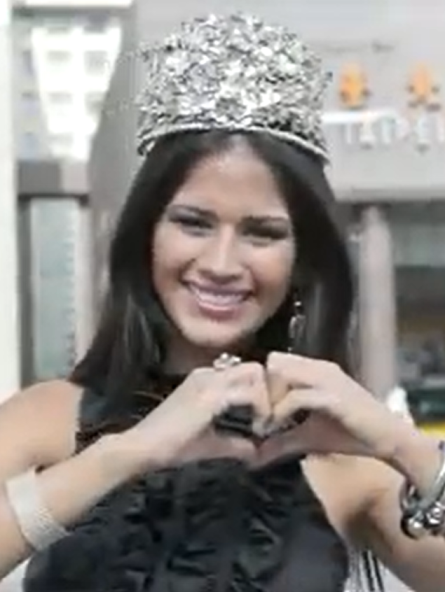
- Álava in 2012
- Born: Olga Mercedes Álava Vargas; 14 February 1988 (age 38)
- Height: 1.75 m (5 ft 9 in)
- Beauty pageant titleholder
- Title: Miss Earth Ecuador 2011; Miss Earth 2011
- Hair color: Brunette
- Eye color: Hazel
- Major competitions: Miss Ecuador 2011; (3rd Runner-Up); Reina Hispanoamericana 2011; (2nd Runner-Up); Miss Earth 2011; (Winner)

Olga Mercedes Álava Vargas (born 14 February 1988) is an Ecuadorian model, social, lifestyle entrepreneur, environmentalist and beauty queen. She became the first delegate from Ecuador to win the Miss Earth pageant.

== Biography ==
Álava, born on 14 February 1988, in Guayaquil, Ecuador, is the daughter of Ramón Álava and Teresa Vargas. She has three brothers and is the oldest of four children. Her hobbies include photography and modeling. During her childhood years she frequently visited the province of Manabi and spent much of her time on its beaches.

She has a Bachelor's degree in International Business and graduated from the Universidad de Especialidades Espíritu Santo. She speaks Spanish, English, and Mandarin Chinese; and studied the French language at the Alliance Française. Her interest in cultural exchange has led her to live in other countries. She lived in China for one year, where she studied the Chinese language in Shanghai for seven months and helped her father in the import and quality control of their business. She also spent seven months in Colorado, United States where she had a public relations internship in a restaurant.

== Pageantry ==
Álava's foray into beauty pageants is no accident. In October 2008, she competed and won in the Reina de Guayaquil pageant and performed various social works. She participated in Charity Catwalk along with other beauty queens that raised $4,000 for families with AIDS to benefit the Fundación Nuestra Belleza. In addition, modeling has also been part of her life since joining the Agencia Chantal Fontaine. She competed in Ecuador's Super Model of the World competition in 2006 and won second place.

=== Miss Ecuador 2011 ===
In March 2011, she competed as the representative of Guayas in Miss Ecuador 2011, and became the eventual third runner up. As part of her duty, she worked with the Fundación Bellezas por la Vida (Foundation Beauties for Life), which assists mothers infected with HIV, and worked with projects for the community.

=== Miss Earth Ecuador 2011 ===
Álava was chosen and crowned Miss Earth Ecuador 2011 on 28 July 2011 at the Unipark organized by José Hidalgo of Diosas Escuela de Mises, the franchise holder of Miss Earth Ecuador. She wore a crown created by Catalina Salcedo made in silver with rhinestones and has a flower design and pearl nacre valued at approximately $10,000. To dispel the rumors of disagreement of the other organization, Miss Ecuador Organization, for her participation in the Miss Earth 2011, Alava clarified that the directors of the contest and Gama TV, official channel of the national gala, support her representation in the Miss Earth 2011 pageant.

=== Reina Hispanoamericana 2011 ===
As part of her preparation in the Miss Earth 2011 pageant, Álava travelled to Bolivia in October 2011 to represent Ecuador in the twenty-first edition of the Reina Hispanoamericana. She eventually placed fourth (second runner-up) at the conclusion of the Reina Hispanoamericana 2011 pageant.

=== Miss Earth 2011 ===
Álava won and was crowned Miss Earth 2011 by Miss Earth 2010 Nicole Faria on 3 December 2011 at the University of the Philippines Theatre in Diliman, Quezon City, Philippines.

She presented at the pageant an environmental project to protect mangroves in Ecuador and has also become a spokesperson for the protection of the natural reserve of Yasuní. During the gala, she told the jury that "education is the best solution for the environment because children are the ones that preserve the earth for future generations", in response to the final question. She will reign over the next twelve months, after winning the pageant that participated by 84 countries in which the delegates of Latin America accounted for three of the top four.

Álava's achievement was an improvement from Ecuador's placement in 2010 where Jennifer Pazmiño placed second in Miss Earth 2010 which was held in Vietnam. She becomes a spokesperson for the Miss Earth Foundation and the United Nations Environment Programme (UNEP).

== Media and environmental activism ==
After winning Miss Earth 2011 in the Philippines, Álava toured several Asian cities before arriving in Ecuador. She traveled to Beijing in the last week of December 2011 and met with the Ecuadorian ambassador in China, upon the embassy's invitation. She proceeded to Shanghai where she previously studied Mandarin for seven months in 2009 and worked for four months in 2010.

On 28 December 2011, Álava returned to Ecuador and was met at the airport by her relatives and friends, including Miss Earth Ecuador national director José Hidalgo. A press conference for her victory in Miss Earth was held at the City Hall of the Municipality of Guayaquil. She was honored by the mayor for her performance in the Miss Earth pageant and for highlighting the name of Guayaquil worldwide. After the tribute, she stopped the traffic along the Malecon Simon Bolivar then aboard a Chevrolet Impala sixties, she was paraded at the main downtown streets.

She signed an agreement to be the face and spokesperson for the campaign Manos Juntas por el Estero Salado (Hands Together for the Estero Salado) that aims to educate the public about the importance of reducing pollution in Guayaquil estuary. The project, undertaken by the Centro Internacional de Investigaciones del Fenómeno del Niño (International Research Center of El Niño) and the United States Agency for International Development is part of her environmental campaign as Miss Earth. She also joined the collection of funds for the Yasuní rainforest and wildlife and launched a campaign for the preservation of the Galápagos Islands. In January 2012, Álava met with the Ministry of Environment in Ecuador and discussed issues related to environmental preservation. She then actively participated in the tree planting of 7,500 young Pijio trees in the coastal region of Ecuador that is in danger due to the forestal fires together with the Ecuadorian Army and Arnoldo Alencastro, the person who began the campaign to save the Pijio Tree.

Álava was a special guest in the Dulce Mar Fashion Show held at the C.C. City Mall in Guayaquil on 2 February 2012 which featured accessories, swimwear, and apparel from Aéropostale, Megamaxi, Traviesa, and Fuera de Serie. In the selection of the Queen of Santa Cruz Island in Galapagos, she served as a juror then traveled to Quito for a photo shoot.

She starred in the Cosas Magazine (Ecuador) in March 2012 in which she portrayed the concept, "Los 17 de las Artes" as a tribute to the arts inspired by the relationship between the number 17 specifically the 17 plays of William Shakespeare written in the 17th century, the 17 Beethoven Quartets, and the 17 types of tiles that cover the Alhambra palace. She donned the collections of fashion designer Adolfo Domínguez. She was a special guest in the Miss Ecuador 2012 pageant held at Puerto Lucía Yacht Club, La Libertad, Santa Elena, Ecuador on 16 March 2012.

From 17 to 22 March 2012, Álava traveled to the United States as special guest for the office of the Consulate of Ecuador. She then sashayed on the runway in the Miami International Fashion Week on 21 March 2012 at the Miami Beach Convention Center. She wore a swimwear designed by Carmen Larrea for the well-known Ecuadorian brand, Pais del Sol. She opened the swimwear parade with the collection of Ecuadorian brand "Country of the Sun", which is called "Sacred Ground Yasuní" and whose proceeds went to benefit the Yasuní-ITT Initiative. She also attended a press conference with Ivonne Baki, a candidate for Director General of UNESCO. She then returned to Ecuador on 23 March 2012 to participate in a fundraising event for the victims of flood. She traveled from 26 March to 3 April 2012 to Réunion Island in Africa and attended different environmental activities and as head of the panel of judges in the Miss Earth Réunion Island pageant, which won by Aisha Valy.

She had a special appearance in musical charity concert called, Voces Solidarias (Voices of Solidarity) on 13 April 2012 held in the city of Guayaquil that was organized by the People's Volunteer Network of Teachers to raise funds for the people affected by the flood in different areas of Ecuador. During the 2012 Earth Day celebration, Álava shared ecotips on how to recycle used paper sheets, use of energy-saving bulbs, natural light, and rechargeable batteries. She then graced the event "Jornada Ecológica por Nuestra Tierra" to commemorate Earth Day in Ecuador on 22 April 2012 which also attended by Ecuador's Environment Minister, Marcela Aguinaga. She also participated in the Minga of Solid Waste Collection on the banks of the Estero Salado.

Álava walked the ramp on 11 May as guest of honor at the Lisa Quirola Fashion Show then paid a social visit to celebrate Mother's Day at a local hospital in Ecuador. She traveled on 16 May 2012 to New York City as special guest for the cultural festival, Ecuafest.

At a local school in the Ecuador, she visited and shared environmental tips to children as part of her "I Love My Planet School Tour" on 1 June 2012.

From June to July 2012, Álava had a tour with the Miss Earth Foundation. She visited Taiwan where she received homage, attended the opening of an electric car assembly plant, and joined the International Committee of the Red Cross in its social action campaigns and various projects in Taiwan. She proceeded to Guam to grace the Miss Earth Guam pageant which was held on 18 June 2012 at the Sheraton Laguna Guam Resort in Tamuning. She crowned not one, but two winners: Miss Earth Guam 2012 and Miss Earth Guam 2013 so the latter would have more time to train for the international Miss Earth pageant. She then went to Puerto Princesa, Philippines to visit the Puerto Princesa Subterranean River National Park, one of the New 7 Wonders of Nature, where she participated in several activities in favor of the ecosystem. She then graced the Cagueban Festival on 30 June 2012 which was reminiscent of the Earth Hour and led the tree planting event at the Irawan's mountains and watershed that participated by about 60,000 people from Puerto Princesa and nearby municipalities where more than 100,000 tree saplings were added to the more 2 million mature and fast-growing trees that have been planted since the festival began in 1991. Aside from the tree-planting activities, there were also visits to eco-camping sites, games and contests, and performances by environmental artists. She also visited Qatar and Thailand, where she held a variety of social and environmental issues as part of the Miss Earth Foundation. She also traveled to New York, Miami, and Paris, cities that has led and promoted environmental campaigns and charities. She returned to Ecuador on 20 July 2012.

In addition to numerous trips around Ecuador, so far during her reign, Álava had traveled to the Philippines, China, France, United States, Taiwan, Guam, Qatar, Thailand, Réunion Island in Africa, India and Sri Lanka.

== After Miss Earth reign ==
She traveled in Sri Lanka in 2013, where she visited the Pinnawala Elephant Orphanage, an orphanage, nursery and captive breeding ground for wild Asian elephants then she proceeded in the city of Kandy, the last capital of the ancient kings' era of Sri Lanka where she was hosted at the Chaaya Citadel Kandy. She was a guest at the 134th Battle of the Blues and then she served as one of the judges in Miss Earth Sri Lanka 2013.

She became a Goodwill Ambassador for Red Ribbon Revolution in March 2013, an initiative to eradicate stigma and discrimination among children and youth living with HIV/AIDS through sports as a medium of transformation and she visited Bangalore, India on the 2nd week of March 2013 for a charity event for children and mothers with HIV.

Álava was chosen in October 2013 as the newest talent by one of Ecuador's major TV network, Ecuavisa and became a host on the showbiz program "Gente" as a replacement of Maria Teresa Guerrero in the show.

On 12 January 2015, she made a debut as host of #Hashtag, the new program of La República where she initially had an interview with Samantha Gray, the daughter of the singer Sharon la Hechicera, who was killed in an accident.

In March 2020, Alava contracted and tested positive for the Coronavirus disease 2019 (COVID-19) which she got from a supermarket while preparing for the emergency lockdown in Ecuador. She narrated that she initially presented with a fever, cough and then shortness of breath, but eventually recovered and survived the disease.

Awards and achievements
| Preceded by Gabriela Estupiñan | Virreina de Guayaquil; 2008 | Succeeded by Pilar Salazar |
| Preceded by (India) Nicole Faria | Miss Earth; 2011 | Succeeded by (Czech Republic) Tereza Fajksová |
| Preceded by Jennifer Pazmiño | Miss Earth Ecuador; 2011 | Succeeded by Estefanía Realpe |
| Preceded by Lady Mina | Reina Hispanoamericana Ecuador; 2011 | Succeeded by Nicole Cevallos |
