= Katherine Espín =

Ecuadorian beauty pageant titleholder

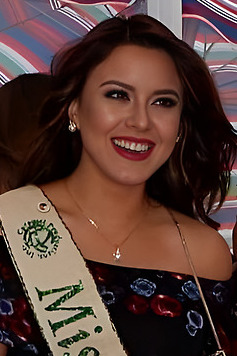
- Born: Katherine Elizabeth Espín Gómez; November 15, 1992 (age 33); La Troncal, Ecuador
- Education: Universidad Católica de Cuenca
- Beauty pageant titleholder
- Title: Miss Bikini Ecuador 2015; Miss Earth Ecuador 2016; Miss Earth 2016
- Major competitions: Miss World Ecuador 2013; (Unplaced); Miss Earth Ecuador 2016; (Winner); Miss Earth 2016; (Winner); Miss Universe Ecuador 2024; (2nd Runner-Up)

Katherine Elizabeth Espín Gómez (born November 15, 1992) is an Ecuadorian beauty pageant titleholder who won Miss Earth Ecuador 2016, and Miss Earth 2016. She competed in Miss Universe Ecuador 2024 and was second runner-up.

== Biography ==
=== Early life ===
Espín was born November 15, 1992 in La Troncal in the Cañar Province of Ecuador, to Freddy Espín and Orsa Gómez.

== Pageantry ==
Prior to competing in the Miss Earth pageant, Espín represented Ecuador but did not win at the Reinado Internacional del Café 2013, but she was first runner up in the Miss Bikini Universe 2015.

=== Miss Earth 2016 ===
Espín won Miss Earth 2016 representing Ecuador, competing against 82 other entrants. During the pre-pageant events, she won a gold medal in the "Darling of the Press" award, gold medals for the resort's wear and long gown competitions; silver medals for the swimsuit competition, and a bronze medal for the national costume competition. She is also the National Director of Miss Earth Ecuador pageant at present.

In an interview, she stated that she had been wanting to be Miss Earth since she was 16 years old and said to reporters, "There was an Ecuadorian named Olga Alava, [who] won the pageant, and I remembered that when I saw her, I saw myself winning and I'm making my dream come true."

== Miss Earth reign ==
Espín returned to Ecuador after winning Miss Earth after nearly two months of traveling in the Philippines promoting environmental awareness, media appearances including guesting in New York City. She arrived on December 7, 2016, at the José Joaquín de Olmedo International Airport in Guayaquil and a press conference was held for her victory in Miss Earth including a motorcade from the airport to her hometown La Troncal and received with placards with her name, cheers and shouts from the balconies and in the streets on her triumph.

Espín and Miss Earth Air 2016 Michelle Gomez travelled to Reunion Island for the coronation of Miss Earth Reunion 2017, and conducted an environmental campaign at the Charles Cros - Mont Ver Les Hauts School and led tree planting activity with the students, and visited ecotourism spots and toured the island's electric car company, Renault.

In April 2017, Espín flew to Angola for Earth Day 2017, and the crowning of Miss Earth Angola 2017. She also attended a tree planting activity together with Fundacao Verde with the support of the Government of Angola and the Ministerio do Ambiente. On the same month, Espin attended the launch of Miss Earth Ghana Organization's "Trash in Bin Campaign" in Ghana with Miss Earth Ghana 2016 Deborah Eyram Dodor and promoted proper waste disposal and segregation.

Espín attended the State of the Nation Address (SONA) of the Philippine President Rodrigo Duterte at the Batasang Pambansa Complex on July 24, 2017, and she was joined by Isabela vice governor Tonypet Albano.

In July 2017, Espín travelled in Singapore as an honorary member along with thirty-three delegates from the League of Vice Governors of the Philippines to attend the foreign study "Driving Excellence in Governance" at the National University of Singapore's Lee Kuan Yew School of Public Policy (NUS-LKYSPP), which is the academic phase project funded under the General Appropriations Act, was overseen by the Development Academy of the Philippines.

She travelled to Puerto Rico in August 2017 to attend the Miss Earth Puerto Rico 2017 where she crowned Karla Victoria Aponte .

In September 2017, she went to Chile and attended Nuestra Belleza Chile 2017 (Miss Earth Chile 2017) and served as the chairwoman of the board of judges of the pageant which was won by Sofía Manzur.

She became an Ecotourism Ambassador in the Philippines, an honorary member in the League of Vice Governors in Asia, worked with the Liter of Light Foundation globally, and received the national award of "Honorable Citizen" in Ecuador for her accomplishments as an advocate of environmental preservation.

During her reign, she has traveled to Angola, Ghana, Reunion Island, Singapore, United States, Middle East, Puerto Rico, Chile and numerous trips around the Philippines.

Awards and achievements
Preceded by (Philippines) Angelia Ong	Miss Earth; 2016	Succeeded by (Philippines) Karen Ibasco
Preceded by Ángela Bonilla	Miss Earth Ecuador; 2016	Succeeded by Lessie Giler
