= Cipriana Correia =

Ecuadorian beauty pageant titleholder (born 1990)

- Born: Denisse Cipriana Correia Macías; August 12, 1990 (age 36); Esmeraldas Province, Ecuador
- Height: 1.75 m (5 ft 9 in)
- Beauty pageant titleholder
- Title: Miss World Ecuador
- Hair color: Black
- Eye color: Brown
- Major competitions: Miss Ecuador 2012 (1st Runner-up); Miss World 2012

Cipriana Correia (born August 12, 1990) is an Ecuadorian journalism and beauty pageant titleholder who was crowned Miss World Ecuador 2012 and represented her Ecuador in the 2012 Miss World pageant.

== Early life ==
Born in Esmeraldas. Correia speaks Spanish and English, she loves playing soccer and studied journalism at ITV.

== Miss Ecuador 2012 ==
Cipriana, who stands 1.75 m (5 ft 9 in) tall, competed as a representative of Esmeraldas, one of 18 contestants in her country's national beauty pageant, Miss Ecuador 2012, broadcast live on March 16, 2012, from La Libertad, where she obtained the title of Miss World Ecuador, gaining the right to represent her country in Miss World 2012.

Awards and achievements
Preceded by Verónica Vargas	Miss World Ecuador; 2012	Succeeded by Laritza Párraga
