= Ana Galarza =

Model and politician from Ecuador

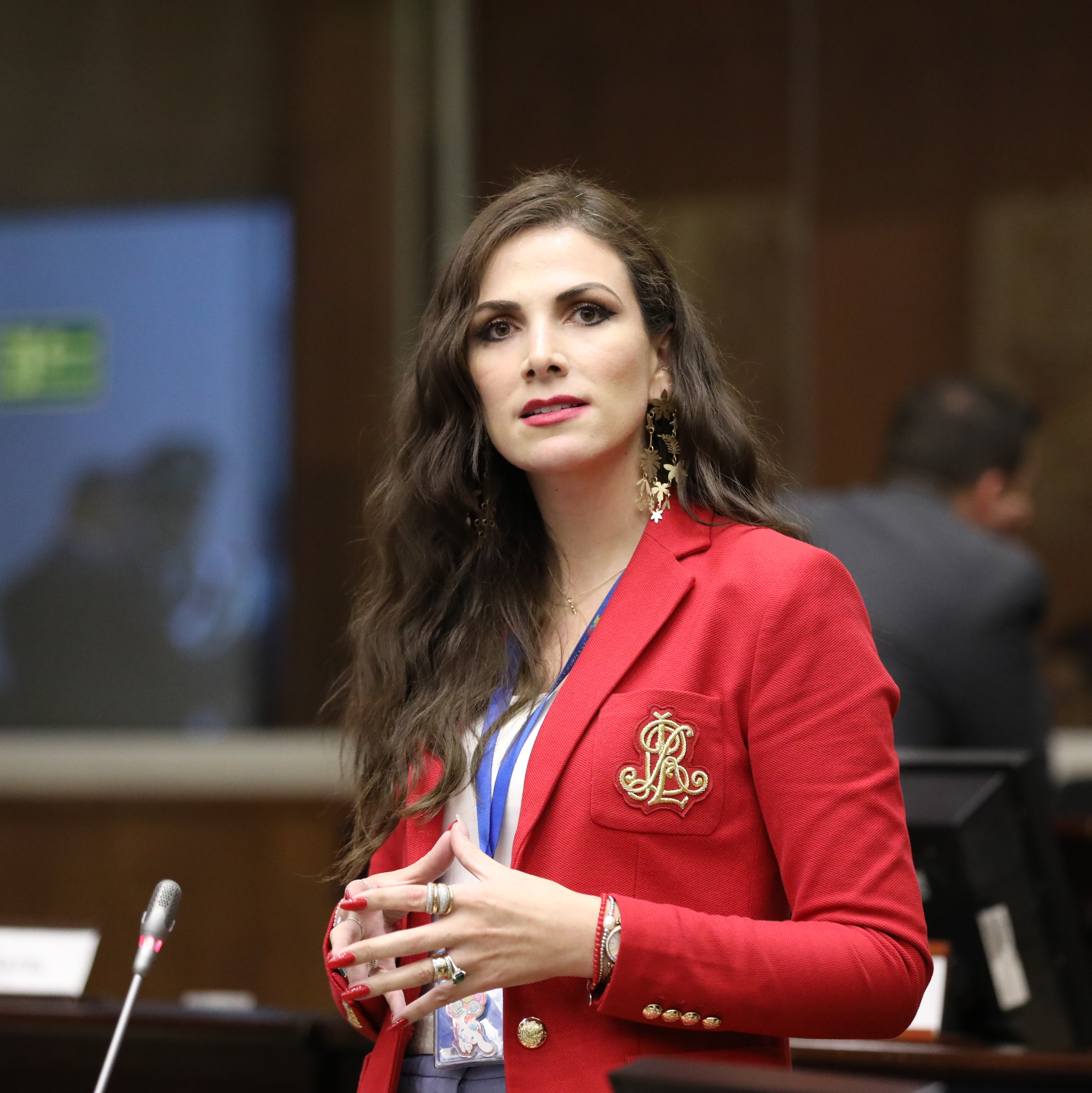
- in 2025 at the National Assembly
- Born: Ana Mercedes Galarza Añazco; August 24, 1988 (age 38); Ambato, Ecuador
- Height: 1.65 m (5 ft 5 in)
- Beauty pageant titleholder
- Title: Miss World Ecuador 2010
- Hair color: Blond
- Eye color: Black
- Major competitions: Reina de Ambato 2007 (winner); Miss Ecuador 2010 (1st runner-up); Miss World 2010 (unplaced)

Ana Mercedes Galarza Añazco (born August 24, 1988 in Ambato, Tungurahua, Ecuador is an Ecuadorian politician and beauty pageant titleholder who placed first runner-up at Miss Ecuador 2010. She was elected to the National Assembly in 2017.

== Beauty pageant ==
=== Miss Ecuador 2010 ===
Galarza was a student of Psychology in the Pontificia Universidad Cátolica del Ecuador. She is also the first woman from Tungurahua to be crowned Miss World Ecuador. Miss Ecuador 2010 was broadcast live from CEMEXPO, in Quito.

=== Miss World 2010 ===
As the first runner-up of the Miss Ecuador 2010 beauty pageant, Galarza represented Ecuador in the Miss World 2010 pageant. She placed among the Top 20 in the Miss World Talent fast-track competition.

== Political career ==
Galarza was a candidate for the CREO movement for Tungurahua at the 2017 General election and was elected to the National Assembly. In February 2019, she was removed from office following a vote of the assembly due to accusations of illicit enrichment and forgery. In December 2021 the case is closed.

In August 2023, she was candidate for Movimiento Construye and re-elected at the National Assembly. She, Rosa Mayorga, Ramiro Vela and Rosa Baltazar (in absentia) were acknowledged as successful in a ceremony on 15 October 2023 in the city hall by Lorena Ramos, director of the Provincial Electoral Delegation of Tungurahua.

Awards and achievements
Preceded by Gabriela Ulloa	Miss World Ecuador; 2010	Succeeded by Verónica Vargas
