= La Troncal =

La Troncal San Pablo de La Troncal
- Town
- Flag

- Location within Ecuador
- Coordinates: 2°24′0″S 79°19′48″W
- Country: Ecuador
- Province: Cañar
- Canton: La Troncal
- Establishment: 19 November 1975

Government
  - Mayor: Miriam Castro

Area
  - Town: 10.01 km^{2} (3.86 sq mi)

Population (2022 census)
  - Town: 39,600
  - Density: 3,960/km^{2} (10,200/sq mi)
- Climate: Aw

La Troncal, officially San Pablo de La Troncal is a town and largest city by population in the Cañar Province, Ecuador and the seat of La Troncal Canton.

The region that would become this significant town, was sparsely populated by farmers until the 1950s. The population began to grow in the 1950s, when migrants from Azuay, and the Cañar provinces began to settle in the area in search of new and better job opportunities.

Around the 1990s thanks to the growth of the sugar mill Aztra, migrants from Manabi also began to move in, by which the population was gradually growing in size and importance.

== Climate ==
Climate data for La Troncal (Pancho Negro), elevation 72 m (236 ft), (1961–1990)
Month	Jan	Feb	Mar	Apr	May	Jun	Jul	Aug	Sep	Oct	Nov	Dec	Year
Mean daily maximum °C (°F)	29.8 (85.6)	30.2 (86.4)	31.0 (87.8)	31.5 (88.7)	30.0 (86.0)	28.7 (83.7)	28.0 (82.4)	28.2 (82.8)	28.7 (83.7)	28.2 (82.8)	28.5 (83.3)	30.2 (86.4)	29.4 (85.0)
Daily mean °C (°F)	25.2 (77.4)	25.3 (77.5)	26.0 (78.8)	26.0 (78.8)	25.2 (77.4)	24.2 (75.6)	23.3 (73.9)	23.2 (73.8)	23.6 (74.5)	23.5 (74.3)	23.8 (74.8)	25.0 (77.0)	24.5 (76.1)
Mean daily minimum °C (°F)	21.1 (70.0)	21.2 (70.2)	21.2 (70.2)	21.3 (70.3)	21.1 (70.0)	20.1 (68.2)	19.5 (67.1)	19.3 (66.7)	19.2 (66.6)	19.7 (67.5)	19.7 (67.5)	20.6 (69.1)	20.3 (68.6)
Average precipitation mm (inches)	274.0 (10.79)	388.0 (15.28)	399.0 (15.71)	292.0 (11.50)	80.0 (3.15)	42.0 (1.65)	10.0 (0.39)	8.0 (0.31)	13.0 (0.51)	19.0 (0.75)	19.0 (0.75)	77.0 (3.03)	1,621 (63.82)
Source: FAO

== Notable persons ==
=== Miss Earth ===
Katherine Espín, Miss Earth 2016
