= Rosana Vinueza =

Ecuadorian politician and beauty pageant titleholder

Rosana Vinueza Estrada de Tama (6 February 1949 – 25 August 2009) was an Ecuadorian politician and beauty pageant titleholder. In 1969, she was named Miss Ecuador 1969, and was a participant in Miss Universe 1969. From there, she married and had four children, and went to work in the nonprofit sector. She was the manager of Fundación Natura, an environmental non-profit organization, and also guided Fundación Crecer as that non-profit organization was starting up.

Vinueza first became involved in politica in 1988, when she became a councillor of her hometown of Guayaquil. During Sixto Durán-Ballén's presidency in 1994, she was named Undersecretary of Social Welfare, remaining in that position through 1996. That year, she was nominated by Freddy Ehlers to be his Vice President during his 1996 presidential run. The move was considered controversial by supporters on both the left and right wings of Ecuadorian politics, due to her environmentalism and her support of Opus Dei, respectively; the ticket finished third with 21% of the vote.

After the failed presidential run, Vinueza was named Undersecretary of Tourism during Gustavo Noboa's presidency, serving from 2000 to 2003, then became Vice President of the Civic Board of Guayaquil in 2008. In 1999, Vinueza was diagnosed with cancer, which led to her death a decade later at the age of 60.

Awards and achievements
Preceded by Marcia Ramos	Miss Ecuador; 1969	Succeeded by Virginia Monteverde
Preceded by Priscila Álava	Miss Universe Ecuador; 1969	Succeeded by Zoila Montesinos
