= Teatro Bolívar =

Coordinates: 0°13′18″S 78°30′40″W

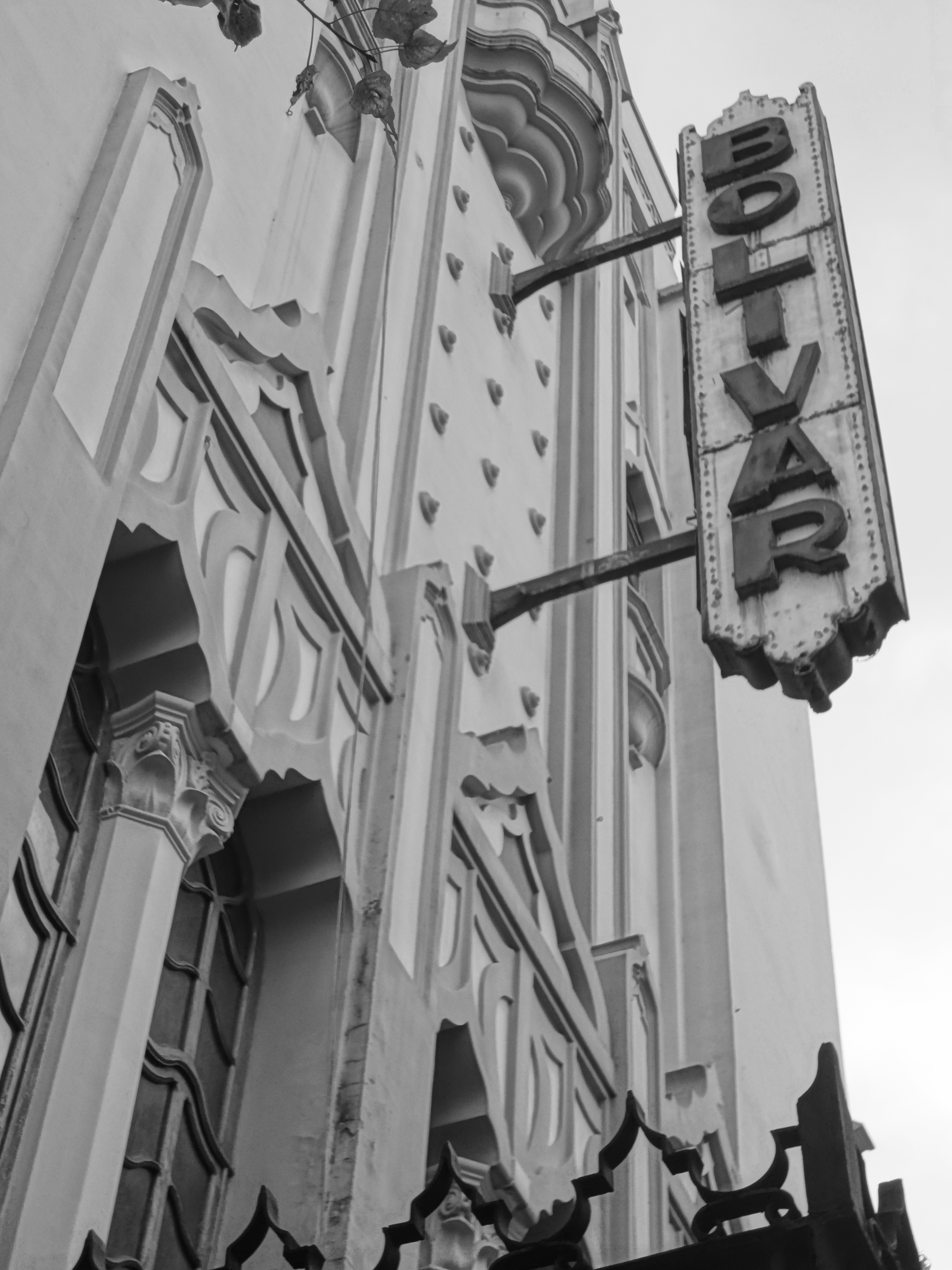
Front of the Teatro Bolívar

Teatro Bolívar is a theatre in Quito, Ecuador. It was established on 15 April 1933, with a capacity of 2400 spectators. It hosted many notable events, including the Miss Ecuador 1996 contest. In 1997, it underwent significant restoration, only to be plagued by fire two years later.
