= Miss Earth Ecuador =

Beauty contest

- Formation: 2003
- Type: Beauty pageant
- Headquarters: Guayaquil
- Location: Ecuador
- Members: Miss Earth
- Official language: Spanish
- National Director: María del Carmen de Aguayo (2003-2004); José Hidalgo (2005–2018); Katherine Espín (2019–2021); Oscar Salinas (2022-present)

Miss Earth Ecuador (Miss Tierra Ecuador) is one of the official preliminaries to the international Miss Earth beauty pageant, which was established in the Philippines in 2001. The pageant focuses mainly on promoting environmental causes and winners are chosen equally on their physical attributes as well as their understanding and knowledge of the issues affecting the Earth.

== History ==
Ecuador made a debut in Miss Earth 2003. Ecuador's representatives to Miss Earth, an annual international beauty pageant promoting environmental awareness, are elected and organized by Diosas Escuela de Misses under the directorship of Jose Hidalgo.

In 2005, Cristina Reyes was among the 16 semi-finalists in the Miss Earth 2005 competition, marking the first time that Ecuador entered the top 16 in Miss Earth. Andrea Leon, Miss Earth Ecuador 2008 won the Miss Friendship special award in the Miss Earth 2008. Leon was also included in the top 15 of the swimsuit competition, she placed fourth in the evening gown competition, and was a finalist in the talent competition. Jennifer Pazmiño made the highest placement for Ecuador in Miss Earth when she won the Miss Air 2010, one of the elemental court of Miss Earth. She was dethroned later that year when she chose to get married. Viktoria Shchukina from Russia took over the title as Miss Air 2010. Ecuador won its first Miss Earth title the following year, in the person of Olga Alava.

== Titleholders ==
The following is the list of Miss Ecuador Earth titleholders:

Year	Miss Earth Ecuador	Province	City	Placement	Other awards	Ref.
2003	Isabel Cristina Ontaneda Pinto	Pichincha	Quito			
2004	Maria Luisa Barrios Landivar	Guayas	Guayaquil			
2005	Cristina Eugenia Reyes Hidalgo	Guayas	Guayaquil	Top 16		
2006	María Magdalena Stahl Hurtado	Carchi	San Gabriel			
2007	María Verónica Ochoa Crespo	Azuay	Cuenca			
2008	Andrea Carolina León Janzso	El Oro	Machala		Miss Friendship	
2009	Diana Nataly Delgado Balseca	Manabí	Manta			
2010	Jennifer Stephanie Pazmiño Saldaña	Guayas	Guayaquil	Miss Air (Runner-up) (Resigned)	Best in Evening Gown; Top 5 Best in National Costume	
2011	Olga Mercedes Álava Vargas	Guayas	Guayaquil	Miss Earth 2011	Miss Runway	
2012	Estefanía Andrea Realpe Pérez	Pichincha	Quito	Dethroned		
2012	Tatiana Catalina Torres Rojas	Azuay	Cuenca		(gold) M.E Most Fun Beauty	
2013	Ana María Weir Yánez	Guayas	Guayaquil			
2014	María José Maza Solórzano	Guayas	Guayaquil		Miss City of Colors	
2015	Ángela Maritza Bonilla Zapata	Imbabura	Urcuquí		(silver) Cocktail Wear	
2016	Katherine Elizabeth Espín Gómez	Cañar	La Troncal	Miss Earth 2016	(gold) Darling Press; (gold) Resort Wear (Group 3); (gold) Long Gown (Group 3); (silver) Swimsuit (Group 3); (bronze) National Costume (The Americas); Miss Phoenix Petroleum; Miss Earth Hannah; Marco Polo: Star of the Night; Miss Rotary Best Body	
2017	Lessie Mishel Giler Sánchez	Manabí	Portoviejo		Miss Laus Group; Miss Rotary Club of Makati; Miss Earth-Hannah′s (3rd place); (bronze) Swimsuit (Group 1)	
2018	Diana Nicole Valdivieso Ortiz	Manabí	Portoviejo		(silver) National Costume (South America)	
2019	Karla Antonella Paz Marín	Esmeraldas	Esmeraldas		(bronze) Swimsuit (Water)	
2020	Gabriela Yalitza Monsalve Rivera	Manabí	Calceta			
2021	Did not compete					
2022	Susan Brigitte Toledo Arízaga	Santa Elena	Santa Elena		(gold) Best in Long Gown (Water)	
2023	Naomi Yanim Viteri Flores	Santo Domingo	Santo Domingo	Unplaced		
2024	Did not compete					
2025	Smirnova Peñafiel	Guayas	Naranjal			

- In 2010 edition, Jennifer Pazmiño from Ecuador resigned. Viktoria Shchukina from Russia took over the title as Miss Air 2010.
- In 2012 edition, Estefanía Realpe from Pichincha was dethroned. Tatiana Torres from Azuay took over the title as Miss Earth Ecuador 2012.

== Provincial rankings ==
Province	Total	Winning Year(s)
Guayas	6	2004, 2005, 2010, 2011, 2013, 2014
Manabí	2	2009, 2017, 2018, 2020
Azuay	2	2007, 2012*
Pichincha	2	2003, 2012*
Esmeraldas	1	2019
Carchi	1	2006
El Oro	1	2008
Imbabura	1	2015
Cañar	1	2016
Santa Elena	1	2024
Santo Domingo	1	2023

== See also ==
- Miss Ecuador
- Concurso Nacional de Belleza Ecuador
- Miss Teen Ecuador
- Mister Ecuador
