= Miss Ecuador 2012 =

Beauty pageant edition

- Date: March 16, 2012
- Presenters: Roberto Rodríguez; Jennifer Pazmiño
- Venue: Puerto Lucía Yacht Club, La Libertad, Santa Elena, Ecuador
- Broadcaster: Gama TV
- Entrants: 22
- Placements: 6
- Debuts: Santa Elena
- Withdrawals: Carchi; Galápagos
- Returns: Azuay; Cañar
- Winner: Carolina Aguirre; Guayas

Miss Ecuador 2012 was the 62nd edition of the Miss Ecuador pageant, held at Puerto Lucía Yacht Club in La Libertad, Santa Elena, Ecuador, on March 16, 2012.

Claudia Schiess of Galápagos crowned Carolina Aguirre of Guayas as her successor at the end of the event. Aguirre represented Ecuador at Miss Universe 2012, held in the United States.

== Results ==
=== Placements ===
Placement	Contestant
Miss Ecuador 2012	Guayas – Carolina Aguirre
Miss World Ecuador 2012	Esmeraldas – Cipriana Correia
Miss International Ecuador 2012	Santo Domingo – Tatiana Loor
Top 6	Esmeraldas – Sulay Castillo; Guayas – Nicole Cevallos; Manabí – Tatiana Chele

=== Special awards ===
Award	Contestant
Miss Congeniality	Pichincha – Ana Gabriela Barahona
Miss Photogenic	Guayas – Nicole Cevallos
Miss Yanbal	Guayas – Carolina Aguirre
Miss GKHair	El Oro – Gianella Gallardo
Miss Cielo	Guayas – Carolina Aguirre
Miss Like	Guayas – Carolina Aguirre
Miss Atayhua	Manabí – Lidia León
Best National Costume	Santo Domingo – Tatiana Loor

== Judges ==
- Lenín Moreno - Vice President of Ecuador
- Roberto Warson - Manager of Yanbal
- Astrid Carolina Herrera - Miss World 1984
- Carlos Coello - Manager of TC
- Marjorie Adum - Jeweler
- Liner Rodríguez - Manager of Coron
- Edith Arenas - Nutritionist
- Luis De Los Reyes - Manager of Renault
- Cadu Lopez - Model Manager
- Salvatore Laureano - Brazilian fashion designer

== Contestants ==
Twenty-two contestants competed for the title.

Province	Contestant	Age	Height (cm)	Height (ft)	Hometown
Azuay	María José Molina Marín	19	173	5 ft 8 in	Cuenca
Cañar	Johanna Alejandra Sacoto Orellana	19	173	5 ft 8 in	La Troncal
El Oro	María Gianella Gallardo Herrera	22	171	5 ft 7 in	Machala
Esmeraldas	Alexandra Sulay Castillo Velasco	21	175	5 ft 9 in	San Lorenzo
Esmeraldas	Cipriana Denisse Correia Macías	21	175	5 ft 9 in	Esmeraldas
Guayas	Andrea Carolina Aguirre Pérez	19	178	5 ft 10 in	Guayaquil
Guayas	Kimberly Fernanda Bravo Morán	21	177	5 ft 10 in	Guayaquil
Guayas	Valeria Nicole Cevallos Correa	21	173	5 ft 8 in	Guayaquil
Guayas	Ericka Jessenia Guerrero Mejía	21	171	5 ft 7 in	Guayaquil
Guayas	Christel Elizabeth Oyague Merizalde	22	171	5 ft 7 in	Guayaquil
Guayas	María del Carmen Moncayo Games	21	181	5 ft 11 in	Guayaquil
Guayas	Tatiana Genice Mondoñedo Farías	20	180	5 ft 11 in	Guayaquil
Guayas	Cecilia Carolina Chiavassa Chalá	18	182	6 ft 0 in	Guayaquil
Loja	Karen Ivonne Vélez Sánchez	18	181	5 ft 11 in	Loja
Manabí	Tatiana Paola Chele Villafuerte	20	177	5 ft 10 in	Manta
Manabí	Lidia Patricia León Guillén	20	174	5 ft 9 in	Portoviejo
Manabí	Melina Alejandra Moreano Zambrano	23	170	5 ft 7 in	Portoviejo
Pichincha	Ana Gabriela Barahona Andrade	23	172	5 ft 8 in	Quito
Pichincha	Estefanía Andrea Realpe Pérez	22	174	5 ft 9 in	Quito
Pichincha	Steffany Alexandra Tamayo Castro	20	173	5 ft 8 in	Quito
Santa Elena	Michelle Jazmín Sosa Govea	23	172	5 ft 8 in	Salinas
Santo Domingo de los Tsáchilas	Tatiana Katherine Loor Hidalgo	20	173	5 ft 8 in	Santo Domingo

== Notes ==
=== Debuts ===
- Santa Elena

=== Returns ===
Last Competed in:

- 2010:
  - Cañar
- 2009:
  - Azuay

=== Withdraws ===
- Carchi
- Galapagos

=== Reality ===
- January 9, 2012 was the first elimination where Michelle Sosa from Santa Elena was eliminated due to lack of documents necessary to compete in the Miss Ecuador pageant. The judges were: Ing. Andriana Loor, Mrs. Maria del Carmen de Aguayo, and Mrs. Marla Manseco.
- January 16, 2012 was the second elimination where Karen Vélez from Loja was eliminated due lack of compromise with coaches of the pageant. The judges were: Dr. Miguel Lebed, M. Antonio Sapúlveda, and M. Eliberto Rodríguez.
- January 23, 2012 was the third elimination where Johanna Sacoto from Cañar was eliminated for missing some courses in the reality Road to Miss Ecuador 2012. The judges are: Dr. Nelson Estrella, Dra. Mariana Mosquera, Dr. Ricardo Vargas, and Dra. Edith Arenas.
- January 30, 2012 was the fourth elimination where Cecilia Chiavassa from Guayas was eliminated by her own decision due she had an exam at her university the same day of the elimination.

=== Crossovers ===
- Ana Gabriela Barahona competed in Reina de Quito 2007, she is Reina de la Universidad Tecnológica Equinoccial de Quito, and Reina de la Policía Nacional.
- Estefanía Realpe competed in Reina de Quito 2007, where she was Miss Amistad (2nd Runner-up).
- Cipriana Correia was Reina de Esmeraldas 2008, and Virreina de Mi Tierra 2008.
- Karen Vélez was Señorita Fundación de Loja 2009, and competed in Elite Model Ecuador 2009.
- Lidia León was Miss Turismo Ecuador 2009.
- Cecilia Chiavassa competed in Reina de Guayaquil 2010.
- Christel Oyague competed in Reina de Guayaquil 2010.
- Tatiana Loor competed in Reina de Santo Domingo 2010, she was Miss Solidaridad (2nd Runner-up).
- Kimberly Bravo competed in Miss Model of the World 2010 where she placed on top 26.
- Nicole Cavallos competed in Miss Teen World 2010.
- Steffany Tamayo competed in Miss Pacífico Ecuador 2011, she was 1st Runner-up.
- Johanna Sacoto was Virreina de La Troncal, also she competed in Reina de la Feria Nacional de la Minería 2011.
- Sulay Castillo competed in Reina de Mundial de la Rosa 2011.
