= Verónica Vargas =

Ecuadorian beauty pageant titleholder (born 1989)

- Born: María Verónica Vargas Granja; 1989 (age 36–37)
- Height: 1.75 m (5 ft 9 in)
- Beauty pageant titleholder
- Title: Miss World Ecuador 2011
- Hair color: Brown
- Eye color: Brown
- Major competitions: Miss Ecuador 2011 (1st Runner-up) (Miss Photogenic); Miss World 2011

María Verónica Vargas Granja (born 1989) is an Ecuadorian model and beauty pageant titleholder who was crowned Miss World Ecuador 2011 and who represented country in the 2011 Miss World pageant.

== Early life ==
Vargas is taking a bachelor's degree in journalist at Universidad de Eloy Alfaro de Manta and speaks Spanish and English. She enjoys reading and she was Nereida de la Armada del Ecuador.

== Miss Ecuador 2011 ==
Vargas, who stands 1.75 m (5 ft 9 in) tall, competed as the representative of Guayas, one of 19 finalists in her country's national beauty pageant, Miss Ecuador 2011, held on March 17, 2011 in Santo Domingo, where she obtained the Miss Photogenic award and became the eventual the 1st Runner-up, gaining the right to represent Ecuador in Miss World 2011.

== Miss World 2011 ==
As the representative at the 2011 Miss World pageant, Verónica failed to succeed Miss World titleholder, Alexandria Mills of United States.

Awards and achievements
Preceded by Ana Galarza	Miss World Ecuador; 2011	Succeeded by Cipriana Correia
