= Miss Universe Ecuador 1970 =

- Date: May 23, 1970
- Venue: Club Nacional de Guayaquil, Guayaquil, Guayas, Ecuador
- Entrants: 16
- Placements: 4
- Debuts: El Oro; Esmeraldas; Guayas; Manabí
- Winner: Zoila Montesinos; Manabí

Miss Universe Ecuador 1970 was the 17th Miss Ecuador pageant, held at the National Club of Guayaquil in Guayaquil, Ecuador, on May 23, 1970. Directed by the Diario El Universo. The seventeenth edition of Miss Ecuador had two elections.

They proclaimed Zoila Montesinos Rivera as Miss Ecuador 1970, also won the title of Pearl of the Pacific, we represent ourselves in Miss Universe 1970 in Miami and in Miss Expo International 1970 in Osaka. The other edition was made July 16, 1970 by El Telégrafo. There were 11 candidates where Sofia Monteverde Nimbriotis was also elected as Miss Ecuador 1970. She represented us at Miss World 1970 in London. These two ladies are entitled to as Miss Ecuador, which the Organization Miss Ecuador recognizes as bearers of the title.

== Results ==
=== Placements ===
| Placement | Contestant |
|---|---|
| Miss Ecuador 1970 | Manabí – Zoila Montesinos |
| 1st Runner-Up | Guayas – Rocío Kam Faggioni |
| 2nd Runner-Up | Esmeraldas – Betty Álvarez |
| 3rd Runner-Up | Guayas – Ana Luisa Aguilera |

== Contestants ==
Sixteen contestants competed for the title.

| Province | Contestant | Age | Height(cm) | Height(ft) | Hometown |
|---|---|---|---|---|---|
| El Oro | Bella Minuche Trujillo | 18 | 168 | 5 ft 6 in | Machala |
| Esmeraldas | Betty Álvarez Vásquez | 19 | 173 | 5 ft 8 in | Esmeraldas |
| Guayas | Patricia Cevallos | 17 | 168 | 5 ft 6 in | Ancón |
| Guayas | Jenny Cucalón | 18 | 170 | 5 ft 7 in | Ballenita |
| Guayas | Ana Luisa Aguilera | 18 | 169 | 5 ft 7 in | Guayaquil |
| Guayas | Zoila Reyes | 20 | 169 | 5 ft 7 in | La Libertad |
| Guayas | Loreley Domenech | 17 | 169 | 5 ft 7 in | Manglaralto |
| Guayas | Rocío Kam Faggioni | 19 | 167 | 5 ft 6 in | Playas |
| Guayas | Maura Gil Loor | 19 | 167 | 5 ft 6 in | Salinas |
| Guayas | Mercedes Peña | 18 | 170 | 5 ft 7 in | Salinas |
| Guayas | Guillermina Carrión | 17 | 166 | 5 ft 5 in | Santa Elena |
| Guayas | Patricia Mazzini | 18 | 168 | 5 ft 6 in | Santa Elena |
| Guayas | Cristina del Rosario Vélez | 19 | 168 | 5 ft 6 in | Santa Elena |
| Manabí | Conchita Navia Murgueito | 18 | 170 | 5 ft 7 in | Bahía de Caráquez |
| Manabí | Ruth Andrade Baird | 18 | 168 | 5 ft 6 in | Manta |
| Manabí | Zoila Montesinos Rivera | 17 | 172 | 5 ft 8 in | Jipijapa |
