= María Fernanda Cornejo =

Ecuadorian fashion model and beauty queen (born 1989)

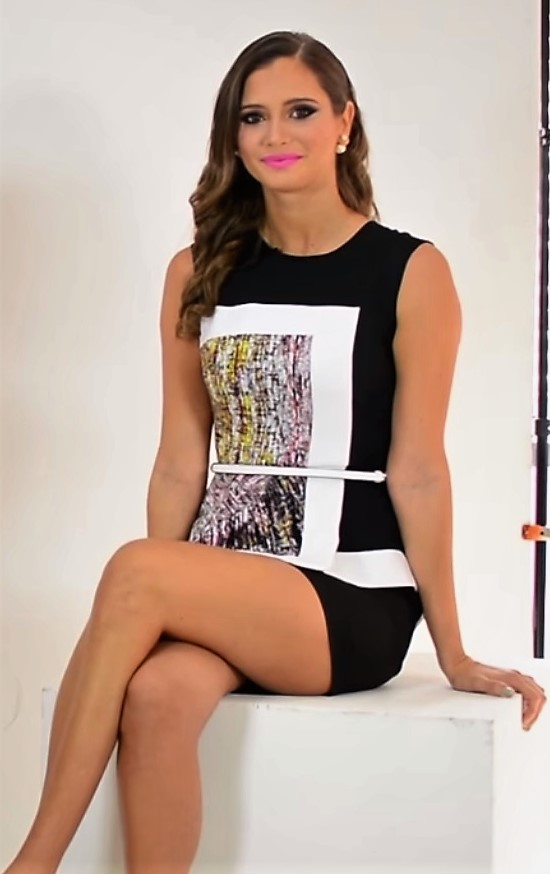
- Cornejo on Mariela TV in 2015
- Born: María Fernanda Cornejo Alfaro; March 24, 1989 (age 37)
- Height: 1.80 m (5 ft 11 in)
- Beauty pageant titleholder
- Title: Miss International 2011
- Hair color: Blonde
- Eye color: Hazel
- Major competitions: Miss Ecuador 2011 (Miss Ecuador International) (Best National Costume); Miss International 2011 (Winner) (Miss Stature) (Miss Beauty)

María Fernanda Cornejo Alfaro (born March 24, 1989) is an Ecuadorian fashion model and beauty queen who was crowned Miss International 2011. She has modeled for fashion companies including Chloé, DKNY, and Dior.

== Early life ==
Fernanda Cornejo lives and works in Guayaquil, Ecuador. She is one of the most requested models in her country. Cornejo is taking a bachelor's degree in nutrition at UEES and speaks Spanish. She enjoys singing, going to the beach, playing basketball and doing pilates. Now she is a Top Model from Elite Models in United States.

== Miss Ecuador 2011 ==
Fernanda, who stands 1.80 m (5 ft 11 in) tall, competed as the representative of Pichincha, She was the favorite contestant among Ecuadorians to win the crown in her country's national beauty pageant, Miss Ecuador 2011, broadcast live on March 17, 2011, from Santo Domingo, where she obtained the Best National Costume award and became the eventual second runner-up, gaining the right to represent Ecuador in Miss International 2011.

== Miss International 2011 ==
As the official representative of her country to the 2011 Miss International pageant, the titleholder, Elizabeth Mosquera of Venezuela crowned her as Miss International 2011.

Awards and achievements
Preceded by (Venezuela) Elizabeth Mosquera	Miss International; 2011	Succeeded by (Japan) Ikumi Yoshimatsu
Preceded by Andrea Suárez	Miss International Ecuador; 2011	Succeeded by Tatiana Loor
