= Sara Chacón Zúñiga =

Ecuadorian beauty queen

- Born: June 1914; Guayaquil, Ecuador
- Died: January 1998 (aged 83); Virginia, U.S.
- Known for: First Miss Ecuador (1930)
- Spouse: Carlos Freile Espinel

Sara Chacón Zúñiga, or "Sarita" Chacón Zúñiga (Guayaquil, Ecuador, June 1914 – Virginia, U.S., January 1998) became the first winner of the Miss Ecuador title, awarded on February 11, 1930. Due to international political upheaval, she claimed the title for 25 years until another contest was held in 1955.

She died in Virginia in January 1998.

== Marriage ==
On December 7, 1930 Chacón married Carlos Freile Espinel despite her parents' disapproval.
