= Delary Stoffers =

Ecuadorian Beauty Pageant titleholder

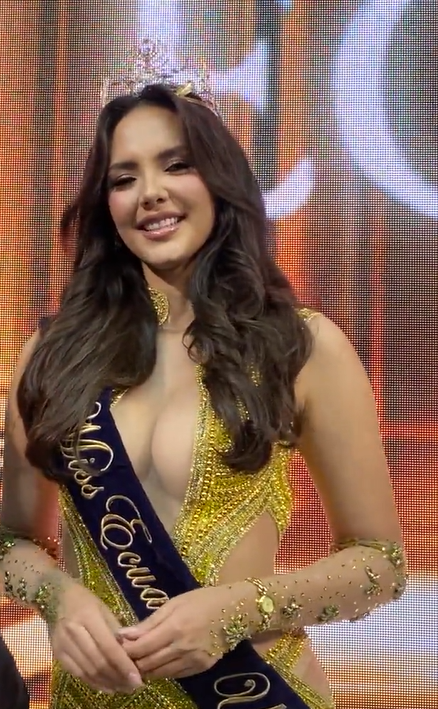
- Stoffers in 2024
- Born: Guayaquil, Ecuador
- Beauty pageant titleholder
- Title: Miss Ecuador 2023
- Major competitions: Miss Ecuador 2023 (Winner); Miss Universe 2023 (Unplaced); Miss Charm 2024 (Top 10)

Delary Stoffers is an Ecuadorian beauty pageant titleholder who was crowned Miss Ecuador 2023. She represented Ecuador at Miss Universe 2023.

== Biography ==
Delary Stoffers, was born in Guayaquil, Ecuador to a Dutch father, who died when she was six, and an Ecuadorian mother. She is a business administration student, and an animal rights activist.

== Pageantry ==
=== Miss Guayas ===
She entered and won Miss Guayas 2020.

=== Concurso Nacional de la Belleza Ecuador ===
In 2020 she represented the Guayas Province in the CNB Ecuador. Initially, 20 contestants were selected to compete for the title of Miss World Ecuador 2020. But, due to the COVID-19 pandemic, 10 contestants decided not to compete, postponing their participation until 2021, including Delary who also withdrew from participating in the next edition.

=== Miss Ecuador 2023 ===
She entered and won Miss Ecuador 2023, and then represented Ecuador at Miss Universe 2023, held in El Salvador.

Awards and achievements
Preceded by Nayelhi González	Miss Ecuador; 2023	Succeeded by Eunices Rivadeneira
Preceded by Nayelhi González	Miss Universe Ecuador; 2023	Succeeded by Mara Topić
Preceded by Georgette Kalil (resigned)	Miss Charm Ecuador; 2024	Succeeded by Incumbent
