= Andrea Suárez (beauty pageant contestant) =

Ecuadorian beauty pageant titleholder (born 1987)

- Born: Andrea Ivonne Suárez Melgar; January 13, 1987 (age 39)
- Height: 1.80 m (5 ft 11 in)
- Beauty pageant titleholder
- Title: Miss International Ecuador 2010
- Hair color: Brown
- Eye color: Brown
- Major competitions: Miss Ecuador 2010 (2nd Runner-up); Miss International 2010 (Unplaced)

Andrea Suárez (born 1987) is an Ecuadorian beauty pageant titleholder who was crowned Miss International Ecuador 2010 and represented her country in the 2010 Miss International.

== Miss Ecuador 2010 ==
Andrea, who stands 1.80 m (5 ft 11 in) tall, competed as the representative of Loja, one of 15 finalists in her country's national beauty pageant, Miss Ecuador 2010, broadcast live in March 2010 from Quito, where she obtained the Best National Costume award and became the eventual the 2nd Runner-up, gaining the right to represent Ecuador in Miss International 2010.

== Miss International 2009 ==
As the official representative of her country to the 2010 Miss International pageant, Andrea competed in this event in China where she was unplaced and the winner was Elizabeth Mosquera from Venezuela.

Awards and achievements
| Preceded by Isabella Chiriboga | Miss International Ecuador; 2010 | Succeeded by Fernanda Cornejo |
