= Laritza Párraga =

Ecuadorian actress, model, DJ, producer and beauty pageant titleholder

Laritza Libeth Párraga Arteaga
- Born: Laritza Libeth Párraga Arteaga; 14 July 1993 (age 33); El Carmen, Manabí, Ecuador
- Height: 1.74 m (5 ft 9 in)
- Beauty pageant titleholder
- Title: Miss World Ecuador 2013
- Hair color: Brown
- Eye color: Light Brown
- Major competitions: Miss Pacífico Ecuador 2013; (1st Runner-Up); Miss World Ecuador 2013; (Winner); Miss World 2013; (Unplaced); Miss World Cup 2014; (2nd Runner-Up)

Laritza Párraga (born July 14, 1993) is an Ecuadorian actress, model, DJ, producer and beauty pageant titleholder who was crowned Miss World Ecuador 2013 and represented Ecuador at Miss World 2013 pageant.

== Early life ==
Párraga was born in El Carmen, Manabí. She speaks English and Spanish.

== Pageants ==
Párraga competed in Miss Pacífico Ecuador 2012 as Reina de Santo Domingo, representing her province. She was first runner-up.

Párraga was selected to represent Santo Domingo de los Tsáchilas Province in Miss Ecuador 2013, but she withdrew from the pageant in February.

Párraga represented her province in the national pageant which she won on July 4, 2013. She also won the titles of Miss Photogenic and the Best National Costume award.

Párraga represented Ecuador at the Miss World 2013 pageant on September 28, 2013, held at Bali Nusa Dua Convention Center in Bali, Indonesia.

Párraga represented Ecuador at the Miss World Cup Brazil 2014 beauty pageant held in Rust, Germany. Miss World Cup is a competition that takes place every four years with 32 participants representing the 32 countries playing in the FIFA Soccer World Cup tournament. She made it to the Top 3 and finished as second runner up.
