= Estefanía Realpe =

Miss Ecuador 2012, contestant in Miss Earth 2012

- Born: Estefanía Andrea Realpe Pérez; May 16, 1989 (age 37); Quito, Ecuador
- Height: 1.74 m (5 ft 9 in)
- Beauty pageant titleholder
- Title: Miss Exclusive Ecuador 2012, Miss Earth Ecuador 2012
- Hair color: Black
- Eye color: Brown
- Major competitions: Reina de Quito 2007 (2nd Runner-up) (2nd Runner-up); Miss Ecuador 2012 (Unplaced); Miss Exclusive of the World 2012 (Top 15); Miss Earth Ecuador 2012 (Winner); Miss World Ecuador 2014 (4th Runner-Up)

Estefanía Realpe (born May 16, 1989 in Quito, Ecuador) is a model and beauty pageant titleholder who was crowned Miss Earth Ecuador 2012 and was dethroned a fews days before to compete at Miss Earth 2012.

She was born in Quito, Realpe speaks Spanish and English.

Estefanía, who stands 1.74 m (5 ft 8 1/2 in) tall, competed as a representative of Pichincha, one of the 18 contestants in her country's national beauty pageant, Miss Ecuador 2012, broadcast live on March 16, 2012 from La Libertad, where she was unplaced. Realpe was designed as Miss Earth Ecuador 2013 by the national director, José Hidalgo, on August 29, 2012, however, to enable her to compete in Miss Earth 2012, she was dethroned.

She is the first woman who competed at the three major beauty pageants in Ecuador: Miss Ecuador in 2012, Miss Earth Ecuador in 2012, and Miss World Ecuador in 2014.

Awards and achievements
Preceded by Olga Álava	Miss Earth Ecuador; 2012 dethroned	Succeeded by Tatiana Torres
