= Miss International 2008 =

Beauty pageant edition

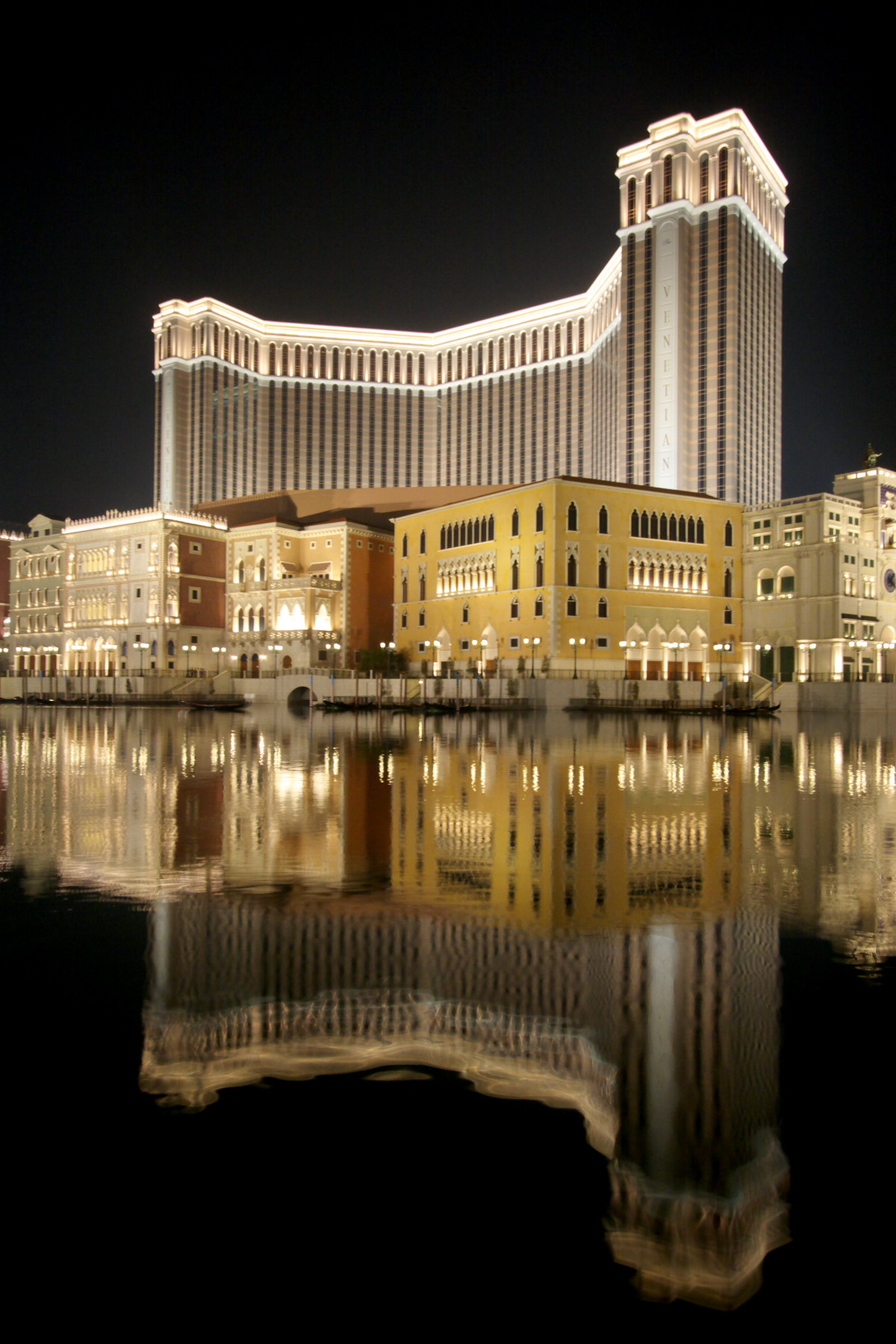
- Date: November 8, 2008
- Presenters: Eric Tsang; Dodo Cheng; Astrid Chan
- Entertainment: Hacken Lee; Priscilla Chan; Miriam Yeung
- Venue: Venetian Arena, Macau, China
- Broadcaster: TDM; TVB; TV Tokyo
- Entrants: 63
- Placements: 12
- Withdrawals: Armenia; Chile; Costa Rica; Egypt; Honduras; Nigeria
- Returns: Bahamas; Belgium; Hawaii; Italy; Macau; Norway; Sweden; Zambia
- Winner: Alejandra Andreu; Spain
- Congeniality: Georgina Cisneros; El Salvador
- Best National Costume: Nuraisa Lispier; Aruba
- Photogenic: Alejandra Andreu; Spain

Miss International 2008 was the 48th Miss International pageant, held at Venetian Arena in Macau, China on November 8, 2008.

63 contestants from all over the world competed for the crown, marking the biggest turnout in the 48 years of the pageant, surpassing the previous of 61 during last year pageant. The contestants also paid a visit to Hong Kong, Tokyo. Miss International 2007, Priscila Perales of Mexico, crowned her successor Alejandra Andreu of Spain as the new Miss International.

== Results ==
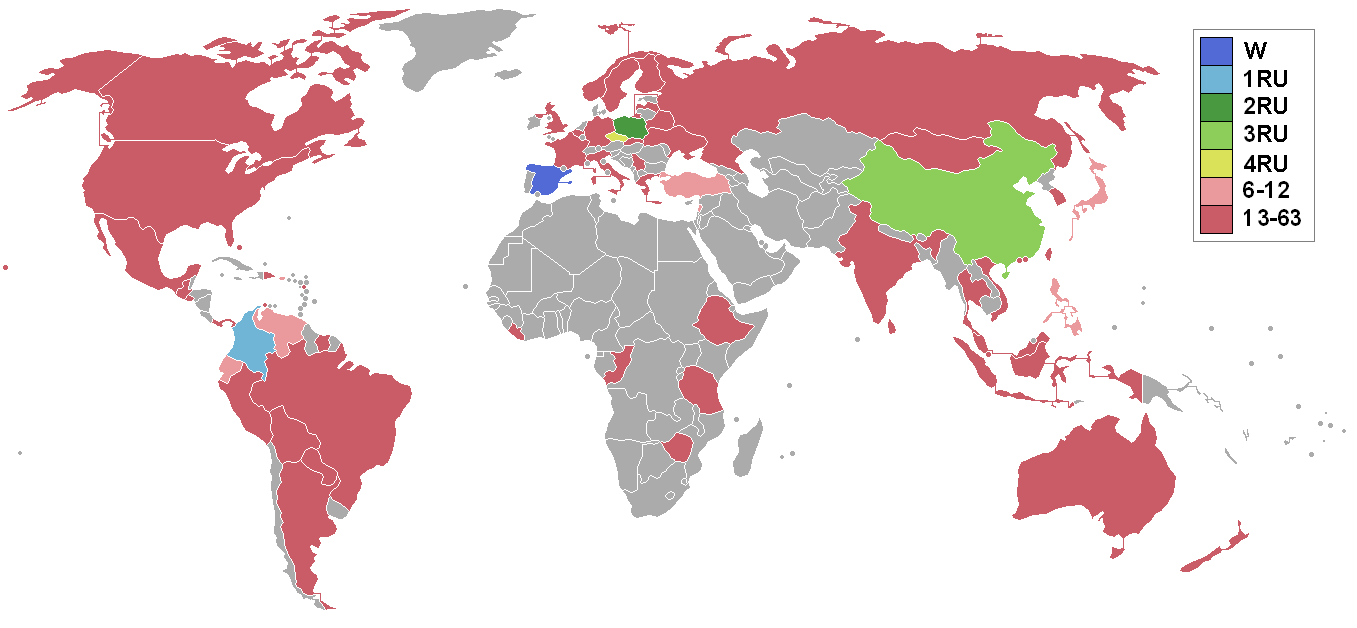
Countries and territories which sent delegates and results for Miss International 2008

=== Placements ===
Placement	Contestant
Miss International 2008	Spain – Alejandra Andreu
1st Runner-Up	Colombia – Cristina Díaz-Granados
2nd Runner-Up	Poland – Anna Tarnowska
3rd Runner-Up	China – Chang Wen Liu
4th Runner-Up	Czech Republic – Zuzana Putnářová
Top 12	Ecuador – Jennifer Pazmiño; Japan – Kyoko Sugiyama; Lebanon – Jessica Kahawaty; Philippines – Patricia Fernandez; Puerto Rico – Miriam Pabón; Turkey – Gülsün Uslu; Venezuela – Dayana Colmenares

=== Special awards ===
Award	Contestant
Best National Costume	Aruba – Nuraisa Lispier
Miss Friendship	El Salvador – Georgina Cisneros
Miss Photogenic	Spain – Alejandra Andreu
Natural Beauty	Belarus – Tatiana Ryneiskaya

== Contestants ==
Country/Territory	Contestant	Age	Hometown
Argentina	Yésica Di Vincenzo	20	Mar del Plata
Aruba	Nuraisa Lispier	23	San Nicolaas
Australia	Kristal Hammond	22	Waroona
Bahamas	Amy Knowles	22	San Salvador Island
Belarus	Tatiana Ryneiskaya	21	Minsk
Belgium	Charlotte Van De Vijver	24	East Flanders
Bolivia	Paula Andrea Peñarrieta	19	Cochabamba
Brazil	Vanessa Lima Vidal	24	Fortaleza
Canada	Elena Semikina	25	Toronto
China	Chang Wen Liu	21	Beijing
Colombia	Cristina Díaz-Granados	22	Valledupar
Czech Republic	Zuzana Putnářová	21	Ostrava
Dominican Republic	Claudia Peña	19	Bonao
Ecuador	Jennifer Pazmiño	20	Guayaquil
El Salvador	Georgina Cisneros	20	San Salvador
Ethiopia	Nardos Desta	20	Addis Ababa
Finland	Jaana Taanila	18	Haukipudas
France	Vicky Michaud	21	Paray Le Monial
Germany	Katja Bondarenko	21	Niedersachsen
Greece	Sofia Roditi	24	Athens
Guadeloupe	Nancy Fleurival	24	Abymes
Guatemala	Wendy Albizurez	19	Chimaltenango Department
Hawaii	Serena Karnagy	18	Honolulu
Hong Kong	Sire Ma	20	Chongqing
India	Radha Bhrahmbhatt	19	Northwood
Indonesia	Duma Riris Silalahi	24	Balige
Italy	Luna Voce	20	Crotone
Japan	Kyoko Sugiyama	23	Kanagawa
Latvia	Kristīne Djadenko	24	Riga
Lebanon	Jessica Kahawaty	20	Sydney
Liberia	Telena Casell	24	Monrovia
Macau	Florence Loi	23	Macau
Malaysia	Zi Wei Tham	23	Kuala Lumpur
Mexico	Lorenza Bernot	19	Cuernavaca
Mongolia	Ochgerel Khulangoo	20	Ulaanbaatar
New Zealand	Rhonda Grant	23	Napier
Norway	Lisa-Mari Moen Jünge	20	Molde
Panama	Alejandra Arias	20	Panama City
Paraguay	Rossana Galeano	19	Eusebio Ayala
Peru	Massiel Vidal	22	Lima
Philippines	Patricia Fernandez	22	Quezon City
Poland	Anna Tarnowska	23	Szczecin
Puerto Rico	Miriam Pabón	23	Las Piedras
Republic of the Congo	Blanda Eboundit	22	Brazzaville
Russia	Ekaterina Grushanina	22	Chelyabinsk
Serbia	Sanja Radinovic	19	Belgrade
Singapore	Tok Wee Ee	18	Singapore
Slovakia	Lenka Sýkorová	21	Bratislava
South Korea	Kim Min-jeong	19	Daegu
Spain	Alejandra Andreu	19	Zaragoza
Sri Lanka	Faith Landers	22	Colombo
Suriname	Mireille Nederbiel	24	Paramaribo
Sweden	Jenny Jansson	21	Nässjö
Taiwan	Ting Yen Yu	24	Taipei
Tanzania	Jamillah Nyangasa	23	Kilimanjaro
Thailand	Panasrom Kumkit	19	Hat Yai
Turkey	Gülsün Uslu	21	İzmir
Ukraine	Yulia Galichenko	23	Mariupol'
United Kingdom	Nieve Jennings	21	Bishopbriggs
United States	Kelly Best	22	Troy
Venezuela	Dayana Colmenares	23	Maracay
Vietnam	Cao Thùy Dương	20	Yên Bái
Zambia	Chipo Mulubisha	20	Lusaka

== Notes ==
=== Returns ===
- Last competed in 1992:
  - Italy
- Last competed in 1996:
  - Belgium
- Last competed in 2004:
  - Hawaii
  - Zambia
- Last competed in 2005:
  - Bahamas
  - Macau
  - Sweden
- Last competed in 2006:
  - Norway

=== Withdrawals ===
- Armenia
- Chile
- Costa Rica
- Egypt
- Honduras
- Nigeria
