= El Carmen Canton =

- Canton
- Location of Manabí Province in Ecuador.

- El Carmen Canton in Manabí Province
- Coordinates: 1.3147°S 80.0169°W
- Country: Ecuador
- Province: Manabí Province
- Time zone: UTC-5 (ECT)

El Carmen Canton is a canton of Ecuador, located in the Manabí Province. Its capital is the town of El Carmen. Its population at the 2001 census was 69,998.

== Demographics ==
Ethnic groups as of the Ecuadorian census of 2010:

- Mestizo 75.6%
- Montubio 13.1%
- Afro-Ecuadorian 6.0%
- White 5.0%
- Indigenous 0.1%
- Other 0.2%
