= Claudia Schiess =

Ecuadorian beauty queen

- Born: Claudia Elena Schiess Fretz; Puerto Ayora, Ecuador
- Education: Universidad Del Pacífico – Ecuador
- Occupations: Hotelier, TV and radio host
- Title: Miss Ecuador 2011
- Spouse: Alfredo Vera
- Website: claudiaschiess.com

Claudia Elena Schiess Fretz is an Ecuadorian beauty pageant titleholder who won Miss Ecuador 2011, and represented her country at Miss Universe 2011, where she was unplaced. On October 22, 2011, she won Miss American Continent 2011, becoming the first Ecuadorian to achieve this title.

== Biography ==
Claudia Schiess has a German father and a Swiss mother. Schiess graduated with a BSBA from Universidad Del Pacifico – Ecuador. She is fluent in Spanish, English, French and German.

Schiess is a professional make-up artist.

== Career ==
=== Miss Supranational 2010 ===
Schiess represented Ecuador at Miss Supranational, held on August 28, 2010, in Plock, Poland.

=== Miss Ecuador 2011 ===
Schiess won Miss Ecuador 2011 representing Galápagos Province, on March 17, 2011, in Santo Domingo de los Tsáchilas; She also won, Best Figure, Best Countenance and Best Hair

=== Miss Universe 2011 ===
Schiess represented Ecuador at Miss Universe 2011 held in Credit Card Hall in São Paulo, Brazil, on September 12, 2011, and was unplaced.

=== Miss American Continent 2011 ===
Schiess represented Ecuador at Miss American Continent in Spanish Miss Continente Americano (currently called Miss United Continents) in the same year, held in the Palacio de Cristal in Guayaquil, Ecuador on October 22, 2011. She was the first Ecuadorian to win the title.

=== Television ===
Schiess was a presenter for two years on the morning show Café TV, which aired in July 2016 and was a presenter for BBC specials.

=== Hotelier ===
In Santa Cruz, she opened the Cucuve Suites hotel.

=== Radio ===
She currently hosts a local radio program "Entre santos y pecadores", on Radio Forever (92.5 FM).
