= Jennifer Pazmiño =

Ecuadorian model (born 1987)

- Born: Jennifer Stephanie Pazmiño Saldaña; December 29, 1987 (age 38); New York, U.S
- Occupations: Beauty pageant titleholder; TV Host; Model; Radio Host
- Height: 1.78 m (5 ft 10 in)
- Spouse: Wladimir Vargas (m. 2011; div. 2018)
- Children: 2
- Beauty pageant titleholder
- Title: Miss International Ecuador 2008; Miss Earth Ecuador 2010; Miss Earth Air 2010
- Years active: 2008-present
- Hair color: Brown
- Eye color: Hazel
- Major competitions: Miss Ecuador 2008; (Miss Ecuador International); Miss International 2008; (Top 12); Miss Earth 2010; (Miss Air; Resigned)

Jennifer Stephanie Pazmiño Saldaña (born December 29, 1987) is an Ecuadorian-American TV host, radio host, model and beauty pageant titleholder who placed as the second runner-up at Miss Ecuador 2008, representing Guayaquil. As the second runner-up Pazmiño was crowned Miss Ecuador International 2008. She represented Ecuador at Miss International 2008, where she placed Top 12. Two years later Pazmiño was appointed and crowned as Miss Earth Ecuador 2010 by Jose Hidalgo her National Director. Pazmiño represented Ecuador at Miss Earth 2010 she became the first delegate from Ecuador to win the title Miss Earth-Air elemental crown.

== Early life ==
Pazmiño was born in New York, U.S. and has American nationality. Her parents were living for 20 years in the U.S., but she grew up in Guayaquil, Ecuador and is the daughter of Manuel Pazmiño and Mariana Saldaña. She has a brother. She is a graduate in social communication at Universidad Santa Maria. She is fluent in Spanish and English. She graduated with honors from college and university.

== Personal life ==
On January 31, 2011, in Salinas, Santa Elena, she married Quitonian Master Wladimir Vargas. Pazmiño announced being pregnant in February to her first son Wladimir in 2011 and to her second son Maximiliano in 2013 both son to Wladimir Vargas. In October 2018, Pazmiño and Vargas decided to divorce peacefully. She maintains a friendly relationship with Wladimir for their children. She currently lives and works in Guayaquil.

== Miss Ecuador 2008 ==
Pazmiño, began her pageantry career at Miss Ecuador 2008 pageant held in Cemexpo, Quito, where she was 2nd Runner-Up out of 19 contestants. After that Pazmiño was crowned Miss Ecuador International 2008 by its final placement. She represented her city Guayaquil. Pazmiño won the award Miss Sedal (Best Hair).

== Miss International 2008 ==
As Miss Ecuador International 2008, Pazmiño won the right to represent Ecuador at the Miss International 2008, held on November 7 in Macau. Where she placed Top 12. She was the first Ecuadorian to take the highest placement for Ecuador in this pageant, since Lourdes Hernández's Top 15 in 1970.

== Miss Earth 2010 ==
Pazmiño was crowned Miss Earth Ecuador 2010 by Jose Hidalgo her pageant coach. Being a major frontrunner for the crown. She represented Ecuador in Miss Earth 2010 on 4 December 2010 held at Vinpearl Land Amphitheater in Vietnam. At the end of the event, Pazmiño was crowned as Miss Earth-Air 2010 by her predecessor, Sandra Seifert of the Philippines. She was the first Ecuadorian to reach the elemental crown. Pazmiño won the following awards: Best in Evening Gown, Best in Swimsuit (Top 5), Miss PNJ, Best National Costume (Top 5).

== Miss Earth-Air 2010 Reign ==
As Miss Earth-Air was going to work towards keeping the air clean for future generations during her reigning. Pazmiño resigned from her title in January due to marriage to her husband. The Miss Earth appointed Viktoria Shchukina as successor Jennifer Pazmiño.

Awards and achievements
Preceded by Jéssica Ortíz	Miss International Ecuador; 2008	Succeeded by Isabella Chiriboga
Preceded by Diana Delgado	Miss Earth Ecuador; 2010	Succeeded by Olga Álava
Preceded by (Philippines) Sandra Seifert	Miss Earth Air; 2010; Resigned	Succeeded by (Russia) Viktoria Shchukina
