= La Troncal Canton =

- Canton
- Flag

- Location of Cañar Province in Ecuador.

- La Troncal Canton in Cañar Province
- Coordinates: 2°24′0″S 79°19′48″W
- Country: Ecuador
- Province: Cañar Province
- Capital: La Troncal

Government
  - Mayor: Rómulo Alcivar

Area
  - Total: 369.6 km^{2} (142.7 sq mi)
- Elevation: 112 m (367 ft)

Population (2022 census)
  - Total: 62,103
  - Density: 168.0/km^{2} (435.2/sq mi)
- Time zone: UTC-5 (ECT)

La Troncal Canton is a canton of Ecuador, located in the Cañar Province. Its capital is the town of La Troncal. Its population at the 2001 census was 44,268.
