= Miss Ecuador =

National beauty pageant in Ecuador

Organización Miss Ecuador
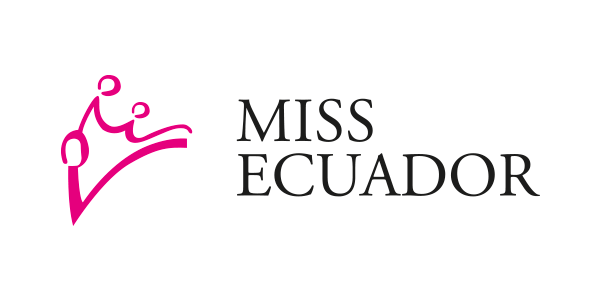
- Formation: 1955; 71 years ago
- Headquarters: Guayaquil
- Location: Ecuador
- Official language: Spanish
- President: María del Carmen de Aguayo
- Key people: Marco Tapia
- Affiliations: Miss International; Reina Hispanoamericana; Miss United Continents; Miss Landscapes International; Miss Cosmo
- Website: www.missecuador.tv

Miss Ecuador is a national beauty pageant in Ecuador. The current Miss Ecuador is Eunice Rivadeneira from Guayas. She won the title on 17 August 2024, and will represent Ecuador at Miss International 2025.

== History ==
The first winner of the Miss Ecuador pageant was Sara Chacón Zúñiga from Guayas in 1930. The contest was then inactive until 1955 when Leonor Carcache from Guayas won the first modern title of Miss Ecuador, and was the first representative of the country at Miss Universe 1955.

Representatives from the 24 provinces that make up Ecuador compete annually for the title of Miss Ecuador. Since 2024, Miss Ecuador has sent its winner to Miss International. In addition, the pageant also selects candidates to represent Ecuador in other international contests such as Reina Hispanoamericana, Miss United Continents and Miss Landscapes International. In the past, Miss Ecuador sent representatives to: Miss Universe until 2023, Miss World until 2012, Miss Earth until 2004, Miss Supranational until 2017 and Miss Grand International until 2018.

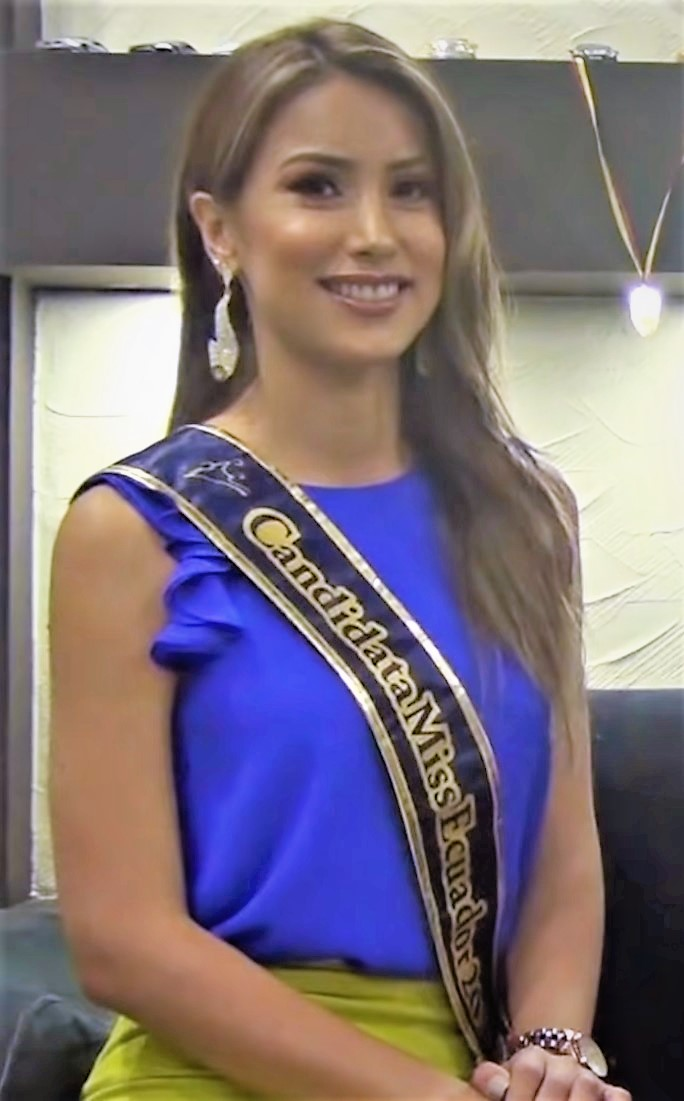
Leyla Espinoza, Miss Ecuador 2020

== Titleholders ==
The following titleholders have represented Ecuador in three of the Big Four major international beauty pageants for women. These are Miss World, Miss Universe, and Miss International with the exception of Miss Earth which has a separate national franchise in Ecuador.

Edition	Date	Venue	Miss Ecuador	Representation	International
1930	9 February 1930	Teatro Olmedo; Guayaquil, Guayas	Sara Chacón Zúñiga	Guayas: Guayaquil	Miss América Latina 1930
Inactive between 1931 and 1954
1955	4 June 1955	Teatro Ponce; Guayaquil, Guayas	Leonor María Carcache Rodríguez	Guayas: Guayaquil	Miss Universe 1955
1956	26 June 1956	Piscina Olímpica Municipal; Guayaquil, Guayas	María Mercedes Flores Espín	Guayas: Guayaquil	Miss Universe 1956
1957	31 May 1957	Teatro Olmedo; Guayaquil, Guayas	Patricia Juliana Benítez Wright	Guayas: Guayaquil	Miss Universe 1957
1958	20 June 1958	Teatro Olmedo; Guayaquil, Guayas	Alicia Vallejo Eljuri	Chimborazo: Riobamba	Miss Universe 1958
1959	3 July 1959	Teatro Olmedo; Guayaquil, Guayas	Carlota Elena Ayala Arellano	Guayas: Guayaquil	Miss Universe 1959
1960	25 June 1960	Guayaquil Tennis Club; Guayaquil, Guayas	Isabel Matilde Rolando Ceballos	Pichincha: Quito	Miss Universe 1960
1961	29 June 1961	Teatro Olmedo; Guayaquil, Guayas	Elaine Nina Ortega Hougen	Pichincha: Quito	Miss International 1961
1961	29 June 1961	Teatro Olmedo; Guayaquil, Guayas	Elaine Nina Ortega Hougen	Pichincha: Quito	Miss Universe 1962
1961	29 June 1961	Teatro Olmedo; Guayaquil, Guayas	Elaine Nina Ortega Hougen	Pichincha: Quito	Miss World 1962
1962	5 August 1962	Club de Leones de Guayaquil; Guayaquil, Guayas	Margarita Leonor Arosemana Gómez	Guayas: Guayaquil	Miss International 1962: Top 15
1963	30 July 1963	Teatro 9 de Octubre; Guayaquil, Guayas	Tania Valle Moreno	Guayas: Guayaquil	Miss International 1963
1964	21 July 1964	Teatro 9 de Octubre; Guayaquil, Guayas	María Agustina Mendoza Vélez	Manabí: Santa Ana	Miss International 1964
1965	20 July 1965	Teatro 9 de Octubre; Guayaquil, Guayas	María Eugenia Mosquéra Bañados	Guayas: Guayaquil	Miss International 1965
1966: Appointed	3 August 1966	Salón de la Asociación de Periodistas; Guayaquil, Guayas	Alexandra Vallejo Klaere	Guayas: Guayaquil	Miss World 1966
1967: Appointed	10 October 1966	Canal 4 Studios; Guayaquil, Guayas	Laura Elena Baquero Palacios	Guayas: Guayaquil	Miss Universe 1967: Did not compete
1967: Appointed	10 October 1966	Canal 4 Studios; Guayaquil, Guayas	Laura Elena Baquero Palacios	Guayas: Guayaquil	Miss International 1967
1967: Appointed	10 October 1966	Canal 4 Studios; Guayaquil, Guayas	Laura Elena Baquero Palacios	Guayas: Guayaquil	Miss World 1967
1968	15 June 1968	Guayaquil Yacht Club; Guayaquil, Guayas	Priscilla Elena Álava González	Guayas: Guayaquil	Miss Universe 1968
1969	12 June 1969	Canal 2 Studios; Guayaquil, Guayas	Rosana Leonor Vinueza Estrada	Guayas: Guayaquil	Miss Universe 1969
1970	16 July 1970	Canal 2 Studios; Guayaquil, Guayas	Sofía Virginia Monteverde Nimbriotis	Guayas: Guayaquil	Miss World 1970: Top 15
1971	19 August 1971	Teatro 9 de Octubre; Guayaquil, Guayas	María Cecilia Gómez Buenaventura	Guayas: Guayaquil	Miss World 1971
1972	27 October 1972	Canal 2 Studios; Guayaquil, Guayas	Patricia Ximena Falconí Salas	Pichincha: Quito	Miss World 1972
1973: Appointed	3 May 1973	Canal 2 Studios; Guayaquil, Guayas	Ana Patricia Rivadeneira Peña	Azuay: Cuenca	Miss Maja 1973
1974	7 October 1974	Teatro 9 de Octubre; Guayaquil, Guayas	Silvia Aurora Jurado Estrada	Guayas: Playas	Miss World 1974
1975	4 July 1975	Teatro 9 de Octubre; Guayaquil, Guayas	Ana María Wray Salas	Guayas: Guayaquil	Miss Universe 1975
1976	1 June 1976	Canal 2 Studios; Guayaquil, Guayas	Gilda de las Mercedes Plaza Guerra	Guayas: Guayaquil	Miss Universe 1976
1977	17 June 1977	Coliseo Cerrado de Guayaquil; Guayaquil, Guayas	Lucía del Carmen Hernández Quiñonez	Manabí: Chone	Miss Universe 1977
1977	17 June 1977	Coliseo Cerrado de Guayaquil; Guayaquil, Guayas	Lucía del Carmen Hernández Quiñonez	Manabí: Chone	Miss World 1977
1978: Appointed	8 May 1977	Telecentro Studios; Guayaquil, Guayas	Mabel Adelaida Ceballos Sangster	Guayas: Guayaquil	Miss Universe 1978
1979: Appointed	9 June 1979	Telecentro Studios; Guayaquil, Guayas	Ana Beatriz Plaza Guerra	Guayas: Guayaquil	Miss Universe 1979
1980	11 June 1980	Teatro 9 de Octubre; Guayaquil, Guayas	Leslie Verónica Rivas Franco	El Oro: Machala	Miss Universe 1980
1981: Appointed	2 June 1981	Telecentro Studios; Guayaquil, Guayas	Lucía Isabel Vinueza Urgelles^{A}	Guayas: Guayaquil	Miss Universe 1981: Top 12
1981: Appointed	2 June 1981	Telecentro Studios; Guayaquil, Guayas	Lucía Isabel Vinueza Urgelles^{A}	Guayas: Guayaquil	Miss World 1981
1982: Appointed	4 June 1982	Telecentro Studios; Guayaquil, Guayas	Lorena Jacqueline Burgos García	Guayas: Guayaquil	Miss Universe 1982
1983	14 June 1983	Teatro 9 de Octubre; Guayaquil, Guayas	Mariela del Mar García Monsalve^{B}	Manabí: Portoviejo	Miss Universe 1983
1984	29 May 1984	Teatro 9 de Octubre; Guayaquil, Guayas	Leonor Patricia Gonzenbach Vallejo	Guayas: Guayaquil	Miss Universe 1984
1985	4 June 1985	Teatro 9 de Octubre; Guayaquil, Guayas	María Elena Stangl Tamayo	Guayas: Guayaquil	Miss Universe 1985
1986	27 May 1986	Teatro 9 de Octubre; Guayaquil, Guayas	Verónica Lucía Sevilla Ledergeber	Pichincha: Quito	Miss Universe 1986
1987	31 March 1987	Teatro 9 de Octubre; Guayaquil, Guayas	María del Pilar Barreiro Cucalón	Pichincha: Quito	Miss Universe 1987
1988: Appointed	1 April 1988	Telecentro Studios; Guayaquil, Guayas	Cecilia Cristina Pozo Carminer	Guayas: Guayaquil	Miss Universe 1988
1989	15 June 1988	Teatro Centro de Arte; Guayaquil, Guayas	María Eugenia Molina Astudillo	Guayas: Guayaquil	Miss Universe 1989
1990: Appointed	8 January 1990	Telecentro Studios; Guayaquil, Guayas	Jéssica del Carmen Núñez Severino	Guayas: Guayaquil	Miss Universe 1990
1991	12 March 1991	Teatro Centro de Arte; Guayaquil, Guayas	Diana Karina Neira Rassmussen	Guayas: Guayaquil	Miss Universe 1991
1992	9 April 1992	Teatro Centro de Arte; Guayaquil, Guayas	María Soledad Diab Aguilar	Guayas: Guayaquil	Miss Universe 1992
1993	22 April 1993	Teatro Nacional de la Cultura; Quito, Pichincha	Arianna Mandini Klein	Guayas: Guayaquil	Miss Universe 1993
1994	24 March 1994	Teatro Centro de Arte; Guayaquil, Guayas	Mafalda del Pilar Arboleda Arditto	Guayas: Guayaquil	Miss Universe 1994
1995: Appointed	1 March 1955	Ecuavisa Studios; Guayaquil, Guayas	Radmila Miryana Pandžić Arapov	Manabí: Manta	Miss Universe 1995
1996	9 November 1955	Teatro Bolívar; Quito, Pichincha	Mónica Paulina Chalá Mejía	Pichincha: Quito	Miss Universe 1996
1997	17 April 1997	Teatro Nacional de la Cultura; Quito, Pichincha	María José López Verdú	Pichincha: Quito	Miss Universe 1997
1998	21 March 1988	Teatro Nacional de la Cultura; Quito, Pichincha	Soraya Edith Hogonaga Serrano^{C}	Pichincha: Quito	Miss Universe 1998
1999	16 April 1999	Teatro Nacional de la Cultura; Quito, Pichincha	Carolina Alfonso De la Paz	Pichincha: Quito	Miss Universe 1999
2000	6 April 2000	Teatro Centro de Arte; Guayaquil, Guayas	Gabriela Mercedes Cadena Vedova	Guayas: Guayaquil	Miss Universe 2000
2001	21 March 2001	Teatro Nacional de la Cultura; Quito, Pichincha	Jéssica Eliana Bermudez Ronquillo	Guayas: Guayaquil	Miss Universe 2001
2002	26 March 2002	Teatro Centro de Arte; Guayaquil, Guayas	Isabel Cristina Ontaneda Pinto^{D}	Pichincha: Quito	Miss Universe 2002
2002	26 March 2002	Teatro Centro de Arte; Guayaquil, Guayas	Isabel Cristina Ontaneda Pinto^{D}	Pichincha: Quito	Miss International 2002
2002	26 March 2002	Teatro Centro de Arte; Guayaquil, Guayas	Isabel Cristina Ontaneda Pinto^{D}	Pichincha: Quito	Miss Earth 2003
2003	27 March 2003	Teatro Nacional de la Cultura; Quito, Pichincha	Andrea Marcela Jácome Ruíz	Guayas: Guayaquil	Miss Universe 2003
2004	4 March 2004	Teatro Centro de Arte; Guayaquil, Guayas	María Susana Rivadeneira Simbal	Pichincha: Quito	Miss Universe 2004: Top 10
2005	12 March 2005	Teatro Nacional de la Cultura; Quito, Pichincha	Laura Ximena Zamora Moreano	Pichincha: Quito	Miss Universe 2005
2006	16 March 2006	Coliseo Mayor de Cuenca; Cuenca, Azuay	Catalina "Katty" Mercedes López Samán	Guayas: Guayaquil	Miss Universe 2006
2007	22 March 2007	Coliseo Voltaire Paladines Polo; Guayaquil, Guayas	María Lugina Cabezas Andrade	Pichincha: Quito	Miss Universe 2007
2008	18 March 2008	Centro de Convenciones CEMEXPO; Quito, Pichincha	Doménica Francesca Saporiti Hinojosa	Guayas: Guayaquil	Miss Universe 2008
2009	13 March 2009	Coliseo Lorgio Pinargote; Manta, Manabí	Sandra María Vinces Pinargote	Manabí: Portoviejo	Miss Universe 2009
2010	25 March 2010	Centro de Convenciones CEMEXPO; Quito, Pichincha	Lady Fernanda Mina Lastra	Guayas: Guayaquil	Miss Universe 2010
2011	17 March 2011	Recinto Ferial Alfonso Torres Ordóñez; Santo Domingo, Santo Domingo	Claudia Elena Schiess Fretz^{E}	Galápagos: Puerto Ayora	Miss Universe 2011
2012	16 March 2012	Puerto Lucía Yacht Club; La Libertad, Santa Elena	Andrea Carolina Aguirre Pérez	Guayas: Guayaquil	Miss Universe 2012
2013	8 March 2013	Teatro Centro Cívico; Guayaquil, Guayas	Constanza María Báez Jalil	Pichincha: Quito	Miss Universe 2013: 2nd Runner-up
2014	15 March 2014	Teatro Centro Cívico; Guayaquil, Guayas	Silvia Alejandra Argudo Intriago	Manabí: Portoviejo	Miss Universe 2014
2015	4 March 2015	Centro de Convenciones de Guayaquil; Guayaquil, Guayas	Francesca Keyco Cipriani Burgos	Guayas: Guayaquil	Miss Universe 2015
2016	12 March 2016	Hotel Oro Verde; Machala, El Oro	Connie Maily Jiménez Romero	Los Ríos: Ventanas	Miss Universe 2016
2017	22 April 2017	Complejo Polideportivo El Chorrillo; Babahoyo, Los Ríos	María Daniela Cepeda Matamoros	Guayas: Guayaquil	Miss Universe 2017
2018	5 May 2018	Hotel Oro Verde; Machala, El Oro	Virginia Stephanie Limongi Silva	Manabí: Portoviejo	Miss Universe 2018
2019	19 July 2019	Teatro Centro de Arte; Guayaquil, Guayas	Cristina María Hidalgo Berry	Guayas: Guayaquil	Miss Universe 2019
2020	17 October 2020	Hotel Wyndham Sail; Manta, Manabí	Leyla Shuken Espinoza Calvache	Los Ríos: Quevedo	Miss Universe 2020
2021	11 September 2021	Malecón Eloy Alfaro; Quevedo, Los Ríos	Susana "Susy" Valeria Sacoto Mendoza	Manabí: Portoviejo	Miss Universe 2021
2022	3 September 2022	Malecon Eloy Alfaro; Quevedo, Los Rios	Nayelhi Alejandra González Ulloa	Esmeraldas: Esmeraldas	Miss Universe 2022
2023	1 July 2023	Recinto Ferial "Alfonso Torres Ordoñez"; Santo Domingo, Santo Domingo	Delary Georgette Stoffers Villón	Guayas: Guayaquil	Miss Universe 2023
2024	17 August 2024	Salinas Golf & Tennis Club; Salinas, Santa Elena	Eunice Alexandra Rivadeneira Bermeo	Guayas: Guayaquil	Miss International 2025
2025	16 August 2025	Salinas Golf & Tennis Club; Salinas, Santa Elena	Miriam Giselle Rosales Sánchez	El Oro: Machala	Miss International 2026
2026	29 August 2026	Malecon de Salinas; Salinas, Santa Elena	Ivanna Nicola Salazar	Guayas: Guayaquil	Miss International 2027

A.Lucía Vinueza was born in Cuenca, Azuay; but she represented the province of Guayas.
B.Mariela García was born in Cuenca, Azuay; but she represented the province of Manabí.
C.Soraya Hogonaga was born in Milagro, Guayas; but she represented the province of Pichincha.
D.Isabel Ontaneda was born in Cuenca, Azuay; but she represented the province of Pichincha.
E.Claudia Schiess was born in Basel, Switzerland; but she represented the province of Galápagos.

== Representatives to international beauty pageants ==
=== Miss Ecuador Internacional ===
- : Declared the Winner
- : Finished as a runner-up or top 5/6 qualification
- : Finished as one of the finalists or semifinalists
- : Finished as a special awards winner

Before 2013, the 2nd Runner-up used to compete at Miss International. Began 2013 the 1st Runner-up of Miss Ecuador represents her country at the Miss International pageant.

Year	Province	Hometown	Delegate	Placement	Special Award(s)
2027	Guayas	Guayaquil	Ivanna Nicola Salazar	TBD	
2026	El Oro	Machala	Miriam Giselle Rosales Sánchez	TBD	
2025	Guayas	Guayaquil	Eunices Rivadeneira Bermeo	Unplaced	
2024	Pichincha	Quito	Paulette Cajas Vela	Unplaced	
2023	Guayas	Guayaquil	Tatiana Georgette Kalil Roha	Unplaced	
2022	Guayas	Guayaquil	Valeria Gutiérrez Pinto	Unplaced	Miss Photogenic
Due to the impact of COVID-19 pandemic, no competition held between 2020—2021
2019	Pichincha	Quito	Alegría María Tobar Cordovés	Unplaced	
2018	Guayas	Guayaquil	Michelle Nathalie Huet Rodríguez	Top 8	Best National Costume
2017	Manabí	Manta	Jocelyn Daniela Mieles Zambrano	Top 8	
2016	El Oro	Machala	Ivanna Fiorella Abad Vásquez		Miss International Americas
2016	Guayas	Guayaquil	Bianka Yamel Fuentes Dieb	Resigned	
2015	Azuay	Cuenca	Daniela Armijos Cordero	Unplaced	
2014	Santa Elena	Salinas	Carla Daniela Prado Thoret	Unplaced	
2013	Guayas	Guayaquil	Nathaly Arroba Hurtado	Top 15	
2012	Santo Domingo	Santo Domingo	Tatiana Katherine Loor Hidalgo	Unplaced	
2011	Pichincha	Quito	María Fernanda Cornejo Alfaro	Miss International 2011	Miss Stature; Miss Beauty
2010	Loja	Loja	Andrea Ivonne Suárez Melgar	Unplaced	
2009	Pichincha	Quito	Isabella Chiriboga Valdivieso	Unplaced	
2008	Guayas	Guayaquil	Jennifer Stephannie Pazmiño Saldaña	Top 12	
2007	Esmeraldas	Esmeraldas	Jéssica Maena Ortiz Campos	Unplaced	
2006	Pichincha	Quito	Denisse Elizabeth Rodríguez Quiñónez	Unplaced	
2005	Guayas	Guayaquil	Bianca María Salame Avilés	Unplaced	
2004	Guayas	Guayaquil	Irene Andrea Zunino García	Unplaced	
2003	Did not compete				
2002	Pichincha	Quito	Isabel Cristina Ontaneda Pinto	Unplaced	
Did not compete between 1973—2001
1972	Manabí	Manta	Lucía del Carmen Fernández Avellaneda	Unplaced	Best National Costume
1971	Pichincha	Quito	Susana Castro Jaramillo	Unplaced	
1970	Pichincha	Quito	Lourdes Hernández	Top 15	
1969	Guayas	Guayaquil	Alexandra Swanberg Viteri	Unplaced	
1968	Guayas	Guayaquil	Enriqueta Valdéz Fuentes	Unplaced	
1967	Pichincha	Quito	Laura Elena Baquero Palacios	Unplaced	
1966	No contest				
1965	Guayas	Guayaquil	María Eugenia Mosquera Bañados	Unplaced	
1964	Manabí	Santa Ana	María Agustina Mendoza Vélez	Unplaced	
1963	Guayas	Guayaquil	Tania Valle Moreno	Unplaced	
1962	Guayas	Guayaquil	Margarita Arosemena Gómez	Top 15	
1961	Guayas	Guayaquil	Elaine Nina Ortega Hougen	Unplaced	
1960	Pichincha	Quito	Magdalena Dávila Varela	Unplaced	

== Past titleholders under Miss Ecuador org. ==
=== Miss Ecuador Universo ===
- : Declared as Winner
- : Ended as runner-up or top 5/6 qualification
- : Ended as one of the finalists or semifinalists
- : Ended as special awards winner

The winner of Miss Ecuador represents her country at the Miss Universe pageant. On occasion, when the winner does not qualify (due to age) for either contest, a runner-up is sent.

Year	Province	Hometown	Miss Ecuador	Placement at Miss Universe	Special Awards
2023	Guayas	Guayaquil	Delary Georgette Stoffers Villón	Unplaced
2022	Esmeraldas	Esmeraldas	Nayelhi Alejandra González Ulloa	Unplaced
2021	Manabí	Portoviejo	Susana Sacoto Mendoza	Unplaced
2020	Los Ríos	Quevedo	Leyla Shuken Espinoza Calvache	Unplaced
2019	Guayas	Guayaquil	Cristina María Hidalgo Berry	Unplaced
2018	Manabí	Portoviejo	Virginia Stephanie Limongi Silva	Unplaced
2017	Guayas	Guayaquil	María Daniela Cepeda Matamoros	Unplaced
2016	Los Ríos	Ventanas	Connie Maily Jiménez Romero	Unplaced
2015	Guayas	Guayaquil	Francesca Keyco Cipriani Burgos	Unplaced
2014	Manabí	Portoviejo	Silvia Alejandra Argudo Intriago	Unplaced
2013	Pichincha	Quito	Constanza María Báez Jalil	2nd Runner-up
2012	Guayas	Guayaquil	Carolina Andrea Aguirre Pérez	Unplaced
2011	Galápagos	Santa Cruz	Claudia Elena Schiess Fretz	Unplaced
2010	Guayas	Guayaquil	Lady Fernanda Mina Lastra	Unplaced
2009	Manabí	Portoviejo	María Sandra Vinces Pinargote	Unplaced	Best National Costume (3rd place)
2008	Guayas	Guayaquil	Doménica Francesca Saporitti Hinojosa	Unplaced
2007	Pichincha	Quito	María Lugina Cabezas Andrade	Unplaced
2006	Guayas	Guayaquil	Catalina Mercedes López Samán	Unplaced
2005	Pichincha	Quito	Laura Ximena Zamora Moreano	Unplaced
2004	Pichincha	Quito	María Susana Rivadeneira Simball	Top 10	Best National Costume (Top 10)
2003	Guayas	Guayaquil	Andrea Marcela Jácome Ruíz	Unplaced
2002	Pichincha	Quito	Isabel Cristina Ontaneda Pinto^{[^]}	Unplaced
2001	Guayas	Guayaquil	Jéssica Eliana Bermúdez Ronquillo	Unplaced
2000	Guayas	Guayaquil	Gabriela Mercedes Cadena Védova	Unplaced
1999	Pichincha	Quito	Carolina Alfonso De La Paz	Unplaced
1998	Pichincha	Quito	Soraya Edith Hogonaga Serrano^{[^^]}	Unplaced
1997	Pichincha	Quito	María José López Verdú	Unplaced
1996	Pichincha	Quito	Mónica Paulina Chalá Mejía	Unplaced
1995	Manabí	Manta	Radmila Padnizic Arapov	Unplaced
1994	Guayas	Guayaquil	Mafalda Arboleda Arditto	Unplaced
1993	Guayas	Guayaquil	Arianna Mandini Klein	Unplaced
1992	Guayas	Guayaquil	María Soledad Diab Aguilar	Unplaced	Miss Photogenic
1991	Guayas	Guayaquil	Diana Neira Rassmussen	Unplaced
1990	Guayas	Guayaquil	Jéssica Núñez Severino	Unplaced
1989	Guayas	Guayaquil	María Eugenia Molina Astudillo	Unplaced
1988	Guayas	Guayaquil	Cecilia Pozo Caminer	Unplaced
1987	Pichincha	Quito	María del Pilar Barreiro Cucalón	Unplaced
1986	Pichincha	Quito	Verónica Lucía Sevilla Ledergeber	Unplaced
1985	Guayas	Guayaquil	María Elena Stangl Tamayo	Unplaced
1984	Guayas	Guayas	Leonor Patricia Gonzembach Vallejo	Unplaced
1983	Manabí	Portoviejo	Mariela del Mar García Monsalve^{[^]}	Unplaced
1982	Guayas	Guayaquil	Lorena Jacqueline Burgos García	Unplaced
1981	Guayas	Guayaquil	Lucía Isabel Vinueza Urjelles^{[^]}	Top 12
1980	El Oro	Machala	Leslie Verónica Rivas Franco	Unplaced
1979	Guayas	Guayaquil	Ana Margarita Plaza Guerra	Unplaced
1978	Guayas	Guayaquil	Mabel Cevallos Sangster	Unplaced
1977	Manabí	Chone	Lucía del Carmen Hernández Quiñonez	Unplaced
1976	Guayas	Guayaquil	Gilda Plaza Guerra	Unplaced
1975	Guayas	Guayaquil	Ana María Wray Salas	Unplaced
Did not compete between 1973—1974
1972	Pichincha	Quito	Susana Castro Jaramillo	Unplaced
1971	Pichincha	Quito	Ximena Montenegro Ochoa	Unplaced
1970	Manabi	Portoviejo	Zoila Montesinos Rivera	Unplaced
1969	Guayas	Guayaquil	Rosana Vinueza	Unplaced
1968	Guayas	Guayaquil	Priscilla Alava González	Unplaced
1967	Did not compete
1966	Pichincha	Quito	Martha Cecilia Andrade Alomina	Unplaced
1965	Guayas	Guayaquil	Patricia Susana Ballesteros	Unplaced
1964	Guayas	Guayaquil	Tanya Yela Klein Loffredo	Unplaced
1963	Azuay	Cuenca	Patricia Córdova Martínez	Unplaced
1962	Guayas	Guayaquil	Elaine Nina Ortega Hougen	Unplaced
1961	Guayas	Guayaquil	Yolanda Palacios Charvert	Unplaced
1960	Pichincha	Quito	Isabel Matilde Rolando Ceballos	Unplaced
1959	Guayas	Guayaquil	Carlota Elena Ayala Arellano	Unplaced
1958	Chimborazo	Riobamba	Alicia Vallejo Eljuri	Unplaced
1957	Guayas	Guayaquil	Patricia Juliana Benítez Wright	Unplaced
1956	Guayas	Guayaquil	María Mercedes Flores Espín	Unplaced
1955	Guayas	Guayaquil	Leonor María Carcache Rodríguez	Unplaced

- ^{^} Lucía Vinueza (1981), Mariela García (1983) and Isabel Ontaneda (2002) were born in Cuenca, Azuay; but they represented their hometown's : Guayaquil, Portoviejo and Province of Pichincha respectively.

=== Miss Ecuador Mundo ===
- : Declared as Winner
- : Ended as runner-up or top 5/6 qualification
- : Ended as one of the finalists or semifinalists
- : Ended as special awards winner

Before 2013 Miss Ecuador org crowned Miss Mundo Ecuador where the winner represented Ecuador at Miss World. Since 2013 the Miss World Ecuador sends winners to Miss World. On occasion, when the winner does not qualify (due to age) for either contest, a runner-up is sent.

Year	Province	Hometown	Miss Ecuador Mundo	Placement at Miss World	Special Awards
2012	Esmeraldas	Esmeraldas	Cipriana Correia	Unplaced
2011	Guayas	Guayaquil	Verónica Vargas	Unplaced	Beauty with a Purpose (Top 30)
2010	Tungurahua	Ambato	Ana Galarza	Unplaced
2009	Esmeraldas	Esmeraldas	María Gabriela Ulloa Quiñones	Unplaced
2008	Guayas	Guayaquil	Marjorie Alexandra Cevallos Vera	Unplaced
2007	Guayas	Guayaquil	Valeska Saab	Top 16	Beauty with a Purpose
2006	Azuay	Cuenca	María Rebeca Flores Jaramillo	Unplaced
2005	Guayas	Guayaquil	Marielisa Márques Gutiérrez	Unplaced
2004	Guayas	Guayaquil	Cristina Eugenia Reyes Hidalgo	Unplaced	Beach Beauty (Top 10); Miss World Talent (Top 25)
2003	Esmeraldas	Esmeraldas	Mayra Katty Rentería Matamba	Unplaced
2002	Pichincha	Santo Domingo	Jéssica Leonela Angulo Miranda^{[^]}	Unplaced
2001	Pichincha	Quito	Carla Lorena Revelo Pérez	Unplaced
2000	Manabí	Portoviejo	Ana Dolores Murillo Sánchez	Unplaced
1999	Manabí	Manta	Sofía Morán Trueba	Unplaced
1998	Guayas	Guayaquil	Vanessa Natalia Graf Alvear	Unplaced
1997	Esmeraldas	Esmeraldas	Clío Olaya Frías	Unplaced
1996	Guayas	Guayaquil	Jennifer Lynn Graham Dumani	Unplaced
1995	Guayas	Guayaquil	Ana Fabiola Trujillo Parker	Unplaced
1994	Guayas	Guayaquil	Diana Margarita Noboa Gordon	Unplaced
1993	Guayas	Guayaquil	Danna Saab Saab	Unplaced
1992	Guayas	Guayaquil	Stephanie Krumholz De Menezes	Unplaced
1991	Guayas	Guayaquil	Suanny Denise Bejarano López	Unplaced
1990	Did not compete
1989	El Oro	Machala	Ximena Paulett Correa Jarre	Unplaced
1988	Guayas	Guayaquil	Cristina Elena López Villagómez	Unplaced
1987	Guayas	Guayaquil	Cecilia Pozo Caminer	Top 15
1986	Guayas	Guayaquil	Alicia Gisela Cucalón Macías	6th Runner-up
1985	Pichincha	Quito	María del Pilar De Veintemilla Russo	Unplaced
1984	Azuay	Azuay	María Sol Corral Zambrano	Unplaced
1983	Guayas	Guayaquil	Martha Lascano Salcedo	Unplaced
1982	Guayas	Guayaquil	Gianna Machiavello González	Unplaced
1981	Guayas	Guayaquil	Lucía Isabel Vinueza Urjelles	Unplaced
1980	Guayas	Guayaquil	Gabriela María Catelina Ríos Roca	Unplaced
1979	Guayas	Guayaquil	Olba Lourdes Padilla Guevara	Unplaced
1978	Guayas	Guayaquil	Antonieta Cecilia Campodónico Aguirre	Unplaced
1977	Manabí	Chone	Lucía del Carmen Hernández Quiñonez	Unplaced
1976	Guayas	Guayaquil	Marie Clare Fontaine Velasco	Unplaced
1975	Did not compete
1974	Guayas	Playas	Silvia Aurora Jurado Estrada	Unplaced
1973	Did not compete
1972	Pichincha	Quito	Patricia Falconí Salas	Unplaced
1971	Guayas	Guayaquil	María Cecilia Gómez Buenaventura	Unplaced
1970	Guayas	Guayaquil	Sofía Virginia Monteverde Nimbriotis	Top 15
1969	Pichincha	Quito	Ximena Aulestia	Unplaced
1968	Guayas	Guayaquil	Marcia Virginia Ramos Christiansen	Unplaced
1967	Guayas	Guayaquil	Laura Elena Baquero Palacios	Unplaced
1966	Guayas	Guayaquil	Alexandra Vallejo Klaere	Unplaced
1965	Pichincha	Quito	Corine Mildred Corral	Unplaced
1964	Guayas	Guayaquil	María de Lourdes Anda Vallejo	Unplaced
1963	Did not compete
1962	Guayas	Guayaquil	Elaine Ortega Hougen	Unplaced
1961	Pichincha	Quito	Magdalena Dávila González	Unplaced
1960	Guayas	Guayaquil	Toty Rodríguez	Unplaced

== See also ==
- Miss Earth Ecuador
- Miss Teen Ecuador
- Miss Universe Ecuador 1970
- Mister Ecuador
