= Raúl Ilaquiche =

Ecuadorian politician (1973–2024)

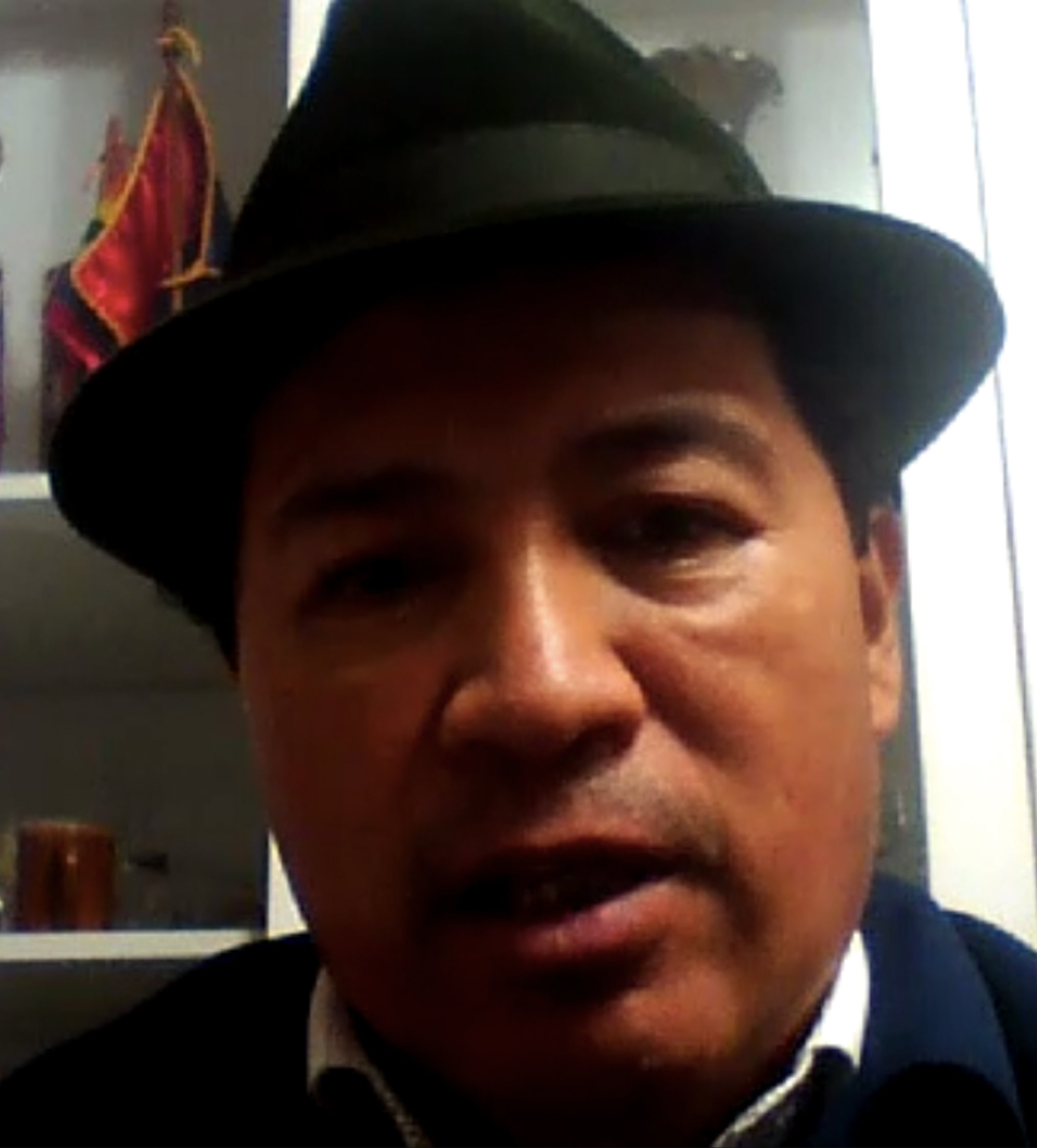
- Ilaquiche in 2022

Member of the National Congress of Ecuador for Cotopaxi Province
- In office 15 January 2007 – 29 November 2007

Personal details
- Born: Raúl Clemente Ilaquiche Licta; 8 January 1973 Pujilí Canton, Ecuador
- Died: 13 December 2024 (aged 51) Mejía Canton, Ecuador
- Party: MUPP
- Spouse: Lourdes Tibán
- Education: Central University of Ecuador; Latin American Faculty of Social Sciences; Universidad Regional Autónoma de los Andes
- Occupation: Lawyer

Raúl Clemente Ilaquiche Licta (8 January 1973 – 13 December 2024) was an Ecuadorian lawyer and politician. A member of the Pachakutik Plurinational Unity Movement – New Country, he served in the National Congress from January to November 2007.

He was married to former member of the National Assembly Lourdes Tibán since 2008.

Ilaquiche died in a traffic collision in Mejía Canton, on 13 December 2024, at the age of 51.
