= Chugchilán =

Coordinates: 0°48′S 78°55′W

- City
- Chugchilán
- Interactive map of Chugchilán
- Country: Ecuador
- Province: Cotopaxi Province
- Elevation: 3,200 m (10,500 ft)

Population (2006)
  - Total: 6,350
- (approximate population)
- Time zone: UTC-5 (ECT)

Chugchilán is a town in Sigchos Canton, Cotopaxi Province, Ecuador. It has a population of 6,350.
