= Media Lengua =

Mixed Kichwa–Spanish language of Ecuador

- Quichuañol
- Chaupi-shimi/ Media Lengua
- Native to: Ecuador
- Region: Imbabura; Cotopaxi
- Ethnicity: Cayambe (Imbabura Media Lengua)
- Native speakers: ~2,600 (2005, 2011)
- Language family: mixed Kichwa–Spanish

Language codes
- ISO 639-3: mue (Salcedo Media Lengua)
- Glottolog: medi1245

This audio clip is a brief sample of the Media Lengua language spoken in Pijal, Imbabura, Ecuador. The recording was produced during an elicitation session where the speaker was asked for an oral translation of Spanish sentences. The audio clip contains subtitles in English, Kichwa, Spanish, French, Italian and Portuguese. Media Lengua is also available, but Wiki subtitles currently has no language code for this language.

Media Lengua, also known as Chaupi-shimi Chaupi-lengua, Chaupi-Quichua, Quichuañol, Chapu-shimi or llanga-shimi, (Note: Llanga-shimi is typically a derogatory term used by Kichwa-speakers to describe their language. However, it also appears to describe Media Lengua in the Imbabura Communities. It is believed that the term was introduced by Mestizo schoolteachers to discredit the indigenous populations) (roughly translated to "half language" or "in-between language") is a mixed language with Spanish vocabulary and Kichwa grammar, most conspicuously in its morphology. In terms of vocabulary, almost all lexemes (89%), including core vocabulary, are of Spanish origin and appear to conform to Kichwa phonotactics. Media Lengua is one of the few widely acknowledged examples of a "bilingual mixed language" in both the conventional and narrow linguistic sense because of its split between roots and suffixes. Such extreme and systematic borrowing is only rarely attested, and Media Lengua is not typically described as a variety of either Kichwa or Spanish. Arends et al., list two languages subsumed under the name Media Lengua: Salcedo Media Lengua and Media Lengua of Saraguro. The northern variety of Media Lengua, found in the province of Imbabura, is commonly referred to as Imbabura Media Lengua and more specifically, the dialect varieties within the province are known as Pijal Media Lengua and Angla Media Lengua.

== Geographical distribution ==
Media Lengua was first documented in Salcedo, Cotopaxi about 100 km south of Quito, Ecuador, by Dutch linguist Pieter Muysken during fieldwork on Ecuadorian Kichwa. During Muysken's surveys of the language, he also described other highly relexified varieties of Kichwa, including Amazonian Pidgin, Kichwa-Spanish interlanguage, Saraguro Media Lengua, and Catalangu. A 2011 investigation of Salcedo Media Lengua, however, suggests that the language is no longer spoken by the locals in and around Salcedo Canton. Little is known about the current status of the other relexified varieties of Kichwa described by Muysken. Several investigations from 2005, 2008, and 2011, however, show that a variety of Media Lengua is currently being spoken in the northern province of Imbabura. The investigations estimate that Imbabura Media Lengua is spoken by 2,600 people, 600 in the community of Pijal aged 35 and roughly 2,000 in and around the community of Angla, typically 25–45 years of age, making Media Lengua an endangered language and moribund in Pijal. The variety of Media Lengua that is spoken in Pijal appears to have emerged at the beginning of the 20th century and had its first generation of native speakers in the 1910s. Pijal Media Lengua then spread to the nearby community of Angla in the 1950s and the 1960s through intercommunity marriages and commerce. The current status of Media Lengua in Angla appears to be slightly healthier than in Pijal with the Angla variety having been passed on, to an extent, to the 2008 generation of schoolaged children.

== Origin theories ==
The development trajectory of Media Lengua is unclear. Several theories exist concerning the origins of Media Lengua. According to Muysken, Salcedo Media Lengua emerged through ethnic self-identification for indigenous populations, who no longer identified with either the rural Kichwa or the urban Spanish cultures. Lipski also claims that ethnic factors contributed to the origins of Salcedo Media Lengua but argues that the same can not be said for Imbabura Media Lengua. Instead, some speakers of Imbabura Media Lengua continue to self-identify as Kayambis, a pre-Inca ethnic group.

Gómez-Rendón claims Angla Media Lengua arose through prolonged contact between the Kichwa-speaking indigenous populations with the Mestizo Spanish speaking populations. Gómez-Rendón suggests that when Angla men returned from working outside of their community, there was a shift to Kichwa-Spanish bilingualism in households, leading to the development of Angla Media Lengua.

Dikker believes Media Lengua was created by men who left their native communities to work in urban Spanish-speaking areas. When the men returned to the communities, they had acquired a fluent level of Spanish and had been using Kichwa infrequently. Media Lengua then served as a link between the older monolingual Kichwa-speaking generation and younger monolingual Spanish-speaking generations.

Finally, Jesse Stewart claims that Media Lengua was either brought to Pijal from Salcedo or vice versa. He bases these claims on the "striking resemblance" between the Pijal and Salcedo varieties at both the phonological and the morphological level. The claim also includes testimonies of a large migration from Cotopaxi to Pijal at the beginning of the 20th century, which can be seen in the many Cotopaxi surnames in community.

Most researchers agree, however, that Media Lengua developed linguistically through various processes of lexification (relexification, adlexification and translexification) in a relatively short period of time.

== Vitality ==
In 2018, Lipski visited the communities where Media Lengua was first documented. He reports that Media Lengua is no longer spoken by the community members. Since the language was first documented in the 1970s, there has been a shift to Spanish as the dominant language of the community. In the Province of Imbabura, reports reflect that Media Lengua is still spoken in the communities of Pijal, Angla, and Casco Valenzuela. However, the sociolinguistic aspects of Media Lengua differ between these communities. In Pijal, speakers of Media Lengua are typically aged 35 and above, those aged 20–35 typically have a passive knowledge of the language, and speakers aged 20 and younger are often monolingual in Spanish. In the more urban communities of Angla and Casco-Valenzuela, this is not the case. Media Lengua is preferred and spoken on a daily basis among a wider age range of individuals. There are also cases of children acquiring Media Lengua from their parents and grandparents, which is not the case in Pijal. Lipski reports that Media Lengua is even being used by school aged children who attend a Kichwa-Spanish bilingual school in Topo. Estimates of the number of speakers vary widely. In Pijal, there is an estimate of around 600 speakers while in the communities of Angla, Uscha, Casco-Valenzuela, and El Topo, there may be as many 2000+ speakers.

== Phonology ==
=== Consonants ===
Words of Spanish origin often appear to conform to Kichwa phonotactics. However, voiced obstruents, which exist phonologically only as stops in a post-sonorant environment in Kichwa, appear phonemically as minimal pairs or near minimal pairs in Media Lengua through Spanish borrowings:

==== Kichwa [-sonorant] → [+voice]/[+sonorant]___ ====
Voiced Obstruents Borrowed from Spanish
Voiced	Voiceless
/batea/ batea "recipient"	/patea/ patea "kick"
/dos/ dos "two"	/tos/ tos "cough"
/gasa/ gaza "gauze"	/kasa/ casa "house"

Another phonological difference between Media Lengua and Kichwa is that Media Lengua often does not take into account the voicing rule.

Kichwa Voicing Rule Elimination
Kichwa	Media Lengua
Voiced	Voiceless
/ɲukaɡa/ ñuka-ka "I-TOP"	/joka/ (Note: Unlike Imbabura Media Lengua, Salcedo Media Lengua preserves the Kichwa voicing rule in the topic marker -ka) yo-ka "I-TOP"
/kanda/ kanta "you-ACC"	/asadonta/ asadon-ta "hoe-ACC"
/manuelba/ Manuel-pak "Manuel-POSS"	/manuelpa/ Manuel-pak "Manuel-POSS

However, in certain instances, especially regarding verbal inflections, the Kichwa voicing rule is preserved.

Voicing Rule Preservation
Kichwa	Media Lengua
Voiced	Voiced
/tʃaɾinɡi/ chari-nki "have-2S.PRES"	/tininɡi/ tiningui "have-2S.PRES"
/kilkanɡapa/ killka-nkapak "write-SS.SBJV"	/eskɾibinɡapa/ escribi-ngapa "SS.SBJV"

==== Other Spanish borrowings ====
- Labial [+/-continuant] contrast (/f/ vs. /p/)

(1) /fueɾʃte/ fuerte "strong" vs. /pueɾʃta/ puerta "door"

==== Kichwa influences ====
- Spanish intervocalic /s/ becomes /z/ in Media Lengua.

(2) Spanish /kasa/ casa "house" becomes Media Lengua /kaza/ casa "house"

- Spanish /r/ becomes Media Lengua /ʐ/.

(3) Spanish /karo/ carro "car" becomes /kaʐo/.

- Spanish /ʎ/ becomes Media Lengua /ʒ/.

(4) Spanish /poʎo/ pollo "chicken" becomes /poʒo/.

==== Archaic Spanish preservation of /x/ ====
A number of lexical items in both the Salcedo and Imbabura varieties maintain Spanish preservations from the Colonial period; most notably word-initial /x/.

Salcedo Media Lengua	Imbabura Media Lengua	Modern Ecuadorian Spanish	Colonial Era Spanish
[xabas]	[xabas]	[abas]	*[xabas]
[xondo]	[xondo]	[ondo]	*[xondo]
[xazienda]	[azinda]	[asienda]	*[xasienda]

(*)=reconstruction

IPA Chart (Imbabura Media Lengua) Affricates are presented under the place of final articulation.

	Bilabial	Labiodental	Alveolar	Postalveolar	Retroflex	Palatal	Velar
Nasal	m		n			ɲ	
Stop	p b		t d	tʃ			k ɡ
Fricative	ɸ		s	ʃ ʒ	ʐ		x
Approximant						j	w
Lateral			l				
Tap			ɾ				

=== Vowels ===
There are several competing views regarding the number and types of vowels in Media Lengua. One theory suggests Salcedo Media Lengua, like Kichwa, maintains three vowels [i], [u] and [a], with the occasional Spanish preservation of [e] and [o] in names, interjections and in stressed positions. Under that theory, all other Spanish borrowings assimilate to the Kichwa system. Another theory suggests that Imbabura Media Lengua passes through a three-step process of assimilation and words can maintain Spanish phonotactics [kabeza] cabeza 'head', undergo partial assimilation [kabisa] cabeza or (3) undergo complete assimilation [kabiza] cabeza. This theory also suggests that high-frequency words also tend to undergo complete assimilation, but low-frequency do not. Finally, acoustic evidence supports the claim that Media Lengua could be dealing with as many as eight vowels: Spanish-derived [i, a, u], which exist as extreme mergers with Kichwa-derived [i, a, u], and Spanish-derived [e] and [o], which exist as partial mergers with Kichwa [i] and [u], respectively.

Spanish diphthongs also exist with various degrees of assimilation in both Media Lengua dialects. The diphthong /ue/ is sometimes pronounced as /u/, /wi/ or /i/; Spanish /ui/ is pronounced /u/; Spanish /ie/ is pronounced as /i/; and Spanish /ai/, is maintained from Kichwa.

Salcedo Media Lengua
	Front	Central	Back
Close	i		u
Open		a	

Imbabura Media Lengua - Theory 1
	Front	Central	Back
Close	i		u
Mid	e		o
Open		a	
Spanish-derived vowels appear in green. Kichwa-derived vowels appear in blue.

Imbabura Media Lengua - Theory 2
	Front	Central	Back
Close	i i		u u
High Mid	e		o
Open		a a	
Spanish-derived vowels appear in green. Kichwa-derivedKichwa-derived vowels appear in blue.

There is also evidence of sonorant devoicing between voiceless obstruents, which affects the realization of pitch accents that fall on devoiced syllables (see the following section).

[+sonorant]→[-voice]/[-sonorant] ___ [-sonorant]
[-voice] [-voice]

(1) Vosteka tuyu casapika.
[bos.te.ka tu.ju ka.za.pika]→[bos.te̥.ka tu.ju ka.za.pi̥ka]
"[What do] you [have planted] at your house?"

=== Prosody ===
According to Muysken (1997), like Kichwa, stress is penultimate in Media Lengua. Stewart (2015), referring to stress as pitch accent (PA), provides a similar analysis pointing towards the realization of a low-high pitch accent (L+H*) taking place at the prosodic word level on, leading up to, or just after the penultimate syllable of a word. In the majority of a cases, an L+H* pitch accent on the penultimate syllable describes word level prosody (see example 1).

(1) L+H* L+H* L+H* L%
Papasuka wawakunawanmi colerahurka.
"Father was angry with the children."

In certain cases, however, a simple high (H*) may appear when the PA follows the penultimate syllable of a disyllabic word or when a voiceless onset appears in the penultimate syllable (see example 2). In both cases, Stewart (2015) suggests that is caused since there is no material to bear the preaccental rise, which would otherwise be realized as a typical L+H* PA.

(2)H* L+H* L%
Bela quemajun.
"The candle is burning."

Media Lengua also appears to mark emphasis at the prosodic word level with a substantial increase in pitch frequency on one or more words in an utterance (L+^H*) (see example 3). Pitch accents may also appear in a stair step-like pattern in utterances containing reduplication where the low (L) on the second instance of the reduplicated pair is often undershot. In the first instance of the reduplicated pair, a standard L+H* appears while in the second instances an emphatic L+^H% PA takes place where the L may be undershot (see example 4).

(3) L+H* L+^H* L+H* L+^H* L+H* L+H* L+^H* L%
Y alotro diaka vuelta otro bastanteta llevashpa, escondidito mio mamamanta llevashpa inkarkachi.
"And on the following day, we would go bringing another bunch [of beans] hidden from my mom."

(4) L+H* L+H* L+^H* L+H* L- H* H* H%
Diaymanta wachu wachu buscashka dezin uno cañata.
"So, they say she looked all over the plot of land, for a stick that is."

Stewart (2015) also describes instances of intermediate boundaries appearing as a single low tone (L-). These are often observed in standard content questions (wh-questions) following the utterance-initial question constituent or in some cases after words containing an emphatic PA (see example 5). There is also evidence of intermediate boundary tones in the form of pitch restart which take place in listing intonation just before the listing of items begins.

(5) L+H* L- L%
Quienpatak ese pelota?
"Whose ball is that?"

The intonational phrase in Media Lengua (the highest level unit within the autosegmental-metrical framework) is marked by a low boundary tone (L%) at the end of nearly every utterance (see examples 1, 2, 3, and 5). An exception to the configuration can be found in what Stewart (2015) refers to as clarifying utterances, which are marked with a high boundary tone (H%) (see example 4). Clarifying utterances in Media Lengua are used in three typical scenarios: (1) to clarify that a topic within a conversation is shared by those speaking, (2) to provide information which was accidentally left out of the main clause, and (3) provide the listener with additional information.

== Morphology ==
Media Lengua, like Kichwa, is a highly agglutinative language. Its normal sentence order is SOV (subject–object–verb). There are a large number of suffix changes both in the overall significance of words and their meanings. Of the 63 particles in Kichwa, Imbabura Media Lengua makes use of 49; an estimated 80% of the original Kichwa morphemes. The derivation and infectional particles appear to be in complete functioning order in the same way they are found in Ecuadorian Kichwa.

y mientras trabaja-shpa-ndu primer año estudia-rka-ni
and while work-GER-GER first year study-PRET-1S
"And while I worked the first year, I studied."

Media Lengua Particles (Note: The literature shows a wide range of variation regarding the functions of the particles in this table. Unless otherwise referenced, this list is based on Gómez-Rendón 2008.)
Suffix	Function
Objects	
-wa	1s.OBJ
-ri	3s.IDO
Temporal Aspects	
-na	Durative/ Infinitive
-gri	Ingressive
-shka	Past Participle
-shpa	Same Subject Gerund
-kpi	Different Subject Subordinator
-k	Habitual/ Agent
-i	Nominal/ Verbal infinitive
Auxiliaries	
-n	Euphonic
Atemporal Aspects	
-ri	Reflexive
Casuals	
-shina	Comparative
-kama	Terminative
-man	Allative/ Dative
-manta	Ablative/ Causal
-ta	Accusative/ Adverbial/ Prolative
-pak	Benefactive/ Genitive
-pi	Locative
-wan	Instrumental/ Comitative
Conjunctives	
-ndi(n)	Inclusive/ Comitative
-pura	Conjunctive
-pish/-pash	Additive
-tak	Contrastive
Derived Qualitatives	
-pacha	Superlative
Derived Quantitives	
-sapa	Augmentative
-siki	Exceditive? /Pejorative/Exaggeration
-pish/-pash	Additive
Derived Radicals	
-mu	Cislocative
-ku	Reflexive/ Progressive
-ri	Reflexive
-chi	Causative
-naku	Reciprocal
-pura	Conjunctive
-gri	Ingressive
-ngakaman	Terminative Verb Marker
-ngapa(k)	Propositive/ Benefactive
Evidential Clitics	
-ka	Topic
-mi/-ma	Focus/ Validator
Specific Clitics	
-lla	Limitative
-ra(k)	Continuative
Modals	
-man	Conditional
-na	FUT Obligative
Operators	
-chu	Interrogative
-chu	Negation
Personal Verb Markers	
-ni	1s.PRES
-ngi	2s.PRES
-n	3s.PRES
-nchi(k)	1p.PRES
-ngichi(k)	2p.PRES
-n(kuna)	3p.PRES
Personal Temporal Verb Markers	
-sha	1s.FUT
-shun	1p.FUT
-ngi	2s.FUT
-ngichi(k)	2p.FUT
-nga	3s.FUT
-n(kuna)	3s.FUT
-i	2s.imperative
-ichi(k)	2p.imperative
-shun	Exclusive Exhortative
-shunchik	Inclusive Exhortative
Pluralizer	
-kuna	Plural
Possessives	
-pa(k)	Alienable Possessive
-yuk	Inalienable Possessive
Pragmatic Evidentials	
-chari	Dubitative
-shi	Supposition
-karin	Exceditive Affirmation
-mari	Confirmative Affirmation
Temporal	
-k	Habitual Preterite
-rka	Simple Preterite
-shka	Perfective/ Past Participle

== Writing ==
Jilana in Media Lengua, Spanish, and English:

Media Lengua	Spanish	English
Jilana	Hilando	Spinning Wool
Jilashpa borregota treskilashpa lavankarkanchi lavashpa tisashpa. Vuelta unomi cardashpa unomi palogopi amarrashpa jilashpa andankarkanchi centuraspi metishpa. Asi ponchota azingapa kosaman, anacota azingapa suedraman, ponchota azingapa suedroman, anacota nuestroman asi jilay jilay andankarkanchi. Diaymanta, jilay jilay shayajushpapi vuelta camizata cozinkarkanchi manopi. Manopi cozishpa ponikushpa vivinchi ahorakaman. Asi manopi cozinchi ondipi mingakunapi sesionkunapi sentakushpa cozinajunchi camizata. Ahoraka jilaytaka ya no jilanchichu. Camizata mas cozinchi ahoraka, camizata mas que dinochekuna cozishpa sentanajunchi, mingaykunaman ishpa.	Para hilar lana comenzamos trasquilando una oveja, sigue el lavado y luego se tisa la lana, se envuelve muy firme en un palo que se lo pone en nuestra cintura, entonces podemos seguir hilando alrededor. Con esta lana hacíamos un poncho para nuestro esposo y para nuestro suegro y un anaco para la suegra. Después, cansadas de hilar, también bordábamos como hoy en día las camisas a mano. Por lo general se borda una camisa en cualquier lugar, por ejemplo: durante las mingas o en las reuniones. Hoy en día ya no hilamos a mano las camisas, estas vienen bordadas.	To spin wool, we begin by shearing the sheep, washing the wool and removing the pulling. We then make taut the wool by wrapping it around a stick that we keep in the sash around our waist. This way we can go about spinning, for example, a poncho for our husbands, an anaco for our mothers-in-law or a poncho for our fathers-in-law. After we get tired of spinning, we might switch to a shirt and sew by hand. Even today it's still common to sew by hand. We will sew basically anywhere. Often, during mingas or meetings, we will sit and work on a shirt.

== Bibliography ==
- Backus Ad. 2003. Can a mixed language be conventionalised alternational codeswitching? in Matras & Bakker (eds) The Mixed Language Debate: theoretical and empirical advances Mouton de Gruyter Berlin: 237-/270.
- Dikker, S. (2008). Spanish prepositions in Media Lengua: Redefining relexification. Hispanisation: the impact of Spanish on the lexicon and grammar of the indigenous languages of Austronesia and the Americas (pp. 121–146). Berlin: Mouton de Gruyter.
- Gómez-Rendón, J. (2005). La Media Lengua de Imbabura. ncuentros conflictos biling ismo contacto de lenguas en el mundo andino (pp. 39–58). Madrid: Iberoamericana.
- Gómez-Rendón, J. A. (2008). Mestizaje lingüístico en los Andes: génesis y estructura de una lengua mixta (1era. ed.). Quito, Ecuador: Abya-Yala.
- Jarrín, G. (2014). Estereotipos Lingüísticos en Relación al Kichwa y a la Media Lengua en las Comunidades de Angla, Casco Valenzuela, El Topo y Ucsha de la Parroquia San Pablo del Lago. (Licenciatura), Pontificia Universidad Católica Del Ecuador, Quito.
- Muysken, P. (1981). Halfway between Quechua and Spanish: The case for relexification. Historicity and variation in Creole studies (pp. 57–78). Ann Arbor: Karoma Publishers.
- Muysken, Pieter (1997). "Media Lengua", in Thomason, Sarah G. Contact languages: a wider perspective Amsterdam: John Benjamins (pp. 365–426)
- Pallares, A. (2002). From peasant struggles to Indian resistance: the Ecuadorian Andes in the late twentieth century. Norman: University of Oklahoma Press.
- McConvell, P. and Meakins, F. (2005). Gurindji Kriol: A Mixed Language Emerges from Code-switching. Quatro Fonologias Quechuas, 25(1), 9-30.
- Shappeck, Marco (2011). Quichua–Spanish language contact in Salcedo, Ecuador: Revisiting Media Lengua syncretic language practices (dissertation)
- Stewart, Jesse (2011). A brief descriptive grammar of Pijal Media Lengua and an acoustic vowel space analysis of Pijal Media Lengua and Imbabura Quichua (Thesis). University of Manitoba.
- Stewart, J. (2013). Stories and Traditions from Pijal: Told in Media Lengua. North Charleston: CreateSpace
- Stewart, J. (2014). A comparative analysis of Media Lengua and Quichua vowel production. Phonetica 7(3):159-182 doi:10.1159/000369629
- Stewart, J. (2015). Intonation patterns in Pijal Media Lengua. Journal of language contact 8(2):223-262. doi:10.1163/19552629-00802003
- Stewart, J. (2015). Production and Perception of Stop Consonants in Spanish, Quichua, and Media Lengua. PhD Dissertation, Winnipeg: University of Manitoba, DSpace.
- Stewart, J. (2018). Voice Onset Time Production in Spanish, Quichua, and Media Lengua. Journal of the International Phonetic Association 48(2):173–97. doi: doi.org/10.1017/S002510031700024X.
- Stewart, J. (2018). Vowel Perception by Native Media Lengua, Quichua, and Spanish Speakers. Journal of Phonetics 71:177–93. doi: https://doi.org/10.1016/j.wocn.2018.08.005.
- Stewart, Jesse. (2020). A Preliminary, Descriptive Survey of Rhotic and Approximant Fricativization in Northern Ecuadorian Andean Spanish Varieties, Quichua, and Media Lengua’. in Spanish Phonetics and Phonology in Contact: Studies from Africa, the Americas, and Spain, Issues in Hispanic and Lusophone Linguistics series, edited by R. Rao. Amsterdam & Philadelphia: John Benjamins.
- Stewart, J., G. Prado Ayala & L. Gonza Inlago. (2020). Media Lengua Dictionary. Dictionaria 12: 1-3216. doi:10.5281/zenodo.4147099
- Thomason, S. G., & Kaufman, T. (1988). Language contact, creolization, and genetic linguistics. Berkeley: University of California Press.

=== External links ===
- Media Lengua Dictionary
- Georg Bossong on mixed languages, including Media Lengua (in German)
- Article by Pieter Muysken on Root/Affix asymmetries in contact transfer including Media Lengua
- Marco Shappeck's PhD dissertation on Quichua-Spanish contact in Salcedo
- Jesse Stewart's MA thesis describing Imbabura Media Lengua and an acoustic analysis of vowel production in Quichua and Media Lengua
- A comparative analysis of Media Lengua and Quichua vowel production by Jesse Stewart
- Stories and Tradictions from Pijal: Told in Media Lengua by Jesse Stewart
- LA MEZCLA DE QUECHUA Y CASTELLANO El caso de la "media lengua" en el Ecuador by Pieter Muysken (in Spanish)
- Estereotipos Lingüísticos en Relación al Kichwa y a la Media Lengua en las Comunidades de Angla, Casco Valenzuela, El Topo y Ucsha de la Parroquia San Pablo del Lago by Gabriela Jarrín (in Spanish)
- La Media Lengua de Imbabura by Jorge Gómez-Rendón (in Spanish)
- Intonational patterns in Pijal Media Lengua by Jesse Stewart
