= Quilotoa =

Westernmost volcano in the Ecuadorian Andes

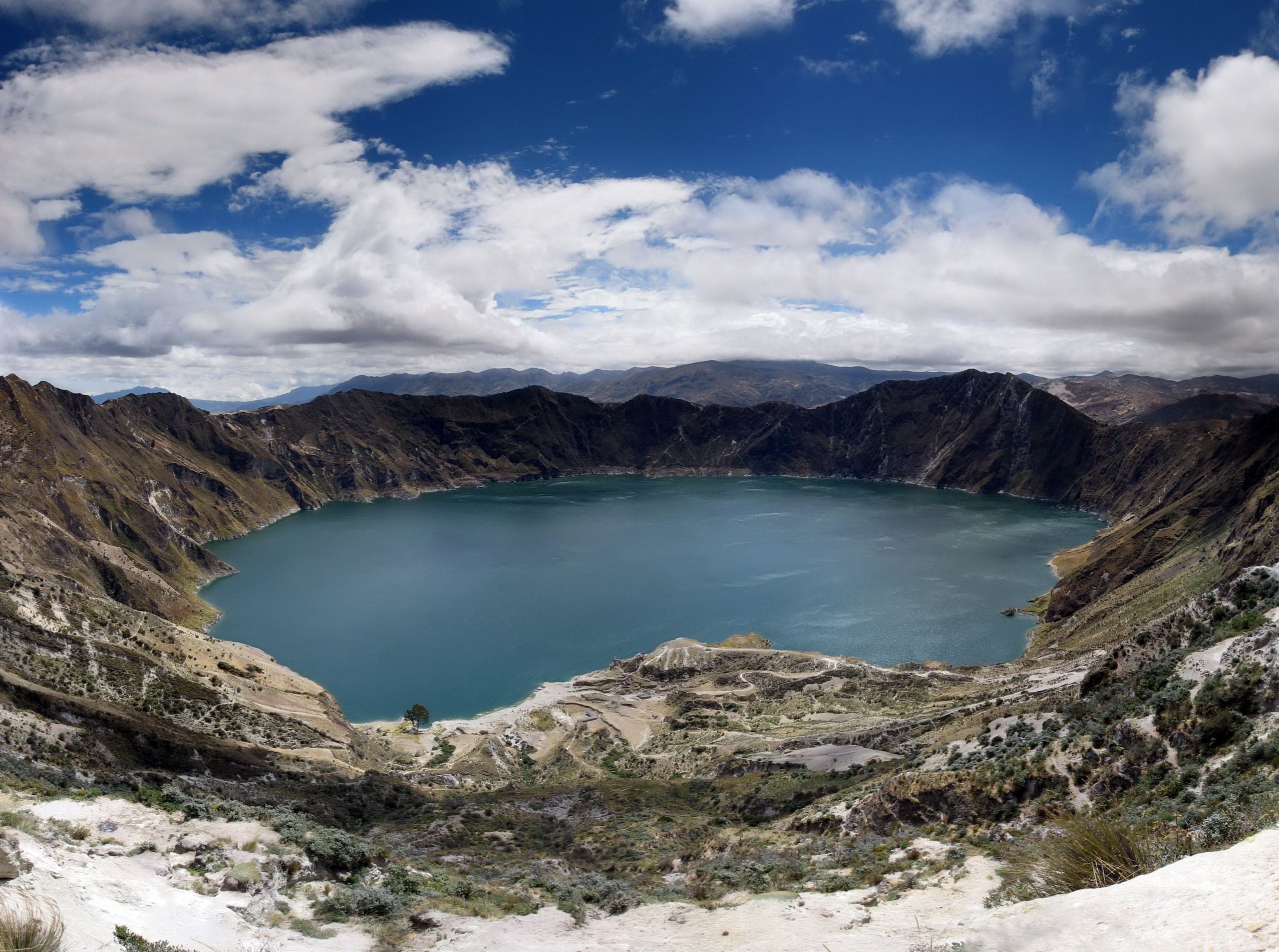
- Panorama of the lake-filled Quilotoa caldera.

Highest point
- Elevation: 3,914 m (12,841 ft)
- Prominence: 486 m (1,594 ft)
- Listing: List of volcanoes in Ecuador
- Coordinates: 0°51′S 78°54′W

Geography
- Location: Pujilí Canton, Cotopaxi Province, Ecuador
- Parent range: Andes

Geology
- Rock age: approx. 40,000 years
- Mountain type: Caldera
- Last eruption: 1280

Major volcanoes in Ecuador

Quilotoa (Spanish pronunciation: [kiloˈto.a]) is a water-filled crater lake and the most western volcano in the Ecuadorian Andes. The 3-kilometre-wide (2 mi) caldera was formed by the collapse of this dacite volcano following a catastrophic VEI-6 eruption about 800 years ago, which produced pyroclastic flows and lahars that reached the Pacific Ocean, and spread an airborne deposit of volcanic ash throughout the northern Andes. This last eruption followed a dormancy period of 14,000 years and is known as the 1280 Plinian eruption. The fourth (of seven) eruptive phase was phreatomagmatic, indicating that a crater lake was already present at that time. The caldera has since accumulated a 250-metre-deep (820 ft) crater lake, which has a greenish color as a result of dissolved minerals. Fumaroles are found on the lake floor, and hot springs occur on the eastern flank of the volcano.

Quilotoa is a site of growing popularity. The route to the "summit" (the small town of Quilotoa) is generally traveled by hired truck or bus from the town of Zumbahua 17 kilometres (11 mi) to the South, or more commonly by bus from Latacunga. Visitors have to pay two US dollars each to enter Quilotoa. There are a number of simple hostels in the immediate area offering services such as mules and guides. Activities include a four- to five-hour hike around the caldera. The caldera rim is highly irregular and reaches its maximum elevations 3,810 metres (12,500 ft) to the north, 3,894 metres (12,776 ft) to the northwest, and 3,915 metres (12,844 ft) to the southeast, at three lava domes. The 10-kilometre (6 mi) hike is sandy and steep in places and can be quite taxing, particularly if there is fog.

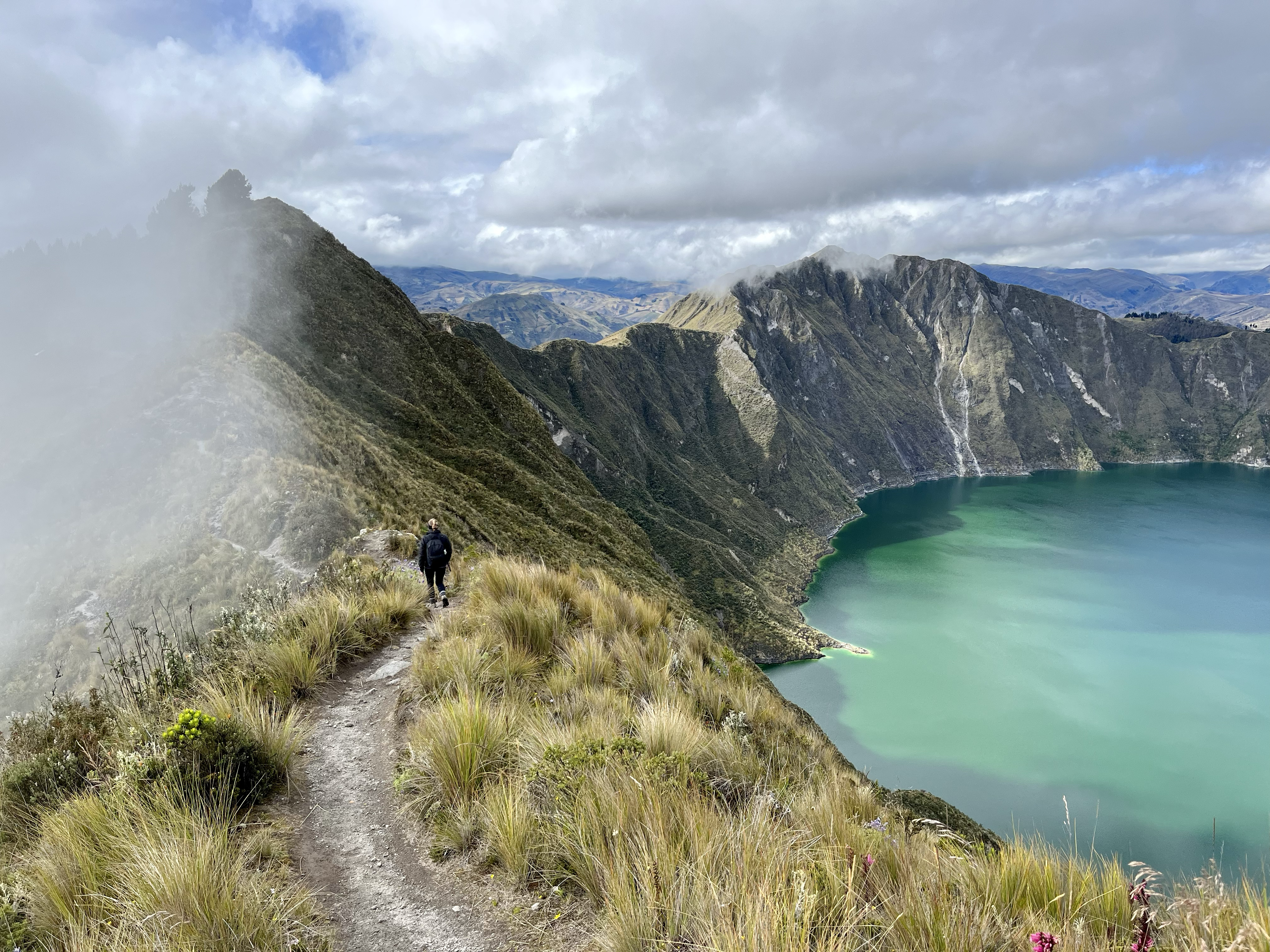
Hiking path along the Quilotoa crater, 2023

It is a half-hour hike down from the viewpoint (and 1- to 2-hour hike back up the 280-metre (919 ft) vertical ascent), and there is very basic lodging down in its bowl. Camping is permitted at the bottom of the crater, but there is no potable water (except half-litre bottles sold at the hostel)

The lake surface is located at 3,500 metres (11,483 ft) asl. The total volume of water stored in Lake Quilotoa is 0.35 km^{3} (0.084 mi^{3}). According to local inhabitants, the lake level has been slowly declining over the last 10 years. Travertine deposits occur along the shore up to 10 metres (33 ft) above the lake level (in the year 2000).

The village of Quilotoa and the associated crater is also a popular destination within the Quilotoa Loop and is a common starting point for the “Quilotoa Traverse”, a multi-day village-to-village hiking route.

== See also ==
- Volcanic crater lake
