= Franklin Tenorio =

Ecuadorian long-distance runner

Personal information
- Full name: Franklin Bolívar Tenorio Ramón
- Nationality: Ecuador
- Born: 30 June 1969 (age 57) Salcedo, Cotopaxi, Ecuador
- Height: 1.69 m (5 ft 6 1/2 in)
- Weight: 60 kg (132 lb)

Sport
- Sport: Athletics
- Event: Marathon
- Club: Concentración Deportiva de Pichincha
- Coached by: Rafael Herbas

Achievements and titles
- Personal best: Marathon – 2:10:22

Franklin Bolívar Tenorio Ramón (Note: In this Spanish name, the first or paternal surname is Tenorio and the second or maternal family name is Ramón.) (born 30 June 1969 in Salcedo, Cotopaxi) is an Ecuadorian long-distance and marathon runner. Tenorio represented Ecuador at two Olympic games, where he ran in the men's marathon, which was held annually on the last day of the competition. He finished the race in seventy-first place, with a time of 2:31:12, at the 2004 Summer Olympics in Athens, and in sixty-fifth place, with a time of 2:29:05, at the 2008 Summer Olympics in Beijing. He also achieved his personal best of 2:10:22 at the Rome Marathon in 1998.
