= Latacunga (disambiguation) =

Latacunga is a town in Ecuador and the capital of Cotopaxi Province.

Latacunga may also refer to:

- Latacunga Canton, one of the cantons of Cotopaxi Province, including the above town
- Panzaleo language, a poorly attested and unclassified indigenous American language also known as Latacunga
- Latacunga (genus), a genus of crustaceans of family Synopioidea (suborder Gammaridea)
