= La Maná =

- Town
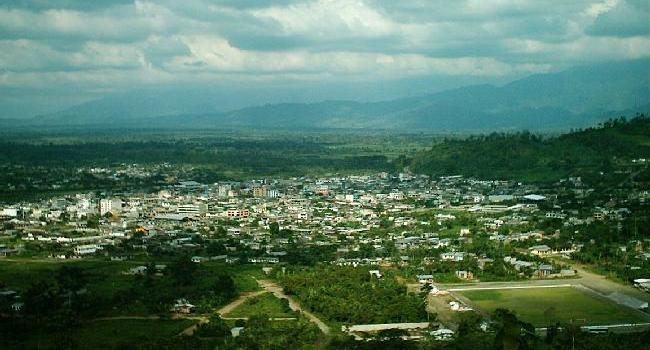

- Location within Ecuador
- Coordinates: 0°55′48″S 79°13′12″W
- Country: Ecuador
- Province: Cotopaxi Province
- Canton: La Maná Canton

Government
  - Mayor: Hipólito Carrera Benites

Area
  - Town: 8.57 km^{2} (3.31 sq mi)

Population (2022 census)
  - Town: 31,740
  - Density: 3,700/km^{2} (9,590/sq mi)

La Maná is a town in the Cotopaxi Province of Ecuador. It is the seat of the La Maná Canton. La Maná, is one of seven canton of the Cotopaxi Province in Ecuador. La Maná is not only a canton, but also is the name the main town. The canton has a total area of 66,258 acres. It is the sixth largest canton of the province of Cotopaxi.

The origin of La Mana has its mysteries and charms. La Mana, is derived from LANG MANA ATTI which means "mine of great king". It is named that because of its abundance of gold and other minerals in the subsoil. The "Colorado" word (safiqui) MANA means "beautiful, big" which is attributed to the fertility of the land. La Mana was inhabited by the Tsachilas or "Los Colorados". In the sector, many vestiges of their presence have been discovered, such as pieces of clay, zoomorphic statuettes with ornaments, and clay pots, where presumably, they melted metals like the gold that abounded in the mountains. The legislative Committee of Civil and Penal Law sent a bill for the creation of the canton La Maná, in the Cotopaxi Province. On May 19, 1986, under the government of León Febres Cordero, La Maná became a canton. In the canton, there is a monument to commemorate Carlos Lozada Quintana, who owned the La Merced Hacienda. He donated the lands for plazas, parks, streets, schools, and indispensable services for the community's welfare. La Mana, unlike other towns, is a settlement town by people who came from different parts of the country. They all brought their customs and traditions with them. Its immense forests, its gigantic plantations of banana, orito, yucca, cocoa, tobacco and coffee, as well as its strategic geographic location and its auriferous wealth, confer special characteristics that favor its development and has a leading role in Ecuadorian economy.

== Location ==
La Maná Canton is located in the foothills of the western mountain range of Los Andes. It is located on a plain of a mountain range formed by alluvial deposits covered with ashes and volcanic sands of unknown origin. The main town sits on an ancient alluvial terrace of the San Pablo River. It has several climatic levels that vary from subtropical to tropical.

== Climate ==
The annual average temperature is 23 °C. The months with the highest temperature are March and April with 28 to 30º and the month with the lowest temperature is July with 18 °C. La Maná has two seasons: dry and wet season. During the dry season, the temperature is cooler with a minimum of 18 °C and it does not rain at all. For the wet season, the temperature reaches its peak at 30 °C and is very humid and rainy. The rain can cause floods in certain parts of the canton. Usually the wet season starts in December and ends in May. The dry season starts in June and ends in November.

Climate data for La Maná (San Juan La Maná), elevation 223 m (732 ft), (1971–2000)
Month	Jan	Feb	Mar	Apr	May	Jun	Jul	Aug	Sep	Oct	Nov	Dec	Year
Mean daily maximum °C (°F)	28.5 (83.3)	29.0 (84.2)	29.5 (85.1)	29.6 (85.3)	28.4 (83.1)	26.9 (80.4)	26.3 (79.3)	26.9 (80.4)	27.5 (81.5)	27.1 (80.8)	27.2 (81.0)	28.1 (82.6)	27.9 (82.2)
Mean daily minimum °C (°F)	20.5 (68.9)	20.7 (69.3)	20.8 (69.4)	21.0 (69.8)	20.5 (68.9)	19.9 (67.8)	18.9 (66.0)	18.7 (65.7)	19.0 (66.2)	19.2 (66.6)	19.2 (66.6)	19.9 (67.8)	19.9 (67.8)
Average precipitation mm (inches)	445.0 (17.52)	470.0 (18.50)	563.0 (22.17)	481.0 (18.94)	264.0 (10.39)	126.0 (4.96)	19.0 (0.75)	25.0 (0.98)	46.0 (1.81)	48.0 (1.89)	38.0 (1.50)	174.0 (6.85)	2,699 (106.26)
Average relative humidity (%)	87	86	86	86	88	89	87	86	86	86	85	85	86
Source: FAO

== Tourist Attractions ==
=== Las 7 Cascadas ===
Las 7 Cascadas is a series of natural waterfalls in Pangua Canton. This attraction gets a lot of tourists. This natural attraction belongs to Canton Pangua However, due to the location is so close to La Maná, it is considered as a part of this canton.

=== The Cañaveral ===
The Cañaveral is a natural gold mine located 12 km from the centre of La Mana.

=== Mirador Pucayacu ===
Mirador Pucayacu is located five minutes from the urban center of Pucayacu. At the summit there is a view of the entire Pucayacu town.

=== Cascada Guadual ===
Cascada Guadual is located 15 km away from Pucayacu. It is necessary to follow a path to arrive there. The main attraction of the site is a 25 metre waterfall and an accompanying natural pool suitable for swimming. To get to the location, it is necessary to have a tourist guide to ensure the safety of the tourist.

=== Cascada de Brasil ===
It is located about 8 km from the center of Pucayacu and a two-hour walk from the Pucayacu – Sigchos road. The waterfall has an approximate height of 15 meters with an emerald colored lagoon of 5 meters in diameter. In the surrounding areas are flora species such as: orchids, Camacho (Xanthosoma undipes), Pambil (Wettinia Mayencis), Platanillo (Heliconia bihai L), ferns (Pteridium quilinum), and others. Among the species of fauna are butterflies, woodpeckers (Colaptes melanochloros) and many others.

=== Traditional Fair of Pucayacu Parish ===
The fair is held every Thursday and has been held for more than 50 years. The products for sale are green plantain, pork, beef, and vegetables from the sierra, Manaba cheeses, and Chinese potato. One negative aspect of this fair is the littering that occurs from the customers. You can also find lodging and food services near here.

=== Guasaganda ===
Guasaganda is a town of the canton La Maná, and it is located in the lower part of the province of Cotopaxi, about 60 kilometers from Quevedo. Its history is born with the first settlers that came from Sucre and Carmela, but the first inhabitants were the Indigenas who arrived from Saquisilí, Sigchos, Zumbahua, Chugchilán and Moreta. In addition, it is said that the Pucayaquenses colonized it. These uncultivated lands crossed the zone of the mountain range to Selecto. They were rough grounds that were difficult to cross because of the Guasaganda, Barropungo and Quindigua rivers. According to investigations the name ¨Guasa¨ comes from the Castilian word meaning "rude" and "Ganda" means "augmentative," which can be interpreted to Big Land. Guasaganda was populated by wild animals, contributing to the difficulty of the journey, hence the name ¨Guasaganda¨.

=== Hacienda Malqui ===
This attraction is located in the north of the Pucayacu. It is about an hour and a half from La Maná. It was not known that the pile of stone that were in the property were an archaeological site, which were from the Atahualpa tomb. ¨Malqui¨ means "body or mummy of the Incas's ancestors". According to the distribution of the plants and the position of the infrastructure, it is estimated to be a populated center and more than 100 years old. On this cattle ranch, approximately 90 acres, people produce panela and artisan liquor.

=== Machay Archaeological Site ===
The Machay ruins is an archielogical site in Peru. It contains historical paintings and is located on the mountain of Ocpay which is situated southwest of the Singa District. The site that houses the ruins of Machay belongs to the Malgui region, and is believed to be a site of worship, with stone constructions and pieces found by researchers dating from the time of the Incas. It is currently part of the Malqui Machay cultural project.
