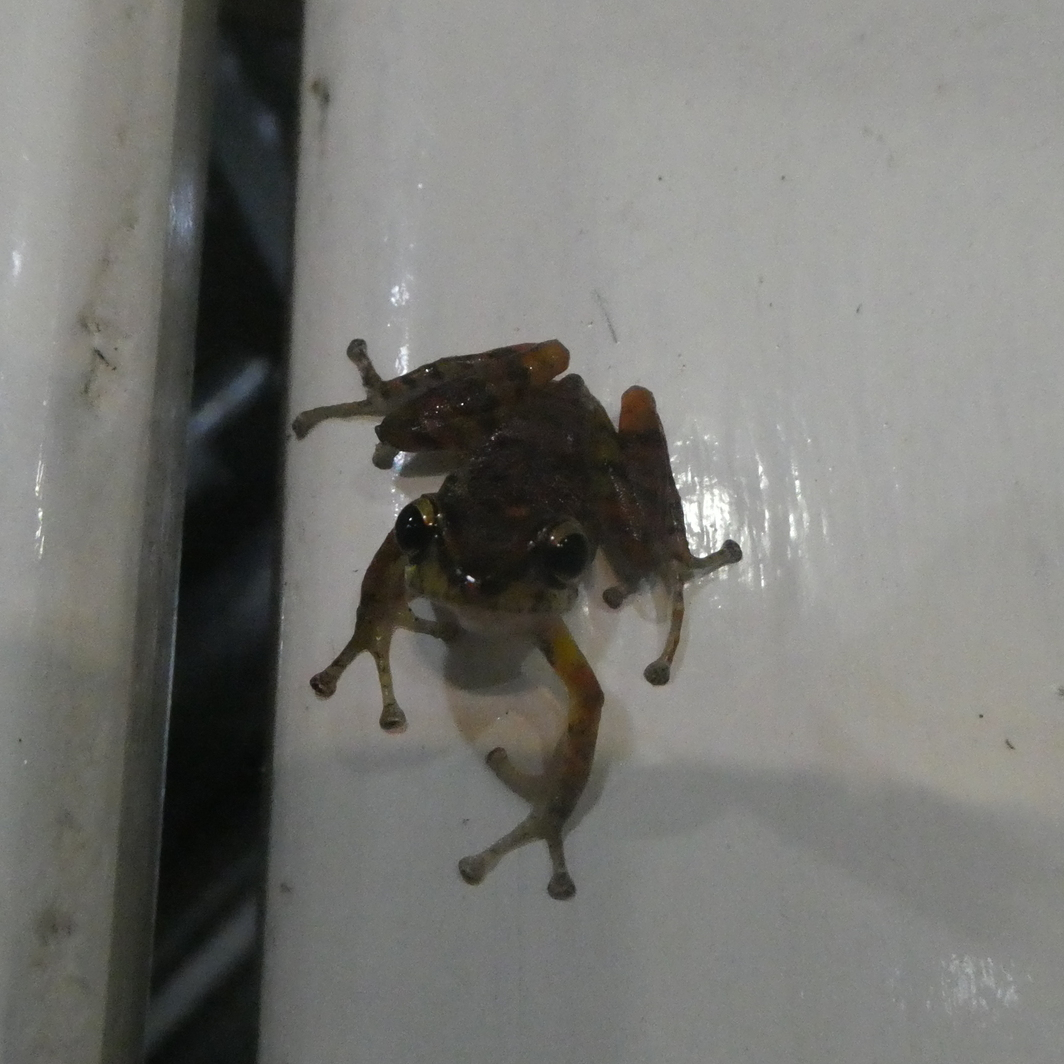

Conservation status
- Vulnerable (IUCN 3.1)

Scientific classification
- Kingdom: Animalia
- Phylum: Chordata
- Class: Amphibia
- Order: Anura
- Clade: Brachycephaloidea
- Family: Craugastoridae
- Genus: Pristimantis
- Species: P. nyctophylax

Binomial name
- Pristimantis nyctophylax (Lynch, 1976)

Synonyms
- Eleutherodactylus nyctophylax Lynch, 1976

= Pristimantis nyctophylax =

Species of frog

Pristimantis nyctophylax, also known as Tandapi robber frog or watchful rainfrog, is a species of frog in the family Strabomantidae. It is endemic to Ecuador where it is known from the western flank of the Andes in the Cotopaxi and Pichincha Provinces. Its natural habitat is tropical cloud forests. It is threatened by habitat loss.
