= Kleinere Schriften (Alexander von Humboldt) =

1853 anthology of scientific works

Kleinere Schriften (Smaller Writings) of Alexander von Humboldt are an important 1853 collection of Humboldt's shorter scientific works, particularly dealing with natural science and geology, and especially concerning volcanology. It is considered one of Humboldt's major works.

== Background and contents ==
Alexander von Humboldt (1769–1859), together with his travel companion Aimé Bonpland (1773–1858), spent several years in South America at the beginning of the 19th century, where he had the opportunity to explore more volcanoes than any other European naturalist before him.

The first edition of this collection of geological essays (some of which had previously been published) also includes Humboldt's geognostic and physical study of the volcanoes in the surroundings of Quito in Ecuador. His findings confirmed the volcanic origin of the Andes and helped to refute the theories of the "Neptunists," who believed that all rocks on Earth had formed through sedimentation.

The atlas volume, published under a separate title Umrisse aus den Vulcanen aus den Cordillieren von Quito und Mexico. Ein Beitrag zur Physiognomik der Natur (Outlines of the Volcanoes of the Cordilleras of Quito and Mexico. A Contribution to the Physiognomy of Nature), contains several illustrations of South American volcanoes.

Both volumes were published in 1853 in Stuttgart and Tübingen by Cotta.

The content of the text volume comprises Alexander von Humboldt's geognostic and physical observations on the volcanoes of the Quito highlands and other results of his geographical high-mountain research in South America, investigations on isothermal lines, on eudiometric methods and the proportions of the essential components of the atmosphere (together with Gay-Lussac), on the average elevation of the continents, on the distribution of heat on the Earth's surface, etc., as well as the detailed account of his famous attempt to ascend Chimborazo. The plates show the mighty, snow-covered volcanoes of South America, including El Corazon, Popocatepetl, the remarkable Cotopaxi, and Chimborazo, which at the time was considered the highest mountain in the world.

== Table of contents ==
The Smaller Writings contain (preserving the characteristics of the original):

Preface
Geognostic and physical observations on the volcanoes of the highlands of Quito:

1st essay, read at the Berlin Academy on 9 February 1837
2nd essay, read at the Berlin Academy on 10 May 1838
3rd essay:

a) Journey of La Condamine and Bouguer to Pichincha
b) Expedition of Mr. Wisse into the interior of the crater of Pichincha

On the high plateau of Bogotá
Attempt to ascend the summit of Chimborazo, on 22 June 1802

Annotations thereto

Boussingault's ascent of Chimborazo
On isothermal lines (from Vol. III of the Mémoires de la Société d'Arcueil, Paris 1817)

including a plate of the isothermal zones

Investigations on eudiometric methods and on the proportions of the essential components of the atmosphere by A. v. Humboldt and I. L. Gay-Lussac (read at the French Institute on 21 January 1805)
On the nocturnal intensification of sound (essay read at the Académie des sciences in Paris, 13 March 1820)

new additions

On the average height of the continents
Distribution of heat on the Earth's surface in the annual period:

five plates, edition of Vol. I, 1853 at the end of the volume
note on these 5 plates and the one from 1817
alphabetical index of places or stations on the 5 plates

Index of copperplate engravings of volcanoes in the Cordilleras of Quito and Mexico contained in the atlas
