= El Corazón =

El Corazón may refer to:

- El Corazón, Cotopaxi
- El Corazón (Don Cherry and Ed Blackwell album), 1982
- El Corazón (Steve Earle album), 1997
