= Pujilí =

- Town
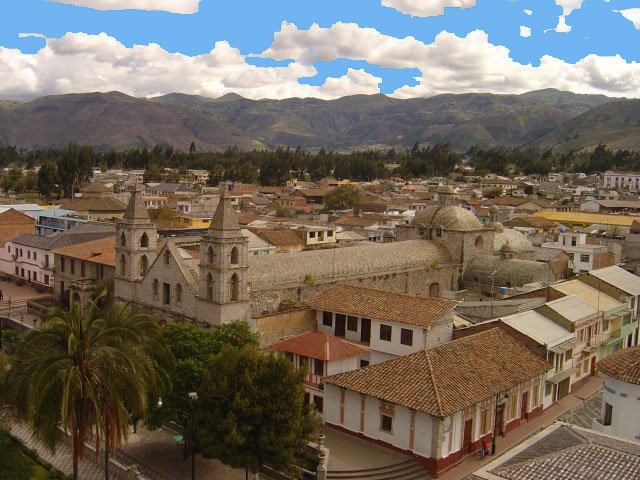
- Pujilí

- Location within Ecuador
- Coordinates: 0°57′0″S 78°41′24″W
- Country: Ecuador
- Province: Cotopaxi Province
- Canton: Pujilí Canton

Government
  - Mayor: José Arroyo Cabrera

Area
  - Town: 4.81 km^{2} (1.86 sq mi)

Population (2022 census)
  - Town: 16,152
  - Density: 3,360/km^{2} (8,700/sq mi)

Pujilí is a town in the Cotopaxi Province of Ecuador, located ten to twenty minutes from Latacunga, to the south of Quito, the Ecuadoran Capital. It is the seat of the Pujilí Canton. Most who live in Pujili are Quechua speaking indigenous peoples. The Pujili market, which takes place on Sundays and Wednesdays, features locally made textiles, pottery and ceramics. It is smaller and less touristed than the larger market in Otavalo, to the North of Quito. Pujilí is also home to churches, artisan shops, and a yellow and blue staircase with a view of the town.

Pujilí is the birthplace of General Guillermo Rodríguez Lara (born 4 November 1923), a career army officer who was president of Ecuador from 1972 to 1976. After being removed from power in 1976, Lara retired to his farm outside Pujilí.

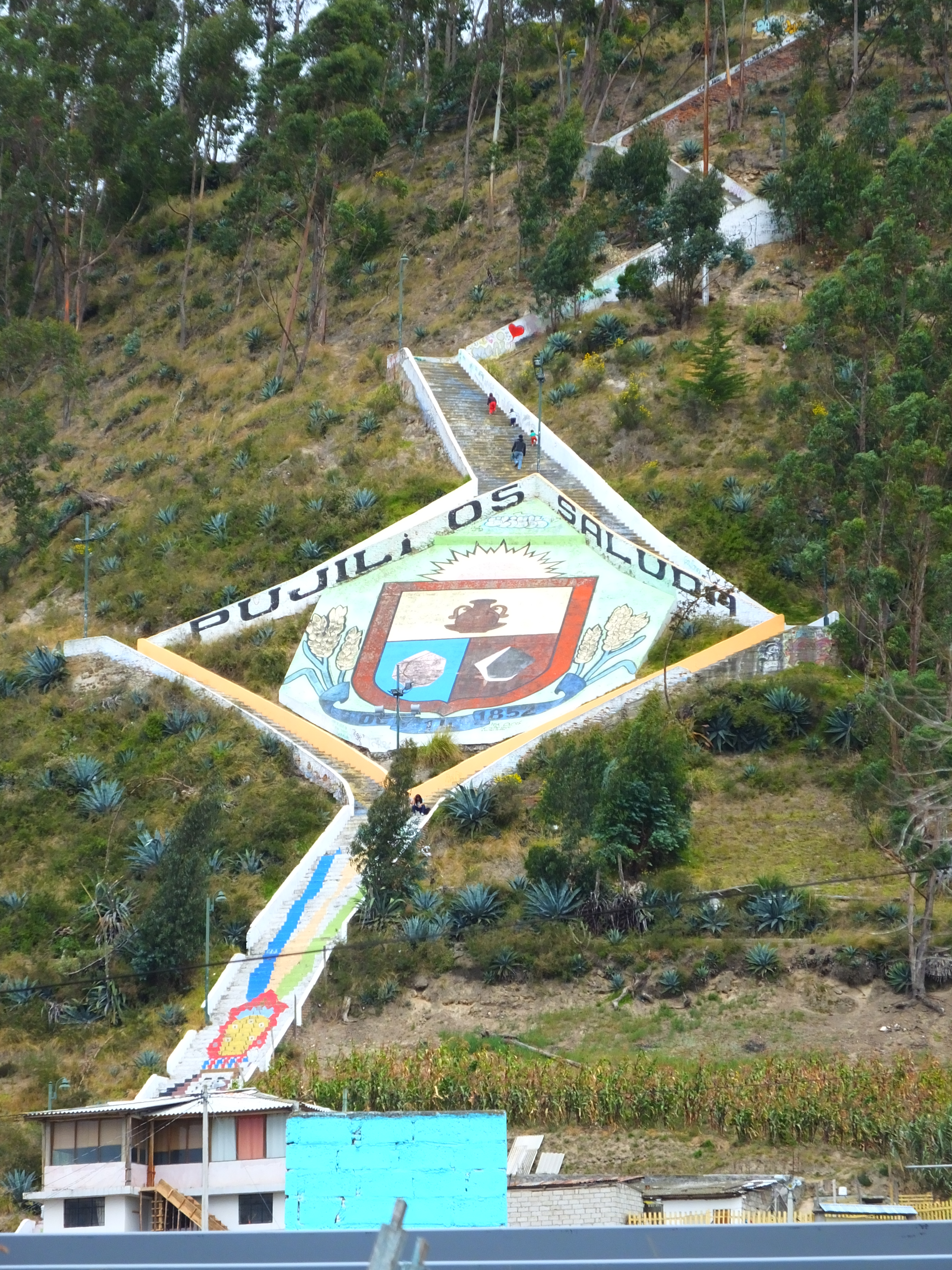
Hillside display

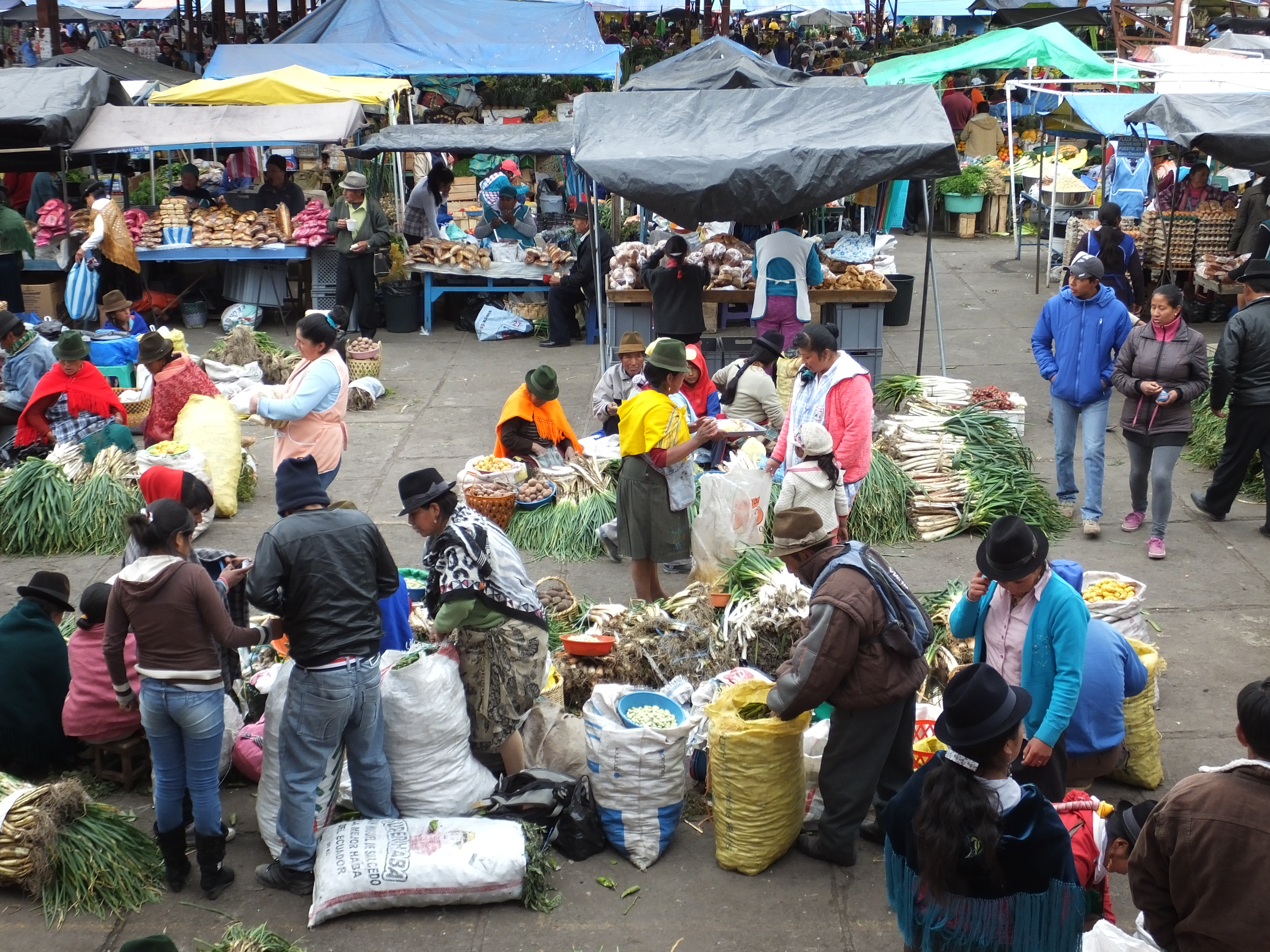
Market scene

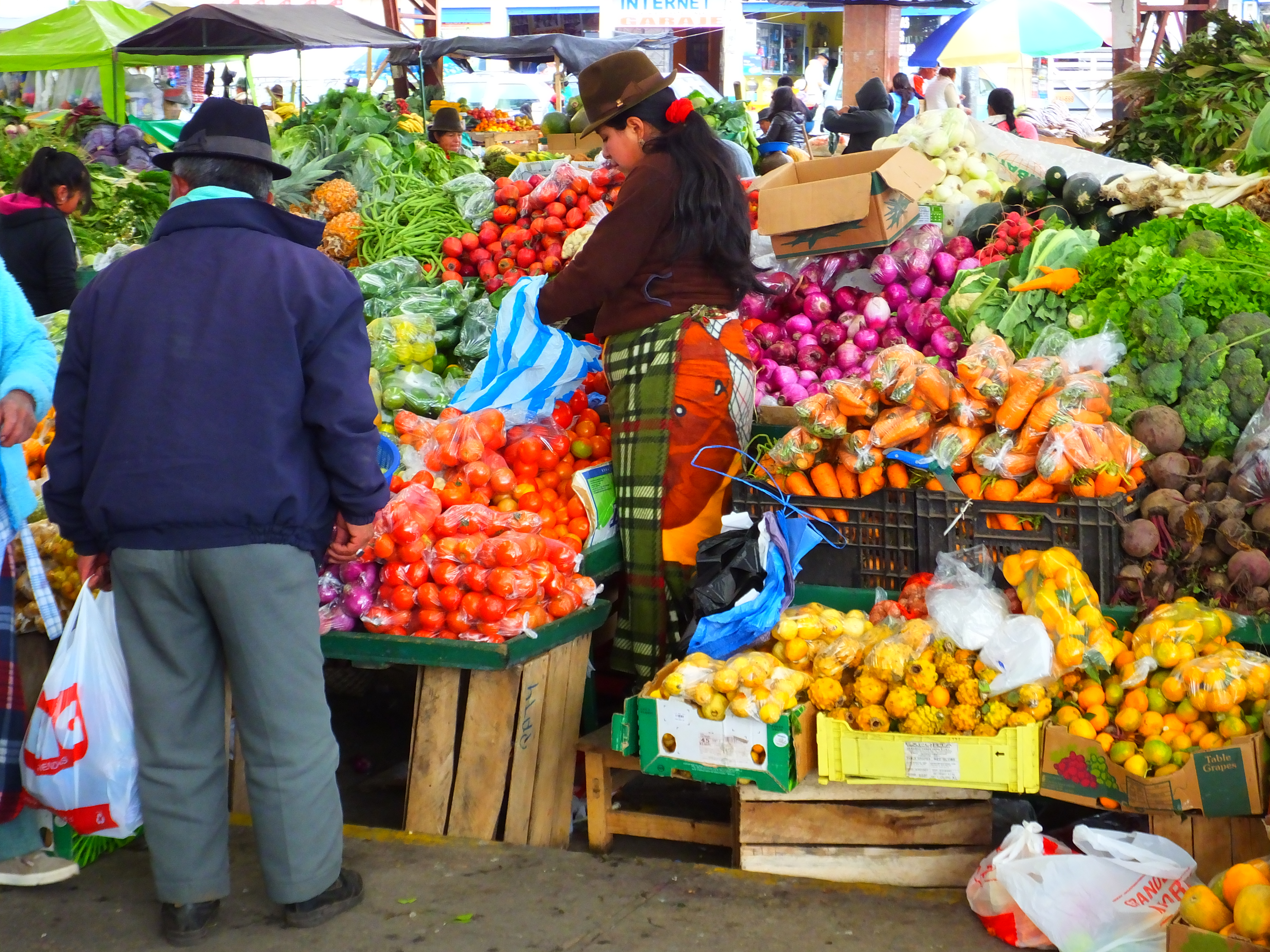
Market scene

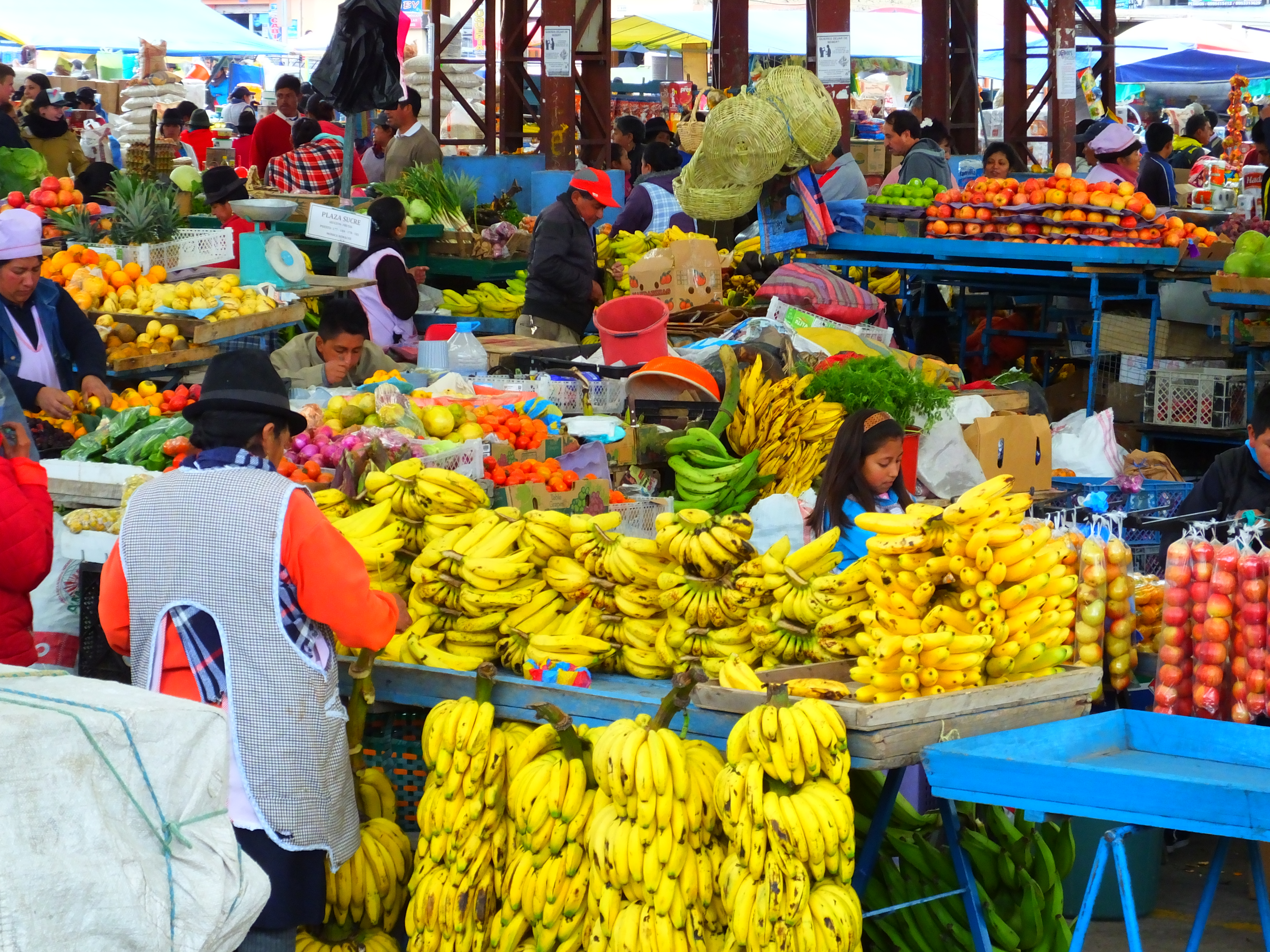
Market scene
