= Sigchos =

- Town
- Location within Ecuador
- Coordinates: 00°42′0″S 78°53′0″W
- Country: Ecuador
- Canton: Sigchos Canton

Government
  - Mayor: Hugo Arguello Navarro

Area
  - Town: 1.6 km^{2} (0.62 sq mi)

Population (2022 census)
  - Town: 2,816
  - Density: 1,800/km^{2} (4,600/sq mi)
- Time zone: ECT
- Website: www.cotopaxi.gov.ec

Sigchos is a town in Cotopaxi Province, Ecuador.
