= Salcedo, Ecuador =

San Miguel de Salcedo
- City
- Location within Ecuador
- Coordinates: 1°3′0″S 78°35′0″W
- Country: Ecuador
- Province: Cotopaxi
- Canton: Salcedo Canton

Area
  - City: 5.13 km^{2} (1.98 sq mi)
- Elevation: 2,683 m (8,802 ft)

Population (2022 census)
  - City: 16,751
  - Density: 3,270/km^{2} (8,460/sq mi)
- Website: http://www.salcedo.gob.ec/

San Miguel de Salcedo (better known as Salcedo) is a city in Cotopaxi Province, Ecuador. It is the capital of Salcedo Canton.

== Climate ==
Climate data for Salcedo (Rumipamba–Salcedo), elevation 2,628 m (8,622 ft), (1989–2006)
Month	Jan	Feb	Mar	Apr	May	Jun	Jul	Aug	Sep	Oct	Nov	Dec	Year
Mean daily maximum °C (°F)	21.5 (70.7)	21.2 (70.2)	21.1 (70.0)	20.7 (69.3)	20.0 (68.0)	18.8 (65.8)	18.9 (66.0)	19.3 (66.7)	20.7 (69.3)	21.6 (70.9)	22.1 (71.8)	21.9 (71.4)	20.7 (69.2)
Daily mean °C (°F)	14.6 (58.3)	14.4 (57.9)	14.6 (58.3)	14.5 (58.1)	14.2 (57.6)	13.5 (56.3)	12.9 (55.2)	12.9 (55.2)	13.8 (56.8)	14.8 (58.6)	14.9 (58.8)	14.8 (58.6)	14.2 (57.5)
Mean daily minimum °C (°F)	9.0 (48.2)	9.3 (48.7)	9.7 (49.5)	9.6 (49.3)	9.5 (49.1)	8.9 (48.0)	8.1 (46.6)	7.4 (45.3)	7.8 (46.0)	8.5 (47.3)	9.0 (48.2)	9.1 (48.4)	8.8 (47.9)
Average precipitation mm (inches)	48.5 (1.91)	56.0 (2.20)	62.1 (2.44)	57.0 (2.24)	54.6 (2.15)	31.1 (1.22)	15.6 (0.61)	12.8 (0.50)	29.2 (1.15)	50.4 (1.98)	61.5 (2.42)	54.7 (2.15)	533.5 (20.97)
Average relative humidity (%)	73.2	75.4	76.1	77.3	78.3	77.7	75.9	73.8	72.7	73.0	73.6	74.1	75.1
Source: Instituto Nacional de Meteorología e Hidrología
