= Relexification =

Language change by vocabulary replacement or absorption

In linguistics, relexification is a mechanism of language change by which one language changes much or all of its lexicon, including basic vocabulary, to the lexicon of another language, without drastically changing the relexified language's grammar. The term is principally used to describe pidgins, creoles, and mixed languages.

Relexification is not synonymous with lexical borrowing, by which a language merely supplements its basic vocabulary with loanwords from another language.

== Language creation and relexification hypothesis ==
Relexification is a form of language interference in which a pidgin, a creole or a mixed language takes nearly all of its lexicon from a superstrate or a target language while its grammar comes from the substrate or source language or, according to universalist theories, arises from universal principles of simplification and grammaticalization. The language from which the lexicon is derived is called the "lexifier". Michif, Media Lengua, and Lanc-Patuá creole are mixed languages that arose through relexification.

A hypothesis that all creole languages derive their grammar from the medieval Mediterranean Lingua Franca was widely held in the late 1950s and the early 1960s, but it fell out of favour. It was later argued, for example, because of underlying similarities between Haitian Creole and Fon language that the grammar of Haitian Creole is a substratum that was created when Fon-speaking African slaves relexified their language with French vocabulary. However, the role of relexification in creole genesis is disputed by adherents of generative grammar. Wittmann (1994), Wittmann & Fournier (1996), Singler (1996), and DeGraff (2002), for example, have argued that the similarities in syntax reflect a hypothetical Universal Grammar, not the workings of relexification processes.

== Second language acquisition ==
Spontaneous second language acquisition (and the genesis of pidgins) involves the gradual relexification of the native or source language with target-language vocabulary. After relexification is completed, native language structures alternate with structures acquired from the target language.

== Conlangs and jargon ==
In the context of constructed languages, jargons, and argots, the term is applied to the process of creating a language by substituting new vocabulary into the grammar of an existing language, often one's native language.

While the practice is most often associated with novice constructed language designers, it may also be done as an initial stage towards creating a more sophisticated language. A language thus created is known as a relex. For instance, Lojban began as a relex of Loglan, but the languages' grammars have diverged since then. The same process is at work in the genesis of jargons and argots such as Caló, a natural language used by Gitanos that mixes a Spanish grammar with Romany vocabulary.

== See also ==
- Stratum (linguistics)
