= Saquisilí Canton =

- Canton
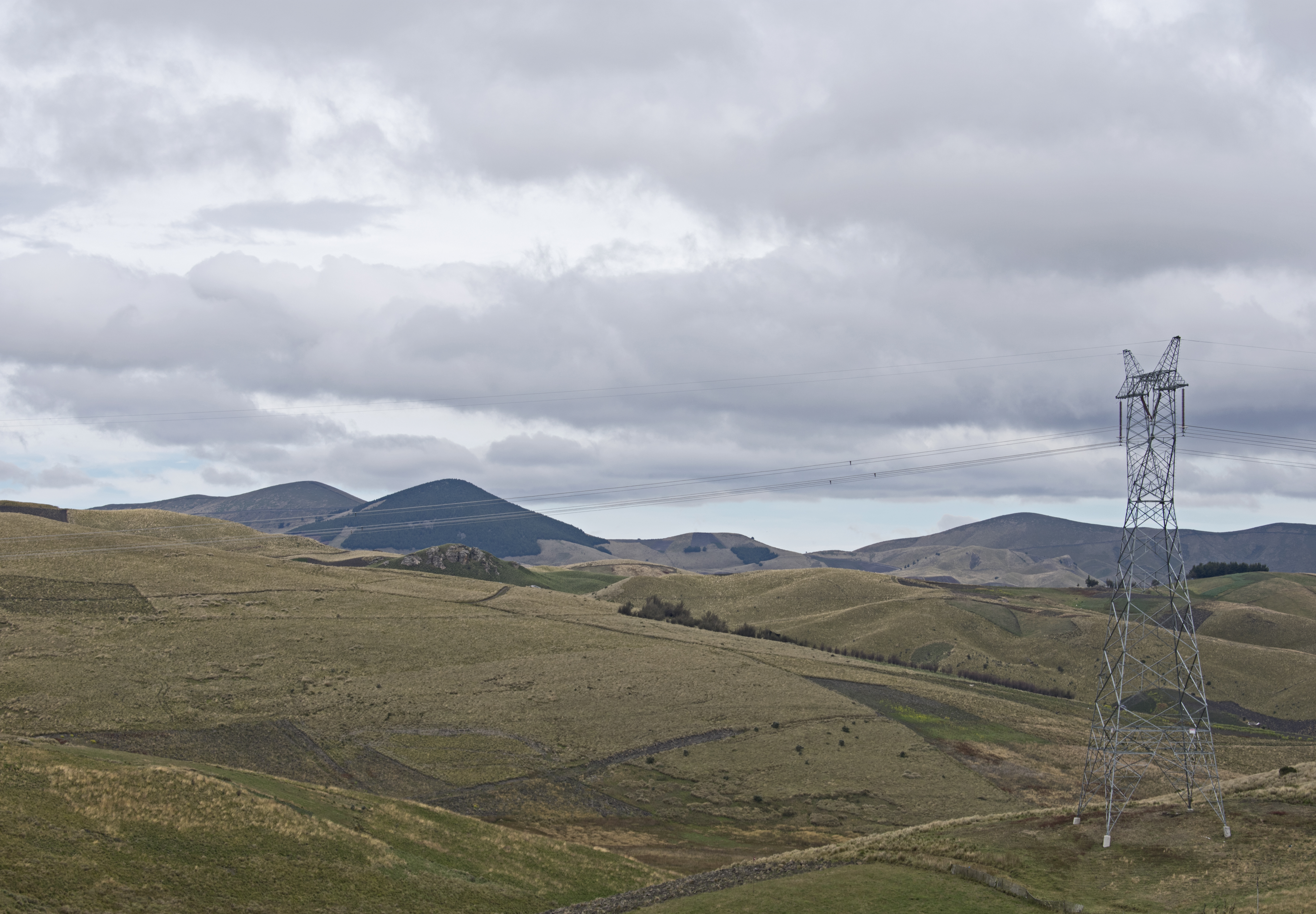
- Hills northwest of Milinpunku

- Location of Cotopaxi Province in Ecuador.

- Saquisilí Canton in Cotopaxi Province
- Coordinates: 0°49′48″S 78°40′12″W
- Country: Ecuador
- Province: Cotopaxi Province
- Capital: Saquisilí

Area
  - Total: 156.3 km^{2} (60.3 sq mi)

Population (2022 census)
  - Total: 24,356
  - Density: 155.8/km^{2} (403.6/sq mi)
- Time zone: UTC-5 (ECT)

Saquisilí Canton is a canton of Ecuador, located in the Cotopaxi Province. Its capital is the town of Saquisilí. Its population at the 2001 census was 20,815.

== Demographics ==
Ethnic groups as of the Ecuadorian census of 2010:

- Mestizo 50.7%
- Indigenous 47.4%
- Afro-Ecuadorian 0.9%
- White 0.7%
- Montubio 0.3%
- Other 0.0%
