= Centro de Levantamientos Integrados de Recursos Naturales por Sensores Remotos =

The Center for Integrated Survey of Natural Resources by Remote Sensing (CLIRSEN) is currently making a base of satellite data located on the boundaries of the provinces of Pichincha and Cotopaxi in Ecuador.

== History ==
The origins of the base date back to 1957, when the Ecuadorian government of Camilo Ponce started scientific collaborations with NASA. During the sixties the Ecuadorians received signals and monitored missions for the Apollo program, including the famous Apollo 11 mission.

== Services ==
The center of integrated surveys of natural resources by remote sensing is a project that seeks to encompass a number of scientific, educational, among others for development of aerospace Ecuador. The agency regulates activities that space is the Ecuadorian Air Force in coordination with the Military Geographical Institute.
