= La Maná Canton =

- Canton
- Location of Cotopaxi Province in Ecuador.

- La Maná Canton in Cotopaxi Province
- Coordinates: 0°55′48″S 79°13′12″W
- Country: Ecuador
- Province: Cotopaxi Province
- Capital: La Maná

Area
  - Total: 660.2 km^{2} (254.9 sq mi)

Population (2022 census)
  - Total: 53,793
- Time zone: UTC-5 (ECT)

La Maná Canton is a canton of Ecuador in the Cotopaxi Province. Its capital is the town of La Maná. Its population at the 2001 census was 32,115.

== Demographics ==
Ethnic groups as of the Ecuadorian census of 2010:

- Mestizo 81.6%
- Montubio 6.5%
- Afro-Ecuadorian 5.9%
- White 3.9%
- Indigenous 1.8%
- Other 0.3%
