= Zumbahua =

Town in Cotopaxi, Ecuador

- town
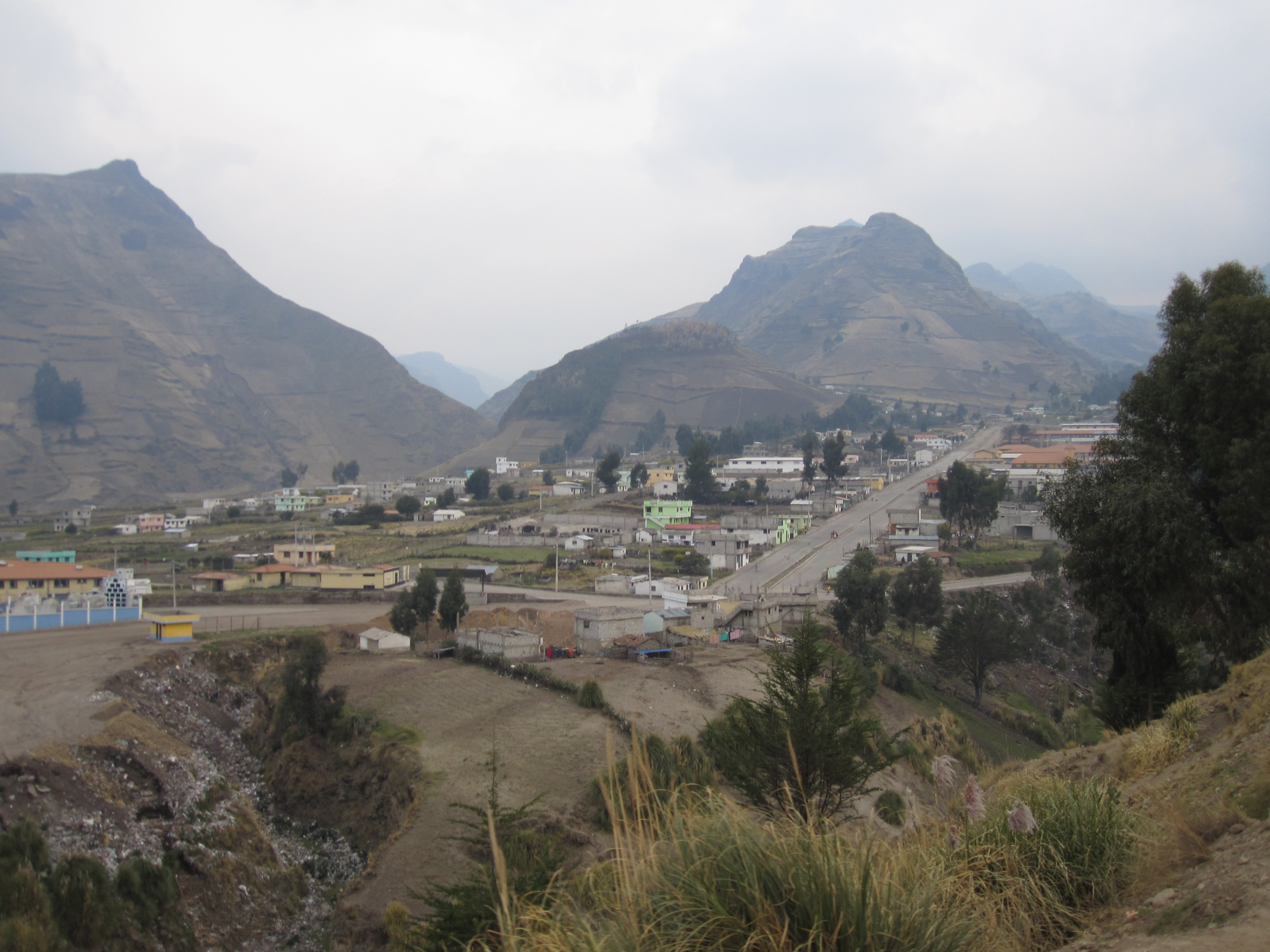

- Location within Ecuador
- Coordinates: 0.955766°S 78.901749°W
- Country: Ecuador
- Province: Cotopaxi
- Canton: Pujilí Canton

Population (2001)
  - Total: 11,895

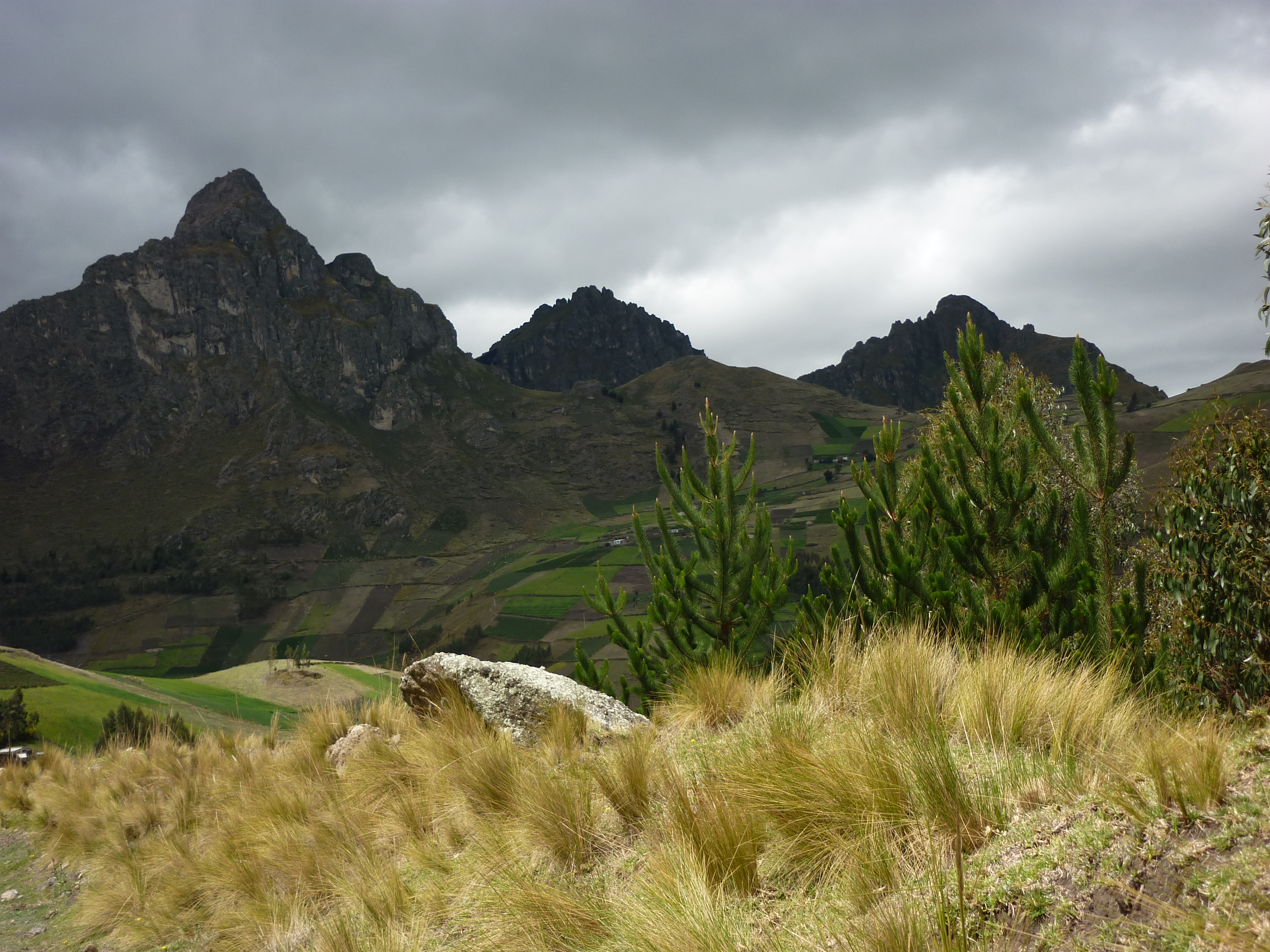
Montañas de Zumbahua.

Zumbahua is a town in Pujilí Canton, Cotopaxi Province, Ecuador. At the 2001 census, Zumbahua had a population of 11,895 (5,455 men and 6,440 women) living in 2,352 households.

Zumbahua's residents are predominantly Quichua, of the Panzaleo group.

The town has a colorful Saturday market. Houses in Zumbahua were traditionally chozos, but in recent years these have been replaced by cement and metal block houses.
