= Lourdes Tibán =

Ecuadorian politician

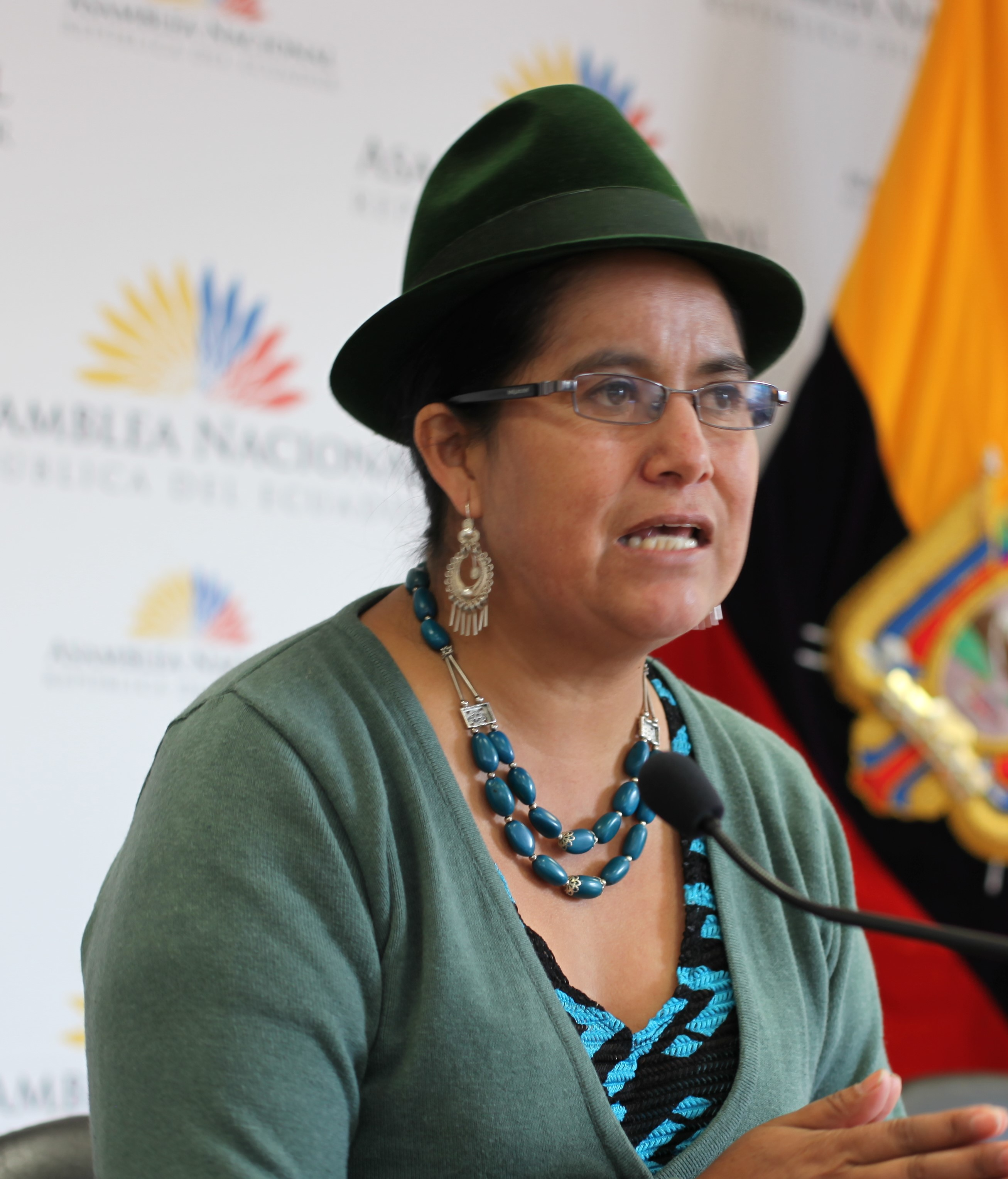

Member of United Nations Permanent Forum on Indigenous Issues for Latin America and Caribe
- Incumbent
- Assumed office 1 January 2017

Member of National Assembly
- In office 1 August 2009 – 14 May 2017

Prefect of Cotopaxi
- Incumbent
- Assumed office 14 May 2023
- Preceded by: Silvia Bravo

Personal details
- Born: 15 October 1969 (age 56) Salcedo Canton
- Party: Pachakutik; Plurinational Unity of the Lefts
- Education: Central University of Ecuador; Latin American Social Sciences Institute
- Occupation: Politician
- Known for: Indigenous activism
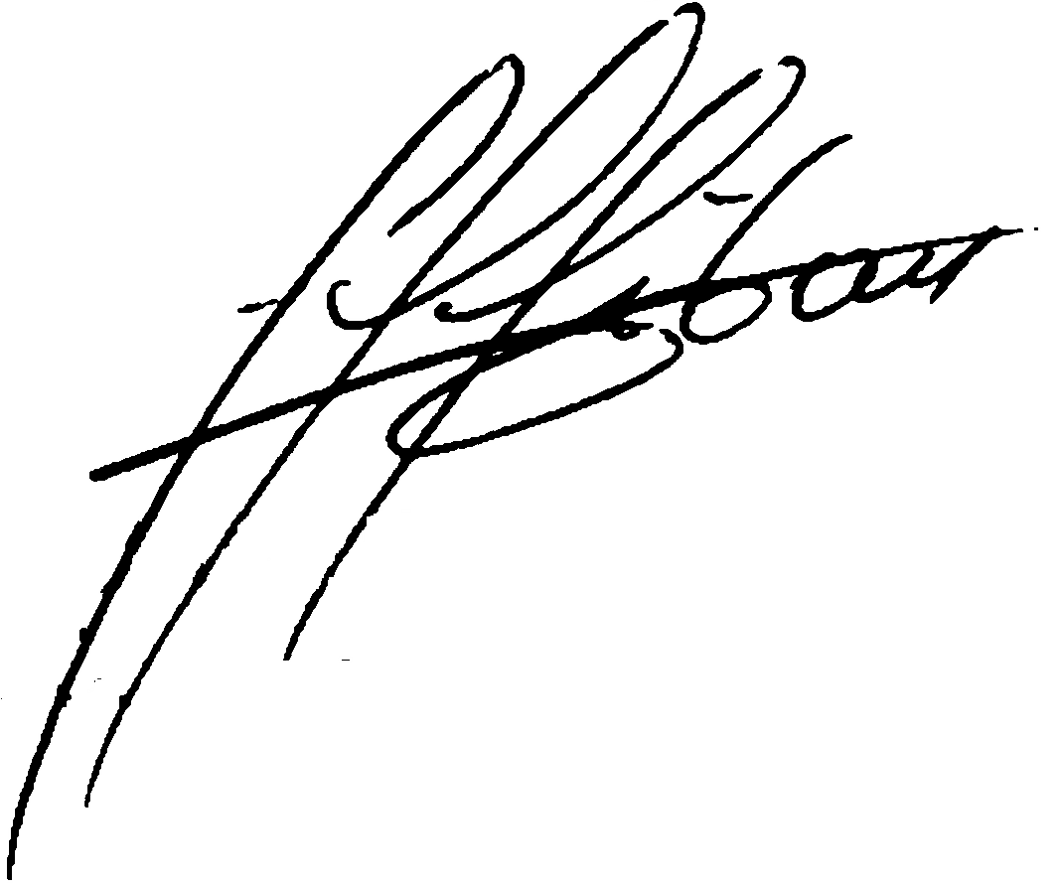
- Signature

Lourdes Licenia Tibán Guala (born 15 October 1969) is an Ecuadorian lawyer politician and is currently a member of the United Nations Permanent Forum on Indigenous Issues and is considered one of the national leaders of the indigenous movement. She was one of the main opposition assembly members in the Rafael Correa government. She was also member of the National Assembly.

== Life ==
She was born on 15 October 1969 in the indigenous community of Chirinche Bajo, in the Salcedo Canton, Cotopaxi Province. She left her home when she was 14, so she had to work in family gardens and later as a maid in Ambato. At age 19, she began studying high school at a distance.

In 2002 she graduated as a Doctor in Jurisprudence at the Central University of Ecuador and in 2007 she received the master's degree in Social Sciences at the Latin American Faculty of Social Sciences

== Political career ==
=== Beginnings ===
She started her political life in 1997 as an advisor to Deputy Leonidas Iza. Years later, she became Undersecretary of Rural Development in the Ministry of Social Welfare under the government of Lucio Gutiérrez, leaving the post when the existing alliance between the Government and Pachakutik was broken.

In 2005 she became executive secretary of the Development Council of Nationalities and Peoples of Ecuador (Codenpe), since she served until 2009. During this time she met the then Minister of Finance, Rafael Correa, with whom, as she has indicated, had a discussion about the financing of the institution, a discussion in which it was supported by Alfredo Palacio and which Tibán argued that it was one of the causes of Correa's departure from office. By 2009, with Correa in power, she had to resign from his position because of the criticism of the president against her, who called her "poor woman" and accused her of having spent funds from the Codenpe in protests against the regime. Tibán responded by denouncing the elimination of the budget to the Codenpe by the Government and asserting that the president's attacks constituted a retaliation for having personally participated in marches against the Mining Law promoted by the central government at that time.

=== Congresswoman ===
After leaving Codenpe, she announced her intention to launch herself as a candidate for an assembly member of the Cotopaxi Province. In the 2009 legislative elections she won a seat in the Assembly by Pachakutik. She was part of the Rights Commission Collective, Community and Interculturality. She also held the second term as vocal of the Legislative Administration Council from 2009 to 2011.

During her period as an assemblyman she took a strong position against the Government of Rafael Correa. He was one of the main promoters of the campaign for the "No", during the constitutional referendum and popular consultation of 2011. He also impelled the president to grant amnesty to those he called "persecuted politicians" of 2010 Ecuador crisis, among which was one of his brothers, after the president declared before the international press that he sought "national harmony."

Months before the 2013 legislative elections, she was elected presidential precandidate by the Pachakutik movement. But once the Plurinational Unity of the Lefts was constituted (alliance between several movements and leftist parties that included Pachakutik), she went on to head the list of National assembly members for this group, Tibán, along with four other Pachakutik colleagues, were elected.

During the prelude to the 2017 presidential elections, she was again selected as the candidate for the presidency of the republic by Pachakutik, after winning the primary elections of the movement with 46.7% of the votes (surpassing Salvador Quishpe by almost twenty percentage points, who came in second place). However, at the end of September 2016 the decision of the movement to withdraw Tibán's candidacy and support Paco Moncayo, candidate of the Democratic Left, was announced.

At the beginning of 2017 she was appointed member of the UN Permanent Forum on Indigenous Issues for the period 2017–2019.
