= Saquisilí =

- Town
- Location within Ecuador
- Coordinates: 0°49′48″S 78°40′12″W
- Country: Ecuador
- Province: Cotopaxi Province
- Canton: Saquisilí Canton

Government
  - Mayor: José Segundo Jami Llumitasig

Area
  - Town: 4.53 km^{2} (1.75 sq mi)

Population (2022 census)
  - Town: 9,883
  - Density: 2,180/km^{2} (5,650/sq mi)
- Website: municipiosaquisili.gov

Saquisilí is a town in the Cotopaxi Province of Ecuador. It is the seat of the Saquisilí Canton. Sasquisilí is located about 25 minutes from Latacunga and 2.5 hours from Quito. The town, located off the Pan-American Highway, is best known for the local market held in its eight plazas on Thursdays . Unlike Otavalo, the market is mainly for locals from the highlands who come to buy pots and pans, electronics, herbal remedies, livestock or produce . To go to the animal market, arrive between 7 and 9 a.m.

Traditional food is available in the market, which serves the local population rather than the tourist trade.
