= Sigchos Canton =

- Canton
- Location of Cotopaxi Province in Ecuador.

- Sigchos Canton in Cotopaxi Province
- Coordinates: 00°42′0″S 78°53′0″W
- Country: Ecuador
- Province: Cotopaxi Province
- Capital: Sigchos

Area
  - Total: 1,357 km^{2} (524 sq mi)

Population (2022 census)
  - Total: 18,460
  - Density: 13.60/km^{2} (35.23/sq mi)
- Time zone: UTC-5 (ECT)

Sigchos Canton is a canton of Ecuador, located in the Cotopaxi Province. Its capital is the town of Sigchos. Its population at the 2001 census was 20,722.

== Demographics ==
Ethnic groups as of the Ecuadorian census of 2010:

- Mestizo 52.7%
- Indigenous 40.8%
- Montubio 3.7%
- White 2.0%
- Afro-Ecuadorian 0.8%
- Other 0.1%
