= Pangua Canton =

- Canton
- Pangua Canton in Cotopaxi Province

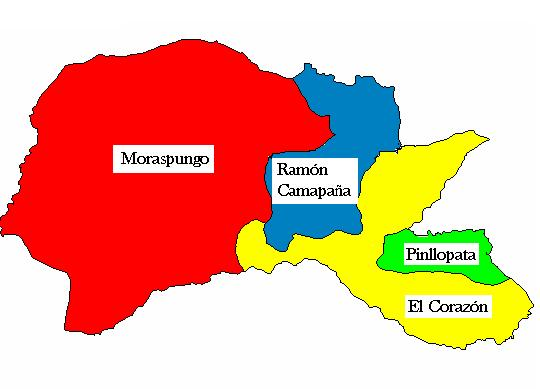
- Parishes of Pangua Canton
- Coordinates: 01°08′0″S 79°04′0″W
- Country: Ecuador
- Province: Cotopaxi Province
- Capital: El Corazón

Area
  - Total: 720.4 km^{2} (278.1 sq mi)

Population (2022 census)
  - Total: 21,867
  - Density: 30.35/km^{2} (78.62/sq mi)
- Time zone: UTC-5 (ECT)

Pangua Canton is a canton of Ecuador, located in the Cotopaxi Province. Its capital is the town of El Corazón. Its population at the 2001 census was 19,877.

== Demographics ==
Ethnic groups as of the Ecuadorian census of 2010:

- Mestizo 76.8%
- Indigenous 10.0%
- Montubio 8.8%
- White 2.8%
- Afro-Ecuadorian 1.5%
- Other 0.1%
