= Latacunga Canton =

- Canton
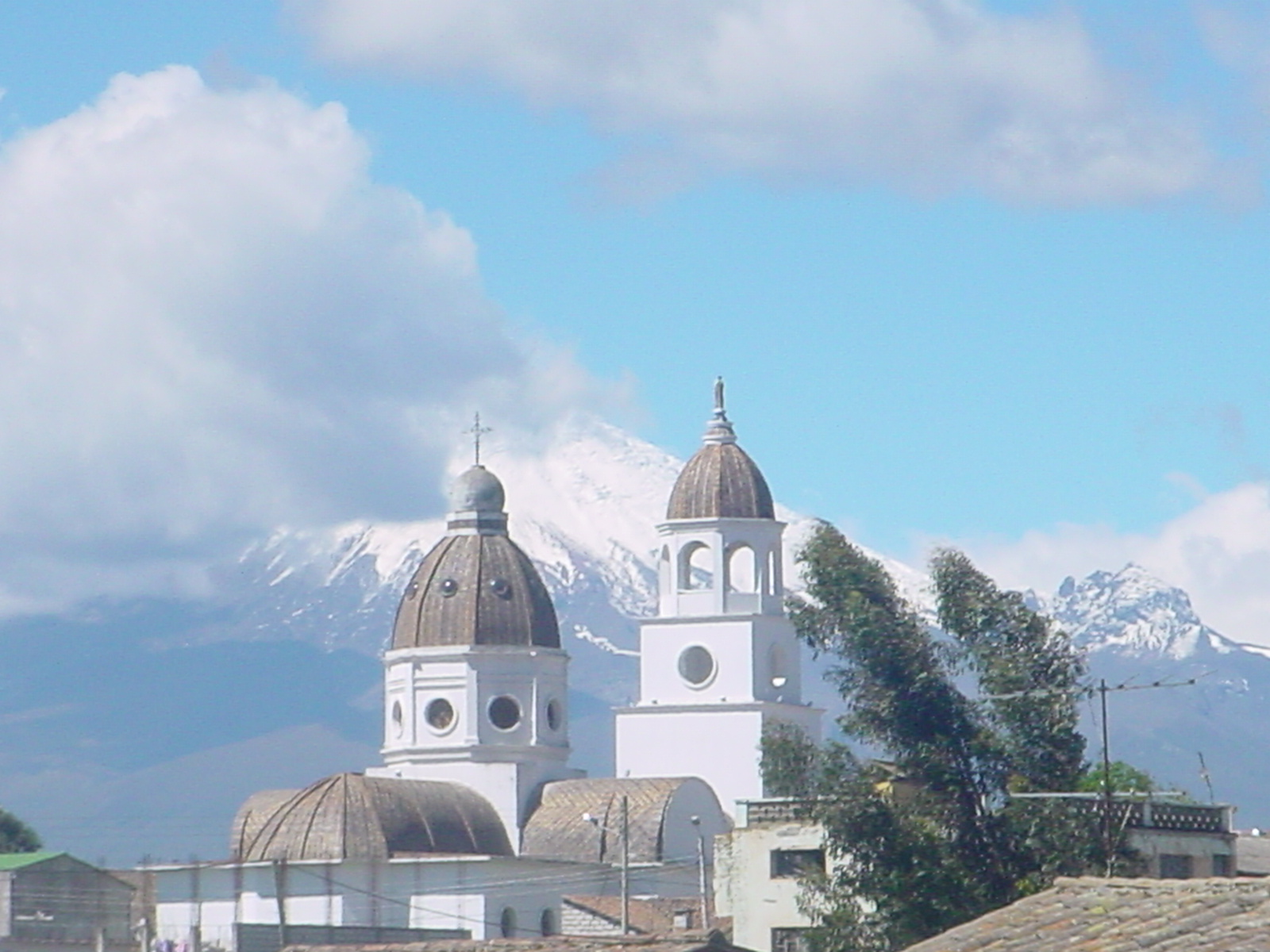
- Guaytacama with Cotopaxi volcano in the background

- Latacunga Canton in Cotopaxi Province

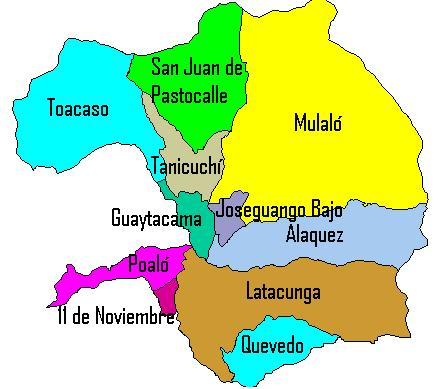
- Parishes of Latacunga Canton
- Coordinates: 0°56′S 78°37′W
- Country: Ecuador
- Province: Cotopaxi Province
- Capital: Latacunga

Area
  - Total: 1,494 km^{2} (577 sq mi)

Population (2022 census)
  - Total: 217,261
  - Density: 145.4/km^{2} (376.6/sq mi)
- Time zone: UTC-5 (ECT)

Latacunga Canton is one of seven cantons of the Cotopaxi Province in Ecuador. Its population at the 2001 census was 143,979. Its capital is the town of Latacunga.

== Subdivision ==
The capital of the canton consists of the following urban parishes: Eloy Alfaro (San Felipe), Ignacio Flores (La Laguna), Juan Montalvo (San Sebastián), La Matríz, San Buenaventura.

The canton is divided into the following rural parishes:

- Toacaso
- San Juan de Pastocalle
- Mulaló
- Tanicuchí
- Guaytacama
- Alaques
- Poaló
- Once de Noviembre
- Belisario Quevedo
- Joseguango Bajo

== Demographics ==
Ethnic groups as of the Ecuadorian census of 2010:

- Mestizo 86.4%
- Indigenous 8.5%
- White 2.7%
- Afro-Ecuadorian 1.5%
- Montubio 0.7%
- Other 0.1%

== Climate ==
Climate data for Latacunga, elevation 2,785 m (9,137 ft), (1971–2000)
| Month | Jan | Feb | Mar | Apr | May | Jun | Jul | Aug | Sep | Oct | Nov | Dec | Year |
|---|---|---|---|---|---|---|---|---|---|---|---|---|---|
| Mean daily maximum °C (°F) | 20.3 (68.5) | 19.9 (67.8) | 19.2 (66.6) | 19.2 (66.6) | 19.0 (66.2) | 18.0 (64.4) | 18.0 (64.4) | 18.4 (65.1) | 19.1 (66.4) | 20.0 (68.0) | 20.5 (68.9) | 20.4 (68.7) | 19.3 (66.8) |
| Mean daily minimum °C (°F) | 7.9 (46.2) | 7.2 (45.0) | 8.2 (46.8) | 8.5 (47.3) | 8.2 (46.8) | 7.3 (45.1) | 7.1 (44.8) | 6.5 (43.7) | 6.7 (44.1) | 7.2 (45.0) | 7.2 (45.0) | 7.5 (45.5) | 7.5 (45.4) |
| Average precipitation mm (inches) | 30.0 (1.18) | 53.0 (2.09) | 54.0 (2.13) | 66.0 (2.60) | 40.0 (1.57) | 28.0 (1.10) | 15.0 (0.59) | 15.0 (0.59) | 25.0 (0.98) | 55.0 (2.17) | 52.0 (2.05) | 42.0 (1.65) | 475 (18.7) |
| Average relative humidity (%) | 72 | 73 | 76 | 77 | 76 | 77 | 76 | 74 | 73 | 73 | 72 | 70 | 74 |
Source: FAO

Climate data for Cotopaxi-Minitrack Station, elevation 3,590 m (11,780 ft), (1971–2000)
| Month | Jan | Feb | Mar | Apr | May | Jun | Jul | Aug | Sep | Oct | Nov | Dec | Year |
|---|---|---|---|---|---|---|---|---|---|---|---|---|---|
| Mean daily maximum °C (°F) | 13.8 (56.8) | 13.6 (56.5) | 13.4 (56.1) | 13.8 (56.8) | 13.5 (56.3) | 13.6 (56.5) | 13.5 (56.3) | 13.7 (56.7) | 14.0 (57.2) | 13.9 (57.0) | 14.1 (57.4) | 14.2 (57.6) | 13.8 (56.8) |
| Mean daily minimum °C (°F) | 3.0 (37.4) | 3.2 (37.8) | 3.5 (38.3) | 3.5 (38.3) | 3.4 (38.1) | 2.8 (37.0) | 2.4 (36.3) | 2.2 (36.0) | 2.4 (36.3) | 2.8 (37.0) | 2.8 (37.0) | 3.0 (37.4) | 2.9 (37.2) |
| Average precipitation mm (inches) | 90.0 (3.54) | 102.0 (4.02) | 138.0 (5.43) | 137.0 (5.39) | 120.0 (4.72) | 76.0 (2.99) | 45.0 (1.77) | 43.0 (1.69) | 78.0 (3.07) | 108.0 (4.25) | 95.0 (3.74) | 86.0 (3.39) | 1,118 (44) |
| Average relative humidity (%) | 88 | 88 | 88 | 90 | 88 | 89 | 86 | 84 | 84 | 86 | 86 | 89 | 87 |
Source: FAO
