= Pujilí Canton =

- Canton
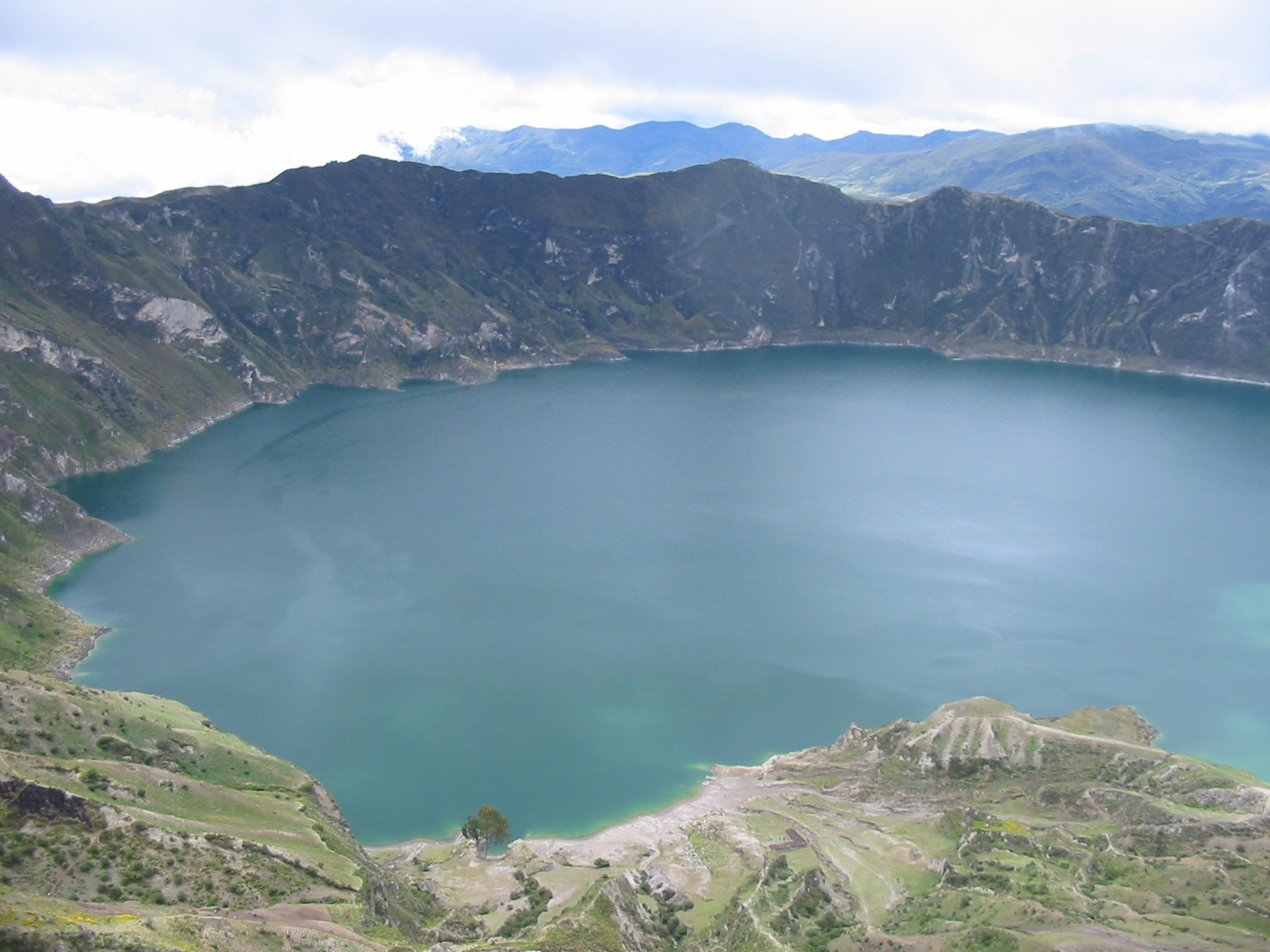
- Quilotoa, Pujilí Canton

- Pujilí Canton in Cotopaxi Province

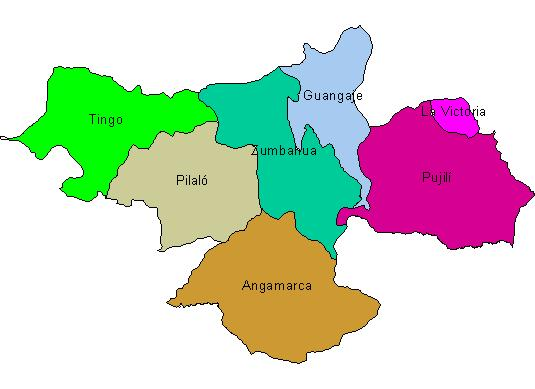
- Parishes of Pujilí Canton
- Coordinates: 0°57′0″S 78°41′24″W
- Country: Ecuador
- Province: Cotopaxi Province
- Capital: Pujilí

Area
  - Total: 1,329 km^{2} (513 sq mi)

Population (2022 census)
  - Total: 66,980
  - Density: 50.40/km^{2} (130.5/sq mi)
- Time zone: UTC-5 (ECT)
- Website: municipiopujili.gob.ec

Pujilí Canton is one of seven cantons of the Cotopaxi Province in Ecuador. Its population at the 2001 census was 60,728. Its capital is the town of Pujilí.

== Subdivision ==
The canton is divided into seven parishes, one urban parish, Pujilí, and six rural ones:

- Angamarca
- Guangaje
- La Victoria
- Pílalo
- Tingo
- Zumbahua
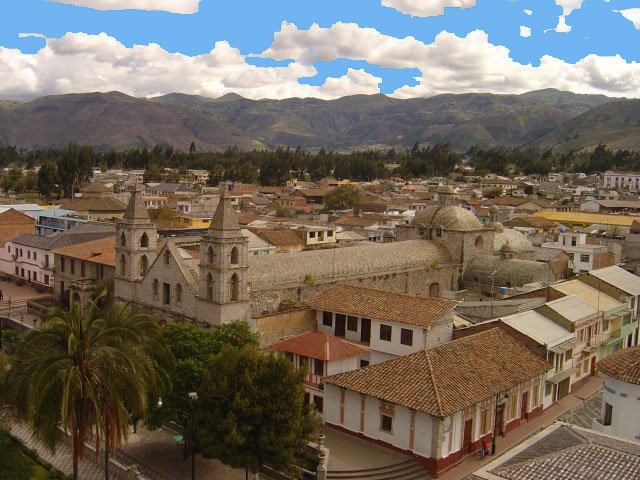
Pujilí

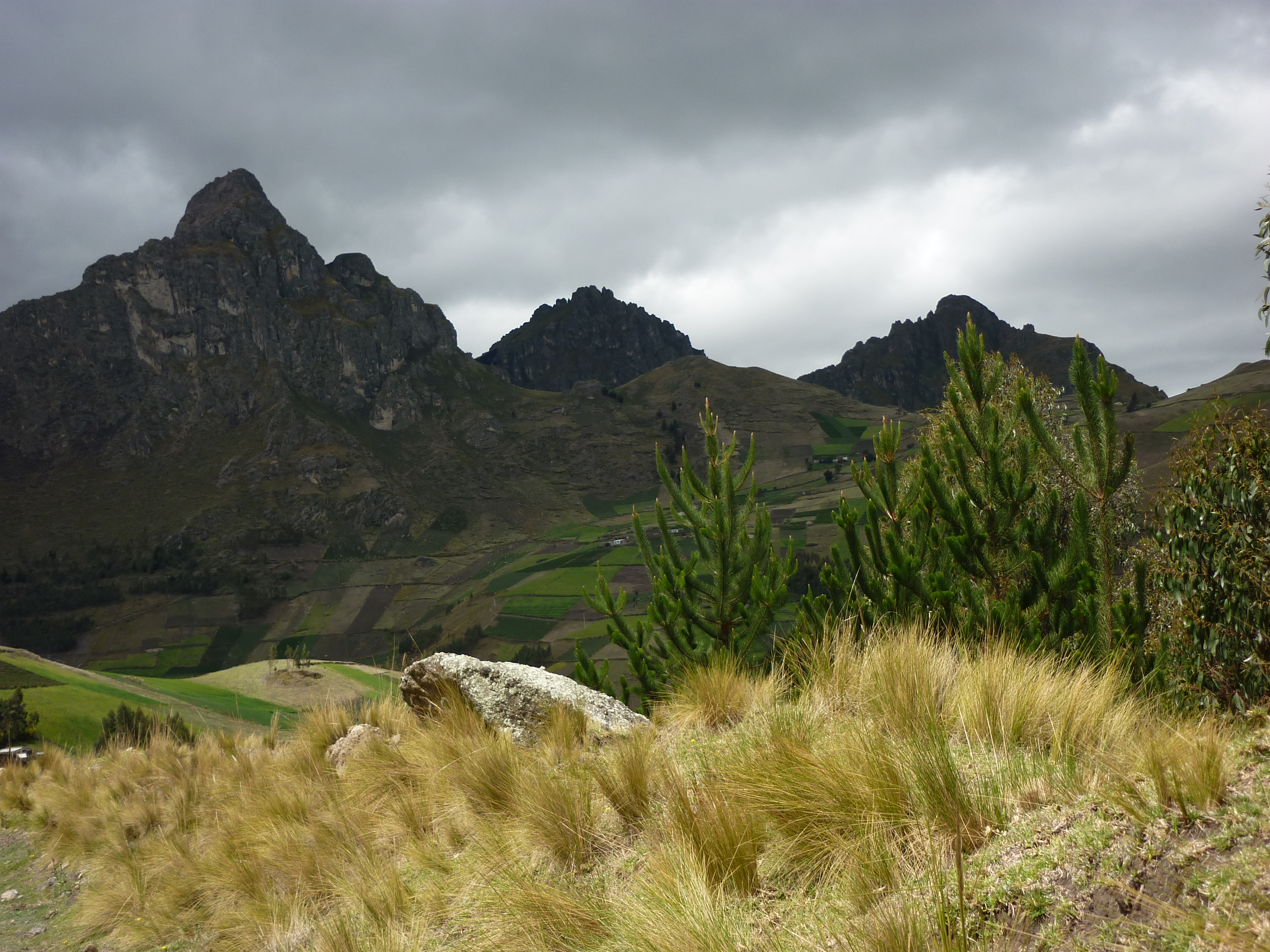
Mountains of Zumbahua

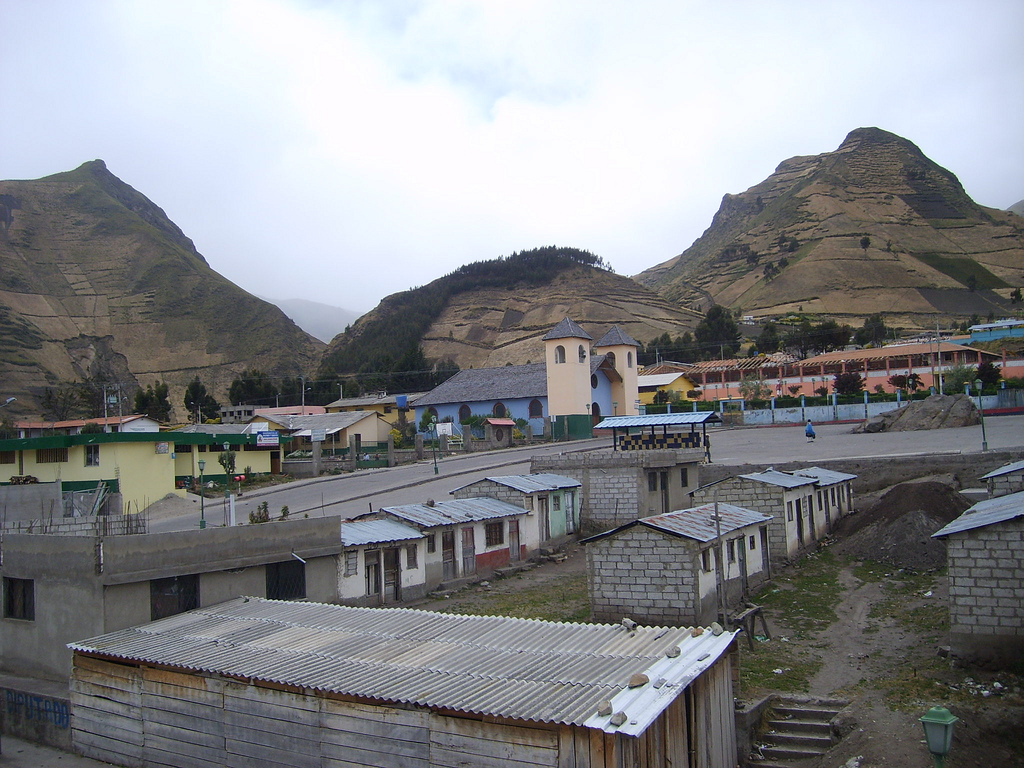
Zumbahua

== Demographics ==
Ethnic groups as of the Ecuadorian census of 2010:

- Indigenous 51.8%
- Mestizo 46.1%
- White 1.0%
- Afro-Ecuadorian 0.6%
- Montubio 0.5%
- Other 0.1%

== Climate ==
Climate data for Pílalo, elevation 2,500 m (8,200 ft), (1961–1990)
Month	Jan	Feb	Mar	Apr	May	Jun	Jul	Aug	Sep	Oct	Nov	Dec	Year
Mean daily maximum °C (°F)	15.8 (60.4)	16.0 (60.8)	16.0 (60.8)	16.2 (61.2)	16.6 (61.9)	16.5 (61.7)	16.7 (62.1)	16.6 (61.9)	16.7 (62.1)	16.7 (62.1)	16.5 (61.7)	16.2 (61.2)	16.4 (61.5)
Daily mean °C (°F)	12.3 (54.1)	12.5 (54.5)	12.6 (54.7)	12.8 (55.0)	12.8 (55.0)	12.5 (54.5)	12.3 (54.1)	12.3 (54.1)	12.3 (54.1)	12.5 (54.5)	12.5 (54.5)	12.3 (54.1)	12.5 (54.4)
Mean daily minimum °C (°F)	10.8 (51.4)	9.1 (48.4)	9.3 (48.7)	9.1 (48.4)	9.1 (48.4)	8.6 (47.5)	7.5 (45.5)	8.0 (46.4)	8.3 (46.9)	8.6 (47.5)	7.9 (46.2)	8.8 (47.8)	8.8 (47.8)
Average precipitation mm (inches)	223.0 (8.78)	257.0 (10.12)	281.0 (11.06)	186.0 (7.32)	93.0 (3.66)	44.0 (1.73)	19.0 (0.75)	16.0 (0.63)	57.0 (2.24)	119.0 (4.69)	76.0 (2.99)	112.0 (4.41)	1,483 (58.38)
Source: FAO
