= El Corazón, Cotopaxi =

El Corazón
- Location within Ecuador
- Coordinates: 01°08′0″S 79°04′0″W
- Country: Ecuador
- Province: Cotopaxi Province
- Canton: Pangua Canton

Government
  - Mayor: Milton Ruben Carrillo Salazar

Area
  - Total: 0.83 km^{2} (0.32 sq mi)

Population (2022 census)
  - Total: 1,872
  - Density: 2,300/km^{2} (5,800/sq mi)
- Time zone: ECT
- Website: panguacorazon.com

El Corazón is a location in the Cotopaxi Province, Ecuador. It is the seat of the Pangua Canton.

== Climate ==
Climate data for El Corazón, elevation 1,500 m (4,900 ft), (1961–1990)
Month	Jan	Feb	Mar	Apr	May	Jun	Jul	Aug	Sep	Oct	Nov	Dec	Year
Mean daily maximum °C (°F)	19.7 (67.5)	20.1 (68.2)	20.2 (68.4)	21.2 (70.2)	21.2 (70.2)	20.7 (69.3)	21.3 (70.3)	22.2 (72.0)	22.5 (72.5)	21.7 (71.1)	21.5 (70.7)	20.7 (69.3)	21.1 (70.0)
Daily mean °C (°F)	17.2 (63.0)	17.2 (63.0)	17.6 (63.7)	17.7 (63.9)	17.8 (64.0)	17.7 (63.9)	17.8 (64.0)	17.8 (64.0)	18.0 (64.4)	17.8 (64.0)	17.7 (63.9)	17.3 (63.1)	17.6 (63.7)
Mean daily minimum °C (°F)	14.6 (58.3)	14.8 (58.6)	14.8 (58.6)	15.0 (59.0)	14.8 (58.6)	14.1 (57.4)	13.8 (56.8)	13.3 (55.9)	13.6 (56.5)	14.0 (57.2)	13.6 (56.5)	14.1 (57.4)	14.2 (57.6)
Average precipitation mm (inches)	421.0 (16.57)	376.0 (14.80)	437.0 (17.20)	450.0 (17.72)	261.0 (10.28)	116.0 (4.57)	33.0 (1.30)	23.0 (0.91)	60.0 (2.36)	59.0 (2.32)	89.0 (3.50)	215.0 (8.46)	2,540 (99.99)
Source: FAO
