= Salcedo Canton =

- Canton
- Salcedo Canton in Cotopaxi Province

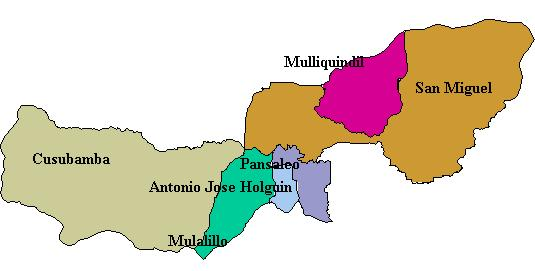
- Parishes of Salcedo Canton
- Coordinates: 1°3′0″S 78°35′0″W
- Country: Ecuador
- Province: Cotopaxi Province
- Capital: San Miguel de Salcedo

Area
  - Total: 468.1 km^{2} (180.7 sq mi)

Population (2022 census)
  - Total: 67,493
  - Density: 144.2/km^{2} (373.4/sq mi)
- Time zone: UTC-5 (ECT)

Salcedo is a canton in the Cotopaxi Province, Ecuador. in 2022 it had a population of 67,493. The capital of the canton is San Miguel de Salcedo.

Salcedo is famous for its ice cream. Salecdo is a canton that has 6 parroquias Cusubamba, Santa Lucia, Mulalillo, Mulliquindil, Panzaleo and the main parroquia is San Miguel the canton is 484 sq kilometers 300 sq miles the canton is in southern Cotopaxi province.

== Demographics ==
Ethnic groups as of the Ecuadorian census of 2010:

- Mestizo 68.6%
- Indigenous 27.9%
- White 2.0%
- Afro-Ecuadorian 1.1%
- Montubio 0.4%
- Other 0.0%
