= Cotopaxi Province =

Province of Ecuador

Cotopaxi
- Province
- Province of Cotopaxi
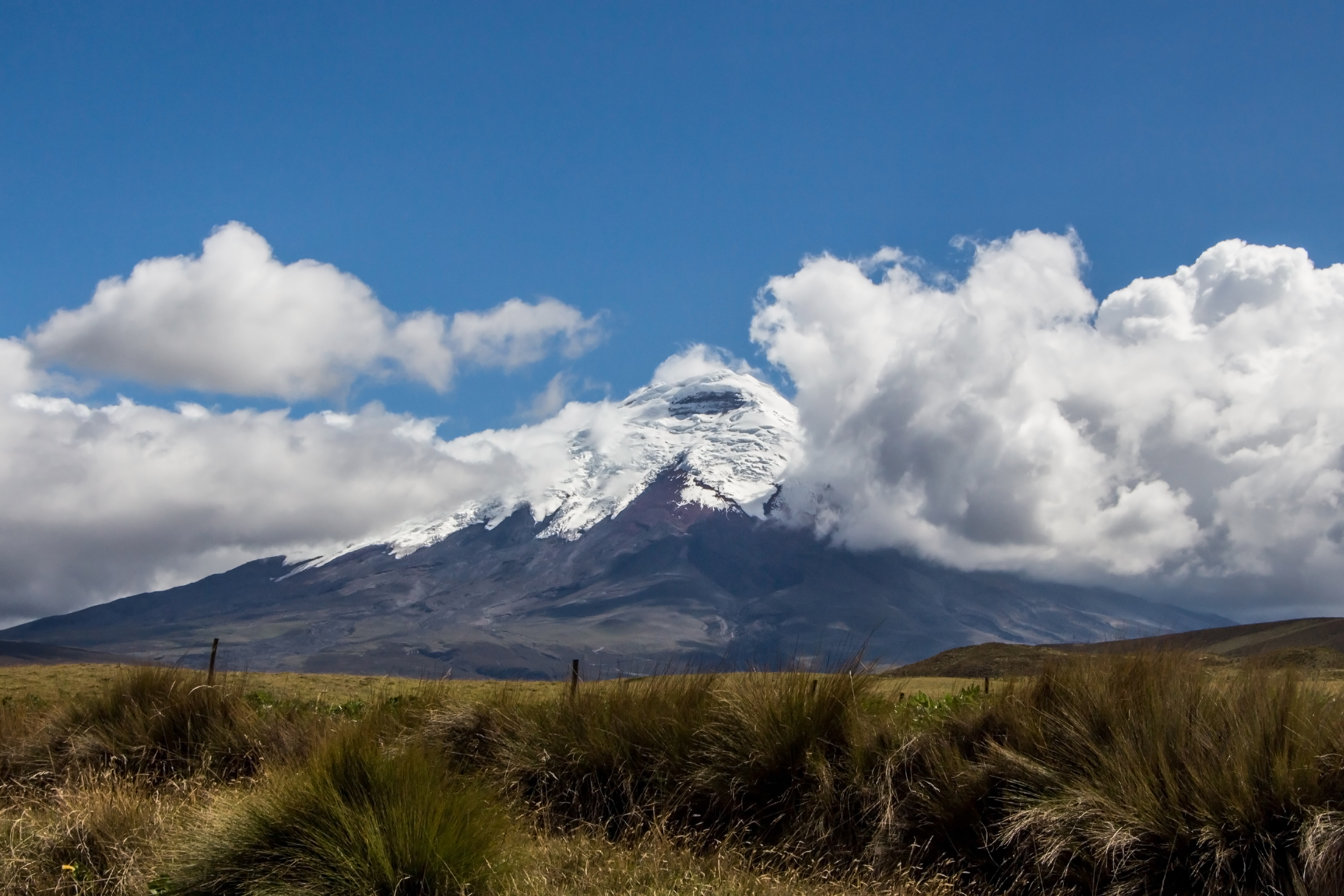
- Cotopaxi National Park

- Flag

- Location of Cotopaxi in Ecuador

- Cantons of Cotopaxi Province
- Coordinates: 0°56′S 78°37′W
- Country: Ecuador
- Capital: Latacunga
- Cantons: List of Cantons: La Maná; Latacunga; Pangua; Pujilí; Salcedo; Saquisilí; Sigchos

Government
  - Prefect: Lourdes Tibán (MUPP)
  - Vice Prefect: Alejandro Plazarte
  - Governor: Nelson Sánchez

Area
  - Total: 6,185 km^{2} (2,388 sq mi)

Population (2022 census)
  - Total: 470,210
  - Density: 76.02/km^{2} (196.9/sq mi)
- Vehicle registration: X
- HDI (2017): 0.722 high · 15th
- Website: www.cotopaxi.gov.ec

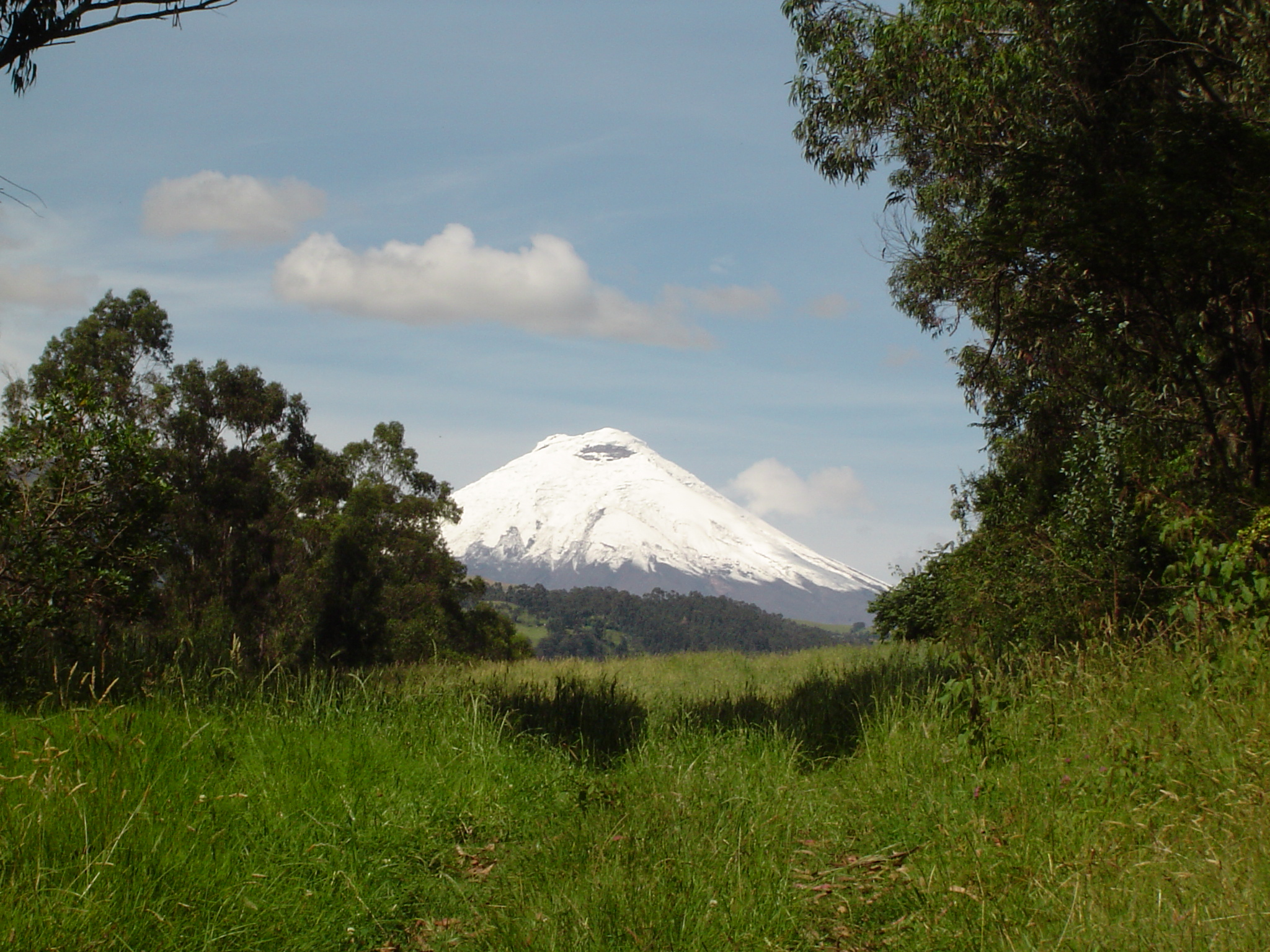

Cotopaxi (Spanish pronunciation: [kotoˈpaɣsi]) is one of the provinces of Ecuador. The capital is Latacunga. The province contains the Cotopaxi volcano, an intermittent volcano with a height of 19,347 feet (5,897 m).

== Cantons ==
The province is divided into 7 cantons. The following table lists each canton with its population (per the 2001 census), its area in square kilometres (km^{2}), and the name of the canton seat (capital).

Canton	Pop. (2019)	Area (km^{2})	Seat/Capital
La Maná	55,500	647	La Maná
Latacunga	202,880	1,377	Latacunga
Pangua	24,470	715	El Corazón
Pujilí	79,060	1,289	Pujilí
Salcedo	66,520	484	Salcedo
Saquisilí	30,910	206	Saquisilí
Sigchos	23,280	1,267	Sigchos

== Demographics ==
Ethnic groups as of the Ecuadorian census of 2010:

- Mestizo 72.1%
- Indigenous 22.1%
- White 2.3%
- Montubio 1.8%
- Afro-Ecuadorian 1.7%
- Other 0.1%

== See also ==
- Cotopaxi National Park
- Llanganates National Park
- Panzaleo (ethnic group)
- Provinces of Ecuador
- Cantons of Ecuador
- Centro de Levantamientos Integrados de Recursos Naturales por Sensores Remotos
