= List of moths of Australia (Immidae) =

Partial list of Australian moths

This is a list of the Australian moth species of the family Immidae. It also acts as an index to the species articles and forms part of the full List of moths of Australia.

- Birthana cleis (R. Felder & Rogenhofer, 1875)
- Imma acosma (Turner, 1900)
- Imma albifasciella (Pagenstecher, 1900)
- Imma lichneopa (Lower, 1903)
- Imma loxoscia Turner, 1913
- Imma lyrifera Meyrick, 1910
- Imma marileutis Meyrick, 1906
- Imma melanosphena Meyrick, 1918
- Imma platyxantha Turner, 1913
- Imma stilbiota (Lower, 1903)
- Imma tetrascia Meyrick, 1912
- Imma vaticina Meyrick, 1912
- Imma xanthosticha (Turner, 1936)
