= Imma paratma =

Scientific classification
- Kingdom: Animalia
- Phylum: Arthropoda
- Class: Insecta
- Order: Lepidoptera
- Family: Immidae
- Genus: Imma
- Species: I. paratma

Binomial name
- Imma paratma Meyrick, 1912

Species of moth

Imma paratma is a moth in the family Immidae. It was described by Edward Meyrick in 1912. It is found in Guyana.

The wingspan is 17–18 mm. The forewings are dark fuscous, irregularly finely sprinkled with ochreous whitish, the discal area anteriorly lighter and more brownish. The hindwings are dark fuscous, anteriorly rather thinly scaled with undefined patches of fuscous-whitish suffusion extending over the upper and lower margins of the cell, the veins in these dark fuscous.
