= Imma chloromelalis =

Scientific classification
- Kingdom: Animalia
- Phylum: Arthropoda
- Class: Insecta
- Order: Lepidoptera
- Family: Immidae
- Genus: Imma
- Species: I. chloromelalis

Binomial name
- Imma chloromelalis (Walker, [1866])

Synonyms
- Aglossa chloromelalis Walker, [1866]

Species of moth

Imma chloromelalis is a moth in the family Immidae. It was described by Francis Walker in 1866. It is found in Brazil.

Adults are dark reddish brown, silvery cinereous beneath. The forewings are slightly rounded at the tips, with some green speckles, most of which form three very incomplete bands. The costa is hardly convex, while the exterior border is convex and hardly oblique. The hindwings are brown.
