= Imma nephelastra =

Scientific classification
- Kingdom: Animalia
- Phylum: Arthropoda
- Class: Insecta
- Order: Lepidoptera
- Family: Immidae
- Genus: Imma
- Species: I. nephelastra

Binomial name
- Imma nephelastra Meyrick, 1906

Species of moth

Imma nephelastra is a moth in the family Immidae. It was described by Edward Meyrick in 1906. It is found on Borneo.

The wingspan is about 18 mm. The forewings are blackish fuscous, with pale ochreous markings, cloudy and ill defined. There is a short longitudinal streak from the base in the middle and a small spot beneath the costa at one-sixth, and one on the dorsum at one-fourth, as well as an incurved transverse spot in the disc at one-third, nearly reaching the costa but not nearly the dorsum. A moderate roundish spot is found on the costa beyond the middle, another towards the dorsum at two-thirds, and a third in the disc at three-fourths. A narrower transverse spot is found on the costa at four-fifths, and there are very indistinct marks above the tornus and towards the middle of the termen. The hindwings are dark fuscous, more thinly scaled towards the base, with two or three undefined semitransparent streaks towards the dorsum.
