= Imma quadrivittana =

Scientific classification
- Domain: Eukaryota
- Kingdom: Animalia
- Phylum: Arthropoda
- Class: Insecta
- Order: Lepidoptera
- Family: Immidae
- Genus: Imma
- Species: I. quadrivittana

Binomial name
- Imma quadrivittana (Walker, 1863)

Synonyms
- Gauris quadrivittana Walker, 1863

Species of moth

Imma quadrivittana is a moth in the family Immidae. It was described by Francis Walker in 1863. It is found in Brazil.

Adults are dark blackish purple, the wings elongate, with a cinereous fringe. The forewings are rectangular at the tips, with some ochraceous streaks near the base and with a submarginal band of ochraceous streaks. There is an ochraceous spot on the middle of the costa, and a larger hindward forked ochraceous spot in the middle of the disk. The costa is straight and the exterior border is oblique hindward. The hindwings are blackish brown, with a small yellow spot in the middle of the disk.
