= Imma cymbalodes =

Scientific classification
- Kingdom: Animalia
- Phylum: Arthropoda
- Class: Insecta
- Order: Lepidoptera
- Family: Immidae
- Genus: Imma
- Species: I. cymbalodes

Binomial name
- Imma cymbalodes Meyrick, 1906

Species of moth

Imma cymbalodes is a moth in the family Immidae. It was described by Edward Meyrick in 1906. It is found in Assam, India.

The wingspan is 18–21 mm. The forewings are rather dark ochreous fuscous with an ochreous-yellow basal patch occupying two-fifths of the wing, the base partially suffused with fuscous, the outer edge straight. An ochreous-yellowish dot is found on the costa at two-thirds and there is an indistinct streak of ochreous-yellowish suffusion around the apex. The hindwings are dark fuscous.
