= Alampla palaeodes =

Scientific classification
- Kingdom: Animalia
- Phylum: Arthropoda
- Clade: Pancrustacea
- Class: Insecta
- Order: Lepidoptera
- Family: Immidae
- Genus: Alampla
- Species: A. palaeodes

Binomial name
- Alampla palaeodes (Meyrick, 1914)

Synonyms
- Imma palaeodes Meyrick, 1914; Heliothela cretostrigalis Caradja, 1925

Species of moth

Alampla palaeodes is a moth in the family Immidae. It was described by Edward Meyrick in 1914. It is found in Taiwan and Guangdong, China.
