= Imma hectaea =

Scientific classification
- Kingdom: Animalia
- Phylum: Arthropoda
- Class: Insecta
- Order: Lepidoptera
- Family: Immidae
- Genus: Imma
- Species: I. hectaea

Binomial name
- Imma hectaea Meyrick, 1906

Species of moth

Imma hectaea is a moth in the family Immidae. It was described by Edward Meyrick in 1906. It is found on Borneo.

The wingspan is about 17 mm. The forewings are blackish with a moderate ochreous-yellow streak from the base below the middle of the disc to two-fifths and a slightly curved ochreous-yellow fascia from the middle of the costa, broadest on the costa and at three-fourths, constricted above the middle, not quite reaching the dorsum at two-thirds. The hindwings are dark fuscous, with thinly scaled lighter elongate patches along the dorsum and in the anterior portion of the disc.
