= Imma niphopelta =

Scientific classification
- Kingdom: Animalia
- Phylum: Arthropoda
- Class: Insecta
- Order: Lepidoptera
- Family: Immidae
- Genus: Imma
- Species: I. niphopelta

Binomial name
- Imma niphopelta Meyrick, 1930

Species of moth

Imma niphopelta is a moth of the family Immidae. It is found in New Guinea.

== Subspecies ==
- Imma niphopelta niphopelta
- Imma niphopelta lutescens Diakonoff, 1955
