= Imma panopta =

Scientific classification
- Kingdom: Animalia
- Phylum: Arthropoda
- Class: Insecta
- Order: Lepidoptera
- Family: Immidae
- Genus: Imma
- Species: I. panopta

Binomial name
- Imma panopta Meyrick, 1906

Species of moth

Imma panopta is a moth in the family Immidae. It was described by Edward Meyrick in 1906. It is found on Flores.

The wingspan is 34–40 mm. The forewings are blackish fuscous, slightly purplish tinged. There is an orange median band, greatly dilated downwards, the anterior edge running from one-fourth of the costa to one-fourth of the dorsum, straight, somewhat irregular, the posterior edge running from before the middle of the costa to three-fourths of the dorsum, twice curved outwards above and below the middle. The hindwings are blackish fuscous with a rather irregular orange blotch resting on the median third of the costa, narrowed downwards, reaching more than halfway across the wing.
