= Imma dedicata =

Scientific classification
- Domain: Eukaryota
- Kingdom: Animalia
- Phylum: Arthropoda
- Class: Insecta
- Order: Lepidoptera
- Family: Immidae
- Genus: Imma
- Species: I. dedicata

Binomial name
- Imma dedicata Meyrick, 1925

Species of moth

Imma dedicata is a moth in the family Immidae. It was described by Edward Meyrick in 1925. It is found in India.

The wingspan is about 17 mm. The forewings are rather dark fuscous with an irregular transverse ochreous-whitish blotch on the middle of the costa, with short projections in the middle of the anterior edge and downward from the anterior angle, the posterior angle triangularly prominent. There is a dot towards the fold beneath this and a small ochreous-whitish spot on the costa just before the apex, as well as some faint minute whitish terminal dots. The hindwings are rather dark grey.
