= Imma porpanthes =

Scientific classification
- Kingdom: Animalia
- Phylum: Arthropoda
- Class: Insecta
- Order: Lepidoptera
- Family: Immidae
- Genus: Imma
- Species: I. porpanthes

Binomial name
- Imma porpanthes Meyrick, 1906

Species of moth

Imma porpanthes is a moth in the family Immidae. It was described by Edward Meyrick in 1906. It is found in Perak, Malaysia.

The wingspan is about 24 mm. The forewings are rather dark fuscous, tinged anteriorly with purplish, posteriorly with ochreous. The markings are pale ochreous yellowish, and there is a small irregular basal spot and three others in a subbasal transverse series. A narrow irregular fascia is found from two-fifths of the costa to near the dorsum beyond the middle, interrupted in the middle. A triangular spot is found on the costa at four-fifths, and there is a small round spot near the termen beneath the apex and a transverse spot near the termen below the middle. The hindwings are dark fuscous.
