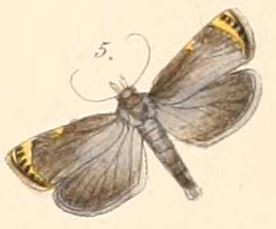

Scientific classification
- Domain: Eukaryota
- Kingdom: Animalia
- Phylum: Arthropoda
- Class: Insecta
- Order: Lepidoptera
- Family: Immidae
- Genus: Imma
- Species: I. costipuncta

Binomial name
- Imma costipuncta (Felder & Rogenhofer, 1874)

Synonyms
- Tortricomorpha costipuncta Felder & Rogenhofer, 1874

= Imma costipuncta =

Species of moth

Imma costipuncta is a moth of the family Immidae. It is known from Ambon Island of Indonesia.

The wingspan is 20–21 mm. The forewings are rather dark fuscous, slightly purplish-tinged and with a hardly darker cloudy discal dot at three-fifths and a whitish-ochreous triangular dot on the costa beyond the middle. There is a whitish-ochreous streak from the costa before the apex to the termen above the tornus, triangularly dilated towards the costa, confluent at the extremities with a toothed whitish-ochreous line along the termen. The hindwings are fuscous.
