= Imma dipselia =

Scientific classification
- Kingdom: Animalia
- Phylum: Arthropoda
- Class: Insecta
- Order: Lepidoptera
- Family: Immidae
- Genus: Imma
- Species: I. dipselia

Binomial name
- Imma dipselia Meyrick, 1906

Species of moth

Imma dipselia is a moth in the family Immidae. It was described by Edward Meyrick in 1906. It is found on the Sulu Archipelago in the southwestern Philippines.

The wingspan is about 26 mm. The forewings are fuscous, slightly ochreous tinged and with a whitish-ochreous somewhat irregular line from the middle of the costa to two-thirds of the dorsum, faintly bent in the disc. A whitish-ochreous waved line is found from the costa before the apex to the termen above the tornus, dilated on the costa. The hindwings have median and submedian grooves. They are dark fuscous, but lighter towards the base.
