= Imma flammula =

Scientific classification
- Domain: Eukaryota
- Kingdom: Animalia
- Phylum: Arthropoda
- Class: Insecta
- Order: Lepidoptera
- Family: Immidae
- Genus: Imma
- Species: I. flammula

Binomial name
- Imma flammula Diakonoff, 1978

Species of moth

Imma flammula is a moth in the family Immidae. It was described by Alexey Diakonoff in 1978. It is found in Nepal.

The wingspan is 13–16 mm.
