= Imma infima =

Scientific classification
- Kingdom: Animalia
- Phylum: Arthropoda
- Class: Insecta
- Order: Lepidoptera
- Family: Immidae
- Genus: Imma
- Species: I. infima

Binomial name
- Imma infima Meyrick, 1930

Species of moth

Imma infima is a moth in the family Immidae. It was described by Edward Meyrick in 1930. It is found on the Comoros, Mauritius, Réunion and in Sierra Leone.

The larvae have been recorded feeding on Agarista salicifolia.

== Subspecies ==
- Imma infima infima
- Imma infima borbonensis Viette, 1988 (Réunion)
