= Imma uranitis =

Scientific classification
- Kingdom: Animalia
- Phylum: Arthropoda
- Class: Insecta
- Order: Lepidoptera
- Family: Immidae
- Genus: Imma
- Species: I. uranitis

Binomial name
- Imma uranitis Meyrick, 1910

Species of moth

Imma uranitis is a moth in the family Immidae. It was described by Edward Meyrick in 1910. It is found on Sulawesi in Indonesia.

The wingspan is 25–26 mm. The forewings are dark fuscous, slightly purplish tinged and with a moderate ochreous-yellow rather oblique median fascia. There is a triangular ochreous-yellow spot on the costa before the apex and a very fine irregular ochreous-whitish line along the upper part of the termen. The hindwings are dark fuscous with a large undefined lighter patch occupying most of the disc, with strong bright blue reflections.
