= Imma cancanopis =

Scientific classification
- Kingdom: Animalia
- Phylum: Arthropoda
- Class: Insecta
- Order: Lepidoptera
- Family: Immidae
- Genus: Imma
- Species: I. cancanopis

Binomial name
- Imma cancanopis Meyrick, 1906

Species of moth

Imma cancanopis is a moth in the family Immidae. It was described by Edward Meyrick in 1906. It is found in Colombia and French Guiana.

The wingspan is 25–26 mm. The forewings are purplish fuscous, more purplish in males, irregularly sprinkled with blue grey whitish, with dark fuscous streaks on the veins broken up into short dashes arranged in irregular transverse series. The whitish irroration (sprinkling) tends to form series of undefined marks between these. There is a black dash beneath the costa from the base, edged beneath with ochreous white. A pale waved terminal line, is preceded by indistinct dark dots. The hindwings are dark fuscous.
