= Imma hemixanthella =

Scientific classification
- Domain: Eukaryota
- Kingdom: Animalia
- Phylum: Arthropoda
- Class: Insecta
- Order: Lepidoptera
- Family: Immidae
- Genus: Imma
- Species: I. hemixanthella

Binomial name
- Imma hemixanthella (Holland, 1900)

Synonyms
- Tortricomorpha hemixanthella Holland, 1900

Species of moth

Imma hemixanthella is a moth in the family Immidae. It was described by William Jacob Holland in 1900. It is found on Buru in Indonesia.

The wingspan is about 20 mm. The forewings are broadly pale yellow from the base to beyond the middle, they are then broadly purplish brown. The line of demarcation between the yellow and the brown is sharply defined by a straight line running from the costa to the inner margin a little before the inner angle. The costa near the apex is marked by yellow of the same shade as the basal half of the wing, the yellow widening toward the outer margin and covering the entire apex. The fringes are dark brown, their origin being accentuated by a series of minute yellow dots. The hindwings are uniformly dark brown. On the underside, both wings are pale brown, slightly lighter on the inner margin, with traces of an obscure whitish median transverse band on the forewings.
