= Imma nephallactis =

Scientific classification
- Kingdom: Animalia
- Phylum: Arthropoda
- Class: Insecta
- Order: Lepidoptera
- Family: Immidae
- Genus: Imma
- Species: I. nephallactis

Binomial name
- Imma nephallactis Meyrick, 1906

Species of moth

Imma nephallactis is a moth in the family Immidae. It was described by Edward Meyrick in 1906. It is found in Venezuela.

The wingspan is 17–20 mm. The forewings are grey or fuscous sometimes variably sprinkled or suffused with white, sometimes strongly violet tinged. There is a black variably interrupted line beneath the costa from the base to the middle, edged beneath anteriorly by a fine pale yellowish line, and a dark fuscous or blackish costal spot at one-fourth, and sometimes one near the base, sometimes confluent. A thick irregular dentate dark fuscous line runs from this spot, not reaching the dorsum, usually cut by a fine white line on the submedian fold and there is a dark fuscous or blackish transverse mark in the disc at two-thirds, terminating beneath in a round suffused spot, and two spots on the costa before the middle and at two-thirds separated by a white space, the whole sometimes merged into a large semi-oval dark fuscous costal blotch reaching two-thirds of the way across the wing. There are two or three dark fuscous subdorsal marks and a series of dark fuscous or blackish marks from four-fifths of the costa to the tornus, angulated above the middle, where there is a larger spot, and sometimes a dark fuscous streak running from the discal mark through the angle to the termen. A waved-dentate pale terminal line is preceded by a dark fuscous shade. The hindwings are rather darker posteriorly, especially in males.
