= Imma torophracta =

Scientific classification
- Kingdom: Animalia
- Phylum: Arthropoda
- Class: Insecta
- Order: Lepidoptera
- Family: Immidae
- Genus: Imma
- Species: I. torophracta

Binomial name
- Imma torophracta Meyrick, 1935

Synonyms
- Imma hoenei Caradja, 1938

Species of moth

Imma torophracta is a moth in the family Immidae. It was described by Edward Meyrick in 1935. It is found in Hunan, China.
