= Imma asaphoneura =

Scientific classification
- Kingdom: Animalia
- Phylum: Arthropoda
- Class: Insecta
- Order: Lepidoptera
- Family: Immidae
- Genus: Imma
- Species: I. asaphoneura

Binomial name
- Imma asaphoneura Meyrick, 1934

Species of moth

Imma asaphoneura is a moth in the family Immidae. It was described by Edward Meyrick in 1934. It is found in Taiwan.
