= Imma monastica =

Scientific classification
- Kingdom: Animalia
- Phylum: Arthropoda
- Class: Insecta
- Order: Lepidoptera
- Family: Immidae
- Genus: Imma
- Species: I. monastica

Binomial name
- Imma monastica Meyrick, 1910

Species of moth

Imma monastica is a moth in the family Immidae. It was described by Edward Meyrick in 1910. It is found on Ambon Island in the Moluccas of Indonesia.

The wingspan is 17–21 mm. The forewings are dark fuscous, faintly purplish tinged. There is a wedge-shaped ochreous-white mark from the costa near the apex and a fine white denticulate terminal line. The hindwings are dark fuscous, lighter anteriorly. There are broad median and dorsal prismatic-violet-tinged hyaline (glass like) longitudinal patches, confluent towards the base, the upper extending to about three-fourths, the lower nearly to the termen.
