= Imma albofascia =

Scientific classification
- Domain: Eukaryota
- Kingdom: Animalia
- Phylum: Arthropoda
- Class: Insecta
- Order: Lepidoptera
- Family: Immidae
- Genus: Imma
- Species: I. albofascia

Binomial name
- Imma albofascia (Felder, 1861)

Synonyms
- Tortricomorpha albofascia Felder, 1861

Species of moth

Imma albofascia is a moth of the family Immidae. It is known from Ambon Island (Indonesia), Sri Lanka and southern India.

The wingspan is 22–23 mm. The forewings are fuscous, sprinkled with dark fuscous and with a patch of dark fuscous suffusion extending along the costa from the base to five-sixths and reaching two-thirds across the wing, terminated posteriorly by a tornal blotch of whitish suffusion obscurely extended towards the apex (but this blotch is sometimes almost obsolete). An almost marginal series of ochreous-whitish marks is found around the apex and tornus. The hindwings are dark fuscous.
