= Imma thymora =

Scientific classification
- Kingdom: Animalia
- Phylum: Arthropoda
- Class: Insecta
- Order: Lepidoptera
- Family: Immidae
- Genus: Imma
- Species: I. thymora

Binomial name
- Imma thymora Meyrick, 1906

Species of moth

Imma thymora is a moth in the family Immidae. It was described by Edward Meyrick in 1906. It is found in Tefé, Brazil.

The wingspan is 21–22 mm. The forewings are dark brown, slightly reddish tinged, strewn with small irregular ill-defined whitish-ochreous spots, nearly obsolete on the apical area beyond an irregular angulated series from the costa beyond the middle to the dorsum before the tornus. There is a terminal series of pale dots. The hindwings are dark fuscous.
