= Imma strepsizona =

Scientific classification
- Kingdom: Animalia
- Phylum: Arthropoda
- Class: Insecta
- Order: Lepidoptera
- Family: Immidae
- Genus: Imma
- Species: I. strepsizona

Binomial name
- Imma strepsizona Meyrick, 1906

Species of moth

Imma strepsizona is a moth in the family Immidae. It was described by Edward Meyrick in 1906. It is found on Sulawesi.

The wingspan is about 26 mm. The forewings are fuscous, irrorated (sprinkled) with dark fuscous and towards the base with pale ochreous. There is a small ochreous-yellowish basal spot beneath the costa and there are two suffused pale ochreous-yellowish transverse streaks enclosing a moderate fascia of ground colour partially mixed with pale yellowish, running from the middle of the costa to three-fourths of the dorsum, above the middle constricted and with streaks twice confluent. The wing beyond this fascia is wholly blackish fuscous. The hindwings are dark fuscous.
