= Imma tyrocnista =

Scientific classification
- Kingdom: Animalia
- Phylum: Arthropoda
- Class: Insecta
- Order: Lepidoptera
- Family: Immidae
- Genus: Imma
- Species: I. tyrocnista

Binomial name
- Imma tyrocnista Meyrick, 1906

Species of moth

Imma tyrocnista is a moth in the family Immidae. It was described by Edward Meyrick in 1906. It is found on India's Andaman Islands.

The wingspan is 33–35 mm. The forewings are dark purplish fuscous, irregularly strewn with whitish-ochreous scales and with small indistinct cloudy dark fuscous spots in the disc at one-fifth, and before and beyond the middle. There is a cloudy spot of pale irroration (sprinkling) on the costa at three-fifths and a terminal series of pale ochreous connected lunulate marks alternating with cloudy dark fuscous dots. The hindwings are dark fuscous, rather lighter anteriorly.
