= Imma monocosma =

Scientific classification
- Kingdom: Animalia
- Phylum: Arthropoda
- Clade: Pancrustacea
- Class: Insecta
- Order: Lepidoptera
- Family: Immidae
- Genus: Imma
- Species: I. monocosma

Binomial name
- Imma monocosma Diakonof & Arita, 1979

Synonyms
- Moca monocosma

Species of moth

Imma monocosma is a moth in the family Immidae. It was described by Alexey Diakonoff and Yutaka Arita in 1979. It is found on the Japanese islands of Kyusyu and Honshu.

The wingspan is 20–22 mm for males and 24–25 mm for females.
