= Imma inaptalis =

Scientific classification
- Kingdom: Animalia
- Phylum: Arthropoda
- Class: Insecta
- Order: Lepidoptera
- Family: Immidae
- Genus: Imma
- Species: I. inaptalis

Binomial name
- Imma inaptalis (Walker, [1866])

Synonyms
- Vinzela inaptalis Walker, [1866]

Species of moth

Imma inaptalis is a moth in the family Immidae. It was described by Francis Walker in 1866. It is found on Borneo.

Adults are brown, the forewings with a pale ochraceous zigzag middle line and an ochraceous marginal line pale, as well as a triangular pale ochraceous costal spot near the tip, and a smaller pale ochraceous spot joining the marginal line near the interior angle.
