= Fulminatrix =

Fulminatrix may refer to:

- Imma fulminatrix, a species of moth
- Legio Fulminatrix, a common, but incorrect name for the Legio XII Fulminata of the Imperial Roman Army
