= Imma flavibasa =

Scientific classification
- Domain: Eukaryota
- Kingdom: Animalia
- Phylum: Arthropoda
- Class: Insecta
- Order: Lepidoptera
- Family: Immidae
- Genus: Imma
- Species: I. flavibasa

Binomial name
- Imma flavibasa (Moore, 1888)

Synonyms
- Davendra flavibasa Moore, 1888

Species of moth

Imma flavibasa is a moth in the family Immidae. It was described by Frederic Moore in 1888. It is found in India (the eastern Himalayas, Assam).

The basal half of the forewings is deep yellow, the outer half brownish ferruginous, brightest in its middle. The hindwings and abdomen are dark brown.
