= Imma niveiciliella =

Scientific classification
- Kingdom: Animalia
- Phylum: Arthropoda
- Class: Insecta
- Order: Lepidoptera
- Family: Immidae
- Genus: Imma
- Species: I. niveiciliella

Binomial name
- Imma niveiciliella (Snellen, 1885)

Synonyms
- Tortricomorpha niveiciliella Snellen, 1885

Species of moth

Imma niveiciliella is a moth in the family Immidae. It was described by Snellen in 1885. It is found on Sulawesi.
