= Imma mesochorda =

Scientific classification
- Kingdom: Animalia
- Phylum: Arthropoda
- Class: Insecta
- Order: Lepidoptera
- Family: Immidae
- Genus: Imma
- Species: I. mesochorda

Binomial name
- Imma mesochorda Meyrick, 1906

Species of moth

Imma mesochorda is a moth in the family Immidae. It was described by Edward Meyrick in 1906. It is found in Assam, India.

The wingspan is 15–16 mm. The forewings are dark fuscous with a slender rather irregular light ochreous-yellow slightly curved fascia from the middle of the costa to two-thirds of the dorsum, but not quite reaching the dorsal edge, constricted beneath the costa. The hindwings are dark fuscous, lighter towards the base.
