= Imma semiclara =

Scientific classification
- Kingdom: Animalia
- Phylum: Arthropoda
- Class: Insecta
- Order: Lepidoptera
- Family: Immidae
- Genus: Imma
- Species: I. semiclara

Binomial name
- Imma semiclara Meyrick, 1929

Synonyms
- Choreutis semiclara

Species of moth

Imma semiclara is a moth in the family Immidae. It was described by Edward Meyrick in 1929. It is found on the Marquesas Islands in French Polynesia.
