= Imma feaniensis =

Scientific classification
- Domain: Eukaryota
- Kingdom: Animalia
- Phylum: Arthropoda
- Class: Insecta
- Order: Lepidoptera
- Family: Immidae
- Genus: Imma
- Species: I. feaniensis

Binomial name
- Imma feaniensis J. F. G. Clarke, 1986

Species of moth

Imma feaniensis is a moth in the family Immidae. It was described by John Frederick Gates Clarke in 1986. It is found in French Polynesia.
