= Imma grammarcha =

Scientific classification
- Kingdom: Animalia
- Phylum: Arthropoda
- Class: Insecta
- Order: Lepidoptera
- Family: Immidae
- Genus: Imma
- Species: I. grammarcha

Binomial name
- Imma grammarcha (Meyrick, 1905)

Synonyms
- Tortricomorpha grammarcha Meyrick, 1905

Species of moth

Imma grammarcha is a moth in the family Immidae. It was described by Edward Meyrick in 1905. It is found in Sri Lanka and possibly on Borneo.

The wingspan is 23–24 mm. The forewings are brown with the extreme costal edge yellowish from one-fourth to the middle. The base of the dorsum is suffused with dark fuscous and there is a short yellow mark on the middle of the costa from which an obscurely indicated yellowish line proceeds to the dorsum beyond the middle. An obscure dark fuscous discal spot is found at three-fifths and there is a small triangular yellow spot on the costa before the apex, from which a very faintly indicated yellowish line proceeds to the termen below the middle. There is also a terminal series of cloudy dark fuscous dots and the extreme terminal edge is whitish ochreous. The hindwings are dark fuscous, lighter towards the base.
