= Imma homocrossa =

Scientific classification
- Domain: Eukaryota
- Kingdom: Animalia
- Phylum: Arthropoda
- Class: Insecta
- Order: Lepidoptera
- Family: Immidae
- Genus: Imma
- Species: I. homocrossa

Binomial name
- Imma homocrossa Meyrick, 1930

Species of moth

Imma homocrossa is a moth of the family Immidae. It is found on Sumatra.
