= Imma accuralis =

Scientific classification
- Kingdom: Animalia
- Phylum: Arthropoda
- Class: Insecta
- Order: Lepidoptera
- Family: Immidae
- Genus: Imma
- Species: I. accuralis

Binomial name
- Imma accuralis (Walker, [1859])

Synonyms
- Pingrasa accuralis Walker, [1859]

Species of moth

Imma accuralis is a moth in the family Immidae. It was described by Francis Walker in 1859. It is found in Sri Lanka.

The wingspan is about 20 mm. The forewings are ochreous fuscous with a suffused darker discal dot or mark at three-fifths and a small ochreous-whitish oblique costal mark before the apex. There is a dark fuscous terminal line. The hindwings are dark fuscous, lighter towards the base.
