= Imma lysidesma =

Scientific classification
- Kingdom: Animalia
- Phylum: Arthropoda
- Class: Insecta
- Order: Lepidoptera
- Family: Immidae
- Genus: Imma
- Species: I. lysidesma

Binomial name
- Imma lysidesma Meyrick, 1906

Species of moth

Imma lysidesma is a moth in the family Immidae. It was described by Edward Meyrick in 1906. It is found in Assam in India and Perak in Malaysia.

The wingspan is 25–28 mm. The forewings are dark fuscous in males and somewhat lighter ochreous fuscous in females. There is a slender irregular whitish-ochreous line running from a narrow spot on the middle of the costa to near the dorsum at two-thirds, interrupted above the middle, variable in development and sometimes nearly altogether obsolete. The hindwings are dark fuscous.
