= Imma acroptila =

Scientific classification
- Kingdom: Animalia
- Phylum: Arthropoda
- Class: Insecta
- Order: Lepidoptera
- Family: Immidae
- Genus: Imma
- Species: I. acroptila

Binomial name
- Imma acroptila Meyrick, 1906

Species of moth

Imma acroptila is a moth in the family Immidae. It was described by Edward Meyrick in 1906. It is found in Sierra Leone.

The wingspan is 16–17 mm. The forewings are dark fuscous, mixed with glossy purplish slaty on the veins, in females mixed with ochreous between the veins. There is a short orange dash from the base, and a slender streak beneath the costa towards the base, as well as several small scattered orange spots and streaks in the disc. In females, there is an obscure submarginal orange-ochreous line from three-fourths of the costa to the tornus. The hindwings are dark fuscous.
