= Imma metachlora =

Scientific classification
- Kingdom: Animalia
- Phylum: Arthropoda
- Class: Insecta
- Order: Lepidoptera
- Family: Immidae
- Genus: Imma
- Species: I. metachlora

Binomial name
- Imma metachlora Meyrick, 1906

Species of moth

Imma metachlora is a moth in the family Immidae. It was described by Edward Meyrick in 1906. It is found in Brazil.

The wingspan is about 27 mm. The forewings are brown irregularly irrorated (sprinkled) with pale grey, and with very dark brown markings. There is an irregular transverse spot on the middle of the costa, the costal edge beyond this ochreous white for a short distance. Two small spots are transversely placed in the disc at three-fifths, between which is an X-shaped pale suffusion. A short contorted linear mark is found beneath the middle of the disc and there is an irregular subterminal fascia from beneath the apex to the tornus and a terminal series of small subconfluent spots. The hindwings are dark fuscous.
