= Imma thyriditis =

Scientific classification
- Kingdom: Animalia
- Phylum: Arthropoda
- Class: Insecta
- Order: Lepidoptera
- Family: Immidae
- Genus: Imma
- Species: I. thyriditis

Binomial name
- Imma thyriditis Meyrick, 1906

Species of moth

Imma thyriditis is a moth in the family Immidae. It was described by Edward Meyrick in 1906. It is found on the Solomon Islands.

The wingspan is 20–24 mm. The forewings are ochreous fuscous in males, more or less wholly suffused with ochreous yellow, especially on the veins and in the cell, in females darker fuscous. There is a dark fuscous streak along the basal fourth of the dorsum and a slender irregular pale yellowish fascia from before the middle of the costa to two-thirds of the dorsum, edged anteriorly with a few dark fuscous scales, in females less marked and becoming obsolete towards the dorsum. An indistinct darker discal dot is found at two-thirds and there is a small pale yellowish spot on the costa at three-fourths, where proceeds an undefined pale line or series of marks to the tornus, in females nearly obsolete. The costal edge in males is blackish between this spot and the next. There is a small pale yellow triangular spot on the costa towards the apex, where proceeds a pale yellow submarginal line to the termen above the tornus, edged posteriorly with blackish fuscous. The hindwings of the males have slight submedian and subdorsal grooves. The dark fuscous, basal three-fifths is almost naked and transparent, with dark fuscous veins.
