= Imma epichlaena =

Scientific classification
- Kingdom: Animalia
- Phylum: Arthropoda
- Class: Insecta
- Order: Lepidoptera
- Family: Immidae
- Genus: Imma
- Species: I. epichlaena

Binomial name
- Imma epichlaena Meyrick, 1906

Species of moth

Imma epichlaena is a moth in the family Immidae. It was described by Edward Meyrick in 1906. It is found on Borneo.

The wingspan is about 16 mm. The forewings are dark fuscous, with the basal two-fifths deep yellow, the edge paler, irregular, followed by a thick line of leaden-metallic suffusion. There are small yellow spots on the costa at half and three-fourths. The hindwings are dark fuscous.
