= Imma phalerata =

Scientific classification
- Kingdom: Animalia
- Phylum: Arthropoda
- Class: Insecta
- Order: Lepidoptera
- Family: Immidae
- Genus: Imma
- Species: I. phalerata

Binomial name
- Imma phalerata Meyrick, 1906

Species of moth

Imma phalerata is a moth in the family Immidae. It was described by Edward Meyrick in 1906. It is found in Assam, India.

The wingspan is about 22 mm. The forewings are rather dark ochreous fuscous, with a slight purple gloss and ochreous-yellow markings. There is a narrow somewhat curved fascia from one-fourth of costa to one-third of the dorsum, attenuated on the lower half. A moderate triangular spot is found on the costa at three-fifths, and an elongate spot on the costa towards the apex. The hindwings are dark fuscous with a moderate longitudinal ochreous-whitish streak in the disc from one-fourth to three-fourths.
