= Imma aulonias =

Scientific classification
- Kingdom: Animalia
- Phylum: Arthropoda
- Class: Insecta
- Order: Lepidoptera
- Family: Immidae
- Genus: Imma
- Species: I. aulonias

Binomial name
- Imma aulonias Meyrick, 1906

Species of moth

Imma aulonias is a moth in the family Immidae. It was described by Edward Meyrick in 1906. It is found on the Solomon Islands.

The wingspan is about 18 mm. The forewings are ochreous fuscous, finely sprinkled with dark fuscous and with the basal third of the dorsum suffused with dark fuscous. There is a straight slender irregular-edged whitish streak from the middle of the costa to two-thirds of the dorsum and a dark fuscous dot in the disc at three-fifths. An ochreous whitish dot is found on the costa at three-fourths and a slender twice sinuate ochreous-whitish line runs from the costa near the apex to the tornus. The hindwings are dark fuscous, somewhat lighter towards the base.
