= Imma philonoma =

Scientific classification
- Kingdom: Animalia
- Phylum: Arthropoda
- Class: Insecta
- Order: Lepidoptera
- Family: Immidae
- Genus: Imma
- Species: I. philonoma

Binomial name
- Imma philonoma Meyrick, 1925

Species of moth

Imma philonoma is a moth of the family Immidae. It was described by Edward Meyrick in 1925. It is found on Fiji and Samoa.

The wingspan is about 25–26 mm. The forewings are fuscous, faintly purple tinged. The second discal stigma is cloudy and dark fuscous. The hindwings are grey, rather darker posteriorly, in males with the dorsal edge rough scaled and rolled over beneath towards the tornus to form a pocket, a rough-scaled patch towards the termen adjoining this.
