= Imma cincta =

Scientific classification
- Domain: Eukaryota
- Kingdom: Animalia
- Phylum: Arthropoda
- Class: Insecta
- Order: Lepidoptera
- Family: Immidae
- Genus: Imma
- Species: I. cincta

Binomial name
- Imma cincta (Druce, 1898)

Synonyms
- Eustrotia cincta Druce, 1898

Species of moth

Imma cincta is a moth in the family Immidae. It was described by Herbert Druce in 1898. It is found in Guatemala.

The forewings are black, with several very minute yellowish spots along the outer margin. The hindwings are blackish-brown, paler at the base, and with a small black spot at the end of the cell and a black fringe.
