= Imma nephelatma =

Scientific classification
- Kingdom: Animalia
- Phylum: Arthropoda
- Class: Insecta
- Order: Lepidoptera
- Family: Immidae
- Genus: Imma
- Species: I. nephelatma

Binomial name
- Imma nephelatma Meyrick, 1927

Species of moth

Imma nephelatma is a moth in the family Immidae. It was described by Edward Meyrick in 1927. It is found in New Guinea.

The wingspan is 19–21 mm. The forewings are rather dark purplish fuscous, in males with a short pale ochreous median streak from the base, tinged red at the base and a cloudy spot of dark fuscous suffusion on the end of the cell, preceded by an obscure blotch of grey-whitish suffusion extended halfway to the dorsum (in females more distinct on the undersurface). The hindwings are violet-hyaline, with the veins blackish. There is a moderate irregular-edged dark fuscous band around the costa and termen, very narrow on the lower part of the termen but with a long projection on vein 1a.
