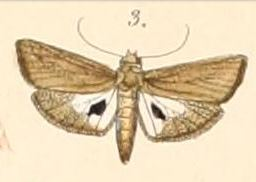

Scientific classification
- Domain: Eukaryota
- Kingdom: Animalia
- Phylum: Arthropoda
- Class: Insecta
- Order: Lepidoptera
- Family: Immidae
- Genus: Imma
- Species: I. atrosignata

Binomial name
- Imma atrosignata (Felder, 1861)

Synonyms
- Tortricomorpha atrosignata Felder, 1861

= Imma atrosignata =

Species of moth

Imma atrosignata is a moth of the family Immidae. It is known from Ambon Island of Indonesia.

The wingspan is about 20 mm. The forewings are fuscous with a slightly darker crescentic mark at the end of the cell. The hindwings are fuscous-grey, towards the base and dorsum thinly scaled and translucent and with an elongate wedge-shaped deep black mark on either side of the antemedian vein from the base to near, but not touching the termen.
