= Imma cyclostoma =

Scientific classification
- Kingdom: Animalia
- Phylum: Arthropoda
- Class: Insecta
- Order: Lepidoptera
- Family: Immidae
- Genus: Imma
- Species: I. cyclostoma

Binomial name
- Imma cyclostoma Meyrick, 1906

Species of moth

Imma cyclostoma is a moth in the family Immidae. It was described by Edward Meyrick in 1906. It is found in Assam in India and Tanintharyi Region of Myanmar.

The wingspan is 21–22 mm. The forewings are rather dark fuscous, more or less sprinkled finely with pale ochreous, which sometimes forms a broad posterior discal suffusion. There is a line of pale ochreous scales along the submedian fold towards the base and a faintly indicated irregular line of similar scales from middle of the costa to two-thirds of the dorsum. An obscure dark fuscous discal dot is found at three-fifths and there is a more or less defined pale whitish-ochreous apical mark, and terminal row of minute sometimes connected crescentic dots. The hindwings are dark fuscous, somewhat lighter towards the base.
