= Imma protocrossa =

Scientific classification
- Domain: Eukaryota
- Kingdom: Animalia
- Phylum: Arthropoda
- Class: Insecta
- Order: Lepidoptera
- Family: Immidae
- Genus: Imma
- Species: I. protocrossa

Binomial name
- Imma protocrossa Meyrick, 1909

Species of moth

Imma protocrossa is a moth in the family Immidae. It was described by Edward Meyrick in 1909. It is found in Bolivia.

The wingspan is about 11 mm (0.43 in). The forewings are dark fuscous, slightly sprinkled with whitish ochreous and with an irregular cloudy pale greyish-ochreous streak along the termen, tending to be interrupted into spots, leaving the terminal edge dark fuscous. The hindwings are rather dark fuscous.
