= Imma otoptera =

Scientific classification
- Kingdom: Animalia
- Phylum: Arthropoda
- Class: Insecta
- Order: Lepidoptera
- Family: Immidae
- Genus: Imma
- Species: I. otoptera

Binomial name
- Imma otoptera Meyrick, 1906

Species of moth

Imma otoptera is a moth in the family Immidae. It was described by Edward Meyrick in 1906. It is found on Borneo.

The wingspan is 16–19 mm. The forewings are dark fuscous, in males with a roundish impression beneath the costa at two-fifths, containing a tuft of whitish-ochreous scales from the upper margin, covered normally by a flap of long fuscous scales from the anterior margin. The extreme costal edge is ochreous whitish on the posterior three-fifths. The hindwings are dark fuscous, somewhat thinly scaled towards the base, with indications of two or three semi-transparent streaks, in males a more distinct pale suffused streak from the base through the disc to beyond the middle.
