= Imma transversella =

Scientific classification
- Kingdom: Animalia
- Phylum: Arthropoda
- Class: Insecta
- Order: Lepidoptera
- Family: Immidae
- Genus: Imma
- Species: I. transversella

Binomial name
- Imma transversella (Snellen, 1878)

Synonyms
- Cryptophasa transversella Snellen, 1878

Species of moth

Imma transversella is a moth in the family Immidae. It was described by Snellen in 1878. It is found in New Guinea, Singapore and on Sulawesi, the Sunda Islands and Java.
