= Imma hyphantis =

Scientific classification
- Kingdom: Animalia
- Phylum: Arthropoda
- Clade: Pancrustacea
- Class: Insecta
- Order: Lepidoptera
- Family: Immidae
- Genus: Imma
- Species: I. hyphantis

Binomial name
- Imma hyphantis Meyrick, 1906

Species of moth

Imma hyphantis is a moth in the family Immidae. It was described by Edward Meyrick in 1906. It is found in Sri Lanka.

The moth has a wingspan of about 21 mm. The forewings are fuscous with fine ochreous-yellow lines beneath the costa from the base to near the middle and on the submedian fold from near the base to beyond the middle. There is a small ochreous-yellow spot in the disc at one-third and an irregular ill-defined ochreous-yellow line from a small spot on the middle of the costa to two-thirds of the dorsum, obsoletely interrupted above and below the middle. Between this and the termen, all veins are marked with extremely fine pale yellowish lines, between which are some shorter pale ochreous-yellowish fine interneural streaks. An ochreous-yellow line is found around the apex and termen, thickened around the apex, edged by a dark fuscous marginal line. The hindwings are dark fuscous, lighter towards the base.
