= Imma epicomia =

Scientific classification
- Domain: Eukaryota
- Kingdom: Animalia
- Phylum: Arthropoda
- Class: Insecta
- Order: Lepidoptera
- Family: Immidae
- Genus: Imma
- Species: I. epicomia

Binomial name
- Imma epicomia Meyrick, 1906

Species of moth

Imma epicomia is a moth in the family Immidae. It was described by Edward Meyrick in 1906. It is found on the Solomon Islands.

The wingspan is 23–25 mm. The forewings are yellow, sprinkled with brownish, the costa narrowly and termen more broadly ochreous, the terminal half in females tinged with ochreous orange. A fuscous mark is found along the basal fourth of the dorsum and there is a trisinuate dark grey line from the middle of the costa to two-thirds of the dorsum, edged posteriorly with lilac suffusion except towards the costa. A curved series of undefined dark grey dots is found midway between this and the termen, indented in the middle, not reaching the margins. There is an irregular curved series of similar dots from a mark on the costa before three-fourths to the tornus and there are some very indistinct grey terminal dots. The hindwings are dark grey with a whitish-ochreous streak above the middle from the base to the end of the cell, where it extends to the lower angle.
