= Imma thianthes =

Scientific classification
- Kingdom: Animalia
- Phylum: Arthropoda
- Class: Insecta
- Order: Lepidoptera
- Family: Immidae
- Genus: Imma
- Species: I. thianthes

Binomial name
- Imma thianthes Meyrick, 1927

Species of moth

Imma thianthes is a moth in the family Immidae. It was described by Edward Meyrick in 1927. It is found in New Ireland and New Hanover.

The wingspan is 20–23 mm. The forewings are dark fuscous, irregularly and suffusedly strigulated (finely-streaked) light ochreous yellow, sometimes coalescing in irregular spots and markings especially on the anterior half. There is a nearly straight transverse light ochreous-yellow median streak, slightly interrupted in the middle beneath a longitudinal bar crossing it, a curved mark beyond this limiting the transverse vein posteriorly. An irregular ochreous-yellow spot is found on the costa about two-thirds, and another on the costa before the apex, where a bisinuate streak runs near the termen to the tornus. There is also a very fine irregular pale yellowish terminal line. The hindwings are prismatic hyaline, with the veins dark fuscous and with a dark fuscous apical blotch occupying one-fourth to one-third of the wing, and reaching the middle of the termen, the terminal edge below this suffusedly dark fuscous.
