= Imma philomena =

Scientific classification
- Domain: Eukaryota
- Kingdom: Animalia
- Phylum: Arthropoda
- Class: Insecta
- Order: Lepidoptera
- Family: Immidae
- Genus: Imma
- Species: I. philomena

Binomial name
- Imma philomena J. F. G. Clarke, 1986

Species of moth

Imma philomena is a moth in the family Immidae. It was described by John Frederick Gates Clarke in 1986. It is found on the Marquesas Islands.
