= Imma melotoma =

Scientific classification
- Kingdom: Animalia
- Phylum: Arthropoda
- Class: Insecta
- Order: Lepidoptera
- Family: Immidae
- Genus: Imma
- Species: I. melotoma

Binomial name
- Imma melotoma Meyrick, 1906

Species of moth

Imma melotoma is a moth in the family Immidae. It was described by Edward Meyrick in 1906. It is found in Sikkim, India.

The wingspan is about 20 mm. The forewings are fuscous, with deep ochreous-yellow markings. There is an almost basal mark from the costa, reaching halfway across the wing and a moderate, subquadrate spot on the dorsum at one-fourth and a short indistinct suffused mark from the costa at three-fifths, as well as an almost apical oblique spot from the costa, not quite reaching the termen, placed in a darker fuscous terminal fascia. The hindwings have a shallow submedian furrow towards the base, placed between ridges of rough orange hairs, the scales of the disc are modified, hairlike and somewhat raised. The hindwings are fuscous, tinged with orange, especially towards the base, with a suffused dark fuscous terminal band.
