= Imma mackwoodi =

Scientific classification
- Domain: Eukaryota
- Kingdom: Animalia
- Phylum: Arthropoda
- Class: Insecta
- Order: Lepidoptera
- Family: Immidae
- Genus: Imma
- Species: I. mackwoodi

Binomial name
- Imma mackwoodi (Moore, 1887)

Synonyms
- Davendra mackwoodi Moore, 1887

Species of moth

Imma mackwoodi is a moth in the family Immidae. It was described by Frederic Moore in 1887. It is found in Sri Lanka.

The forewings are ochreous-yellow with an interrupted basal, and a very broad irregular shaped medial pale violet-brown band, beyond which is a contiguous incurved submarginal series of almost confluent longitudinal streaks followed by a marginal series. The medial band is wavy on its inner edge and broadly bilobed across the disc on its outer edge, its area being marked with a yellow streak at end of the cell and an outer series of spots curving from the costa. The hindwings are pale violet-brown.
