= Imma acrognampta =

Scientific classification
- Domain: Eukaryota
- Kingdom: Animalia
- Phylum: Arthropoda
- Class: Insecta
- Order: Lepidoptera
- Family: Immidae
- Genus: Imma
- Species: I. acrognampta

Binomial name
- Imma acrognampta Meyrick, 1930

Species of moth

Imma acrognampta is a moth of the family Immidae. It was described by Edward Meyrick in 1930. It is endemic to New Guinea.
