= Imma auxobathra =

Scientific classification
- Kingdom: Animalia
- Phylum: Arthropoda
- Class: Insecta
- Order: Lepidoptera
- Family: Immidae
- Genus: Imma
- Species: I. auxobathra

Binomial name
- Imma auxobathra Meyrick, 1906

Synonyms
- Moca auxobathra

Species of moth

Imma auxobathra is a moth in the family Immidae. It was described by Edward Meyrick in 1906. It is found on Borneo and in Nepal.

The wingspan is 15–16 mm. The forewings are dark purplish fuscous in males and blackish in females, with the markings ochreous orange. There is a subcostal streak from near the base to one-fourth and an oblique streak from beneath middle of this to one-third of the dorsum. An oblique series of three small spots is found beyond these, the middle one dash like, a larger subtriangular spot on the middle of the costa, in females a pear-shaped blotch extending almost from the apex of this to near the dorsum at three-fourths, bilobed beneath, in males reduced to two dots representing the extremities. In females a moderate spot in the disc beyond this, in males dot like. There is a curved series of about ten longitudinal marks from beneath the costa at two-thirds to above the tornus, in males reduced and ill defined. The hindwings are blackish fuscous in females, with a pale yellowish triangular spot in the middle of the disc, and a slender pale yellowish subdorsal streak not reaching the base or tornus. In males, the hindwings are dark fuscous, lighter on the discal and subdorsal streaks from the base, the tornus produced into a rounded prominence, above with a deep dorsal groove containing a pencil of long hairs.
