= Imma chasmatica =

Scientific classification
- Kingdom: Animalia
- Phylum: Arthropoda
- Class: Insecta
- Order: Lepidoptera
- Family: Immidae
- Genus: Imma
- Species: I. chasmatica

Binomial name
- Imma chasmatica Meyrick, 1906

Species of moth

Imma chasmatica is a moth in the family Immidae. It was described by Edward Meyrick in 1906. It is found in the Indian states of Sikkim and Assam.

The wingspan is 31–33 mm. The forewings are fuscous finely sprinkled with blackish, with some obscure pale strigulae, especially on the costa anteriorly. There is a blackish streak beneath the costa from near the base to near the middle, interrupted by pale strigulae and there is an undefined blackish line along the submedian fold almost throughout. An undefined irregular blackish streak is found in the disc from one-third to the termen, posteriorly split into three more or less marked branches on the veins, interrupted by a suffused whitish-ochreous dot at three-fifths. The veins towards the costa before the apex and towards the tornus are more or less marked with blackish and there is a small apical spot of pale ochreous suffusion. The hindwings are dark grey.
