= Imma autodoxa =

Scientific classification
- Kingdom: Animalia
- Phylum: Arthropoda
- Class: Insecta
- Order: Lepidoptera
- Family: Immidae
- Genus: Imma
- Species: I. autodoxa

Binomial name
- Imma autodoxa (Meyrick, 1886)

Synonyms
- Thylacopleura autodoxa Meyrick, 1886

Species of moth

Imma autodoxa is a moth in the family Immidae. It was described by Edward Meyrick in 1886. It is found on Fiji.

The wingspan is 19–21 mm. The forewings are fuscous, somewhat purplish tinged and with a streak (sometimes well defined) from the base of the costa to the inner margin before the middle, and a triangular patch extending on the costa from before the middle to the apex, and connected at its apex with the middle of the inner margin by a dentate streak, irrorated (sprinkled) with white. There is a purplish black suffusion along the inner margin to the middle, and along the submedian fold to two-thirds. A black dot is found in the disc before the middle, a second more obscure slightly beyond it on the fold, both sometimes obsolete, and a third larger in the disc beyond the middle. There is also a cloudy ochreous-yellowish spot on the costa at two-thirds, and a second before the apex, from where proceeds a cloudy dentate yellowish line to the anal angle, preceded in the middle by a purplish black suffusion. There is a hind-marginal row of ochreous-yellowish dots. The hindwings are ochreous yellow, with a broad blackish border all round except on the costa.
