= Imma cladophragma =

Scientific classification
- Kingdom: Animalia
- Phylum: Arthropoda
- Class: Insecta
- Order: Lepidoptera
- Family: Immidae
- Genus: Imma
- Species: I. cladophragma

Binomial name
- Imma cladophragma Meyrick, 1906

Species of moth

Imma cladophragma is a moth in the family Immidae. It was described by Edward Meyrick in 1906. It is found in Singapore.

The wingspan is 19–20 mm. The forewings are deep ochreous yellow with longitudinal suffused fuscous streaks above and below the middle from near the base to near the middle and a narrow slightly curved fuscous fascia, anteriorly edged with dark leaden metallic, from beyond the middle of the costa to three-fourths of the dorsum, posteriorly with median and supratornal projecting branches not reaching the termen. There is a waved fuscous terminal line, somewhat dilated towards the apex. The hindwings are rather dark grey.
