= Imma halonitis =

Scientific classification
- Domain: Eukaryota
- Kingdom: Animalia
- Phylum: Arthropoda
- Class: Insecta
- Order: Lepidoptera
- Family: Immidae
- Genus: Imma
- Species: I. halonitis

Binomial name
- Imma halonitis Meyrick, 1920

Species of moth

Imma halonitis is a moth in the family Immidae. It was described by Edward Meyrick in 1920. It is found in Chennai, India.

The wingspan is about 19 mm. The forewings are dark violet grey with a short fine yellow-ochreous dash beneath the costa near the base, with scattered scales indicating a posterior prolongation. A small cloudy whitish-ochreous spot is found on the costa beyond the middle and cloudy whitish-ochreous dots represent the discal stigmata, lying on the margin of a large roundish patch of whitish-ochreous suffusion extending on the dorsum from one-fourth to two-thirds and reaching three-fourths of the way across the wing, posteriorly extended by vague streaks on the veins to the termen. There is a pale ochreous streak around the apical margin, thickest in the middle and attenuated to the extremities, leaving the extreme edge dark grey, and emitting a faint almost marginal line along the termen, the terminal edge obscurely blackish dotted. The hindwings are dark fuscous.
