= Imma spanista =

Scientific classification
- Domain: Eukaryota
- Kingdom: Animalia
- Phylum: Arthropoda
- Class: Insecta
- Order: Lepidoptera
- Family: Immidae
- Genus: Imma
- Species: I. spanista

Binomial name
- Imma spanista Meyrick, 1930

Species of moth

Imma spanista is a moth of the family Immidae. It was described by Edward Meyrick in 1930. It is found on New Guinea and Papua New Guinea.
