= Imma denticulata =

Scientific classification
- Kingdom: Animalia
- Phylum: Arthropoda
- Class: Insecta
- Order: Lepidoptera
- Family: Immidae
- Genus: Imma
- Species: I. denticulata

Binomial name
- Imma denticulata Meyrick, 1910

Species of moth

Imma denticulata is a moth in the family Immidae. It was described by Edward Meyrick in 1910. It is found on Borneo and Timor.

The wingspan is 18–19 mm. The forewings are rather dark fuscous with the extreme costal edge ochreous whitish and with a suffused indistinct darker fuscous mark on the transverse vein. There is a very small ochreous-whitish triangular spot on the costa near the apex. The hindwings of the males are fuscous, darker posteriorly, towards the base thinly scaled, with broad hyaline (glass-like) median and subdorsal streaks from the base to about three-fourths. In females, the hindwings are dark fuscous, on the basal half thinly scaled with broad median and subdorsal streaks. These are subhyaline and mixed with whitish.
