= Imma lithosioides =

Scientific classification
- Domain: Eukaryota
- Kingdom: Animalia
- Phylum: Arthropoda
- Class: Insecta
- Order: Lepidoptera
- Family: Immidae
- Genus: Imma
- Species: I. lithosioides

Binomial name
- Imma lithosioides (Moore, 1887)

Synonyms
- Moca lithosioides Moore, 1887; Tortricomorpha diphtherina Meyrick, 1905

Species of moth

Imma lithosioides is a moth in the family Immidae. It was described by Frederic Moore in 1887. It is found in Sri Lanka.

The wingspan is 22–23 mm. The forewings are rather dark fuscous, more or less strewn with brownish-ochreous scales and with brownish ochreous markings, obscurely edged with pale yellow-ochreous. There is a bisinuate basal patch, sometimes little marked, its edge running from beyond one-fourth of the costa to before the middle of the dorsum. Semi-oval spots are found on the costa before and beyond the middle and there is an irregular discal patch extending from the middle to five-sixths, in females obscured by general ochreous suffusion. There is a triangular apical spot, as well as some irregular suffused markings towards the tornus and a dark fuscous terminal line. The hindwings are fuscous, suffused with dark fuscous towards the termen.
