= Imma rugosalis =

Scientific classification
- Domain: Eukaryota
- Kingdom: Animalia
- Phylum: Arthropoda
- Class: Insecta
- Order: Lepidoptera
- Family: Immidae
- Genus: Imma
- Species: I. rugosalis

Binomial name
- Imma rugosalis Walker, [1859]

Species of moth

Imma rugosalis is a moth in the family Immidae. It was described by Francis Walker in 1859. It is found in Sri Lanka.

The forewings are fuscous, with a darker discal dot at two-thirds. The hindwings are darker fuscous.
