= Imma tetrope =

Scientific classification
- Domain: Eukaryota
- Kingdom: Animalia
- Phylum: Arthropoda
- Class: Insecta
- Order: Lepidoptera
- Family: Immidae
- Genus: Imma
- Species: I. tetrope

Binomial name
- Imma tetrope (Diakonoff, 1978)

Synonyms
- Alampla tetrope Diakonoff, 1978

Species of moth

Imma tetrope is a moth in the family Immidae. It was described by Alexey Diakonoff in 1978. It is found in Nepal.

The wingspan is about 15 mm. The forewings are dark purplish fuscous, anteriorly more dull blackish fuscous, posteriorly slightly lighter brownish fuscous with a bronze gloss. A slightly outwards-oblique transverse erected-oval white discal spot is found just beyond and parallel to the closing vein, rounded on both ends, gently narrowed downwards. There is a small whitish inwards-oblique mark beyond two-thirds of the costa, with a metallic blue dot below it and a couple of similar dots is found below the costa halfway between the preceding and the apex and a close series of such dots is located before the termen. The hindwings are deep purplish fuscous, suffused with dark purple and with an ill-defined paler fuscous marginal streak from around the apex to the tornus, preceded by a narrower similar streak. There is also a narrow blue-metallic line, throughout edging a marginal streak anteriorly and an erected-triangular suffused whitish discal spot, slightly before the middle, from the costa, with a truncate base on the lower edge of the cell.
