= Imma diluticiliata =

Scientific classification
- Kingdom: Animalia
- Phylum: Arthropoda
- Clade: Pancrustacea
- Class: Insecta
- Order: Lepidoptera
- Family: Immidae
- Genus: Imma
- Species: I. diluticiliata

Binomial name
- Imma diluticiliata (Walsingham, 1900)

Synonyms
- Tortricomorpha diluticiliata Walsingham, 1900

Species of moth

Imma diluticiliata is a moth in the family Immidae. It was described by Thomas de Grey in 1900. It is found in India (Assam) and on Sulu.

The wingspan is about 17 mm. The forewings are unicolorous smoky grey brown, with a slight purplish tinge. The extreme edge of the costa is pale stone grey (not coming over the upper surface of the wing). The hindwings are brownish, partially transparent between the veins near the base. The costa is whitish grey.
