= Imma chlorosphena =

Scientific classification
- Kingdom: Animalia
- Phylum: Arthropoda
- Class: Insecta
- Order: Lepidoptera
- Family: Immidae
- Genus: Imma
- Species: I. chlorosphena

Binomial name
- Imma chlorosphena Meyrick, 1906

Species of moth

Imma chlorosphena is a moth in the family Immidae. It was described by Edward Meyrick in 1906. It is found in Sri Lanka.

The wingspan is about 15 mm. The forewings are rather dark fuscous, slightly ochreous tinged, darker posteriorly, the costa and termen suffusedly blackish fuscous. In males there is an oval impression beneath the costa at two-fifths, containing a tuft of whitish-ochreous scales from the upper margin, covered by a flap of long fuscous scales from the anterior margin. The hindwings are blackish fuscous, with an elongate wedge-shaped ochreous-whitish spot in the middle of the disc.
