= Imma aeluropis =

Scientific classification
- Kingdom: Animalia
- Phylum: Arthropoda
- Class: Insecta
- Order: Lepidoptera
- Family: Immidae
- Genus: Imma
- Species: I. aeluropis

Binomial name
- Imma aeluropis Meyrick, 1906

Species of moth

Imma aeluropis is a moth in the family Immidae. It was described by Edward Meyrick in 1906. It is found on Borneo.

The wingspan is about 25 mm. The forewings are rather dark ochreous fuscous, slightly purplish tinged. There are small indistinct spots of pale ochreous suffusion on the costa before the middle, before three-fourths, and at the apex. An oblong pale ochreous patch extends on the dorsum from the middle to the tornus and reaching nearly halfway across the wing, suffused above. The hindwings are dark fuscous.
