= Imma alienella =

Scientific classification
- Kingdom: Animalia
- Phylum: Arthropoda
- Class: Insecta
- Order: Lepidoptera
- Family: Immidae
- Genus: Imma
- Species: I. alienella

Binomial name
- Imma alienella (Walker, 1864)

Synonyms
- Topaza alienella Walker, 1864

Species of moth

Imma alienella is a moth in the family Immidae. It was described by Francis Walker in 1864. It is found on Borneo.

The adults are dark cupreous brown, the forewings with luteous (muddy-yellow) marks. There is a short oblique basal streak, a middle band composed of three irregularly triangular spots, an apical triangular spot and some connected marginal points. The hindwings are pale cinereous (ash gray) along the costa.
