= Imma megalyntis =

Scientific classification
- Kingdom: Animalia
- Phylum: Arthropoda
- Class: Insecta
- Order: Lepidoptera
- Family: Immidae
- Genus: Imma
- Species: I. megalyntis

Binomial name
- Imma megalyntis Meyrick, 1906

Species of moth

Imma megalyntis is a moth in the family Immidae. It was described by Edward Meyrick in 1906. It is found on Borneo.

The wingspan is about 19 mm. The forewings are blackish fuscous, with ochreous-yellow markings. There is a submedian streak from the base to two-fifths, posteriorly dilated. A small oblique wedge-shaped spot is found on the costa at one-fifth and there are two large rounded-triangular spots on the costa at one-third and two-thirds, and two larger spots in the dorsal half of the wing rather obliquely beyond these respectively. The hindwings are blackish fuscous, towards the base more thinly scaled and with several slender semi-transparent streaks. There is a longitudinal ochreous-yellow spot in the disc beneath the middle.
