= Imma chlorosoma =

Scientific classification
- Kingdom: Animalia
- Phylum: Arthropoda
- Class: Insecta
- Order: Lepidoptera
- Family: Immidae
- Genus: Imma
- Species: I. chlorosoma

Binomial name
- Imma chlorosoma Meyrick, 1906

Species of moth

Imma chlorosoma is a moth in the family Immidae. It was described by Edward Meyrick in 1906. It is found in Assam, India.

The wingspan is about 27 mm. The forewings are dark purple fuscous with an ochreous-whitish basal patch, the outer edge running from the base of the costa to one-fourth of the dorsum, more ochreous towards the costa. There are very indistinct dots of ochreous suffusion on the costa at two-fifths and three-fifths and before the apex and some slight ochreous suffusion towards the tornus. The hindwings have the dorsal area clothed with dense long hairs. They are fuscous, becoming dark fuscous posteriorly. There is a basal patch of white suffusion and an irregular elongate-triangular patch of white suffusion in the disc, on which the lower margin of the cell appears as a dark fuscous intersecting line.
