= Imma congrualis =

Scientific classification
- Domain: Eukaryota
- Kingdom: Animalia
- Phylum: Arthropoda
- Class: Insecta
- Order: Lepidoptera
- Family: Immidae
- Genus: Imma
- Species: I. congrualis

Binomial name
- Imma congrualis Walsingham, 1900

Species of moth

Imma congrualis is a moth in the family Immidae. It was described by Thomas de Grey in 1900. It is found in New Guinea.

The wingspan is 25–28 mm. The forewings are fuscous, faintly purplish-tinged and with an indistinct dark fuscous discal dot at three-fifths, in females with a narrow terminal fascia of dark fuscous suffusion, in males linear and nearly obsolete. The hindwings in males have a shallow submedian groove, furnished with some rather dark fuscous long hairs, in females becoming more blackish-fuscous posteriorly.
