= Imma crocozela =

Scientific classification
- Kingdom: Animalia
- Phylum: Arthropoda
- Class: Insecta
- Order: Lepidoptera
- Family: Immidae
- Genus: Imma
- Species: I. crocozela

Binomial name
- Imma crocozela Meyrick, 1906

Species of moth

Imma crocozela is a moth in the family Immidae. It was described by Edward Meyrick in 1906. It is found on New Guinea.

The wingspan is about 21 mm. The forewings are dark fuscous purple with ochreous-yellow markings. There is a fine costal streak, dilated towards the base and a streak in the disc from near the base to the middle. A large oblique triangular blotch is found on the middle of the costa, the apex directed towards the tornus and reaching two-thirds of the way across the wing. There is also an elongate mark along the dorsum from one-third to three-fourths and a narrow fascia around the apical fourth of the costa and termen to the tornus, broadest at the apex. The hindwings have a subdorsal groove. They are dark fuscous, lighter towards the base and dorsum.
