= Imma ciniata =

Scientific classification
- Domain: Eukaryota
- Kingdom: Animalia
- Phylum: Arthropoda
- Class: Insecta
- Order: Lepidoptera
- Family: Immidae
- Genus: Imma
- Species: I. ciniata

Binomial name
- Imma ciniata (Druce, 1898)

Synonyms
- Thalpochares ciniata Druce, 1898

Species of moth

Imma ciniata is a moth in the family Immidae. It was described by Druce in 1898. It is found in Panama.

The forewings are brownish-black, thickly spotted all over with grey and black fringe. The hindwings are very dark brown, slightly paler at the base.
