= Imma psithyristis =

Scientific classification
- Domain: Eukaryota
- Kingdom: Animalia
- Phylum: Arthropoda
- Class: Insecta
- Order: Lepidoptera
- Family: Immidae
- Genus: Imma
- Species: I. psithyristis

Binomial name
- Imma psithyristis Meyrick, 1906

Species of moth

Imma psithyristis is a moth in the family Immidae. It was described by Edward Meyrick in 1906. It is found on the Solomon Islands.

The wingspan is 23–24 mm. The forewings are rather dark purplish-fuscous, strewn throughout with fine pale ochreous-fuscous strigulae and with a dark fuscous discal dot at three-fifths. The hindwings are rather dark fuscous.
