= Imma confluens =

Scientific classification
- Kingdom: Animalia
- Phylum: Arthropoda
- Class: Insecta
- Order: Lepidoptera
- Family: Immidae
- Genus: Imma
- Species: I. confluens

Binomial name
- Imma confluens Meyrick, 1931

Species of moth

Imma confluens is a moth in the family Immidae. It was described by Edward Meyrick in 1931. It is found in Brazil, Venezuela and French Guiana.
