= Boeta =

Boeta may refer to:

== People ==
- Boeta Chamberlain (born 1999), South African rugby union player
- Boeta Dippenaar, South African cricket player
- Boeta Hamman (born 1997), South African rugby union player

== Other ==
- Imma boeta, moth in the family Immidae
