= Imma periploca =

Scientific classification
- Kingdom: Animalia
- Phylum: Arthropoda
- Class: Insecta
- Order: Lepidoptera
- Family: Immidae
- Genus: Imma
- Species: I. periploca

Binomial name
- Imma periploca Meyrick, 1910

Species of moth

Imma periploca is a moth in the family Immidae. It was described by Edward Meyrick in 1910. It is found on New Guinea.

The wingspan is about 21 mm. The forewings are dark fuscous purple with an ochreous-yellow streak running around the base, the costa, and the termen, forming a narrow basal patch which extends on the costa and the dorsum so that the edge is concave, very slender through the middle of the costa, at the apex forming a triangular patch, and again very finely attenuated towards the tornus. The hindwings are blackish grey.
