= Imma psoricopa =

Scientific classification
- Domain: Eukaryota
- Kingdom: Animalia
- Phylum: Arthropoda
- Class: Insecta
- Order: Lepidoptera
- Family: Immidae
- Genus: Imma
- Species: I. psoricopa

Binomial name
- Imma psoricopa Meyrick, 1906

Species of moth

Imma psoricopa is a moth in the family Immidae. It was described by Edward Meyrick in 1906. It is found in Sri Lanka.

The wingspan is 17–20 mm. The forewings are light ochreous-fuscous, suffusedly strigulated throughout with dark fuscous and with small obscure whitish-ochreous spots on the costa beyond the middle and before the apex. There is an ochreous-whitish discal dot at three-fifths, followed by a dark fuscous dot. The hindwings are rather dark grey.
