= Imma dioptrias =

Scientific classification
- Kingdom: Animalia
- Phylum: Arthropoda
- Class: Insecta
- Order: Lepidoptera
- Family: Immidae
- Genus: Imma
- Species: I. dioptrias

Binomial name
- Imma dioptrias Meyrick, 1906

Species of moth

Imma dioptrias is a moth in the family Immidae. It was described by Edward Meyrick in 1906. It is found on New Guinea.

The wingspan is about 18 mm. The forewings are dark fuscous, the basal two-thirds suffused with violet blue. There are short yellowish subcostal and median streaks from the base, connected at the base, merged posteriorly in a broad transverse band of tawny-ochreous suffusion, limited by a narrow yellow fascia from before the middle of the costa to near the middle of the dorsum, not quite reaching it. A triangular pale yellow spot is found on the costa just before the apex, and a series of faint yellowish dots is located before the termen. The hindwings are transparent, with dark fuscous veins and a broad costal and narrower irregular terminal band. Both dark fuscous.
