= Imma pardalina =

Scientific classification
- Kingdom: Animalia
- Phylum: Arthropoda
- Clade: Pancrustacea
- Class: Insecta
- Order: Lepidoptera
- Family: Immidae
- Genus: Imma
- Species: I. pardalina

Binomial name
- Imma pardalina (Walker, 1863)

Synonyms
- Gyrtona pardalina Walker, 1863

Species of moth

Imma pardalina is a moth in the family Immidae. It was described by Francis Walker in 1863. It is found on Borneo and in Malaysia (Selangor) and Singapore.

The wingspan is 20–21 mm (0.79–0.83 in). The forewings are fuscous with the submedian fold forming a whitish-ochreous groove towards the base, terminating in a small basal spot of raised whitish-ochreous scales, the median area forming a very indefinite ochreous-whitish band, the anterior edge running from about two-fifths of the costa to before the middle of the dorsum, acutely triangular-prominent above the middle and indented above and below this, on the lower half preceded by dark reddish-fuscous suffusion, the posterior edge from about three-fourths of the costa to three-fourths of the dorsum, undefined. Within this band are a semi-oval cloudy dark fuscous spot on the middle of the costa and a longitudinal blackish-fuscous sometimes interrupted mark in the disc, strongly hooked upwards at the posterior extremity. The posterior area is reddish tinged and finely irrorated with blackish fuscous, with a submarginal series of irregular brownish-ochreous triangular marks. The hindwings have a subdorsal groove. They are dark fuscous, somewhat lighter towards the base.
