= Imma nubigena =

Scientific classification
- Kingdom: Animalia
- Phylum: Arthropoda
- Class: Insecta
- Order: Lepidoptera
- Family: Immidae
- Genus: Imma
- Species: I. nubigena

Binomial name
- Imma nubigena Meyrick, 1910

Species of moth

Imma nubigena is a moth in the family Immidae. It was described by Edward Meyrick in 1910. It is found on Bali.

The wingspan is 27–29 mm. The forewings are dark fuscous with the basal two-fifths darker with a strong purple gloss, limited by a cloudy irregularly waved pale greyish-ochreous transverse line, sometimes little marked. There is a large rounded purple-blackish apical blotch, limited by a similar less marked line from three-fifths of the costa to the dorsum before the tornus, approximated to the first above the middle but nearly obsolete there, the space between these two lines somewhat irrorated (sprinkled) with pale greyish ochreous. The hindwings are fuscous, lighter towards the apex, the basal half suffused with blackish fuscous.
