= Imma penthinoides =

Scientific classification
- Domain: Eukaryota
- Kingdom: Animalia
- Phylum: Arthropoda
- Class: Insecta
- Order: Lepidoptera
- Family: Immidae
- Genus: Imma
- Species: I. penthinoides

Binomial name
- Imma penthinoides (Pagenstecher, 1884)

Synonyms
- Tortricomorpha penthinoides Pagenstecher, 1884

Species of moth

Imma penthinoides is a moth in the family Immidae. It was described by Pagenstecher in 1884. It is found on the Moluccas.
