= Imma albotaeniana =

Scientific classification
- Kingdom: Animalia
- Phylum: Arthropoda
- Clade: Pancrustacea
- Class: Insecta
- Order: Lepidoptera
- Family: Immidae
- Genus: Imma
- Species: I. albotaeniana

Binomial name
- Imma albotaeniana (Sauber, 1901)

Synonyms
- Tortricomorpha albotaeniana Sauber, 1901

Species of moth

Imma albotaeniana is a moth in the family Immidae. It was described by Christian Johannes Amandus Sauber in 1901. It is found on Java and the Philippines.
