= Imma arsisceles =

Scientific classification
- Kingdom: Animalia
- Phylum: Arthropoda
- Class: Insecta
- Order: Lepidoptera
- Family: Immidae
- Genus: Imma
- Species: I. arsisceles

Binomial name
- Imma arsisceles Meyrick, 1937

Species of moth

Imma arsisceles is a moth in the family Immidae. It was described by Edward Meyrick in 1937. It is found in South Africa.
