= Imma ancistrota =

Scientific classification
- Kingdom: Animalia
- Phylum: Arthropoda
- Class: Insecta
- Order: Lepidoptera
- Family: Immidae
- Genus: Imma
- Species: I. ancistrota

Binomial name
- Imma ancistrota Meyrick, 1912

Species of moth

Imma ancistrota is a moth in the family Immidae. It was described by Edward Meyrick in 1912. It is found on New Guinea.

The wingspan is about 18 mm. The forewings are dark lilac fuscous, with ochreous-yellow markings, a spot at the base and a moderate somewhat oblique fascia near beyond this, confluent with it in the middle. There is an irregular transverse streak before the middle, dilated on the costa, broken inwards on the fold, the lower portion sinuate outwards. There is a dot in the disc beyond the middle and a narrow irregular fascia beyond this, interrupted in the middle, not reaching the dorsum. There is a subtriangular spot on the costa towards the apex and a fine line on the submedian fold posteriorly. An ochreous-whitish line runs from just before the lower extremity of the costal spot to the tornus, twice dentate outwards, the lower dentation confluent with an ochreous-yellow spot on the termen above the tornus and there is a fine ochreous-whitish terminal line. The hindwings are prismatic hyaline, with the veins dark fuscous and a dark fuscous band around the costa and upper half of the termen, broadest at apex, continued narrowly and irregularly around the lower part of the termen and tornus.
