= Imma priozona =

Scientific classification
- Domain: Eukaryota
- Kingdom: Animalia
- Phylum: Arthropoda
- Class: Insecta
- Order: Lepidoptera
- Family: Immidae
- Genus: Imma
- Species: I. priozona

Binomial name
- Imma priozona Meyrick, 1906

Species of moth

Imma priozona is a moth in the family Immidae. It was described by Edward Meyrick in 1906. It is found on Borneo.

The wingspan is about 19 mm. The forewings are rather dark fuscous, faintly purplish tinged and with a whitish-ochreous basal dot. There is a slender irregular whitish-ochreous fascia from before the middle of the costa to two-thirds of the dorsum, with a sharp posterior projection in the middle and an obtuse one on the submedian fold. A small triangular whitish-ochreous spot is found on the costa before the apex. The hindwings have a slight subdorsal groove. They are rather dark fuscous, somewhat lighter towards the base.
