= Imma viola =

Scientific classification
- Domain: Eukaryota
- Kingdom: Animalia
- Phylum: Arthropoda
- Class: Insecta
- Order: Lepidoptera
- Family: Immidae
- Genus: Imma
- Species: I. viola

Binomial name
- Imma viola (Pagenstecher, 1886)

Synonyms
- Tortricomorpha viola Pagenstecher, 1886

Species of moth

Imma viola is a moth in the family Immidae. It was described by Pagenstecher in 1886. It is found on the Aru Islands.

The wingspan is about 17 mm. The forewings are brownish-black with a strong violet tinge and white fringes. The hindwings are black up to a white stripe in the center of the wing.
