= Imma homalotis =

Scientific classification
- Kingdom: Animalia
- Phylum: Arthropoda
- Class: Insecta
- Order: Lepidoptera
- Family: Immidae
- Genus: Imma
- Species: I. homalotis

Binomial name
- Imma homalotis Meyrick, 1906

Species of moth

Imma homalotis is a moth in the family Immidae. It was described by Edward Meyrick in 1906. It is found on Borneo.

The wingspan is 21–22 mm. The forewings are rather dark ochreous fuscous, anteriorly slightly purplish tinged. The hindwings are dark fuscous, somewhat lighter towards the base.
