= Imma bilineella =

Scientific classification
- Kingdom: Animalia
- Phylum: Arthropoda
- Class: Insecta
- Order: Lepidoptera
- Family: Immidae
- Genus: Imma
- Species: I. bilineella

Binomial name
- Imma bilineella (Snellen, 1885)

Synonyms
- Tortricomorpha bilineella Snellen, 1885

Species of moth

Imma bilineella is a moth in the family Immidae. It was described by Snellen in 1885. It is found on Sulawesi, the Sangihe Islands, Buru and the Bismarck Archipelago.

The wingspan is 21–23 mm. The forewings are clay grey-brown with two ochreous yellow transverse lines. The hindwings are dark grey.
