= Imma aritogiton =

Scientific classification
- Domain: Eukaryota
- Kingdom: Animalia
- Phylum: Arthropoda
- Class: Insecta
- Order: Lepidoptera
- Family: Immidae
- Genus: Imma
- Species: I. aritogiton

Binomial name
- Imma aritogiton Diakonoff, 1955

Species of moth

Imma aritogiton is a moth in the family Immidae. It was described by Alexey Diakonoff in 1955. It is found in New Guinea.
