= Imma synconista =

Scientific classification
- Kingdom: Animalia
- Phylum: Arthropoda
- Class: Insecta
- Order: Lepidoptera
- Family: Immidae
- Genus: Imma
- Species: I. synconista

Binomial name
- Imma synconista Meyrick, 1918

Species of moth

Imma synconista is a moth in the family Immidae. It was described by Edward Meyrick in 1918. It is found in Kanara, India.

The wingspan is about 17 mm. The forewings are fuscous, irregularly sprinkled with dark fuscous and with a streak of whitish-ochreous suffusion above the basal third of the dorsum. The first discal stigma is obscurely dark fuscous, and there is a very irregular obscure pale greyish-ochreous streak from before the middle of the costa to the tornus. The angles of the cell form hidden small spots of dark fuscous suffusion on the posterior edge of this, and there is some whitish-ochreous irrigation (sprinkles) towards the termen and a terminal series of small triangular cloudy dark fuscous spots separated with whitish ochreous. The hindwings are pale fuscous, with a broad, darker fuscous terminal band.
