= Imma microsticta =

Scientific classification
- Kingdom: Animalia
- Phylum: Arthropoda
- Class: Insecta
- Order: Lepidoptera
- Family: Immidae
- Genus: Imma
- Species: I. microsticta

Binomial name
- Imma microsticta (Hampson, 1897)

Synonyms
- Callartona microsticta Hampson, 1897

Species of moth

Imma microsticta is a moth in the family Immidae. It was described by George Hampson in 1897. It is found in Assam, India.

The wingspan is about 22 mm. Adults are similar to Moca purpurascens, but are browner. The head is brown with some yellow on the frons and palpi. The forewings have two small yellow postmedial spots on the costa. The hindwings have the yellow beyond the cell not extending above vein 4. The underside is without the yellow costal fascia.
