= Imma trichinota =

Scientific classification
- Kingdom: Animalia
- Phylum: Arthropoda
- Class: Insecta
- Order: Lepidoptera
- Family: Immidae
- Genus: Imma
- Species: I. trichinota

Binomial name
- Imma trichinota Meyrick, 1906

Species of moth

Imma trichinota is a moth in the family Immidae. It was described by Edward Meyrick in 1906. It is found on Sulawesi and Bali.

The wingspan is 17–18 mm. The forewings are dark purplish fuscous, in males with a longitudinal impression beneath the costa from one-sixth to the middle, containing a tuft of long ochreous-whitish scales from the posterior extremity, covered by a flap of very long fuscous hairs from the anterior extremity. The costal edge is ochreous white from before the middle to three-fourths. The hindwings are dark fuscous, towards the base thinly scaled, with undefined semitransparent median and subdorsal streaks.
