= Imma phthorosema =

Scientific classification
- Kingdom: Animalia
- Phylum: Arthropoda
- Class: Insecta
- Order: Lepidoptera
- Family: Immidae
- Genus: Imma
- Species: I. phthorosema

Binomial name
- Imma phthorosema Meyrick, 1912

Species of moth

Imma phthorosema is a moth in the family Immidae. It was described by Edward Meyrick in 1912. It is found in Colombia.

The wingspan is about 20 mm. The forewings are dark fuscous with some brownish-ochreous strigulation towards the costa at one-fourth and two obscure blackish dots transversely placed in the disc on the end of the cell. The posterior two-fifths of the wing is irregularly and suffusedly strigulated with light brownish ochreous and an interrupted blackish terminal line. The hindwings are rather dark grey.
