= Imma mormopa =

Scientific classification
- Kingdom: Animalia
- Phylum: Arthropoda
- Class: Insecta
- Order: Lepidoptera
- Family: Immidae
- Genus: Imma
- Species: I. mormopa

Binomial name
- Imma mormopa Meyrick, 1910

Species of moth

Imma mormopa is a moth in the family Immidae. It was described by Edward Meyrick in 1910. It is found in on Ambon Island in the Moluccas of Indonesia.

The wingspan is 14–15 mm. The forewings are purple blackish with four thick transverse suffused whitish-fuscous streaks, the first two straight, the third curved, sharply indented towards the dorsum, the fourth from two-thirds of the costa to the tornus, curved and narrower. There is a whitish-fuscous discal spot between the second and the third. The hindwings are dark fuscous with straight whitish-fuscous postmedian and subterminal transverse streaks, the former suffused with white on the upper half.
