= Imma ochrophara =

Scientific classification
- Domain: Eukaryota
- Kingdom: Animalia
- Phylum: Arthropoda
- Class: Insecta
- Order: Lepidoptera
- Family: Immidae
- Genus: Imma
- Species: I. ochrophara

Binomial name
- Imma ochrophara Bradley, 1962

Species of moth

Imma ochrophara is a moth in the family Immidae. It was described by J. D. Bradley in 1962. It is found on the New Hebrides in the South Pacific Ocean.

The wingspan is about 19 mm. The forewings are light orange yellow and the hindwings are blackish brown.
