= Imma diaphana =

Scientific classification
- Domain: Eukaryota
- Kingdom: Animalia
- Phylum: Arthropoda
- Class: Insecta
- Order: Lepidoptera
- Family: Immidae
- Genus: Imma
- Species: I. diaphana

Binomial name
- Imma diaphana (Pagenstecher, 1884)

Synonyms
- Tortricomorpha diaphana Pagenstecher, 1884

Species of moth

Imma diaphana is a moth in the family Immidae. It was described by Arnold Pagenstecher in 1884. It is found on the Moluccas. This species is also diurnal.
