= Imma leniflua =

Scientific classification
- Kingdom: Animalia
- Phylum: Arthropoda
- Class: Insecta
- Order: Lepidoptera
- Family: Immidae
- Genus: Imma
- Species: I. leniflua

Binomial name
- Imma leniflua Meyrick, 1931

Species of moth

Imma leniflua is a moth in the family Immidae. It was described by Edward Meyrick in 1931. It is found in Colombia.
