= Imma tesseraria =

Scientific classification
- Kingdom: Animalia
- Phylum: Arthropoda
- Class: Insecta
- Order: Lepidoptera
- Family: Immidae
- Genus: Imma
- Species: I. tesseraria

Binomial name
- Imma tesseraria Meyrick, 1906

Species of moth

Imma tesseraria is a moth in the family Immidae. It was described by Edward Meyrick in 1906. It is found on Borneo.

The wingspan is about 23 mm. The forewings are dark fuscous, with purplish and bronzy reflections, posteriorly with a few fine yellowish scales. There is a very indistinct spot of whitish-ochreous suffusion in the disc at three-fifths (on the undersurface represented by an oblique yellowish fascia not reaching the margins). The hindwings have a submedian groove towards the base. They are blackish fuscous with a moderate elongate ochreous-yellow spot in the middle of the disc.
