= Imma cuneata =

Scientific classification
- Kingdom: Animalia
- Phylum: Arthropoda
- Class: Insecta
- Order: Lepidoptera
- Family: Immidae
- Genus: Imma
- Species: I. cuneata

Binomial name
- Imma cuneata Meyrick, 1906

Species of moth

Imma cuneata is a moth in the family Immidae. It was described by Edward Meyrick in 1906. It is found in Brazil and Colombia.

The wingspan is 22–23 mm. The forewings are whitish, more or less suffusedly irrorated (sprinkled) with purplish brown and with very deep brown markings. There is a very oblique acute wedge-shaped mark from the costa near the base, limited anteriorly by a vertical white line from the costa to the fold and a small spot on the costa at one-fourth, almost connected with a transverse elongate-triangular spot in the disc beyond one-fourth. A semi-oval spot is found on the costa before the middle and there are some irregular spots towards the dorsum, as well as a transverse I-shaped mark in disc at three-fifths, beneath which is an irregular patch of dark suffusion. An elongate blotch extends from near the discal mark to near the termen, crossed by a streak of undefined suffusion from three-fourths of the costa to the tornus and there is a pale waved terminal line, preceded by a series of suffused dark dots. The hindwings are dark fuscous.
