= Imma neurota =

Scientific classification
- Kingdom: Animalia
- Phylum: Arthropoda
- Class: Insecta
- Order: Lepidoptera
- Family: Immidae
- Genus: Imma
- Species: I. neurota

Binomial name
- Imma neurota Meyrick, 1906

Species of moth

Imma neurota is a moth in the family Immidae. It was described by Edward Meyrick in 1906. It is found on Borneo.

The wingspan is 16–20 mm. The forewings are dark fuscous with ochreous-yellow markings, in males with a short streak beneath the costa from the base, in females reduced to a basal dot. In females, there is a slender zigzag transverse streak from the costa beyond the middle, reaching three-fourths of the way across the wing, dilated on the costa, in males represented by a transverse series of three small spots or marks, the costal somewhat triangular. A subdorsal dot is found beneath this and the veins posteriorly are marked with fine lines. A slender almost marginal streak is found around the apex and termen to the tornus, broadest at the apex. The hindwings in males have a slight subdorsal groove. They are dark fuscous, lighter towards the base, especially in males. In females, there is a fine pale yellowish almost marginal line around the apex and upper half of the termen.
