= Imma metriodoxa =

Scientific classification
- Kingdom: Animalia
- Phylum: Arthropoda
- Clade: Pancrustacea
- Class: Insecta
- Order: Lepidoptera
- Family: Immidae
- Genus: Imma
- Species: I. metriodoxa

Binomial name
- Imma metriodoxa Meyrick, 1906

Species of moth

Imma metriodoxa is a moth in the family Immidae. It was described by Edward Meyrick in 1906. It is found on Sumbawa island in Indonesia.

The wingspan is about 22 mm. The forewings are fuscous, finely sprinkled with ochreous whitish and with a small indistinct ochreous-whitish spot on the costa before the middle and a moderate dark fuscous discal dot at three-fifths, as well as a slender ochreous-whitish oblique streak from the costa at two-thirds, angulated above the middle and then proceeding as a faint sinuate line to the tornus. There is an ochreous-whitish almost apical dot and an irregular terminal line of dark fuscous suffusion. The hindwings are fuscous with a suffused submedian streak which is paler and ochreous tinged.
