= Imma triardis =

Scientific classification
- Kingdom: Animalia
- Phylum: Arthropoda
- Class: Insecta
- Order: Lepidoptera
- Family: Immidae
- Genus: Imma
- Species: I. triardis

Binomial name
- Imma triardis Meyrick, 1906

Species of moth

Imma triardis is a moth in the family Immidae. It was described by Edward Meyrick in 1906. It is found in southern India.

The wingspan is about 24 mm. The forewings are rather dark fuscous, faintly purplish tinged, the costa somewhat darker. There are three short slender oblique wedge-shaped ochreous-whitish marks on the costa before the middle, before three-fourths, and before the apex. The hindwings are dark grey.
