= Imma eriospila =

Scientific classification
- Kingdom: Animalia
- Phylum: Arthropoda
- Class: Insecta
- Order: Lepidoptera
- Family: Immidae
- Genus: Imma
- Species: I. eriospila

Binomial name
- Imma eriospila Meyrick, 1922

Species of moth

Imma eriospila is a species of moth in the family Immidae. It was described by Edward Meyrick in 1922. It is found in Pará, Brazil.

The wingspan is about 16 mm. The forewings are dark grey, irregularly suffused dark fuscous, with some scattered whitish scales in the disc and a fine pale yellowish subcostal line from near the base to one-fourth, as well as some whitish irroration (sprinkling) beneath the base of the costa. There are three small cloudy whitish spots from beneath one-fifth of the costa to above one-fourth of the dorsum and there is a small white subcostal spot before the middle. The discal mark is obscurely darker, the lower extremity preceded and followed by short fine dashes of white irroration. The extreme costal edge is white about two-thirds. Beneath this is a curved transverse series consisting of four small cloudy whitish spots on the costal area, one retracted in the middle, and two larger whitish spots below the middle. Two cloudy whitish dots are found towards the costa near the apex and three less distinct before the lower portion of the termen. There are some scattered pale ochreous scales in the disc posteriorly and a terminal series of cloudy blackish dots. The hindwings are dark grey with a blotch of whitish-grey suffusion in the disc beyond the cell.
