= Imma chrysoplaca =

Scientific classification
- Kingdom: Animalia
- Phylum: Arthropoda
- Class: Insecta
- Order: Lepidoptera
- Family: Immidae
- Genus: Imma
- Species: I. chrysoplaca

Binomial name
- Imma chrysoplaca Meyrick, 1906

Species of moth

Imma chrysoplaca is a moth in the family Immidae. It was described by Edward Meyrick in 1906. It is found on New Guinea.

The wingspan is about 19 mm. The forewings are purplish fuscous, with ochreous-yellow markings. There is a small spot on the base of the costa, and a moderately large subtriangular spot on the costa about the middle, the extreme costal edge between these is yellow. A moderate streak is found around the apical fourth of the costa and termen to near the tornus, broadest at the apex of the wing, narrowed to the extremities, the extreme apical margin black. The hindwings are fuscous.
