= Imma amphixantha =

Scientific classification
- Kingdom: Animalia
- Phylum: Arthropoda
- Class: Insecta
- Order: Lepidoptera
- Family: Immidae
- Genus: Imma
- Species: I. amphixantha

Binomial name
- Imma amphixantha Meyrick, 1906

Species of moth

Imma amphixantha is a moth in the family Immidae. It was described by Edward Meyrick in 1906. It is found on Borneo.

The wingspan is about 20 mm. The forewings are ferruginous brown with a deep yellow basal blotch occupying two-fifths of the wing, the outer edge straight, slightly irregular, followed by some dark purple-fuscous suffusion. Within this blotch is an elongate fuscous spot on the base of the dorsum and there is a deep yellow streak running around the apical fourth of the costa and the termen to near the tornus, broadest at the apex of the wing, attenuated to the extremities. The hindwings are dark fuscous, somewhat lighter towards the base.
