= Imma trachyptila =

Scientific classification
- Kingdom: Animalia
- Phylum: Arthropoda
- Class: Insecta
- Order: Lepidoptera
- Family: Immidae
- Genus: Imma
- Species: I. trachyptila

Binomial name
- Imma trachyptila Meyrick, 1921

Species of moth

Imma asaphoneura is a moth in the family Immidae. It was described by Edward Meyrick in 1921. It is found on Fiji.
