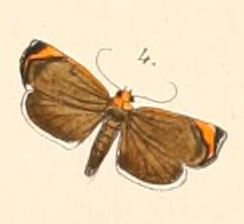
- Imma flaviceps

Scientific classification
- Domain: Eukaryota
- Kingdom: Animalia
- Phylum: Arthropoda
- Class: Insecta
- Order: Lepidoptera
- Family: Immidae
- Genus: Imma
- Species: I. flaviceps

Binomial name
- Imma flaviceps (Felder & Rogenhofer, 1874)

Synonyms
- Tortricomorpha flaviceps Felder & Rogenhofer, 1874

= Imma flaviceps =

Species of moth

Imma flaviceps is a moth of the family Immidae known from the Himalayas.
