= Imma xantharcha =

Scientific classification
- Domain: Eukaryota
- Kingdom: Animalia
- Phylum: Arthropoda
- Class: Insecta
- Order: Lepidoptera
- Family: Immidae
- Genus: Imma
- Species: I. xantharcha

Binomial name
- Imma xantharcha Meyrick, 1906

Species of moth

Imma xantharcha is a moth in the family Immidae. It was described by Edward Meyrick in 1906. It is found on Borneo.

The wingspan is about 19 mm. The forewings are dark purple-fuscous, irregularly strewn with yellow-ochreous scales between the veins and with a short orange line beneath the costa from the base. The hindwings are fuscous, thinly scaled towards the base, the terminal third suffused with dark fuscous.
