= Imma ergasia =

Scientific classification
- Kingdom: Animalia
- Phylum: Arthropoda
- Class: Insecta
- Order: Lepidoptera
- Family: Immidae
- Genus: Imma
- Species: I. ergasia

Binomial name
- Imma ergasia (Meyrick, 1905)

Synonyms
- Tortricomorpha ergasia Meyrick, 1905

Species of moth

Imma ergasia is a moth in the family Immidae. It was described by Edward Meyrick in 1905. It is found in Sri Lanka.

The wingspan is about 20 mm. The forewings are ochreous brown, the base of the dorsum suffused with fuscous and with a nearly straight somewhat irregular thick fuscous line from beyond one-fourth of the costa to two-fifths of the dorsum. There is a spot of fuscous suffusion on the middle of the costa and a curved series of elongate fuscous spots between the veins from three-fourths of the costa to the tornus. The hindwings are dark fuscous, lighter towards the base.
