= Imma procrossa =

Scientific classification
- Kingdom: Animalia
- Phylum: Arthropoda
- Class: Insecta
- Order: Lepidoptera
- Family: Immidae
- Genus: Imma
- Species: I. procrossa

Binomial name
- Imma procrossa Meyrick, 1906

Species of moth

Imma procrossa is a moth in the family Immidae. It was described by Edward Meyrick in 1906. It is found on Borneo.

The wingspan is about 24 mm. The forewings are rather dark ochreous fuscous, slightly purplish tinged, streaked with ochreous between the veins and in the cell, and towards the costa anteriorly with orange. All veins are marked by fine ochreous lines, terminating in a submarginal yellow-ochreous streak from the middle of the costa to the tornus, edged posteriorly with dark fuscous, and leaving a narrow fuscous border all around the costa and termen. The hindwings are dark grey, lighter towards the base.
