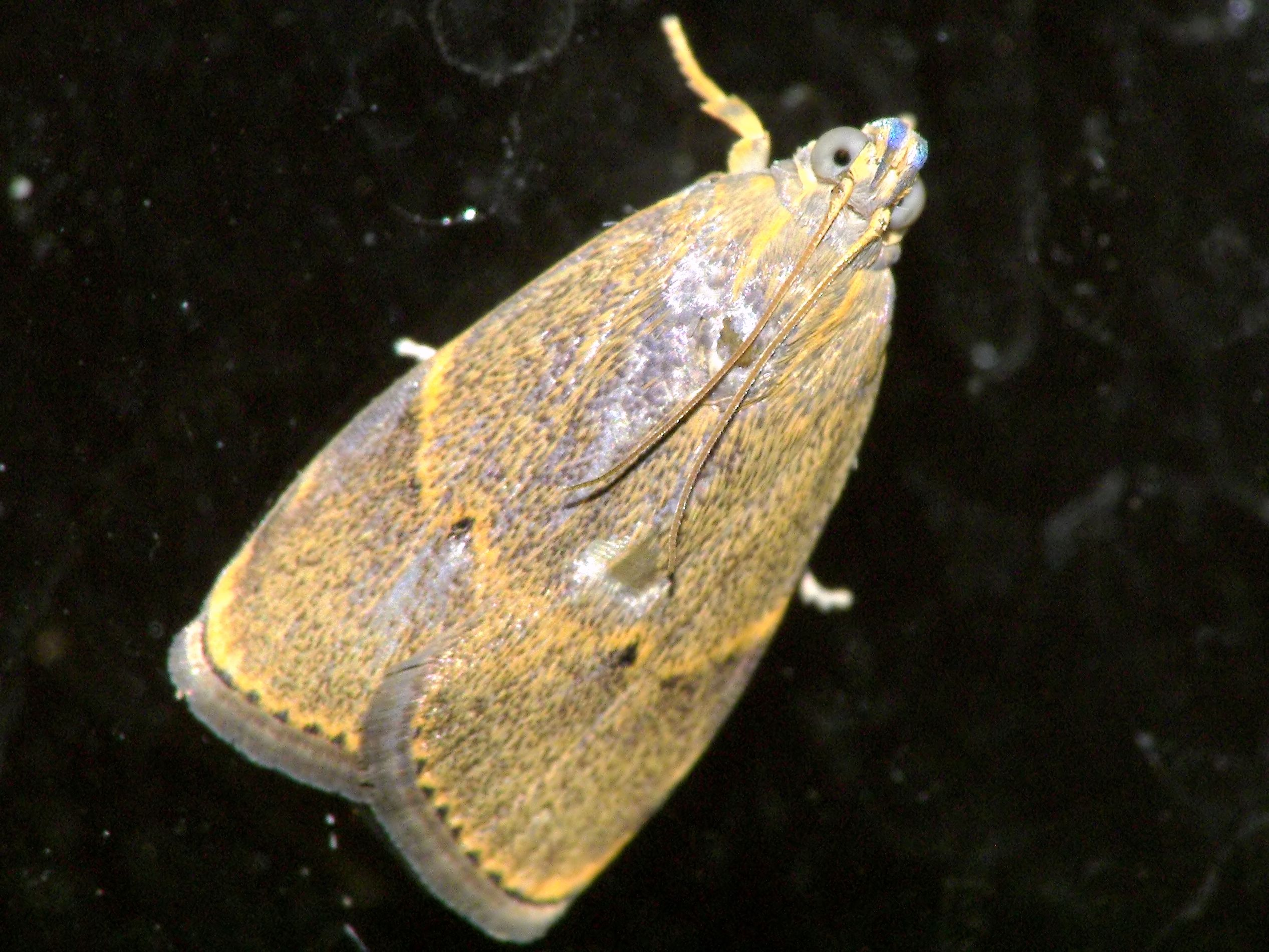
- Imma mylias

Scientific classification
- Kingdom: Animalia
- Phylum: Arthropoda
- Class: Insecta
- Order: Lepidoptera
- Family: Immidae
- Genus: Imma
- Species: I. mylias

Binomial name
- Imma mylias Meyrick, 1906

= Imma mylias =

Species of moth

Imma mylias is a moth of the family Immidae. It is native to Sri Lanka, India, the Andaman Islands, the Philippines and Taiwan. It is an introduced species in Hawaii.

The wingspan is 20–22 mm. The forewings are light fuscous with a faint purplish tinge, densely strewn with pale ochreous-yellowish hair-scales. There are obscure ochreous-yellowish short oblique streaks from the costa at the middle and three-fourths, the first seldom continued as a faint zig-zag line to three-fourths of the dorsum. A round dark fuscous discal dot is found at three-fifths, above which is sometimes a second indistinct dot, and a line of dark scales edging the costal streak. There is also a fine ochreous-yellowish line around the apex and the termen, edged on the apex and the upper part of the termen by a fine blackish marginal line, and on the lower part of the termen by dark fuscous dots. The hindwings are fuscous, becoming dark fuscous posteriorly.

Larvae were reared from pupae found on a banana leaf and have also been reared on foliage of Albizzia species (including Albizia saman), Acacia farnesiana and Pithecellobium dulce. The larvae are green. They leave their feeding sites to pupate under a bark or in litter. The pupa is formed within a loosely woven cocoon.
