= Loxotrochis =

Scientific classification
- Kingdom: Animalia
- Phylum: Arthropoda
- Class: Insecta
- Order: Lepidoptera
- Family: Immidae
- Genus: Loxotrochis; Meyrick, 1906
- Species: L. sepias

Binomial name
- Loxotrochis sepias Meyrick, 1906

Genus of moths

Loxotrochis sepias is a moth in the family Immidae and the sole species of genus Loxotrochis. It was described by Edward Meyrick in 1906. It is found on the New Hebrides.

The wingspan is about 28 mm. The forewings are rather dark fuscous, with the veins obscurely paler. The hindwings are dark grey, with a faint purplish tinge.
