= Ptochaula =

Scientific classification
- Kingdom: Animalia
- Phylum: Arthropoda
- Class: Insecta
- Order: Lepidoptera
- Family: Immidae
- Genus: Ptochaula; Meyrick, 1920
- Species: P. niphadopa

Binomial name
- Ptochaula niphadopa Meyrick, 1920

Genus of moths

Ptochaula niphadopa is a moth in the family Immidae and the sole species in genus Ptochaula. It was described by Edward Meyrick in 1920. It is found in India (Assam).

The wingspan is about 17 mm for males and 23 mm for females. The forewings are dark fuscous with a whitish dot on the end of the cell, smaller in females. The hindwings are blackish-fuscous.
