= Imma lyrifera =

Scientific classification
- Kingdom: Animalia
- Phylum: Arthropoda
- Class: Insecta
- Order: Lepidoptera
- Family: Immidae
- Genus: Imma
- Species: I. lyrifera

Binomial name
- Imma lyrifera Meyrick, 1910

Species of moth

Imma lyrifera is a moth in the family Immidae. It was described by Edward Meyrick in 1910. It is found on New Guinea and Australia, where it has been recorded from Queensland.

The wingspan is 18–19 mm. The forewings are fuscous purple, suffused with blue towards the costa and the markings orange. There are short costal and median streaks from the base and an irregular rather outwards-curved streak from the middle of the costa to three-fourths of the dorsum, dilated on the costa, interrupted in the middle and near the dorsum. A series of eight or nine interneural dashes is found between this and the following streak, but mostly not reaching either. There is a terminal streak, wide on the costa and attenuated to the tornus, the anterior edge concave, enclosing a blackish striga from the costa. The hindwings are hyaline (glass like), with the veins blackish grey and with a moderately broad rather dark grey band along the costa and a moderate blackish-grey terminal fascia, becoming abruptly very narrow near the tornus.
