= Scaptesylomima =

Scientific classification
- Kingdom: Animalia
- Phylum: Arthropoda
- Class: Insecta
- Order: Lepidoptera
- Family: Immidae
- Genus: Scaptesylomima; Kobes, 1989
- Species: S. bicoloroides

Binomial name
- Scaptesylomima bicoloroides Kobes, 1989

Genus of moths

Scaptesylomima bicoloroides is a moth in the family Immidae and the sole species of genus Scaptesylomima. It was described by Lutz W. R. Kobes in 1989. It is found on Sumatra.
