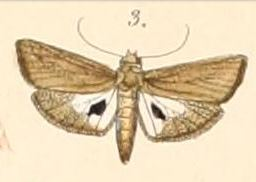
- Imma atrosignata

Scientific classification
- Kingdom: Animalia
- Phylum: Arthropoda
- Clade: Pancrustacea
- Class: Insecta
- Order: Lepidoptera
- Family: Immidae
- Genus: Imma; Walker, [1859]

Type species
- Imma rugosalis Walker, [1859]

Diversity
- >165 species

Synonyms
- Davendra Moore, 1887; Dysapura Turner, 1936; Pingrasa Walker, [1859] Pingrassa (lapsus); Pseudotortrix Turner, 1900; Thylacopleura Meyrick, 1886; Topaza Walker, 1864 (non G.R. Gray, 1840: preoccupied); Tortricomorpha C.Felder, 1861; Vinzela Walker, [1866]

= Imma =

Genus of moths

Imma is a large genus of moths in the obtectomeran "micromoth" family Immidae. This is the type genus of its family. They are widespread in the tropics, with most species occurring between the Himalayas and the Oceanian region; the genus is furthermore plentiful in the Neotropics, but not very diverse in the Afrotropics.

== Selected species ==
Species of Imma include:

- Imma accuralis (Walker, [1859])
- Imma acosma (Turner, 1900)
- Imma acrognampta Meyrick, 1930
- Imma acroptila Meyrick, 1906
- Imma aeluropis Meyrick, 1906
- Imma albifasciella (Pagenstecher, 1900)
- Imma albofascia (Felder, 1861)
- Imma albotaeniana (Sauber, 1901)
- Imma alienella (Walker, 1864)
- Imma amphixantha Meyrick, 1906
- Imma ancistrota Meyrick, 1912
- Imma arenaria Diakonoff, 1955
- Imma aritogiton Diakonoff, 1955
- Imma arsisceles Meyrick, 1937
- Imma asaphoneura Meyrick, 1934
- Imma assita J.F.G.Clarke, 1986
- Imma atrosignata (Felder, 1861)
- Imma atrotacta Diakonoff, 1955
- Imma aulonias Meyrick, 1906
- Imma autodoxa (Meyrick, 1886)
- Imma auxobathra Meyrick, 1906
- Imma bifulminata Meyrick, 1930
- Imma bilineella (Snellen, 1885)
- Imma boeta (Druce, 1898)
- Imma caelestis Meyrick, 1906
- Imma campsigramma Meyrick, 1938
- Imma cancanopis Meyrick, 1906
- Imma catapsesta Meyrick, 1934
- Imma chasmatica Meyrick, 1906
- Imma chloromelalis (Walker, [1866])
- Imma chloroplintha Meyrick, 1928
- Imma chlorosoma Meyrick, 1906
- Imma chlorosphena Meyrick, 1906
- Imma chlorospila Meyrick, 1923
- Imma chrysoplaca Meyrick, 1906
- Imma cincta (Druce, 1898)
- Imma ciniata (Druce, 1898)
- Imma cladophragma Meyrick, 1906
- Imma confluens Meyrick, 1931
- Imma congrualis Walsingham, 1900
- Imma cosmoplaca Meyrick, 1930
- Imma costipuncta (Felder & Rogenhofer, 1874)
- Imma crocozela Meyrick, 1906
- Imma cuneata Meyrick, 1906
- Imma cymbalodes Meyrick, 1906
- Imma cyclostoma Meyrick, 1906
- Imma dedicata Meyrick, 1925
- Imma denticulata Meyrick, 1910
- Imma diaphana (Pagenstecher, 1884)
- Imma diluticiliata (Walsingham, 1900)
- Imma dioptrias Meyrick, 1906
- Imma dipselia Meyrick, 1906
- Imma epichlaena Meyrick, 1906
- Imma epicomia Meyrick, 1906
- Imma ergasia (Meyrick, 1905)
- Imma eriospila Meyrick, 1922
- Imma euglypta Meyrick, 1931
- Imma evelina Meyrick, 1938
- Imma feaniensis J.F.G.Clarke, 1986
- Imma flammula Diakonoff, 1978
- Imma flavibasa (Moore, 1888)
- Imma flaviceps (Felder & Rogenhofer, 1874)
- Imma francenella Legrand, 1966
- Imma fulminatrix Meyrick, 1934
- Imma gloriana J.F.G.Clarke, 1986
- Imma grammarcha (Meyrick, 1905)
- Imma halonitis Meyrick, 1920
- Imma harpagacma Meyrick, 1935
- Imma hectaea Meyrick, 1906
- Imma hemixanthella (Holland, 1900)
- Imma heppneri J.F.G.Clarke, 1986
- Imma homalotis Meyrick, 1906
- Imma homocrossa Meyrick, 1930
- Imma hyphantis Meyrick, 1906
- Imma impariseta J.F.G.Clarke, 1986
- Imma inaptalis (Walker, [1866])
- Imma inclinata Diakonoff, 1955
- Imma infima Meyrick, 1930
- Imma itygramma Meyrick, 1928
- Imma leniflua Meyrick, 1931
- Imma leucomystis Meyrick, 1923
- Imma lichneopa (Lower, 1903)
- Imma lithosioides (Moore, 1887)
- Imma loxoscia Turner, 1913
- Imma lyrifera Meyrick, 1910
- Imma lysidesma Meyrick, 1906
- Imma mackwoodi (Moore, 1887)
- Imma marileutis Meyrick, 1906
- Imma megalyntis Meyrick, 1906
- Imma melanosphena Meyrick, 1918
- Imma melotoma Meyrick, 1906
- Imma mesochorda Meyrick, 1906
- Imma metachlora Meyrick, 1906
- Imma metriodoxa Meyrick, 1906
- Imma microsticta (Hampson, 1897)
- Imma monastica Meyrick, 1910
- Imma monocosma Diakonoff & Arita, 1979
- Imma mormopa Meyrick, 1910
- Imma mylias
- Imma nephelatma Meyrick, 1927
- Imma nephallactis Meyrick, 1906
- Imma nephelastra Meyrick, 1906
- Imma neurota Meyrick, 1906
- Imma niphopelta Meyrick, 1930
- Imma niveiciliella (Snellen, 1885)
- Imma nubigena Meyrick, 1910
- Imma obliquefasciata Walsingham, 1900
- Imma ochrilactea Meyrick, 1934
- Imma ochrophara Bradley, 1962
- Imma otoptera Meyrick, 1906
- Imma oxypselia Meyrick, 1928
- Imma panopta Meyrick, 1906
- Imma paratma Meyrick, 1912
- Imma pardalina (Walker, 1863)
- Imma penthinoides (Pagenstecher, 1884)
- Imma periploca Meyrick, 1910
- Imma phalerata Meyrick, 1906
- Imma philomena J.F.G.Clarke, 1986
- Imma philonoma Meyrick, 1925
- Imma phthorosema Meyrick, 1912
- Imma platyxantha Turner, 1913
- Imma porpanthes Meyrick, 1906
- Imma priozona Meyrick, 1906
- Imma procrossa Meyrick, 1906
- Imma protocrossa Meyrick, 1909
- Imma psithyristis Meyrick, 1906
- Imma psoricopa Meyrick, 1906
- Imma pyrophthalma Meyrick, 1937
- Imma quadrivittana (Walker, 1863)
- Imma quaestoria Meyrick, 1911
- Imma rotia J.F.G.Clarke, 1986
- Imma rugosalis Walker, [1859]
- Imma selenaea Diakonoff, 1955
- Imma semicitra Meyrick, 1937
- Imma semiclara Meyrick, 1929
- Imma spanista Meyrick, 1930
- Imma steganota Meyrick, 1914
- Imma stilbiota (Lower, 1903)
- Imma strepsizona Meyrick, 1906
- Imma synconista Meyrick, 1918
- Imma tesseraria Meyrick, 1906
- Imma tetrascia Meyrick, 1912
- Imma tetrope (Diakonoff, 1978)
- Imma thianthes Meyrick, 1927
- Imma thymora Meyrick, 1906
- Imma thyriditis Meyrick, 1906
- Imma torophracta Meyrick, 1935
- Imma trachyptila Meyrick 1921
- Imma transversella (Snellen, 1878)
- Imma triardis Meyrick, 1906
- Imma trichinota Meyrick, 1906
- Imma tyrocnista Meyrick, 1906
- Imma uranitis Meyrick, 1910
- Imma vaticina Meyrick, 1912
- Imma viola (Pagenstecher, 1886)
- Imma xantharcha Meyrick, 1906
- Imma xanthosticha (Turner, 1936)
- Imma xanthomela Meyrick, 1930

== Selected former species ==
- Imma grammatistis Meyrick, 1906
- Imma minatrix Meyrick, 1906
- Imma radiata (Walsingham, 1897)
