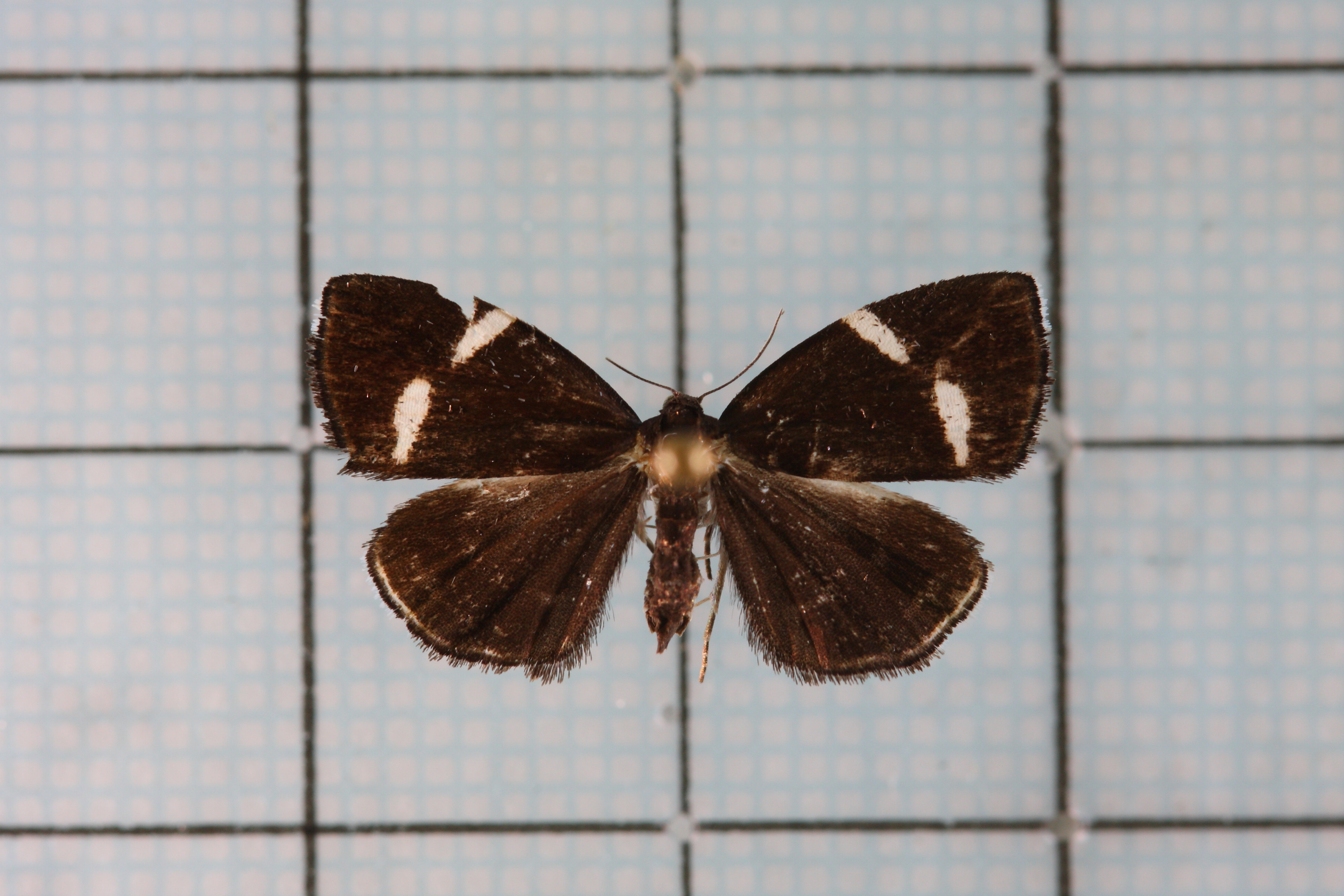

Scientific classification
- Kingdom: Animalia
- Phylum: Arthropoda
- Class: Insecta
- Order: Lepidoptera
- Family: Immidae
- Genus: Alampla
- Species: A. arcifraga

Binomial name
- Alampla arcifraga (Meyrick, 1914)

Synonyms
- Imma arcifraga Meyrick, 1914

= Alampla arcifraga =

Species of moth

Alampla arcifraga is a moth in the family Immidae. It is found in New Guinea and Taiwan.
