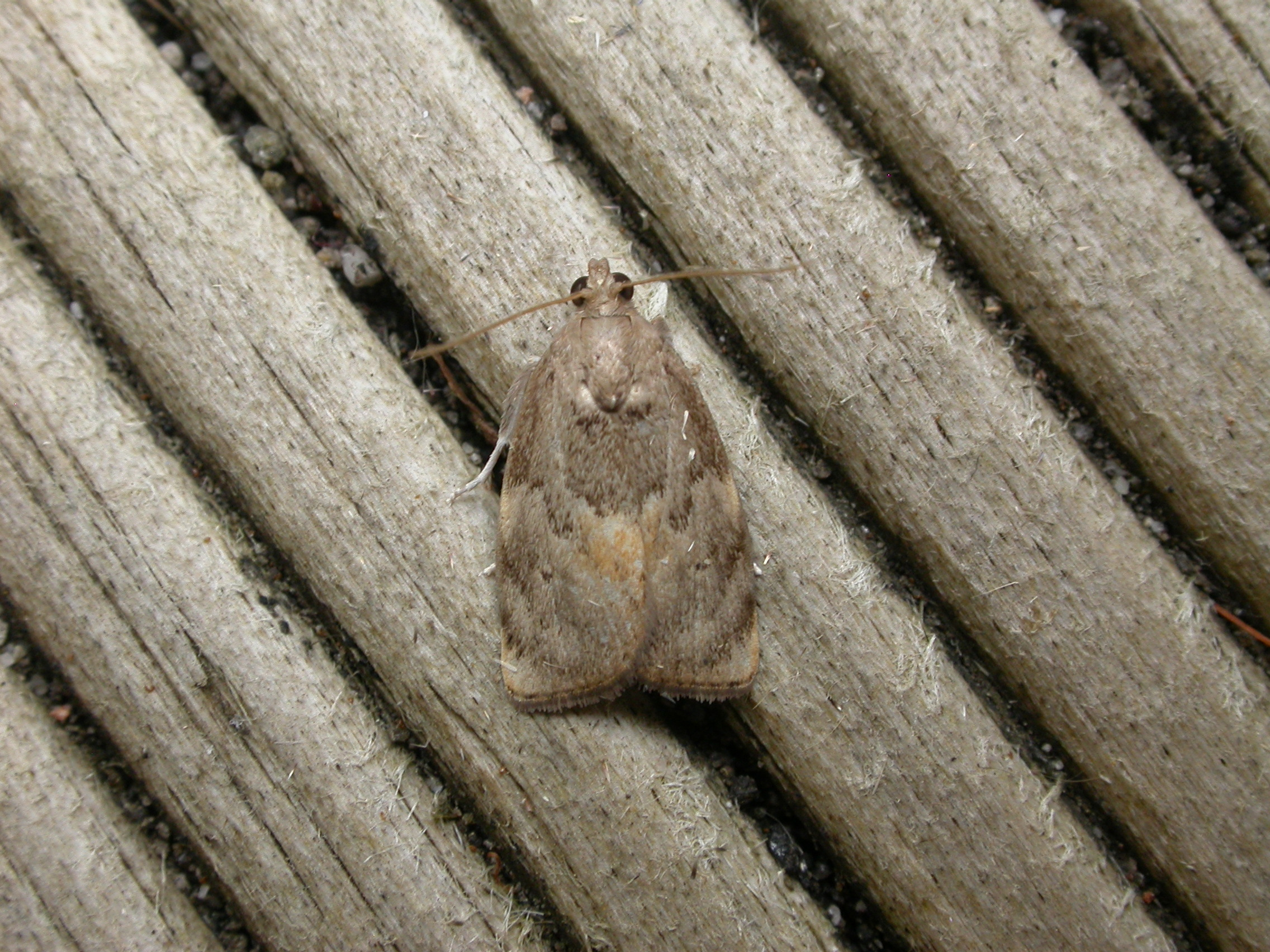

Scientific classification
- Domain: Eukaryota
- Kingdom: Animalia
- Phylum: Arthropoda
- Class: Insecta
- Order: Lepidoptera
- Family: Immidae
- Genus: Imma
- Species: I. acosma

Binomial name
- Imma acosma (Turner, 1900)

Synonyms
- Pseudotortrix acosma Turner, 1900; Tortricomorpha leiochroa Lower, 1903; Imma leiochroa

= Imma acosma =

Species of moth

Imma acosma is a moth in the family Immidae. It was described by Alfred Jefferis Turner in 1900. It is found in Australia, where it has been recorded from Queensland and New South Wales.

The wingspan is 16–17 mm. The forewings are brownish-fuscous, with the posterior portion of the disc sometimes suffused with brownish-ochreous and sometimes with a small fuscous erect line on the inner margin at one-fifth. A very irregularly angled fuscous line runs from the costa before the middle to the inner margin beyond the middle and there is a fuscous dot in the disc at two-thirds, followed by two oblique fuscous lines from the costa at three-fifths and four-fifths towards, but not reaching, the anal angle and hindmargin respectively. All these markings may be obsolete. Sometimes, there is a dark fuscous line close to the upper three-fourths of the hindmargin. The hindwings are fuscous-grey.
