= Imma marileutis =

Scientific classification
- Kingdom: Animalia
- Phylum: Arthropoda
- Class: Insecta
- Order: Lepidoptera
- Family: Immidae
- Genus: Imma
- Species: I. marileutis

Binomial name
- Imma marileutis Meyrick, 1906

Species of moth

Imma marileutis is a moth in the family Immidae. It was described by Edward Meyrick in 1906. It is found in Australia, where it has been recorded from Queensland and South Australia.

The wingspan is 24–25 mm. The forewings are rather dark fuscous, slightly purplish tinged and with a small cloudy dark fuscous discal spot at three-fifths. The hindwings are dark fuscous.
