= Imma xanthosticha =

Scientific classification
- Domain: Eukaryota
- Kingdom: Animalia
- Phylum: Arthropoda
- Class: Insecta
- Order: Lepidoptera
- Family: Immidae
- Genus: Imma
- Species: I. xanthosticha

Binomial name
- Imma xanthosticha (Turner, 1936)

Synonyms
- Dysapura xanthosticha Turner, 1936

Species of moth

Imma xanthosticha is a moth in the family Immidae. It was described by Alfred Jefferis Turner in 1936. It is found in Australia, where it has been recorded from Queensland.
