= Bryonympha =

Scientific classification
- Kingdom: Animalia
- Phylum: Arthropoda
- Class: Insecta
- Order: Lepidoptera
- Family: Immidae
- Genus: Bryonympha; Meyrick, 1930
- Species: B. silvana

Binomial name
- Bryonympha silvana Meyrick, 1930

Synonyms
- Imma foliacea Meyrick, 1930

Genus of moths

Bryonympha is a monotypic moth genus in the family Immidae. Its only species, Bryonympha silvana, is found on Grande Comore of the Comoros in the Mozambique Channel off the eastern coast of Africa. Both the genus and species were first described by Edward Meyrick in 1930.
