= Imma stilbiota =

Scientific classification
- Domain: Eukaryota
- Kingdom: Animalia
- Phylum: Arthropoda
- Class: Insecta
- Order: Lepidoptera
- Family: Immidae
- Genus: Imma
- Species: I. stilbiota

Binomial name
- Imma stilbiota (Lower, 1903)

Synonyms
- Tortricomorpha stilbiota Lower, 1903

Species of moth

Imma stilbiota is a species of moth in the family Immidae. It was first described by Oswald Bertram Lower in 1903. It is found in Australia, where it has been recorded from Queensland.

The wingspan is about 30 mm. The forewings are deep purplish fuscous, minutely irrorated (sprinkled) throughout with bluish-white scales and with an obscure blackish mark at one-third from the base, in the middle. An oblique blackish fascia is found from the inner margin at two-thirds to the posterior end of the cell and there is a row of blackish marks along the termen. The hindwings are dark smoky fuscous.
