= Imma fulminatrix =

Scientific classification
- Kingdom: Animalia
- Phylum: Arthropoda
- Class: Insecta
- Order: Lepidoptera
- Family: Immidae
- Genus: Imma
- Species: I. fulminatrix

Binomial name
- Imma fulminatrix Meyrick, 1934

Species of moth

Imma fulminatrix is a moth in the family Immidae. It was described by Edward Meyrick in 1934. It is found on the Marquesas Islands in French Polynesia.
