= Imma lichneopa =

Scientific classification
- Domain: Eukaryota
- Kingdom: Animalia
- Phylum: Arthropoda
- Class: Insecta
- Order: Lepidoptera
- Family: Immidae
- Genus: Imma
- Species: I. lichneopa

Binomial name
- Imma lichneopa (Lower, 1903)

Synonyms
- Tortricomorpha lichneopa Lower, 1903; Imma lichenopa Meyrick, 1906

Species of moth

Imma lichneopa is a moth in the family Immidae. It was described by Oswald Bertram Lower in 1903. It is found in Australia, where it has been recorded from Queensland.

The wingspan is about 16 mm. The forewings are whitish fuscous, mixed with dull greenish and with a rather broad black outwardly oblique fascia from one-third of the costa to three-fourths across the wing. There is a fine black dentate line, from the costa at two-fifths to the inner margin at one-third, strongly angulated outwards in the middle. There is a narrow black streak from the costa just before three-fourths to halfway across the wing, then continued as a suffused fascia to the anal angle. There is also a dentate line along the termen. The hindwings are black and thinly scaled.
