= Imma boeta =

Scientific classification
- Domain: Eukaryota
- Kingdom: Animalia
- Phylum: Arthropoda
- Class: Insecta
- Order: Lepidoptera
- Family: Immidae
- Genus: Imma
- Species: I. boeta

Binomial name
- Imma boeta (Druce, 1898)

Synonyms
- Thalpochares boeta Druce, 1898

Species of insect

Imma boeta is a moth in the family Immidae. It was described by Druce in 1898. It is found in Panama.

The forewings are black, irrorated with grey scales at the base, with a large oval grey spot about the middle of the wing extending from the costal margin almost to the inner margin, the fringe black, with a grey patch at the anal angle. The hindwings are brownish-black, paler at the base and along the inner margin.
