= Imma vaticina =

Scientific classification
- Kingdom: Animalia
- Phylum: Arthropoda
- Class: Insecta
- Order: Lepidoptera
- Family: Immidae
- Genus: Imma
- Species: I. vaticina

Binomial name
- Imma vaticina Meyrick, 1912

Species of moth

Imma vaticina is a moth in the family Immidae. It was described by Edward Meyrick in 1912. It is found in Australia, where it has been recorded from Queensland.

The wingspan is 20–22 mm. The forewings are violet fuscous with a transverse dark fuscous mark on the end of the cell, in males connected with the dorsum by a direct obscure darker shade, followed by somewhat paler suffusion. The hindwings are hyaline (glass like), with the veins dark fuscous. There is a broad fuscous band along the costa and a dark fuscous terminal band, broadest at the apex, with an abrupt projection inwards beneath vein 2, below this abruptly narrow, then with a long wedge-shaped projection on vein 1b. The dorsum is slenderly suffused with fuscous.

The larvae have been recorded feeding on Fenzlia species.
