= Imma melanosphena =

Scientific classification
- Kingdom: Animalia
- Phylum: Arthropoda
- Class: Insecta
- Order: Lepidoptera
- Family: Immidae
- Genus: Imma
- Species: I. melanosphena

Binomial name
- Imma melanosphena Meyrick, 1918

Species of moth

Imma melanosphena is a moth in the family Immidae. It was described by Edward Meyrick in 1918. It is found in Australia.
