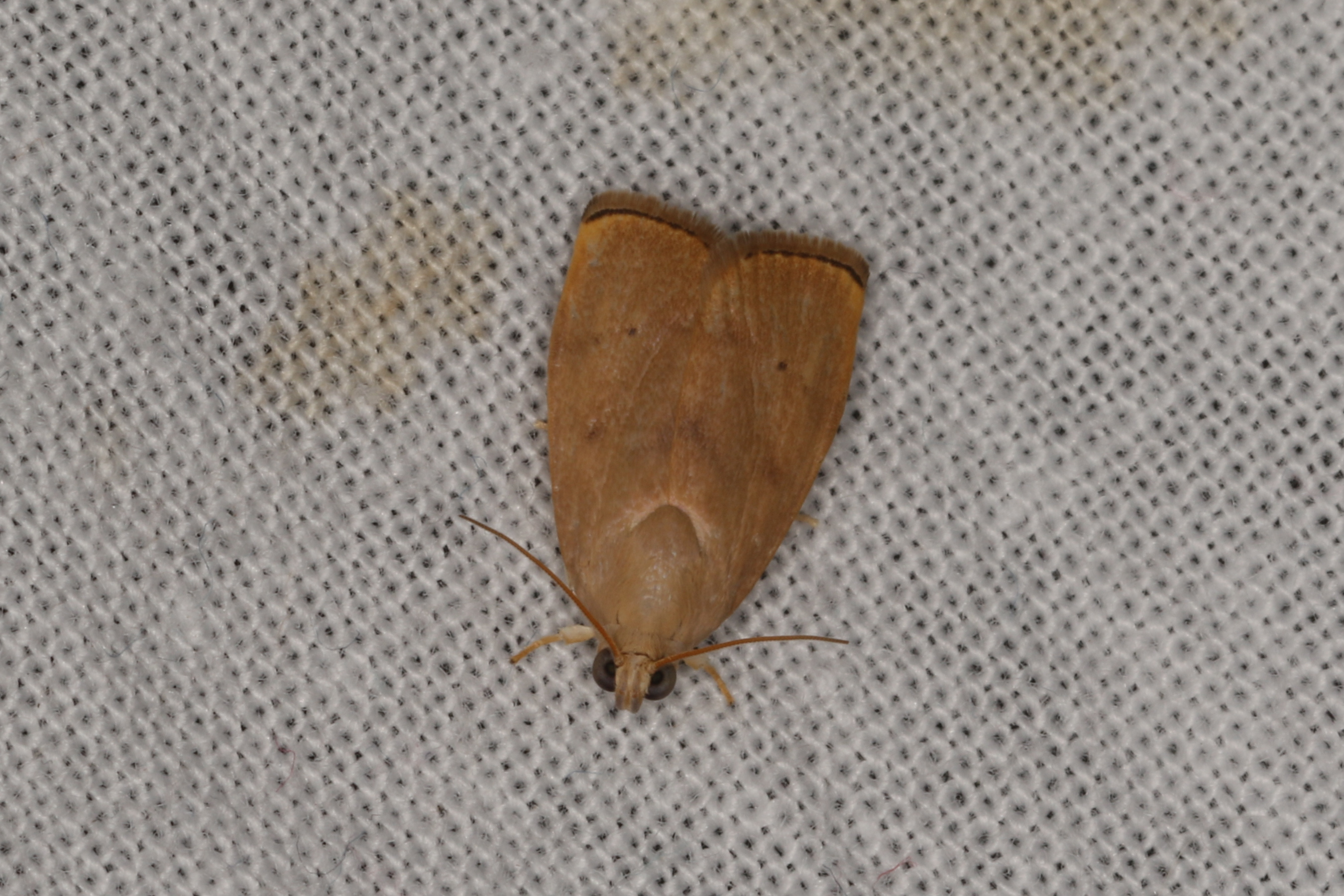

Scientific classification
- Kingdom: Animalia
- Phylum: Arthropoda
- Clade: Pancrustacea
- Class: Insecta
- Order: Lepidoptera
- Family: Immidae
- Genus: Imma
- Species: I. tetrascia

Binomial name
- Imma tetrascia Meyrick, 1912

= Imma tetrascia =

Species of moth

Imma tetrascia is a moth in the family Immidae. It was described by Edward Meyrick in 1912. It is found in Australia, where it has been recorded from Queensland and Western Australia.

The wingspan is 19–20 mm. The forewings are pale ochreous yellowish with four rather irregular transverse fuscous lines or shades, the first very near the base, the second at one-third, broken and interrupted in the middle, the upper portion oblique, the third beyond the middle, somewhat oblique, the fourth from four-fifths of the costa to the tornus, rather curved, sometimes very faint except towards the costa. There is a slender dark fuscous streak around the apex and upper portion of the termen. The hindwings are rather dark fuscous.
