= Imma albifasciella =

Scientific classification
- Domain: Eukaryota
- Kingdom: Animalia
- Phylum: Arthropoda
- Class: Insecta
- Order: Lepidoptera
- Family: Immidae
- Genus: Imma
- Species: I. albifasciella

Binomial name
- Imma albifasciella (Pagenstecher, 1900)

Synonyms
- Tortricomorpha albifasciella Pagenstecher, 1900; Tortricomorpha monodesma Lower, 1903

Species of moth

Imma albifasciella is a moth in the family Immidae. It was described by Arnold Pagenstecher in 1900. It is found on the Bismarck Archipelago and in Australia, where it has been recorded from Queensland.

The wingspan is about 20 mm. The forewings are dark ochreous fuscous with a nearly straight snow-white line from the costa at three-fifths to the inner margin at two-thirds. The hindwings are black.
