= Imma platyxantha =

Scientific classification
- Domain: Eukaryota
- Kingdom: Animalia
- Phylum: Arthropoda
- Class: Insecta
- Order: Lepidoptera
- Family: Immidae
- Genus: Imma
- Species: I. platyxantha

Binomial name
- Imma platyxantha Turner, 1913

Species of moth

Imma platyxantha is a moth in the family Immidae. It was described by Alfred Jefferis Turner in 1913. It is found in Australia, where it has been recorded from Queensland.

The wingspan is about 20 mm. The forewings are pale fuscous, with large yellow-ochreous blotches and a small subcostal basal spot, as well as a large squarish blotch on the costa near the base, nearly touching a smaller spot on one-fourth of the dorsum. There is a second rounded spot on the costa before the middle, nearly touching a large squarish blotch on the mid-dorsum, as well as a spot on the costa at two-thirds and a triangular spot on the costa immediately before the apex. A dark fuscous terminal line does not extend to the tornus. The hindwings are dark fuscous.
