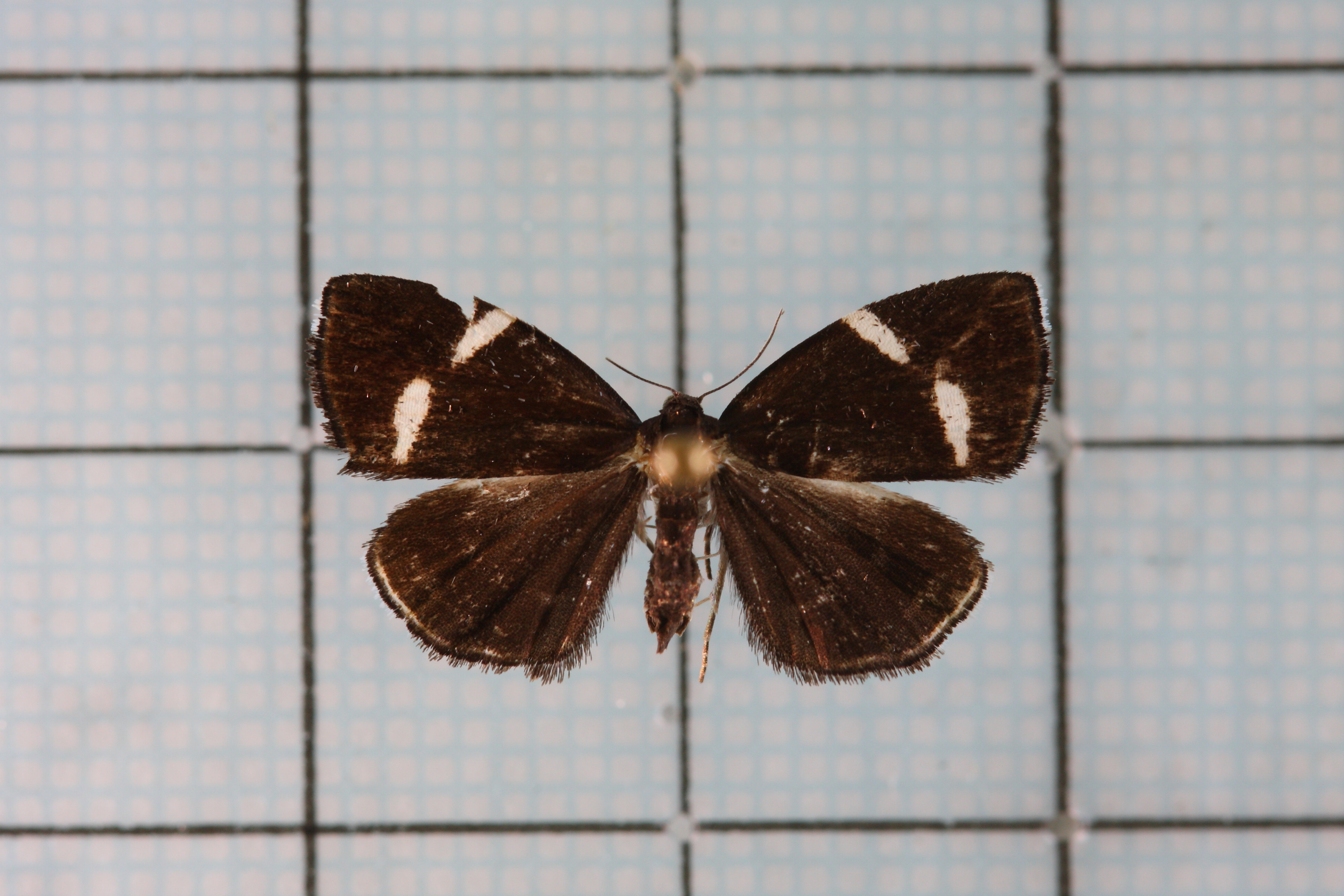
- Alampla arcifraga

Scientific classification
- Kingdom: Animalia
- Phylum: Arthropoda
- Clade: Pancrustacea
- Class: Insecta
- Order: Lepidoptera
- Family: Immidae
- Genus: Alampla; Diakonoff, 1978

= Alampla =

Genus of moths

Alampla is a genus of moths in the family Immidae.

== Species ==
- Alampla arcifraga (Meyrick, 1914)
- Alampla palaeodes (Meyrick, 1914)
