= Imma loxoscia =

Scientific classification
- Domain: Eukaryota
- Kingdom: Animalia
- Phylum: Arthropoda
- Class: Insecta
- Order: Lepidoptera
- Family: Immidae
- Genus: Imma
- Species: I. loxoscia

Binomial name
- Imma loxoscia Turner, 1913

Species of moth

Imma loxoscia is a moth in the family Immidae. It was described by Alfred Jefferis Turner in 1913. It is found in Australia, where it has been recorded from the Northern Territory and Queensland.

The wingspan is about 18–20 mm. The forewings are ochreous-whitish usually irrorated with grey and with a grey or fuscous line on the dorsum from the base to one-fourth, and a slightly waved oblique fuscous line from the costa just beyond the middle to the dorsum near the tornus. Beyond this, the ground colour is more brownish and usually with fuscous irroration. There is a dark fuscous terminal line narrowing beneath and not reaching the tornus, its anterior edge with minute dentations. The hindwings are dark grey.
