= Sthenistis =

Scientific classification
- Kingdom: Animalia
- Phylum: Arthropoda
- Class: Insecta
- Order: Lepidoptera
- Family: Immidae
- Genus: Sthenistis; Hampson, 1896
- Species: S. gyrtoniformis

Binomial name
- Sthenistis gyrtoniformis Hampson, 1896

Genus of moths

Sthenistis is a monotypic moth genus in the family Immidae. Its only species, Sthenistis gyrtoniformis, is found in Sri Lanka. Both the genus and species were described by George Hampson in 1896.

The wingspan is about 22 mm (0.87 in). The forewings are pale brown, thickly marked with short dark brown streaks in the interspaces, the inner margin paler, also the outer area except towards the costa. There are traces of an antemedial line appearing as a wedge-shaped mark on the inner margin and there is a dark speck at the lower angle of the cell, with an obscure oblique line from it to the inner margin. The hindwings are fuscous brown. Females have broader forewings, with the inner and outer areas prominently paler.
