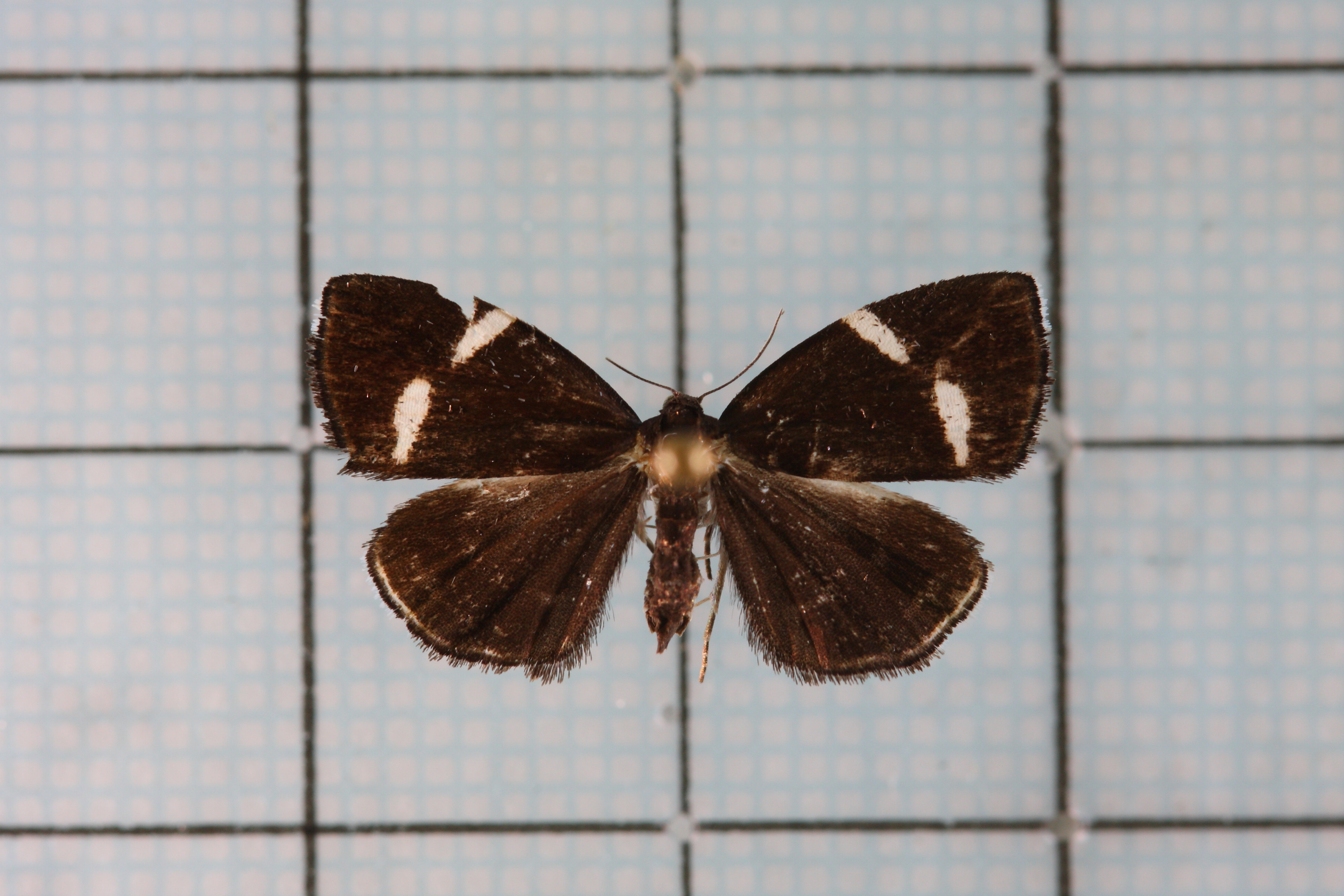
- Alampla arcifraga (Meyrick, 1914) from Taiwan

Scientific classification
- Domain: Eukaryota
- Kingdom: Animalia
- Phylum: Arthropoda
- Class: Insecta
- Order: Lepidoptera
- Infraorder: Heteroneura
- Clade: Eulepidoptera
- Clade: Ditrysia
- Clade: Apoditrysia
- Superfamily: Immoidea; Common, 1979
- Family: Immidae; Common, 1979

Genera
- Alampla; Birthana; Bryonympha; Bursadella; Imma; Loxotrochis; Moca; Ptochaula; Scaptesylomima; Sthenistis

= Immidae =

Superfamily of moths

Immoidea is a superfamily of pantropical moths containing only the family Immidae comprising ten genera with around 250 species, over half of them in the genus Imma. Many are brightly coloured and diurnal. The position of this group is currently uncertain within the group Obtectomera . The larvae feed on the leaves of dicotyledons and conifers including Podocarpus (Dugdale et al. 1999).

== Sources ==
- Firefly Encyclopedia of Insects and Spiders, edited by Christopher O'Toole, ISBN 1-55297-612-2, 2002
