= Ceballos =

- Place of origin: Spain

Ceballos is a Spanish toponymic surname. A variant is Cevallos. Notable people with the name include:

- Andrés Ceballos (born 1992), Spanish singer and songwriter
- Antonio Ceballos Atienza (1935–2022), Spanish Roman Catholic prelate
- Bernardino de Ceballos, Spanish Governor of New Mexico between 1614 and 1618
- Brayan Ceballos (born 2001), Colombian footballer
- Camilo Ceballos (born 1984), Colombian footballer
- Carlos Ceballos (born 1981), Colombian footballer
- Cedric Ceballos (born 1969), American basketball player
- Ciriaco Ceballos (1764–1816), Spanish sailor, explorer and cartographer
- Cristian Ceballos (born 1992), Spanish footballer
- Cristobal Ceballos (1916 –1989), Spanish footballer
- Dani Ceballos (born 1996), Spanish footballer
- Daniela Ceballos (born 1993), Chilean footballer
- Diego Ceballos (born 1980), Argentine footballer
- Emma Ceballos (born 2010), Argentine rhythmic gymnast
- Fernando Ceballos (1909–1991), Spanish footballer
- Francisco de Ceballos (died c. 1571), Spanish composer
- Gerardo Ceballos (born 1958), Mexican biologist, ecologist, and conservationist
- Hilda Ceballos (born 1956), Mexican politician
- Isabel Ceballos (born 1979), Colombian swimmer
- Jacqueline Ceballos (born 1925), American feminist activist
- Jose Ceballos (born 1963), American political aide, Government Affairs Director for National Air Traffic Controllers Association
- José Ceballos, Spanish military officer from the Venezuelan War of Independence
- José Luis Ceballos (born 1953) Argentine footballer
- José María Ceballos (born 1968), Spanish footballer who played as goalkeeper
- Juan Bautista Ceballos (1811–1859), interim president of Mexico in 1853
- Juan Carlos Ceballos (born 1983), Spanish footballer
- Leonor Watling (born Leonor Ceballos Watling), Spanish film actress and singer
- Lucas Ceballos (footballer, born 1987), Argentine footballer currently playing for Club Atlético Mitre
- Lucas Ceballos (footballer, born 1988), Argentine footballer who most recently played for Defensores Unidos
- Lucas Ceballos (footballer, born 1990), Argentine footballer currently playing for Estudiantes La Rioja
- Luis Ceballos (footballer) (born 1964), Chilean footballer and manager
- Luis Ceballos y Fernández de Córdoba (1896–1967), Spanish forest engineer and botanist
- Macarena Ceballos (born 1995), Argentine swimmer
- Marcelo Ceballos (born 1972), Argentine footballer
- Marvin Ceballos (born 1992), Guatemalan footballer
- Matias Ceballos (born 1984), Italian Argentinian footballer
- Matilde Ceballos (born 1957), Panamanian weightlifter
- Nathalys Ceballos (born 1990), Puerto Rican handball player
- Pedro Ceballos (born 1990), Venezuelan freestyle wrestler
- Remigio Ceballos (born 1963), Venezuelan military officer
- Rodrigo de Ceballos (c.1525–c.1581), Spanish composer
- Sebastián Ceballos (born 1992), Chilean handball player
- Sergio Ceballos (born 1994), Mexican footballer
- Zoila Ceballos, Dominican beauty pageant titleholder, model, and actress

== See also ==
- Cevallos (surname)
- Zeballos
