= Zeballos =

Zeballos may refer to:

== Places ==
=== Vancouver Island, Canada ===
- Zeballos, British Columbia, a village
  - Zeballos Water Aerodrome, an aerodrome
- Zeballos Inlet, an inlet
- Zeballos River
- Zeballos Peak, a mountain
- Zeballos Lake

=== Paraguay ===
- Zeballos Cué, a barrio in Asunción, Paraguay

== People with the surname ==
- Carlos Zeballos, Canadian soccer player
- Emilio Zeballos (born 1992), Uruguayan footballer
- Estanislao Zeballos (1854–1923), Argentine politician
- Exequiel Zeballos (born 2002), Argentine footballer
- Federico Zeballos (born 1988), Bolivian tennis player
- Fernando de Zeballos (1732–1802), Spanish priest and theologian
- Horacio Zeballos (born 1985), Argentine tennis player
- Ignacia Zeballos Taborga (1831–1904), Bolivian war heroine
- Joaquín Zeballos (born 1996), Uruguayan footballer
- Luis Zeballos (born 1985), Argentine footballer
- Noelia Zeballos (born 1994), Bolivian tennis player
- Pablo Zeballos (born 1986), Paraguayan footballer
- Sergio Zeballos (born 1987), Bolivian football manager
- Vicente Zeballos (born 1963), Peruvian politician
- Washington Zeballos (born 1954), Peruvian politician

== See also ==
- Ceballos
- Cevallos
