= SS Catala =

Canadian coastal passenger and cargo steamship

Coordinates: 46°56′38.00″N 124°7′19.99″W

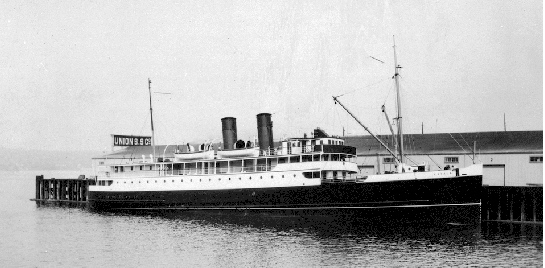
- Catala in Vancouver, 1925

History

Canada
- Name: Catala
- Namesake: Magin Catalá
- Owner: Union Steamship Company, 1925–1960; Sannie Transportation Company, 1960–1965
- Port of registry: Vancouver, British Columbia
- Builder: Coaster Construction Co., Montrose
- Yard number: 123
- Launched: 25 February 1925
- Identification: ON 152822
- Fate: Wrecked, 1 January 1965

General characteristics
- Type: Passenger ship
- Tonnage: 1,476 GRT; 851 registered tons
- Length: 229 ft (70 m)
- Beam: 37.1 ft (11.3 m)
- Depth of hold: 18.4 ft (5.6 m)
- Speed: 14 knots (26 km/h; 16 mph) (maximum)
- Capacity: 267 passengers (licensed); 300 tons cargo

SS Catala was a Canadian coastal passenger and cargo steamship built in Scotland in 1925, for service with the Union Steamship Company of British Columbia. In 1927 the ship became a total loss after stranding on reef, but was recovered and returned to service. Retired in 1958, Catala was later used as a floating hotel until wrecked on the Washington State coast in 1965.

== Nomenclature ==
Catala was named after Catala Island, which is at the entrance of Esperanza Inlet on the west coast of Vancouver Island. Catala Island had in turn been named in honour of Catholic missionary Fr. Magin Catalá, who was at Santa Cruz de Nuca on Vancouver Island in 1793.

== Design and construction ==
Catala was built by the Coaster Construction Company of Montrose, Scotland, in 1925 for the Union Steamship Company of British Columbia Ltd. The ship was similar to the Cardena, which was also owned by Union Steamship. Catala was 229 feet (70 m) long, with a beam of 37.1 feet (11.3 m) and depth of hold of 18.4 feet (5.6 m). The ship was licensed to carry 267 passengers, with stateroom capacity for 120 persons and steerage bunks for 48. Catala had a cargo capacity of 300 tons, including a refrigerated chamber for 40 tons of boxed fish.

Catala was launched on February 24, 1925. The ship was delivered from Scotland to Vancouver under Captain James Findlay, who had brought other steamships out from Scotland for the Union Steamship Company.

== Union Steamship career ==
Catala began her first voyage for the company on July 28, 1925, steaming north from Vancouver to Prince Rupert and the Skeena and Nass rivers. Like her sister ship, the Cardena, Catala spent most of her operating career from 1925 to 1958 on the British Columbia Coast, carrying coastal freight and passengers.

== Grounding on Sparrowhawk Reef ==
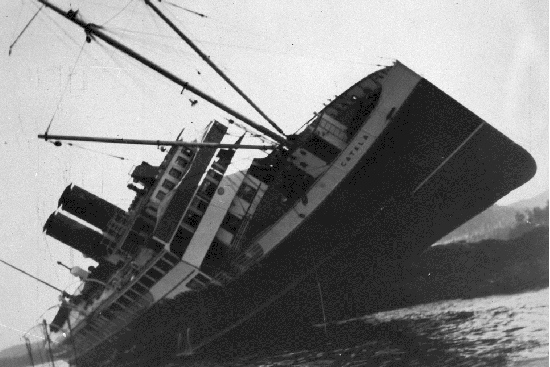
Catala aground on Sparrowhawk Reef, off the coast of British Columbia some time between November 8 and December 5, 1927

On November 8, 1927, at 1:00 pm, on a south-bound trip originating from Stewart, British Columbia, Catala had left Port Simpson bound for Prince Rupert through the southern channel on the inside of Finlayson Island. This channel is called Cunningham Passage.

With Chief Officer Ernest Sheppard on the bridge, the ship struck on Sparrowhawk Reef. The reef was reported to have been marked with a warning buoy. Later, during an inquiry into the incident, glaring sunlight conditions were found to have had some role in reducing visibility. Captain Alfred E. Dickson ordered the lifeboats lowered immediately, and with the aid of local people of the First Nations and their canoes, all passengers were taken off the ship and reached safety at Port Simpson, without loss.

The depth of water over the reef ranged from 23 feet (7.0 m) at high tide to only 7 feet (2.1 m) at low tide. Catala was held at a 45 degree angle between two pillars of rock. So much of the ship jutted out unsupported in the air that there was a fear the ship might break in two. The ship had been built with a double bottom, which helped keep the water out of the hold. Efforts by tugs, specifically Salvage Princess, Cape Scott, and, from Vancouver, Salvage King, to bring off the ship failed, even though the ship had been lightened by off-loading cargo into a smaller service ship. The company gave up the ship as lost, and abandoned her to the insurance underwriters, who then assumed responsibility for the salvage efforts. The company management did state that they would take the ship back if she could be brought off the reef.

Eventually, by incrementally blasting out the rock pillars, and patching the holes in the hull as blasting proceeded, the salvage crew was able to free the ship by December 5, 1927. The salvors took the ship to a temporary anchorage about a mile away, and thereafter to Prince Rupert. Eventually Catala was brought south to Vancouver, where at a cost of $175,000 the ship was repaired. The repair was supervised by W .D. McLaren, who had been in charge of Coaster Construction in Scotland when Catala was built, and had since relocated to Vancouver. On March 30, 1928, Catala resumed her weekly sailing schedule out of Vancouver, again under the command of Capt. Dickson.

== Later career ==
In 1958 she was sold to new owners in British Columbia for use as a fish-buying ship. In Seattle's Century 21 Exposition she was a floating hotel (boatel) moored on the Seattle waterfront. Later in 1962 she was towed to California and used as a floating restaurant. In 1963 she was brought back north to Ocean Shores, Washington and used as a boatel again until she was driven aground by a storm on New Year's Day 1965.

== Scrapping ==
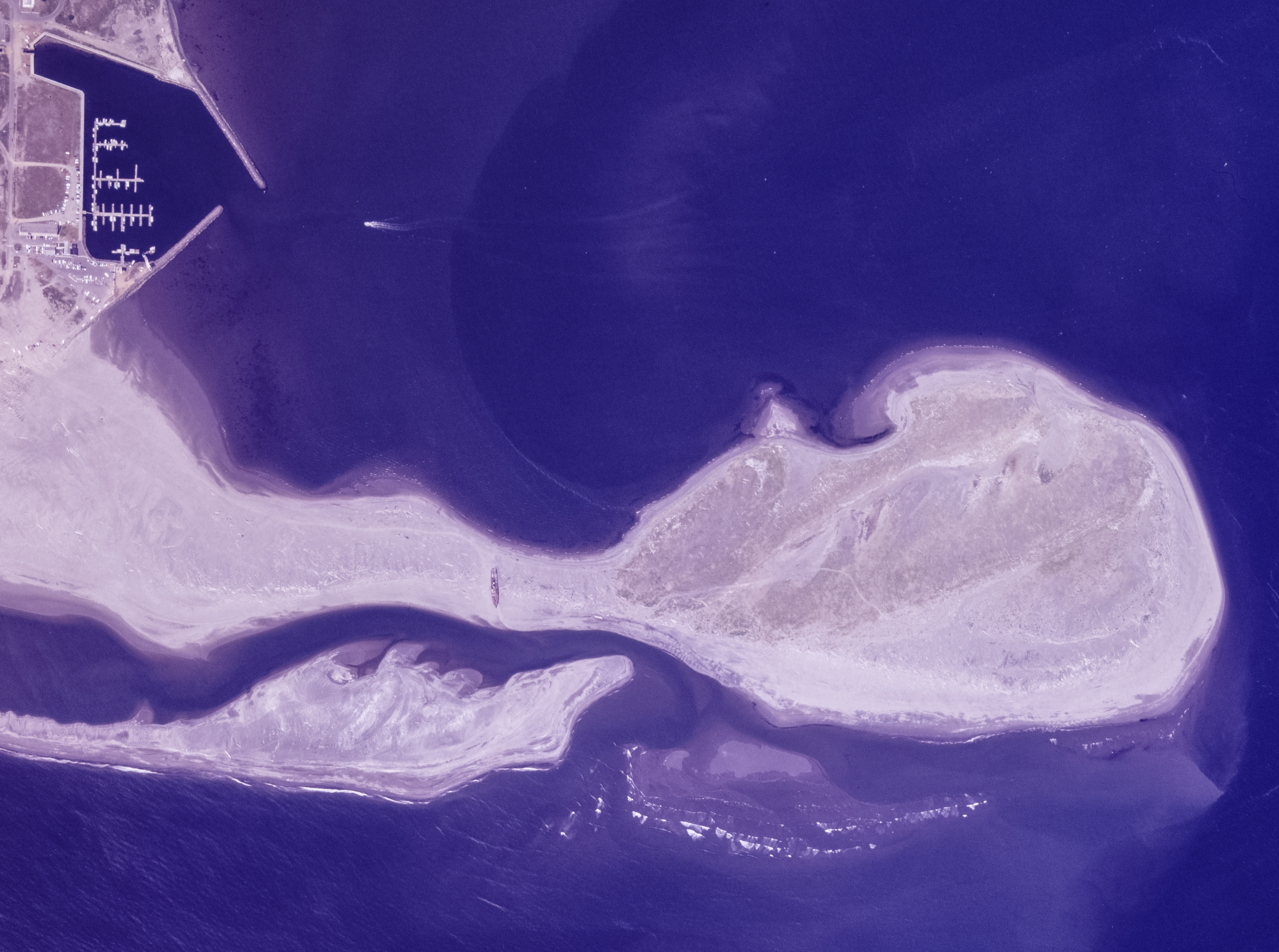
Damon Point, July 1974; ship remains are visible bottom-left of center.

Following her grounding, efforts to re-float Catala failed, and the wreck was left to decay at the beach on Damon Point, Washington. Over the years she was vandalized and pillaged, and in the late 1980s a girl fell through a rusted portion of her deck, breaking her back. Her family sued the State of Washington, which in turn ordered the wreck cut up. Catala was cut down to sand level and buried, until a series of winter storms unburied the wreckage in the late 1990s.

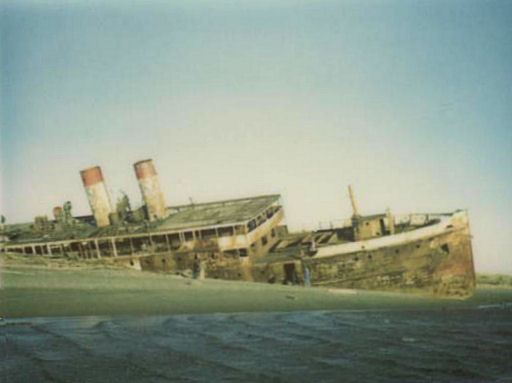
Catala aground in 1976

Subsequent storms gradually exposed more of the hull, and in April 2006, a beachcomber noticed that oil was leaking from the wreck. The Department of Ecology cordoned off the wreck and removed 34,500 US gallons (131,000 L) of heavy fuel oil before scrapping the rest of the ship. Several endangered bird species nest in the area, including the snowy plover.
