= Ehattesaht First Nation =

Nuu-chah-nulth band government in British Columbia, Canada

- Band No. 634
- ʔiiḥatisatḥ činax̣int
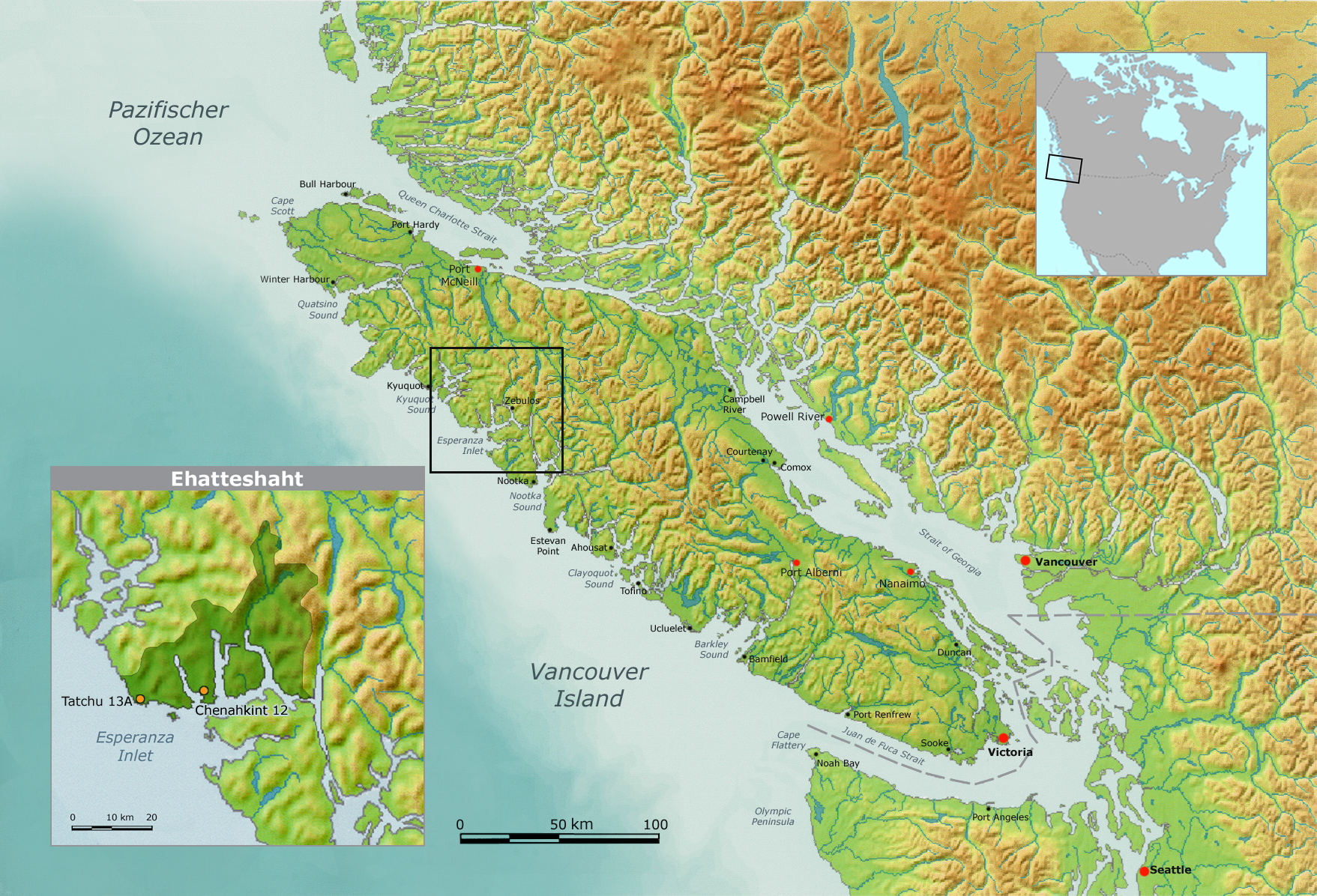
- People: Nuu-chah-nulth
- Headquarters: Zeballos
- Province: British Columbia

Land
- Main reserve: Chenakint 12
- Land area: 1.39 km^{2} (0.54 sq mi)

Population (2025)
- On reserve: 107
- On other land: 60
- Off reserve: 401
- Total population: 568

Government
- Chief: Simon John
- Council: Ashley John; David Miller; Ernie Smith; Christina John

Tribal Council
- Nuu-chah-nulth Tribal Council

Website
- ehattesaht.com

The Ehattesaht First Nation (Nuu-chah-nulth: ʔiiḥatisatḥ činax̣int) is a First Nations government covering about 660 km^{2} (66,000 hectares) on the West Coast of Vancouver Island in British Columbia, Canada. It is a band that is one of the 14 Nuu-Chah-Nuulth Nations and is now a member of the Nuu-chah-nulth Tribal Council. In the modern-day, there are currently only 539 registered members as of October 2021. As of 2022, the British Columbia government states that there are only 52 speakers of their language.

== Origin ==
=== Geography ===
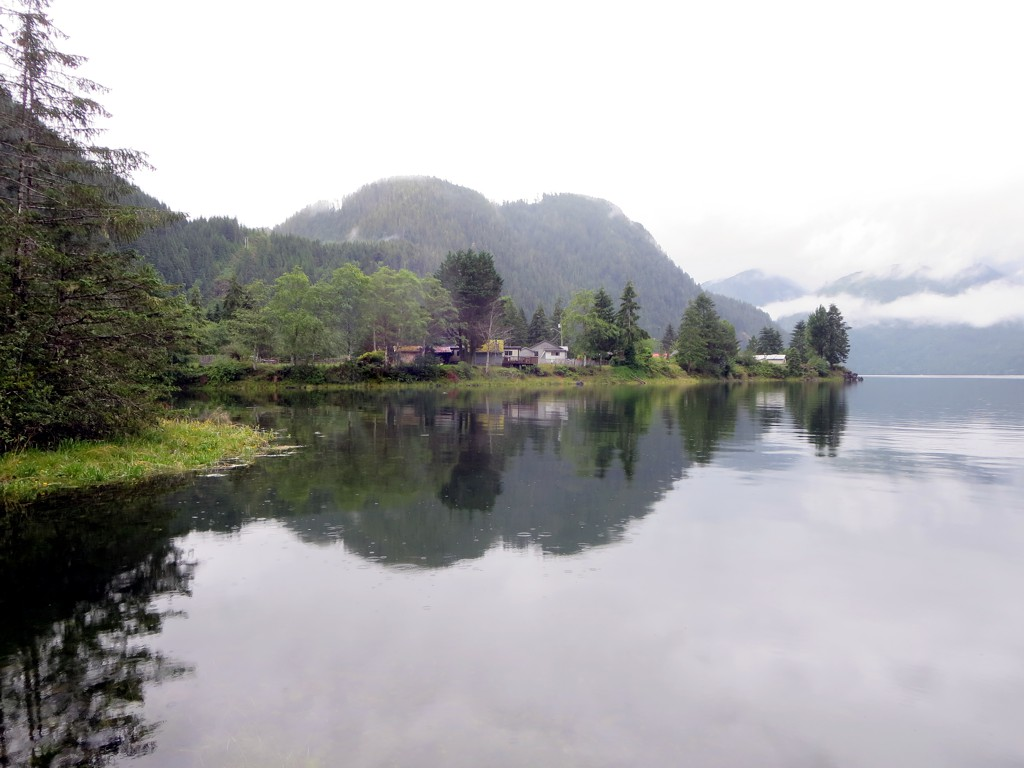
The scenic village of Zeballos is at the head of Zeballos Inlet on western Vancouver Island, British Columbia, Canada. A core portion of the land of the Ehattesaht First Nation

The Ehattesaht First Nations mostly covers the Esperanza Inlet, Zeballos Inlet, and Espinosa Inlet in which these communities would most live within these villages. A predominant village in this band would be maḥtiʕas, recognized as Queen's Cove, which would stand for "small village with houses" in their indigenous language.

=== History ===
Around the late 1700s would be when they first had colonial contact. The Nuu-chah-nulth First Nation, including the Ehattesaht, refer to the European explorers as mamałn̓i which essentially translates to "boat people". Most of their first encounters are recorded in the journal of John R. Jewitt, who would describe the indigenous members as " local savages". There are accounts from the Elders that speak about the raping and pillaging that occurred and the taking of their resources, which were mostly trees.

Similar to several other First Nations in Canada, they were forced to reserves and assimilate into the white, Christian culture that was dominant in Canadian society. As part of a federal program, many of the students would attend residential schools that would contribute of teaching the next generation to assimilate.

=== Language ===
The language they speak is the Nuu-chah-nulth language, which stands for "along the mountains and the sea" signified by the environment in which they lived. The Ehattesaht Nation, or also spelled as ʔiiḥatisatḥ in their indigenous language, stands for "big log coming down the river" which is likely due to its predominant logging.

They are currently in an effort to revitalize their language as most of the speakers are not fluent, which is already a seldom number. Only of the recorded 52 speakers, there are only 2 fluent speakers with the rest mostly able to understand the language while having difficulty speaking conversationally or even in its written language. In one of its efforts to maintain the language, the Ehattesaht Music Group was created in which music was constructed around phrases that the elders would commonly utilize.

== Culture ==
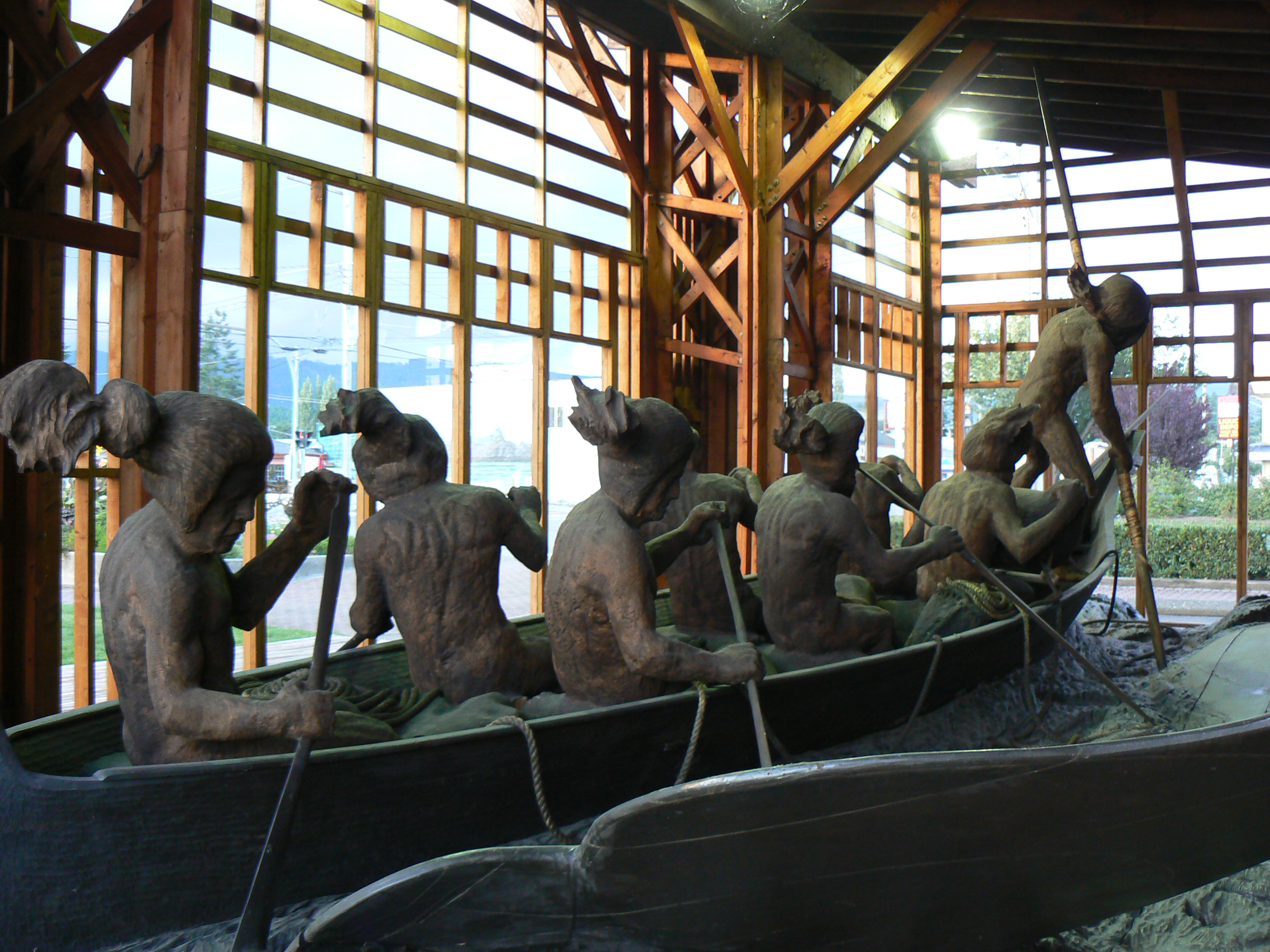
Whaler's Canoe Exhibit at Victoria Quay. A sculpture made of cedar is displayed at Royal British Columbia Museum, as a tribute to the fishing culture of the Nuu-Chul-Nath First Nations, including the Ehattesaht.

=== Fishing ===
The Ehattesaht First Nation was very prominently known to be a fishing community as much of they would commonly fish for salmon and halibut. In its pre-colonial times, the members would fish in between sites, the Village of Tatchu being the most common, and would travel through canoes that were crafted by them from cedar. The currency at the time would be based on dentalia shells, which they would retrieve from their fishing, as this would be.

Fishing continues to be an important tenet of their culture, as they would tun T'aaq-wihak fisheries, which would be one of the major legal battles to establish their Nations. T'aaq-wihak fisheries would be when the chiefs of all the Nuu-Chul-Naath Nations would grant permission to fish among these designated locations. Besides fishing, oyster farms and logging would be important parts of their economy, and to their First Nation, they were referred to as We'shuk and Aat'uu, respectively.

=== Festivals ===
Popular villages include Chenahkint and Tatchu which became the locations of large celebrations, such as potlatches. This would be a ceremonial tradition in which they would gather all of the village for a large feast, spiritual dances, and several artistic demonstrations. For the Nuu-chah-nulth First Nations in particular, it would also be a naming celebration and to honor a girl's transition into womanhood. It would span over several days and be important in the establishing powers in the fishing territories as well.

=== Adoption ===
The Nuu-Chah-Nulth also have a traditional adoption process in which they would be guided by the elder to push forward their continued culture. The program is part of the Nuu-chah-nulth Usma Family and Child Services; the word "usma" is a Nuu-chah-nulth word that roughly translates into "precious ones". This government agency was created in response to residential schools and the Sixties Scoop in which the Canadian government enabled child welfare authorities to take away the children from First Nation parents to foster homes, which were predominantly run by white families. In an effort to restore their culture and identity, this government agency would replace the British Columbia agency (Ministry of Children and Family Development) and instead would share the teachings from Elders, be cared by members of the band, and be given the opportunity to grow in the community.

== Government ==
The Ehattesaht Administration Department is tasked with overseeing all its social services which include youth programs, reception services, mental health programs, and a department of Language and Culture Research, Revitalization, and Planning. They would also be tasked to oversee the fisheries, logging, and forestry.

Logging continues to be an important tenet of their society as shown by the May 2014 decision by the British Columbia Supreme Court Ehattesaht First Nation v British Columbia (Forests, Lands, and Natural Resource Operations). This legal issue concerned the aboriginal rights of the Ehattesaht government to be consulted on any decisions made on its territory, specifically resources that companies were eager to exploit. This court case investigated the incident in which the company Western Forest Products was granted, by the British Columbia federal government, to make use of 1 million m^3 of timber in the Ehattesaht territories.

In 2014, the Ehattesaht First Nation purchased the Mid Island Ice and Packing company to expand their fishing rights. This provided a major advantage of commercializing their fishing as this purchase allowed them to move fresh fish into the markets in a matter of hours. This matter was achieved and compounded after the British Columbia Supreme Court granted them the fishing rights in the area in a 2009 decision. This was a matter of providing conservation to the fish ecosystem while still being able to be a major portion of their economy; conservation is an important tenet of their culture as signified by their principle hishukish ts'awalk which translates to "everything is one; everything is connected".

== Covid-19 ==
The Ehattesaht First Nation ended up being a hard-hit community, which was only compounded by the fact the spike in covid cases occurred while the community was facing a four-day power outage. The chief, Simon John, would move resources to provide the closest affected with medical services, but those actions can only be taken so far considering that the closest hospital, North Island Hospital, would be a 3-hour commute by car. Although difficult for the First Nation, it put a spotlight and emphasis on the lack of access to resources such as health care and hydro and internet connections.

== See also ==
- Nuu-chah-nulth
- Nuu-chah-nulth language
- Ehatisaht
