= Lucas Ceballos =

Lucas Ceballos may refer to:

- Lucas Ceballos (footballer, born 1987), currently playing for Club Atlético Colón
- Lucas Ceballos (footballer, born 1988), most recently played for Defensores Unidos
- Lucas Ceballos (footballer, born 1990), currently playing for Andino Sport Club
