= Zeballos Inlet =

Inlet in Canada

Coordinates: 49°56′37″N 126°48′36″W

Zeballos Inlet is an extension of Esperanza Inlet in the North Island region of Vancouver Island, Canada. Though inland relative to the outer coast, it is part of the Pacific Ocean as are other inlets on the west coast of Vancouver Island. At the head of the inlet are the Zeballos River and the village municipality of Zeballos, which was founded as a gold-mining town.

== Name origin ==
The inlet was named by Alessandro Malaspina, after a lieutenant from his crew, Ciriaco Ceballos, who explored this inlet in 1791 (Ceballos and Cevallos being other spellings of Zeballos in Spanish).

== See also ==
- Zeballos (disambiguation)
- Cevallos (disambiguation)
