= Elgin Community College =

Community college in Elgin, Illinois, US

- Type: Public community college
- Established: January 10, 1949; 77 years ago
- Accreditation: HLC
- Endowment: $11.79 million (2024)
- President: Peggy Heinrich
- Total staff: 1,105
- Students: 10,461
- Location: Elgin, Illinois, U.S. 42°01′05″N 88°19′20″W
- Colors: Blue & white
- Nickname: Spartans
- Sporting affiliations: NJCAA; Illinois Skyway Conference
- Mascot: Spartacus
- Website: www.elgin.edu

Elgin Community College (ECC) is a public community college in Elgin, Illinois. It was founded in 1949 as part of Elgin Area School District U46. Community College District 509 was formed 17 years later in 1966, a year after Illinois legislators created the Illinois Community College System. Most of the District is in Kane County with portions in DeKalb, Cook, McHenry, and DuPage. The 360-square-mile (930 km^{2}) District serves 300,000 people, 11,000 businesses, four public school districts, and 15 high schools.

== History ==
Elgin Community College was founded on January 10, 1949, in Elgin, Illinois. A wing of Elgin High School housed the college, which was once a part of Public School District U-46. . Gilbert I. Renner was appointed dean in July 1950 and in December 1959, the college relocated from the high school to Renner Hall on East Chicago Street in Elgin.

The Junior College Act passed by the Illinois General Assembly on July 15, 1965, resulted in the formation of Junior College District 509. On April 12, 1966, the U-46 board approved to divest itself of ECC, allowing the college to become independent. The first District 509 board election, held on June 4, 1966, heralded the college's first seven elected trustees: Robert Hoffer, John Eshelman, Harry Blizzard, Paul Bolger, Richard Gromer, Joseph McCarthy, and Frieda Simon.

ECC continued to expand with a number of educational sites across its district, including the annexation of Public School District 300 into District 509. Other milestones included the implementation of ECC's first vocational/technical program—nursing—in June 1965; and earning accreditation from the North Central Association in March 1968.

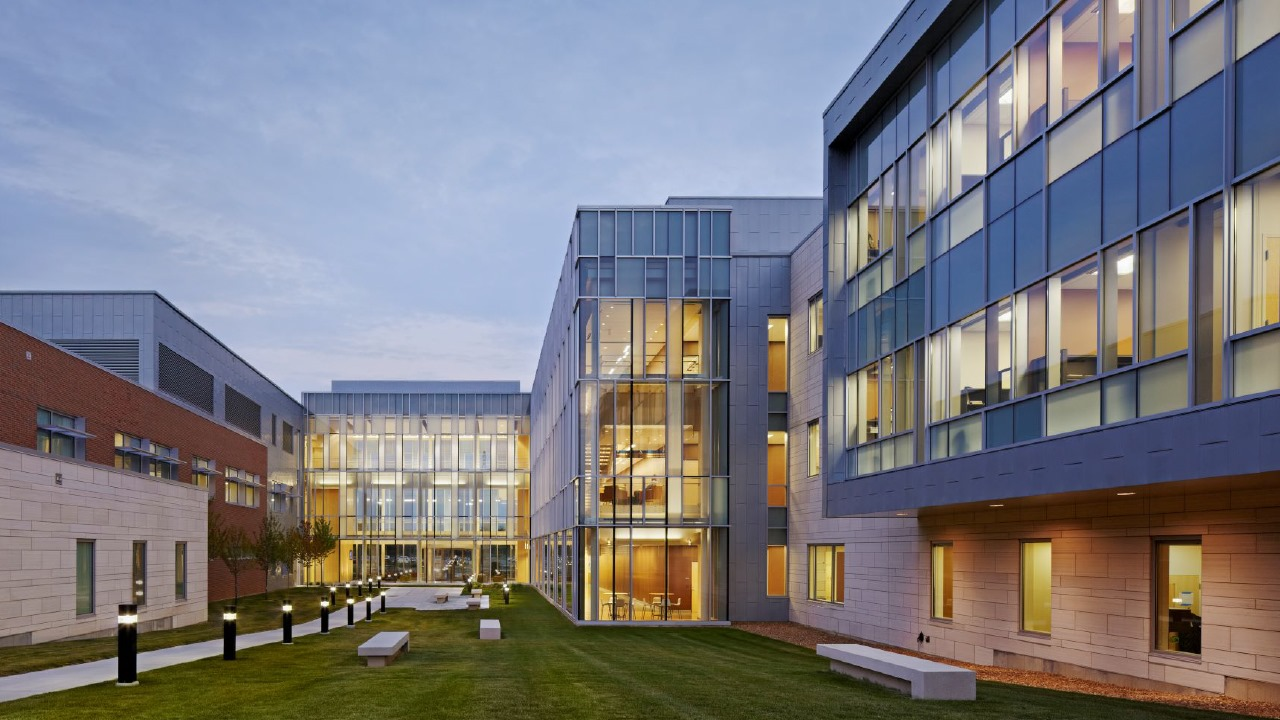
Spartan Drive Campus in Elgin

To accommodate the needs of a growing college district, voters approved a referendum in April 1967 to purchase 100 acres from the city of Elgin for approximately $51,000 to build a new campus. After the Illinois Board of Higher Education approved the project, the groundbreaking took place on December 24, 1968, with the first phase of the campus, addressed as 1700 Spartan Drive in Elgin, opened in September 1970. While the campus continued to grow, additions included a gymnasium and an Industrial Training Center. ECC reached a 10-year agreement with the city of Elgin in 1982 to renovate the site of a former Sears store in downtown Elgin for a second campus. The new Fountain Square Campus opened for classes in January 1983. Programs housed in this new campus included GED® test credential courses and English as a second language and adult education programs.

On April 7, 2009, voters approved a $178 million bond referendum for the college to build a new academic library and learning center, health careers center, and regional public safety training facility as part of its Facilities Master Plan. Part of the plan would involve closure of the Fountain Square Campus and relocating its programs to the Spartan Drive Campus and into a renovated building on Renner Drive that previously consisted of two light industrial buildings. Ground was broken for these new buildings in spring 2010.

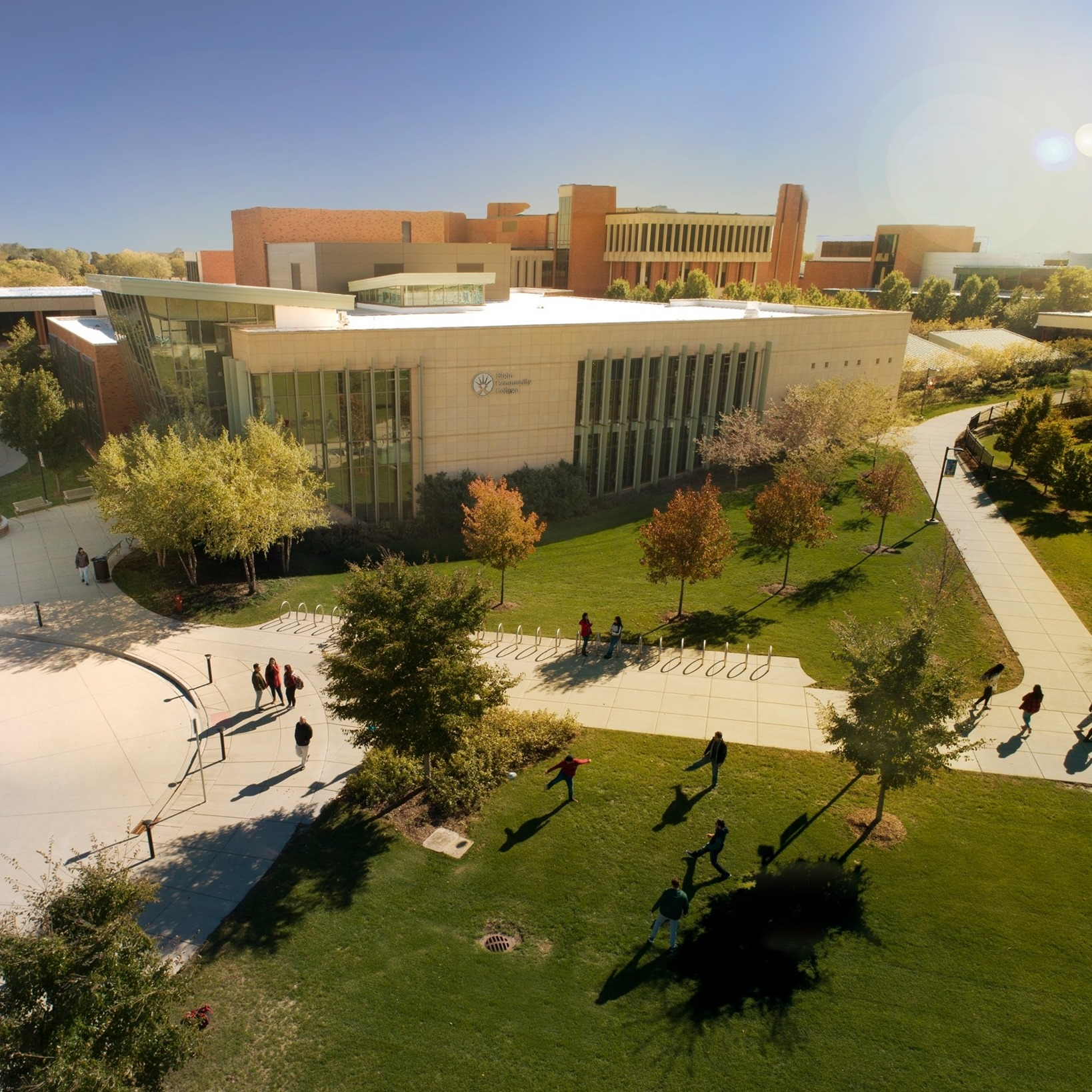
Spartan Drive Campus in Elgin

First to be completed was the new multipurpose classroom building (now Building K) on January 26, 2011. The Renner Academic Library and Learning Resources (Building C) opened on January 27, 2012, and the health and life sciences building (Building A) opened on March 15, 2012. Other notable improvements included renovation of the original campus, including the Jobe Lounge; cafeteria; classrooms and laboratories; Building M, including the construction of a new greenhouse; and parking lots and streets. Other changes to the Spartan Drive Campus included the extension of Spartan Drive to connect with Randall Road to the west, which opened on August 15, 2008. Spartan Drive from McLean Boulevard to Renner Drive reopened on June 8, 2010, following an extensive reconstruction project.

On May 21, 2014, ECC broke ground for the Education and Work Center at the Hanover Square Plaza, 6704 Barrington Road, in Hanover Park. The center is a partnership between Harper College, the village of Hanover Park, the Chicago-Cook Workforce partnership, and the state of Illinois. It offers day and evening classes, ESL, adult basic education, and career skills development. The center opened on August 21, 2014.

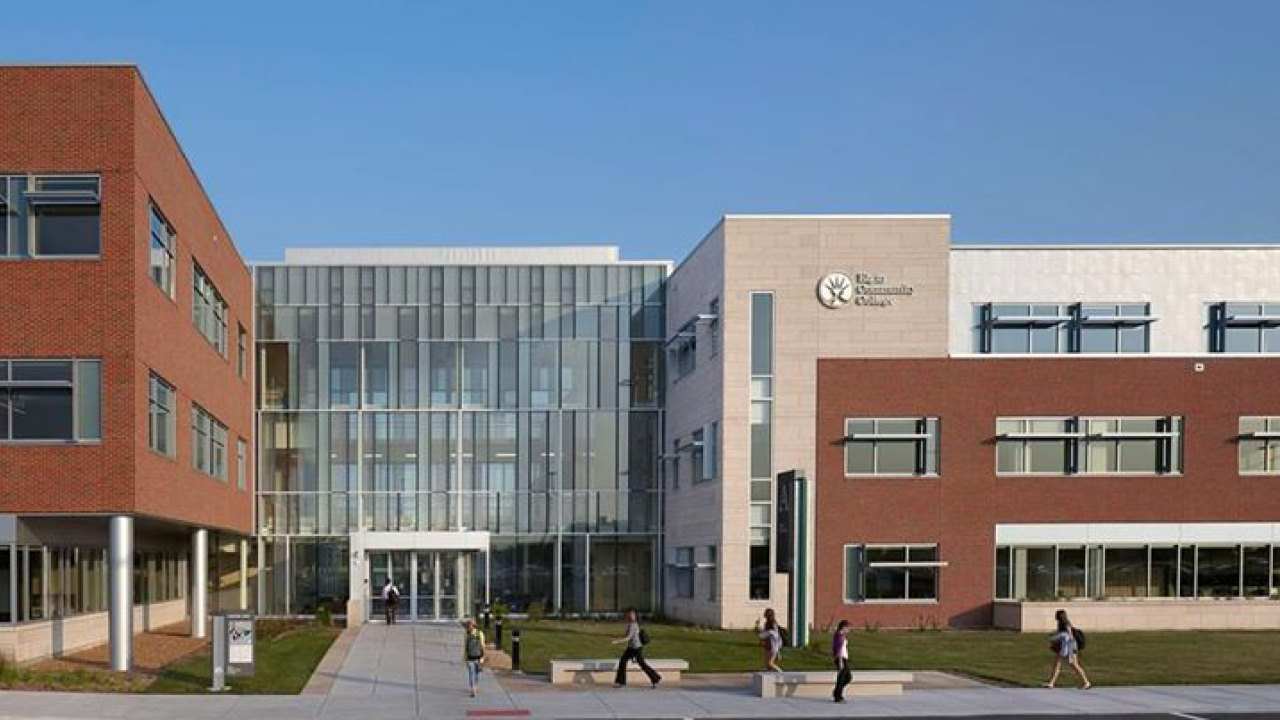
Spartan Drive Campus in Elgin

Elgin Community College completed the final project of its Facilities Master Plan, the Elgin Community College Center for Emergency Services, in September 2016. The 120-acre property features classrooms for public safety communications, emergency medical services, criminal justice, and fire science, as well as bays for training on police and fire equipment and fire truck storage. The center also includes a three-story burn tower and ponds for rescue diving and firefighter training.

=== Presidents ===
1. Gilbert I. Renner (1966-1971)
2. Robert L. Appel Jr. (1971-1975)
3. Mark L. Hopkins (1975-1982)
4. Searle F. Charles (1982-1987)
5. Paul Heath (1987-1994)
6. Roy Flores (1994-1998)
7. Michael S. Shirley (1998-2006)
8. David Sam (2007–2024)
9. Peggy Heinrich (2024-Present)

In July 2024, Dr. Peggy Heinrich was appointed Interim President of Elgin Community College (ECC), and in January 2025, she became ECC’s ninth president and the first woman to hold the role. She had spent more than 18 years in administrative positions at ECC before ascending to the presidency. Her leadership emphasizes advancing student success, strengthening workforce-oriented programs in fields such as manufacturing and technology, and expanding community partnerships while maintaining affordability and preparing graduates both for further education and entry into the workforce.

== Academics ==
As mandated by the Public Community College Act (110 ILCS 805), Elgin Community College offers courses in liberal arts and sciences and general education; adult education courses; and courses in occupational, semi-technical, or technical fields leading directly to employment.

ECC's university transfer options include Associate in Arts, Associate in Engineering Science, Associate in Fine Arts (Art or Music), Associate in Liberal Studies, and Associate in Science degrees. The transfer program incorporates more than 25 major fields of study. The college also offers The Center for Advanced Studies, which consists of partnerships with Northern Illinois University, Judson University, Roosevelt University, and Columbia College of Missouri. These institutions have space on ECC's campus and allow students to complete baccalaureate degrees at ECC, online, or at their respective campuses.

ECC's Career and Technical Education programs include more than 130 degrees and certificates, including an Associate of Applied Science degree. The college also offers adult and basic education; high school equivalency instruction and testing; citizenship preparation; English as a second language (ESL); and workforce development for employers.

ECC has specialized transfer partnerships with more than 30 colleges and universities covering more than 100 college majors. ECC also partners with more than 100 schools in the Illinois Articulation Initiative.

== Locations ==
ECC has four primary locations:

- Spartan Drive Campus in Elgin, Illinois

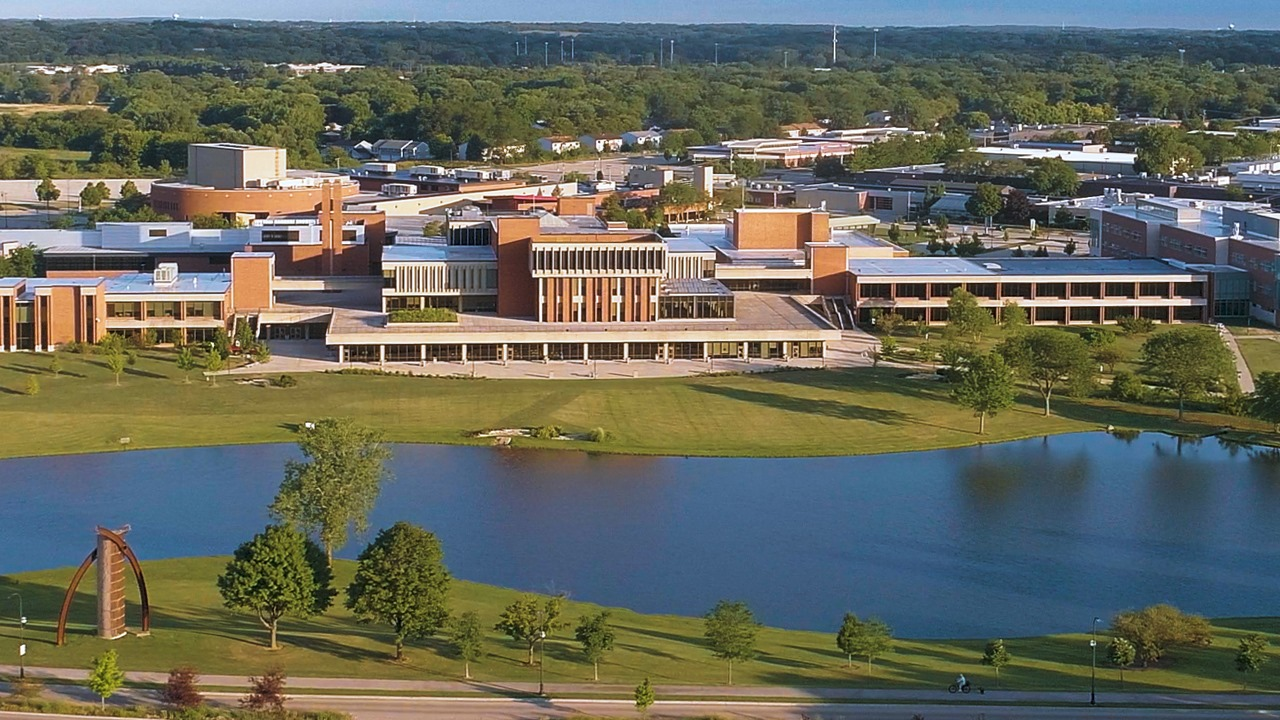
Spartan Drive Campus in Elgin

- Education and Work Center in Hanover Park, Illinois
- ECC Center for Emergency Services in Burlington, Illinois
- Streamwood Village Hall in Streamwood, Illinois

== Student life ==
ECC has approximately 20 clubs and organizations that provide students opportunities to get involved and express themselves outside of the classroom. These clubs and organizations include Black Student Achievers; Organization of Latin American Students; Phi Theta Kappa Honor Society; Student Government Association; and United Students of All Cultures.

Students also have the opportunity to participate in leadership programs that encourage community service and volunteering. Some program examples are Students Educationally Receiving Volunteer Experience (SERVE) and Spartan Leaders. Other programs have included The Big Event, in which students participated in service opportunities for different agencies and organizations throughout District 509.

=== Transportation ===
The main campus of Elgin Community College in Elgin is served by Pace. Routes 546 and 549 provide bus service from campus to downtown Elgin and other destinations connecting with Metra service on the Milwaukee District West Line at Elgin station.

== Arts and entertainment ==
The ECC Arts Center hosts touring artists and local theater and music productions in its two theaters—the 662-seat Blizzard Theatre and the more intimate 168-seat "black box" SecondSpace Theatre. Notable acts that have performed at the college include Victor Wooten, the touring production of “The Producers,” Arlo Guthrie, and the cast of “Jersey Boys.”

== Sports ==
Student athletes compete in regional and national tournaments in the National Junior College Athletic Association (NJCAA) and in the Illinois Skyway Conference. ECC's intercollegiate athletics offer students the opportunity to compete, develop skills, and acquire leadership and teamwork experiences.

Men's athletics teams: baseball, basketball, golf, soccer, tennis.

Women's athletics teams: basketball, soccer, softball, tennis, volleyball.

== Notable alumni ==
- Cristina Castro (1998) member of the Illinois Senate
- Kenneth Hawkinson, president of Kutztown University of Pennsylvania
- Daniel Henney, actor
- Sandro Miller, (2012) photographer
- Allen Skillicorn, member of the Illinois House of Representatives
- Michael D. Smigiel Sr., member of the Maryland House of Delegates

== See also ==
- Illinois Community College System
