= Kenneth Hawkinson =

American academic administrator and communication scholar

12th President of Kutztown University of Pennsylvania
- In office July 1, 2015 – July 5, 2025
- Preceded by: F. Javier Cevallos
- Succeeded by: Philip Cavalier

Personal details
- Born: Carpentersville, Illinois, U.S.
- Education: Western Illinois University (BA, MA); Southern Illinois University Carbondale (PhD)

Military service
- Branch/service: United States Army; Illinois National Guard

Kenneth S. Hawkinson is an American academic administrator and communication scholar who served as the 12th President of Kutztown University of Pennsylvania from 2015 to 2025. His term began on July 1, 2015 and ended on July 5, 2025 with the beginning of Phillip Cavalier's term.

== Early life and education ==
Hawkinson is a native of Carpentersville, Illinois. He earned a Bachelor of Arts degree in history and Master of Arts in Speech Communication from Western Illinois University. He then went on to earn his PhD in Speech Communication & Performance from Southern Illinois University Carbondale. As a Fulbright Scholar, Hawkinson taught abroad at the University of Ouagadougou in the West African nation of Burkina Faso. He also conducted research in African History and Folklore.

== Career ==
=== Military ===
Hawkinson served as a member of the Illinois National Guard and United States Army. As a Field Artillery Officer and Executive Officer for a Field Artillery Battery, he was called to active duty as an Infantry Officer in Germany. He was also a volunteer with the Peace Corps. In 2016, Hawkinson was inducted into the U.S. Army ROTC National Hall of Fame.

=== Education ===
Hawkinson was an assistant professor, associate professor, and professor of communication at Western Illinois University. He later worked as the provost, academic vice president, associate provost, and associate vice president for budget, planning and personnel. Hawkinson was selected as the 12th president of Kutztown University of Pennsylvania in 2015, succeeding F. Javier Cevallos.

Hawkinson's presidency has included guiding the university through the COVID-19 pandemic and subsequent associated challenges – including moving nearly all university functions online in Spring 2020. Hawkinson followed by committing to return to primarily in-person operations and classes the following academic year and beyond. This action included denying ADA accommodations to several faculty leading to a number of federal lawsuits which ultimately documented that Hawkinson's actions were violations of long-standing laws (most notably Oross v. Kutztown University, et al., No. 21-5032 E.D. Pa. 07/25/23 and Oross v. Kutztown University et al., No. 21-5032 E.D. Pa. 01/08/24).

Under Hawkinson, the KU Foundation completed the “Together, We’re Golden: The Campaign for Kutztown University” in 2023, raising a school-record $46,852,180 to create scholarships, bolster emergency funds and enhance student experiences.

Kutztown University’s overall full-time equivalency students rose in 2023 for the first time since 2010. 31% of incoming freshmen in Fall of 2023 were minority students.

=== Awards ===
Year	Organization	Award	Ref.
2016	United States Army	ROTC National Hall of Fame	
2016	Reading Eagle	Educator of the Year	
2017	Elgin Community College (ECC) Foundation	Distinguished Alumni Award	
2019	Child Promise	Estelle R. Richmond Leadership Award	
2019	Northampton Community College	Commencement Speaker	
2024	Elgin Community College (ECC) Foundation	Sensational 75 Award	
2024	Lehigh Valley Business	Top 100 Leaders of the Lehigh Valley	
