= Ehatisaht =

First Nations village in British Columbia

Coordinates: 49°52′35″N 126°51′10″W

Ehatisaht, also known as Ehatisaht Village and Ahateset, is a former First Nations village of the Nuu-chah-nulth people on northern Vancouver Island on the north shore of Esperanza Inlet. The native language is Nuučaan̓uɫ.

== See also ==
- Ehattesaht First Nation
