= Damon Point =

Former Washington State Park

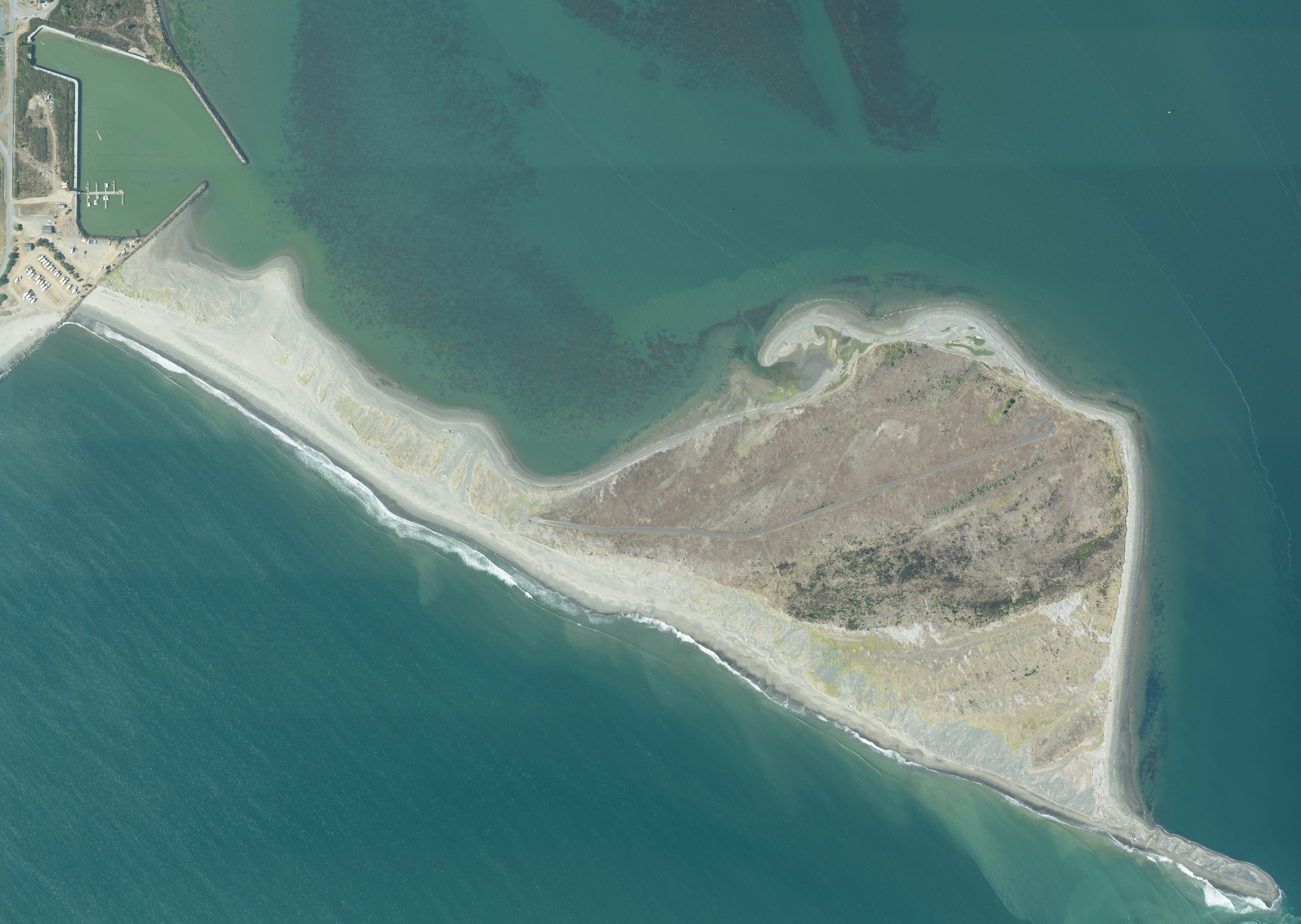
- Damon Point in August 2023
- Location: Grays Harbor, Washington
- Nearest city: Ocean Shores, Washington
- Coordinates: 46°56′32.73″N 124°6′38.64″W
- Elevation: 20 feet (6.1 m)
- Operator: Washington State Department of Natural Resources

Damon Point is a cape in Grays Harbor County, Washington and former Washington State Park. The park consisted of 61 acres (25 ha) at the southeastern tip of Ocean Shores Peninsula on a 1-mile (1.6 km) by 0.5-mile (0.80 km) piece of land jutting out into Grays Harbor. The Washington Department of Natural Resources completed a restoration project in 2018, supporting it as a bird habitat, especially for the threatened streaked horned lark, but also for other birds, including the snowy plover.

Between 1965-2007, the shipwreckage of SS Catala was located at Damon Point.

As of January 2025, public access to Damon Point is prohibited, in part due to tidal fluctuations which have trapped visitors.

== History ==
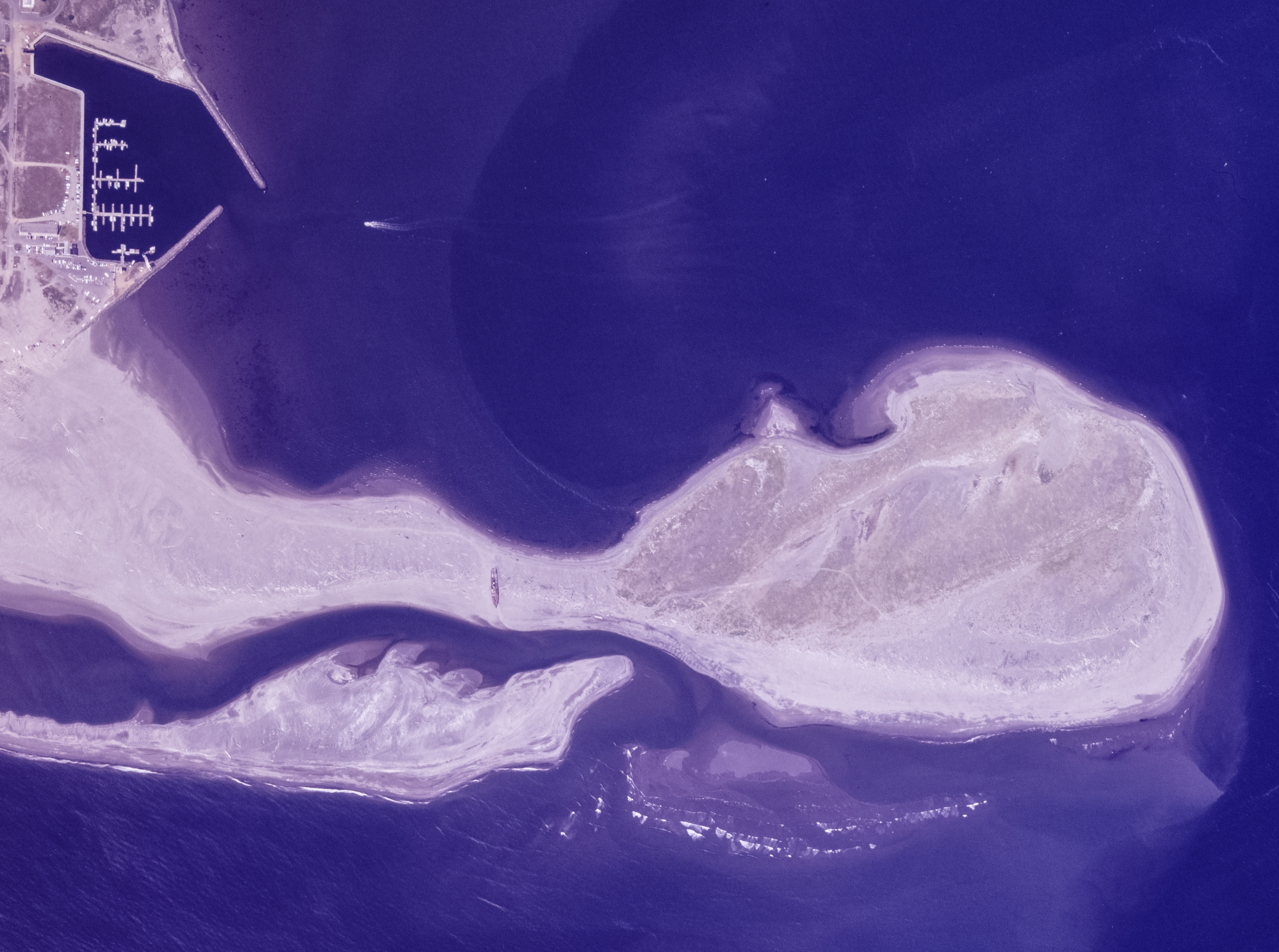
Damon Point, July 1974; SS Catala remains are visible bottom-left of center.

Damon Point was once separated from Ocean Shores by a water channel, however over time sediment from nearby currents created a land connection to the coastline, known as a tombolo. A 2 miles (3.2 km) road was paved to the tip of the formation, providing access to the former state park. Later, the road was destroyed in a storm and the land connection submerges under water during high tide in the winter.

In 2006, oil leaking from the wreckage of SS Catala was discovered at the beach and a significant cleanup effort by the Department of Ecology took place throughout the following year to remove it and other asbestos-containing materials.

Between 2015 and 2018, a $171,000 restoration project was completed at Damon Point. The project focused on habitat restoration for shorebirds, such as the streaked horned lark, and improving public access. Invasive species (including Scotch broom, shore pine and beach grass) on 50 acres (20 ha) of the land was replaced with native plants; and a kiosk and interpretive signs were installed.
