= Zeballos Lake =

Lake in British Columbia, Canada

- Location within Vancouver Island
- Coordinates: 50°04′49″N 126°44′24″W
- Lake type: Natural

Zeballos Lake is a lake on northern Vancouver Island in British Columbia, Canada. Its outlet is into the Nomash River.

== See also ==
- List of lakes of British Columbia
- Zeballos (disambiguation)#Places
