= Catala Island Marine Provincial Park =

Provincial park in British Columbia, Canada

- IUCN category II (national park)
- Location within Vancouver Island Location within British Columbia
- Interactive map of Catala Island Marine Provincial Park
- Location: Nootka Land District, British Columbia, Canada
- Nearest city: Port Alice, BC
- Coordinates: 49°50′09″N 127°03′29″W
- Area: 955 ha (2,360 acres)
- Established: July 13, 1995
- Governing body: BC Parks

Catala Island Marine Provincial Park is a provincial park in British Columbia, Canaded on the west coast of Vancouver Island at the mouth of Esperanza Inlet, between Kyuquot Sound (N) and Nootka Sound (S). The park is 955 ha. in size and was established in July 1995.

== Name origin ==
Catala Island, which is one of the islands comprising the park, was originally named Isla de Catala on a chart made in 1792 by Spanish explorer Dionisio Galiano. Galiano named it for Magin Catalá, a Franciscan who was serving as chaplain at the Spanish garrison at Nootka Sound at the time. Catala, who returned to California in 1794, was born in 1761 in Catalonia (Spain), and had arrived in Mexico in 1786. Serving 44 years as a missionary on the Spanish-American coast, he died in Santa Clara, California in 1830.
