= Francisco de Ceballos =

Spanish Renaissance composer

Francisco de Ceballos or Cevallos, Zavallos (died c. 1571) was a Spanish Renaissance composer. He was "maestro" at Burgos Cathedral from 1535 to his death in 1571.

== Works ==
Surviving works include a mass in the Cathedral of Zaragoza, diverse works in the Cathedral of Malaga, and Bogota.

== See also ==
Francisco belonged to a family of musicians, de Ceballos Cabanilla from Castile. His father Rodrigo preceded him as Maestro de Capilla at Burgos, and there was speculation in the 19th century that he was the brother of another Rodrigo, the composer Rodrigo de Ceballos (died 1581), but in fact he appears to have been his uncle.
