= Luis Zeballos =

Argentine footballer

Personal information
- Full name: Luis Alberto Zeballos
- Date of birth: 3 March 1985 (age 41)
- Place of birth: Los Polvorines, Argentina
- Position: Midfielder

Youth career
- Colegiales

Senior career*
Years	Team	Apps	(Gls)
2002–2012	Colegiales	254	(7)
2012–2017	Los Andes	149	(5)
2017–2018	Colegiales	19	(0)
2018–2019	Los Andes	8	(0)
2019–2022	Colegiales	0	(0)
- * Club domestic league appearances and goals as of 21:25, 12 September 2019 (UTC)

Luis Alberto Zeballos (born 3 March 1985) is an Argentine Retired professional footballer.

== Career ==
Colegiales were Zeballos' first club, with the midfielder remaining with them from 2002 up until 2012 whilst making two hundred and fifty-four appearances and scoring seven goals; across seasons in Primera C Metropolitana and Primera B Metropolitana. On 13 June 2012, Zeballos joined fellow third tier team Los Andes. He made his debut during a draw with Deportivo Morón on 5 August, which was one of thirty-six matches for the club in 2012–13; which he ended with goals versus Tristán Suárez and Atlanta. His third season ended with promotion to Primera B Nacional. He lasted three more years, taking his tally to one hundred and fifty-seven games.

Zeballos spent the 2017–18 Primera B Metropolitana back with Colegiales, prior to subsequently returning to Los Andes in June 2018. He made his second bow for the Lomas de Zamora team on 25 August against Independiente Rivadavia.

== Career statistics ==
As of 18 February 2019.

Appearances and goals by club, season and competition
Club	Season	League			Cup		Continental		Other		Total	
Club	Season	Division	Apps	Goals	Apps	Goals	Apps	Goals	Apps	Goals	Apps	Goals
Los Andes	2012–13	Primera B Metropolitana	36	2	0	0	—		0	0	36	2
Los Andes	2013–14	Primera B Metropolitana	32	2	3	0	—		0	0	35	2
Los Andes	2014	Primera B Metropolitana	18	0	0	0	—		0	0	18	0
Los Andes	2015	Primera B Nacional	40	1	4	0	—		0	0	44	1
Los Andes	2016	Primera B Nacional	16	0	0	0	—		0	0	16	0
Los Andes	2016–17	Primera B Nacional	7	0	1	0	—		0	0	8	0
Los Andes	Total		149	5	8	0	—		0	0	157	5
Colegiales	2017–18	Primera B Metropolitana	19	0	0	0	—		0	0	19	0
Los Andes	2018–19	Primera B Nacional	5	0	0	0	—		0	0	5	0
Career total			173	5	8	0	—		0	0	181	5

== Honours ==
Colegiales

- Primera C Metropolitana: 2007–08
