= Zeballos River =

River in Canada

Coordinates: 49°59′N 126°51′W

The Zeballos River is a river located on Vancouver Island in British Columbia. The river is up island and flows south into the north end of Zeballos Inlet, near the town of Zeballos. The river was named in relation to Zeballos Inlet, which was named by Spanish explorer Alessandro Malaspina for a crew member on his ship, Lt. Ciriaco Ceballos, who explored the inlet in 1791. It was discovered to be gold bearing before 1900 and has been mined.

== See also ==
- List of rivers of British Columbia
