= Zeballos, British Columbia =

Zeballos
- Village
- The Corporation of the Village of Zeballos
- Motto: "Golden Gate to the West Coast"
- Location of Zeballos in British Columbia Zeballos (British Columbia)
- Coordinates: 49°59′4″N 126°51′14″W
- Country: Canada
- Province: British Columbia
- Region: Vancouver Island
- Regional district: Strathcona
- Founded: 1930s
- Incorporated: 1952

Government
  - Governing body: Zeballos Village Council
  - Mayor: Bob Berthelotte

Area
  - Total: 1.45 km^{2} (0.56 sq mi)

Population (2021)
  - Total: 126
- Time zone: UTC−07:00 (PT)
- Waterways: Esperanza Inlet
- Climate: Cfb
- Website: Village of Zeballos

Zeballos (/zɛˈbɑːloʊs/; population: 126) is a village located on the northwest coast of Vancouver Island in British Columbia, Canada. Zeballos is now known for its ecotourism and sport fishing.

== Location and geography ==
Zeballos is a deep-sea port surrounded by rugged mountains and forests, located on the Zeballos River delta, at the end of Zeballos Inlet within the territory of the Ehattesaht Chinehkint First Nation. It is accessible from Highway 19, about a two and half hour drive north of Campbell River. Zeballos' position relative to nearby Nootka Sound and Kyuquot Sound make it a popular "jump-off" point for tourists and anglers. Other areas of interest include Nootka Island, Fair Harbour, a 35 km (22 mi) trip by unpaved road from Zeballos, and Brooks Peninsula Provincial Park.

== History ==
The eponymous inlet was named for Lt. Ciriaco Ceballos, a crew member aboard an early ship of explorer Alessandro Malaspina's expedition (1789-1794). The location of Zeballos remained relatively obscure until over 120 years later, when a mining camp by that name emerged due to a gold rush in the 1930s. The name became official as that of the local post office in 1946 and was incorporated as a village municipality in 1952. Although estimates vary, Zeballos may have had a population of over 5,000 during the peak of mining activity. Between 1938 and 1943, $13 million worth of gold bricks were shipped from Zeballos.

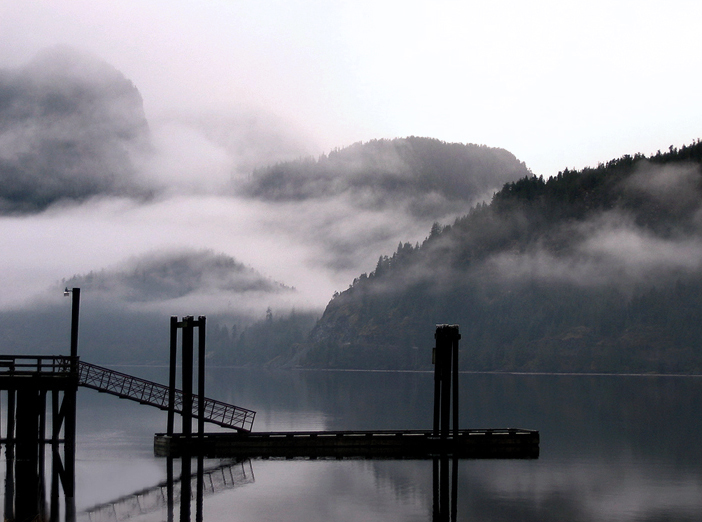
Zeballos harbour

With the onset of World War II, Zeballos lost significant numbers of its workforce to the Canadian Army. Eventually, the mines began to close. Although post-war efforts were made to begin production again, the set price of $35.00 an ounce made it uneconomical for the mines to continue operating. Within twenty years, the mines had closed for good.

In the 1950s, logging emerged as a promising new industry for the village. In 1964, an iron mine was established. Although the timber industry proved successful for the community, the mine shut its doors just five years after opening.

In 1964, the Good Friday earthquake and ensuing tsunami brought destruction to the small coastal community. Charles Ford, a young seaplane pilot and resident of Zeballos, wrote:

Downtown Zeballos, an old gold mining town built in the 1930s, had seen better days, but the water had lifted many buildings off their foundations, live electric wires lay across the street sending unwary dogs howling off, and people wandering the street with a muted sense of excitement and wondering what was going to happen next. The next morning we returned home to find that the house had been filled to a depth of about two feet of muddy water, some of which remained, floating the linoleum. A couple of holes in the floor with my .308 Winchester hastened its departure - it wasn't much of a house anyway.

On April 27, 2004, the body of young resident Kayla John was found in a wooded area close to her home. The murder made national headlines, shaking this tiny community of under two hundred and fifty people. Less than one month after her death, a local man, George Osmond, was charged with the death of the thirteen-year-old girl. He was convicted and sentenced to life in prison shortly thereafter.

The fact that Kayla John was a member of the Ehattesaht First Nation, and that her alleged killer was a white man, led to suggestion of the crime having racial undertones. It also brought attention to the developing issue of juvenile delinquency in the area, a problem faced by many isolated, predominantly First Nations communities. The public's growing concern resulted in a locally organized policing initiative: Citizens on Patrol.

== Demographics ==
In the 2021 Census of Population conducted by Statistics Canada, Zeballos had a population of 126 living in 71 of its 109 total private dwellings, a change of 17.8% from its 2016 population of 107. With a land area of 1.55 km^{2} (0.60 sq mi), it had a population density of 81.3/km^{2} (210.5/sq mi) in 2021.

== Economy ==
Today, the majority of the town's residents, along with the population of the two neighbouring Native reserves, Oculcje and Ehatis are employed in the timber industry.

Small businesses, specializing in ecotourism, sight-seeing, commercial fishing and oyster farming also contribute to economic growth in the area.

== Miscellaneous ==
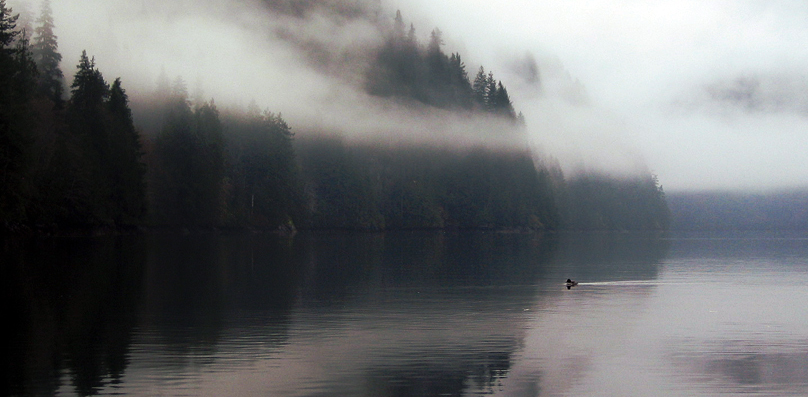
View in Zeballos harbour

- Zeballos offers a multitude of outdoor adventures, such as hiking, wildlife viewing, caving, rock climbing, diving, kayaking and fishing.
- Camping is available in several wilderness locations such as Little Zeballos, Lake Zeballos, and Iron Mine.
- In Autumn, the Zeballos River draws bears and eagles as spawning salmon struggle upstream.
