= Fernando Ceballos =

Spanish footballer (1909–1991)

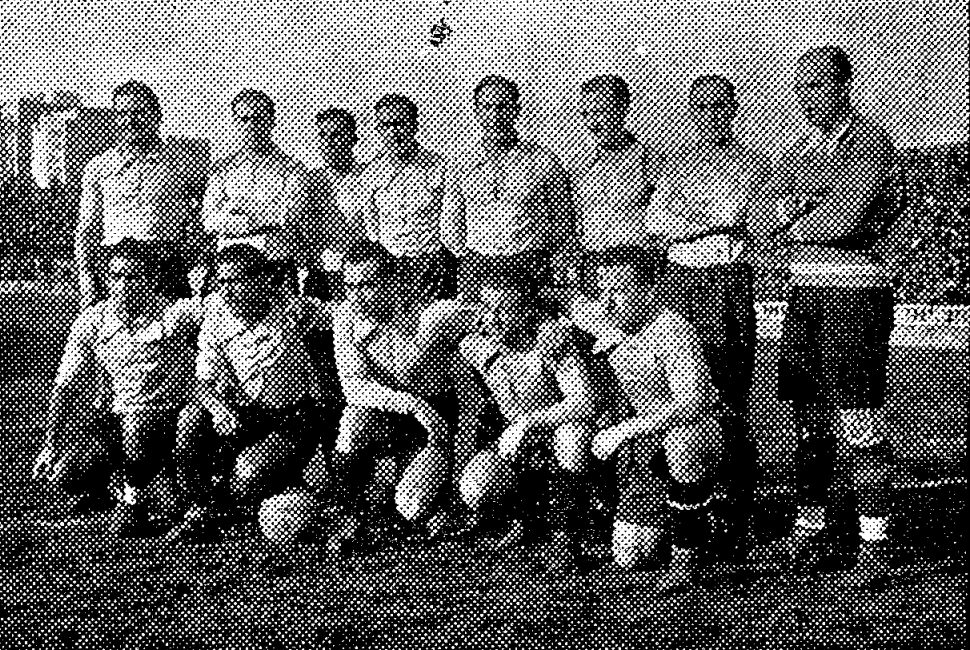
- Ceballos (standing, fourth from left) with the unofficial Spanish team at Les Corts in 1934

Personal information
- Full name: Fernando Ceballos Sáez
- Date of birth: 9 November 1909
- Place of birth: Torrelavega, Cantabria, Spain
- Date of death: 23 September 1991 (aged 81)
- Place of death: Soto de la Marina, Spain
- Position: Defender

Senior career*
Years	Team	Apps	(Gls)
1928–1930	Gimnástica de Torrelavega		
1930–1936	Racing de Santander		
1939–1942	Racing de Santander		
1942–1946	Sporting de Gijón		
1946–1947	Racing de Santander		

International career
1934	Spain (unofficial)	1	(0)
- * Club domestic league appearances and goals

Fernando Ceballos Sáez (9 November 1909 – 23 September 1991) was a Spanish footballer who played as a defender for Racing de Santander in the 1930s and 1940s.

== Playing career ==
=== Club career ===
Born on 9 November 1909 in the Cantabrian town of Torrelavega, Ceballos began his football career in 1928, aged 19, at his hometown club Gimnástica de Torrelavega, with whom he played for two years, until 1930, when he was signed by a top-flight club, Racing de Santander.

Ceballos remained loyal to Racing for over a decade, from 1930 until 1942, helping his side stay in the top-flight until 1940, when the club was relegated to the Segunda División. In total, he scored 3 goals in 129 La Liga matches for Racing. In 1942, he signed for another second division team Sporting de Gijón, with whom he won the 1943–44 Segunda División, thus returning to the top-flight, where he stayed for a further two years, until 1946, when he returned to Racing, where he retired in 1947, aged 38. In total, he scored 3 goals in 152 La Liga matches for Racing and Gijón.

=== International career ===
On 14 February 1934, Ceballos started for Spain in an unofficial match against Catalonia at Les Corts, helping his side to a 2–0 victory.

== Death ==
Ceballos died in Soto de la Marina on 23 September 1991, at the age of 81.

== Honours ==
Sporting de Gijón

- Segunda División:
  - Champions (1): 1943–44
