= Hilda Ceballos =

Mexican politician

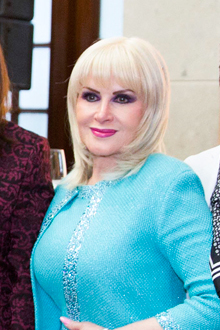
- Born: 22 February 1956 (age 70); Colima, Mexico
- Occupation: Politician
- Political party: PRI

Hilda Ceballos Llerenas (born 22 February 1956) is a Mexican politician from the Institutional Revolutionary Party. From 2009 to 2012 she served as Deputy of the LXI Legislature of the Mexican Congress representing Colima, and previously served in the Congress of Colima.
