= Cevallos =

Cevallos is a Spanish surname and variant spelling of Ceballos. Notable people with the surname include:

- Alejo Peralta y Díaz Cevallos (1916–1997), founder of the Mexico City Tigers baseball club
- Alex Cevallos (born 1967), Ecuadorian football goalkeeper, brother of José Francisco Cevallos
- Diego Fernández de Cevallos (born 1941), Mexican politician
- F. Javier Cevallos (fl. 2014), Ecuadorian-American scholar, president of Framingham State University
- Francisco Fernández de Cevallos (born 1947), Mexican politician
- Francisco José Borja Cevallos (born 1949), Ecuadorian diplomat
- Gabriel Cevallos García (1913–2004), Ecuadorian writer and scholar
- Jorge Cevallos (born 1994), Mexican racing driver
- José Cevallos Cepeda (1831–1893), Mexican politician and military leader
- José Francisco Cevallos (born 1971), Ecuadorian football goalkeeper, brother of Alex Cevallos
- José Cevallos Enríquez (born 1995), Ecuadorian footballer, son of José Francisco Cevallos
- Luis MacGregor Cevallos (1887–1965), Mexican architect and writer
- Pedro Cevallos (1759–1838), Spanish politician
- Pedro Antonio de Cevallos (1715–1778), Spanish soldier, Governor of Buenos Aires
- Pedro José Cevallos (1830–1892), former President of Ecuador
- Rodrigo Borja Cevallos (1935–2025), former President of Ecuador

== See also ==
- Ceballos, surname
