= Rodrigo de Ceballos =

Spanish composer

Rodrigo de Ceballos (also Çavallos, Cevallos, Zaballos; c.1525-c.1581) was a Spanish composer.

== Early life ==
His father's family de Ceballos Cabanilla came from Burgos, and he may have trained as a musician there. However, he was born in Aracena (Huelva), and was ordained a priest in Seville in 1556. He was the brother of the composer Francisco de Ceballos.

== Career ==
He is classed among the composers of the Andalusian school, alongside better-known composers such as Francisco Guerrero (who, with Pedro Fernández de Castilleja, gave him his holy orders) or Cristobal de Morales. He occupied a succession of posts in Andalusia. He was named Maestro de capilla in Málaga in 1554, in the Mosque-Cathedral of Córdoba in 1556, and in the Royal Chapel of Granada in 1561 until his death in 1581.

== Works ==
His polyphonic works, preserved in various Spanish and Latin American cathedrals and monasteries, are often confused with those of Francisco de Ceballos. Francisco, who was maestro at Burgos Cathedral from 1535 to his death in 1571, was Rodrigo's uncle.

79 works of Rodrigo's are known to survive; these include 39 motets, three masses, eight psalms for Vespers, six hymns, eight settings of the Magnificat, a setting of Compline, and seven secular pieces.

== Recordings ==
- Rodrigo de Ceballos – Lamentaciones Ensemble Gilles Binchois, dir Dominique Vellard. Alma Viva DS0136

=== Anthologies ===
The motet Hortus conclusus ("Enclosed garden"), a setting of words from the Song of Songs, has been included in various anthologies, featuring music related to the Song of Songs and music related to gardens, as well as in a disc of music by Esquivel who based a parody mass on it.

- Esquivel: Missa Hortus conclusus, Magnificat & motets. Nicholas Perry (bajón). De Profundis. Eamonn Dougan. 2019.
- Song of Songs. Stile Antico.
- Canticum Canticorum: Spanish polyphonic settings from the Song of Songs Orchestra of the Renaissance dir Richard Cheetham (conductor), Michael Noone.
- El siglo de Oro: Spanish Sacred Music of the Renaissance London Cornett and Sackbut Ensemble, Pro Cantione Antiqua, dir. Bruno Turner.
- Medieval & Renaissance Gardens In Music Orlando Consort
