= Jose Ceballos =

American government official (born 1963)

- Born: 1963 (age 62–63); New York City, U.S.
- Education: Florida State University
- Occupation: S-3 Group
- Spouse: Kelly Ceballos

Jose Luis Ceballos (born 1963) is currently Principal at S-3 Group in Washington, DC. He was formerly the Government Affairs Director for the National Air Traffic Controllers Association (NATCA) until March 2021.

Ceballos graduated from Florida State University in 1991, and ran campaign operations for vice-presidential nominee John Edwards. Prior to the campaign, Ceballos served as director of Policy & Strategic Planning at the National Air Traffic Controllers Association (NATCA), where he focused on grassroots advocacy campaigns. Ceballos has worked for Vice President Al Gore, Transportation Secretary Rodney Slater, and Commerce Secretary Ron Brown.
