= F. Javier Cevallos =

Ecuadorian academic administrator

- Born: Cuenca, Ecuador
- Education: University of Puerto Rico at Mayagüez; University of Illinois at Urbana-Champaign
- Occupation: President of American Academic Leadership Institute

F. Javier Cevallos is an Ecuadorian academic administrator who is the current president of the American Academic Leadership Institute. He was President-in-Residence of the Harvard Graduate School of Education for 2022–23. Cevallos is the former president of Framingham State University in Framingham, Massachusetts, serving from July 1, 2014, until his retirement on August 30, 2022. He previously worked in the same role at Kutztown University from 2002 until being hired at Framingham.

Cevallos was born in Cuenca, Ecuador. He earned his bachelor's degree at the University of Puerto Rico at Mayagüez, and his master's and doctoral degrees from the University of Illinois at Urbana-Champaign. He taught Spanish at University of Maine, then transferred to the University of Massachusetts Amherst where he became a full professor.

Cevallos has two children.

== See also ==
- University of Puerto Rico at Mayaguez people
