= Lucas Ceballos (footballer, born 1988) =

Argentine footballer

Personal information
- Full name: Lucas Hernán Ceballos
- Date of birth: 22 December 1988 (age 37)
- Place of birth: Buenos Aires, Argentina
- Height: 1.74 m (5 ft 8 1/2 in)
- Position: Midfielder

Team information
- Current team: AATEDYC

Senior career*
Years	Team	Apps	(Gls)
2006–2008	Comunicaciones	8	(0)
2009–2010	Boca Río Gallegos	32	(3)
2010–2013	Defensores Unidos	121	(10)
2013–2014	Acassuso	19	(1)
2014–2015	Defensores Unidos		
2020–	AATEDYC	1	(0)
- * Club domestic league appearances and goals

Lucas Hernán Ceballos (born 22 December 1988) is an Argentine footballer who plays as a defender for AATEDYC.

== Career ==
Ceballos started out with Comunicaciones of Primera C, making eight appearances. In 2009, he left to join Torneo Argentino C club Boca Río Gallegos. One goal in sixteen games followed in Torneo Argentino C as Boca won promotion into the 2009–10 Torneo Argentino B. 2010 saw Ceballos sign for Defensores Unidos, he remained there for three seasons and made over one hundred appearances. A short spell with Primera B Metropolitana side Acassuso, with whom he scored on his professional debut with versus Defensores de Belgrano in August 2013, followed prior to a return to Defensores Unidos in 2014.

In 2020, Ceballos joined Torneo Regional Federal Amateur team AATEDYC.
