= Magín Catalá =

Spanish Franciscan missionary

Servant of God Magín Catalá y Guasch OFM
- Born: 29 or 30 January 1761; Montblanc, Tarragona, Spain
- Died: 22 November 1830 (aged 69); Santa Clara, California, United States

Magín Catalá y Guasch, OFM (Catalan: Magí Català i Guasch; 1761 – 1830) was a Spanish Franciscan missionary of in Alta California.

== Biography ==
Magín Catalá was born as Magí Català i Guasch on 29 or 30 January 1761, together with a twin brother, in Montblanc, Tarragona diocese, Spain. He was the son of the spouses Maties (Macià) Català i Roig and Francesca Guasch i Burgueras. At the age of sixteen, the twin brothers entered the Observant Order of the Friars Minor on 4 April 1777, in Barcelona.

Magin Catalá was investitures as a Franciscan at Barcelona on 4 April, 1777. He studied philosophy, theology and morals in Girona and was ordained a priest in 1785. Shortly after, he went to Cádiz, where he sailed in October of 1786 to America with Josep de la Creu Espi, OFM. They arrived in Mexico City in 1786 and joined the Missionary School of San Fernando. It was spent a few years until it was destined to missions on the west coast of the current countries of the United States and Canada, to accompany travelers on the Nootka Bay route, acting as the priest of the Aranzazu frigate.

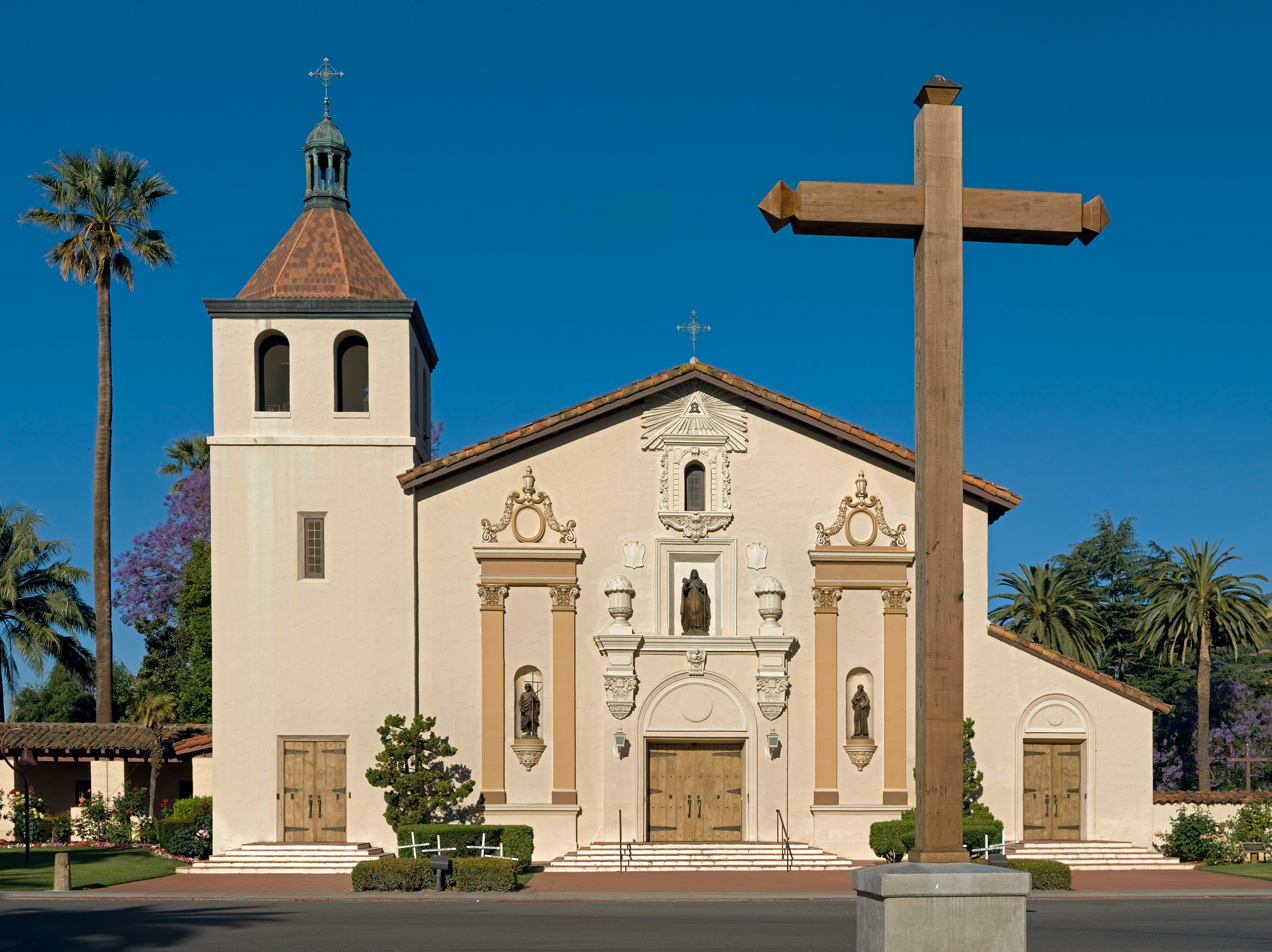
Mission of Santa Clara at present

In 1793, Catalá was sent to Monterrey, and, shortly after that, to the Mission of Santa Clara on the Pacific coast. Seldom came out of Santa Clara and his evangelizing and humanitarian work was extraordinary among the American Indians. He died on 22 November 1830, aged 69, and was buried in the Mission Santa Clara church. He became renowned for his miracles and prophecies. The crucifixus in Mission Santa Clara de Asís is said to have leaned forward to commend Catalá when preaching. The cause of his beatification was introduced in 1884.

== Beatification process ==
In 1884, the Archbishop of San Francisco, José Sadoc Alemany, OP, instructed the canonical process of beatification of Catalá, In 1908-109, the Congregation of the Causes of Saints instituted the beatification process.

His memory is kept at Montblanc, Tarragona in Spain, which has a street dedicated to his name, and the house where he was born is a missionary plate marble memorial.

== Sources ==
- Herbermann, Charles, ed. (1913). "José Viader" . Catholic Encyclopedia. New York: Robert Appleton Company.
- Herbermann, Charles, ed. (1913). "Magin Catalá" . Catholic Encyclopedia. New York: Robert Appleton Company.
