= Kutztown University =

Public university in Kutztown, Pennsylvania, US

Coordinates: 40.511°N 75.783°W

Kutztown University of Pennsylvania
- Former names: Keystone State Normal School (1866–1928); Kutztown State Teacher's College (1928–1960); Kutztown State College (1960–1983)
- Motto: "It's Good to be Golden."
- Type: Public university
- Established: 1866; 160 years ago
- Parent institution: PASSHE
- Academic affiliations: CONAHEC
- Endowment: $45.7 million (2025)
- President: Philip Cavalier
- Faculty: 552
- Administrative staff: 563
- Undergraduates: 7,391
- Postgraduates: 918
- Location: Kutztown, Pennsylvania, United States
- Campus: Rural, 326 acres (132 ha)
- Colors: Maroon and gold
- Nickname: Golden Bears
- Sporting affiliations: NCAA Division II – PSAC
- Website: kutztown.edu

The Kutztown University of Pennsylvania (abbreviated as Kutztown University) is a public university in Kutztown, Pennsylvania, United States. It is part of the Pennsylvania State System of Higher Education (PASSHE) and is accredited by the Middle States Commission on Higher Education.

Founded in 1866, Kutztown University began as the Keystone Normal School based out of the presently-named Old Main Building and specializing in teacher education; in 1928, its name was changed to Kutztown State Teachers College. The school eventually expanded its programs outside education to be christened Kutztown State College in 1960 and finally, Kutztown University of Pennsylvania in 1983.

Between four undergraduate colleges and graduate studies, Kutztown University now offers programs in the liberal arts and sciences, the visual and performing arts, business, education, and certain graduate studies. Eight intercollegiate men's sports and thirteen women's sports compete within the NCAA Division II and the Pennsylvania State Athletic Conference (PSAC).

== History ==
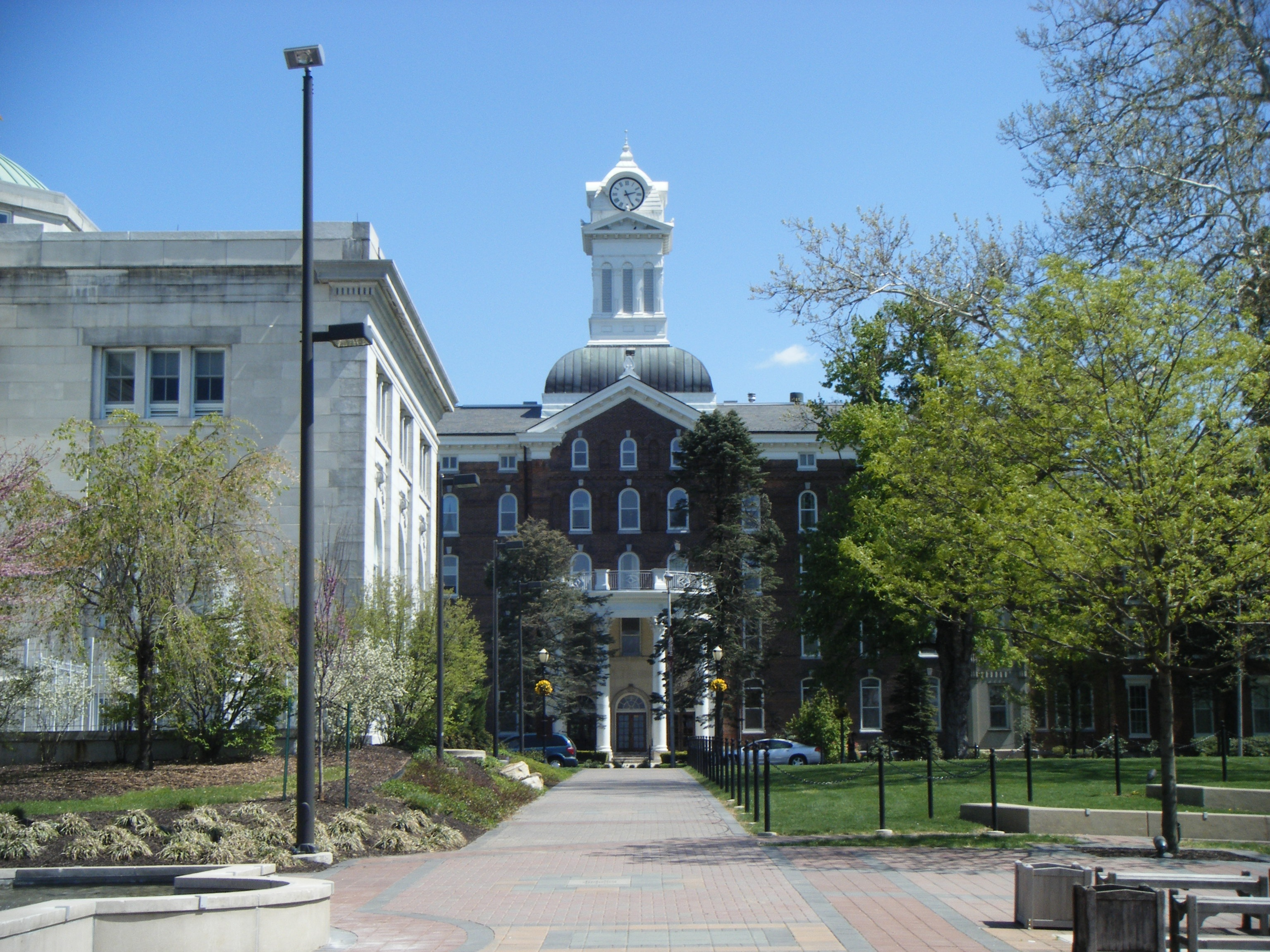
Old Main

On September 15, 1866, the Keystone State Normal School was established on what is now the site of Old Main. The needs of a burgeoning industrialization in the region placed more and more demands on teacher preparation, and in 1928, the institution was designated Kutztown State Teacher's College and authorized to confer the bachelor's degree.

Eventually, the area's need for liberally educated personnel to staff its industries outstripped the need for teachers. In 1960, the Pennsylvania Department of Education changed the institution's name to Kutztown State College and diversified its goals toward "A center for learning for the best possible education of the youth of Pennsylvania in the arts and sciences and preparation of able and dedicated teachers."

On July 1, 1983, the institution became Kutztown University of Pennsylvania of the State System of Higher Education.

As of Fall 2018, the university enrollment was approximately 8,300 full- and part-time undergraduate and graduate students.

== Academics ==
Degrees offered included Bachelor of Arts in 24 subjects, Bachelor of Science in 30, Bachelor of Science in Business Administration in five, Bachelor of Science in Education in five, Bachelor of Social Work, Bachelor of Science in Leisure and Sport Studies, Bachelor of Science in Library Science, and Bachelor of Fine Arts in three subjects. Master's degrees are offered in 18 subjects. The university offers a Doctorate of Social Work. In addition, the university reaches out to the community with credit and non-credit lifelong learning courses.

=== College of Visual and Performing Arts ===
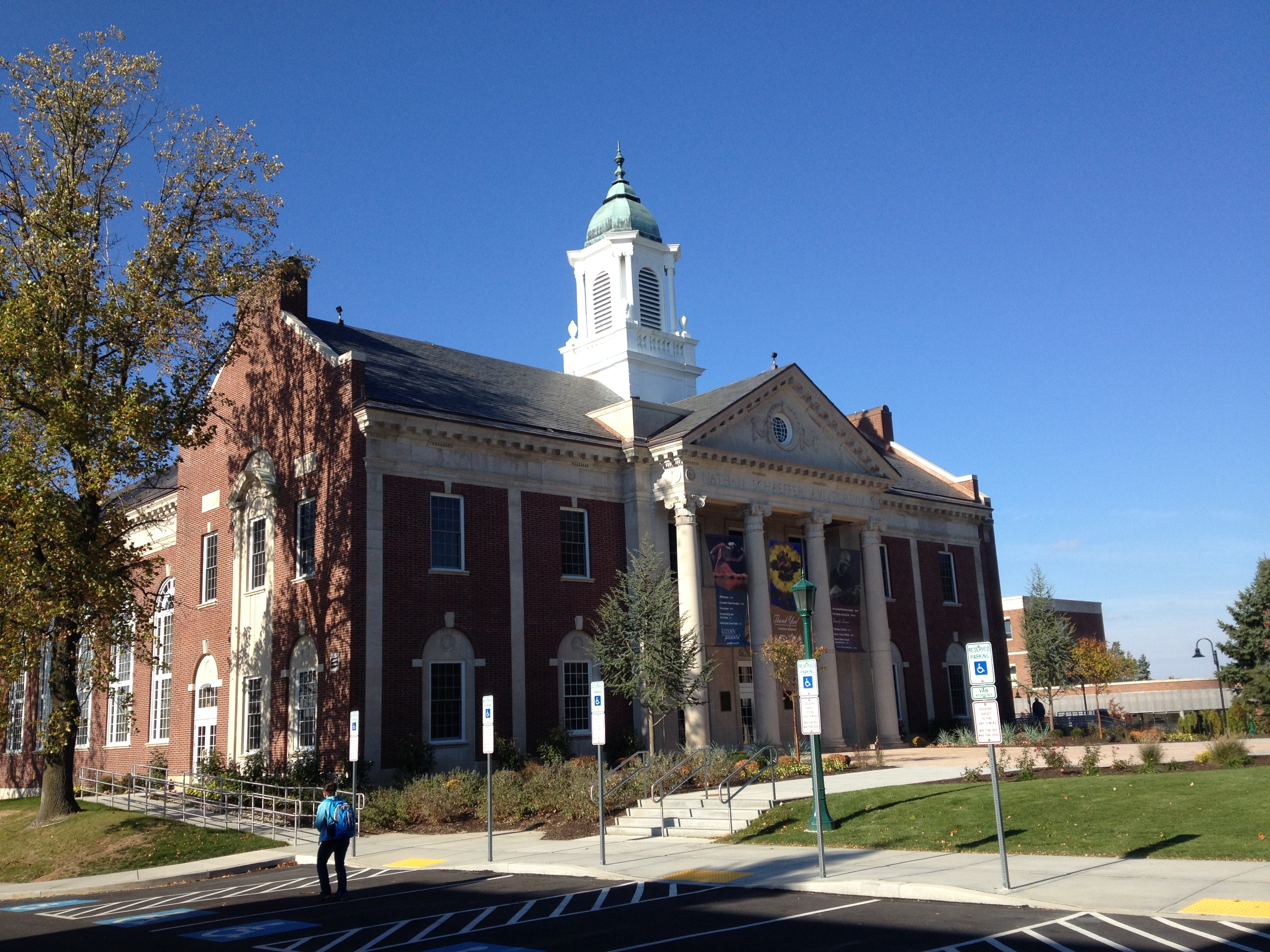
Schaeffer Auditorium

Situated in the Sharadin Arts Building, the College of Visual and Performing Arts offers the Bachelor of Arts and Bachelor of Science degrees. The college also offers master's degrees.

The Marlin and Regina Miller Gallery displays exhibitions of both student and outside artists, often sponsored by Third Pennsylvania Partners in the Arts. In addition, student work is featured weekly within the Student Union Art Gallery in the David E. McFarland Student Union Building.

Music and theatrical performances conducted by Kutztown University Presents make appearances in Schaeffer Auditorium throughout the academic year, and both student and faculty recitals are held by the Department of Music.

=== College of Business ===
Held primarily within the Italo deFrancesco Building, the College of Business provides Bachelor of Science in Business Administration, Bachelor of Science, and Master of Business Administration degrees. The majors offered by the college of business include Accounting, Entrepreneurship, Finance, Finance/Personal Financial Planning, General Business, Human Resource Management, Management, Marketing, and Supply Chain Management. The college is accredited by the Association to Advance Collegiate Schools of Business (AACSB).

The Kutztown University Small Business Development Center helps counsel small business located in surrounding counties, including one-on-one business consulting, professional development seminars on increasing profitability, producing business publications for self-instruction.

=== College of Liberal Arts and Sciences ===
The College of Liberal Arts and Sciences employs an on-campus observatory and 30-acre (12 ha) ecoplot for environmental studies, and independent faculty research projects, geared at providing additional educational and publication opportunities.

=== College of Education ===
Based from the Beekey Education Building, the College of Education offers Bachelor of Science in Education degrees and certifications.

=== Interdisciplinary programs ===
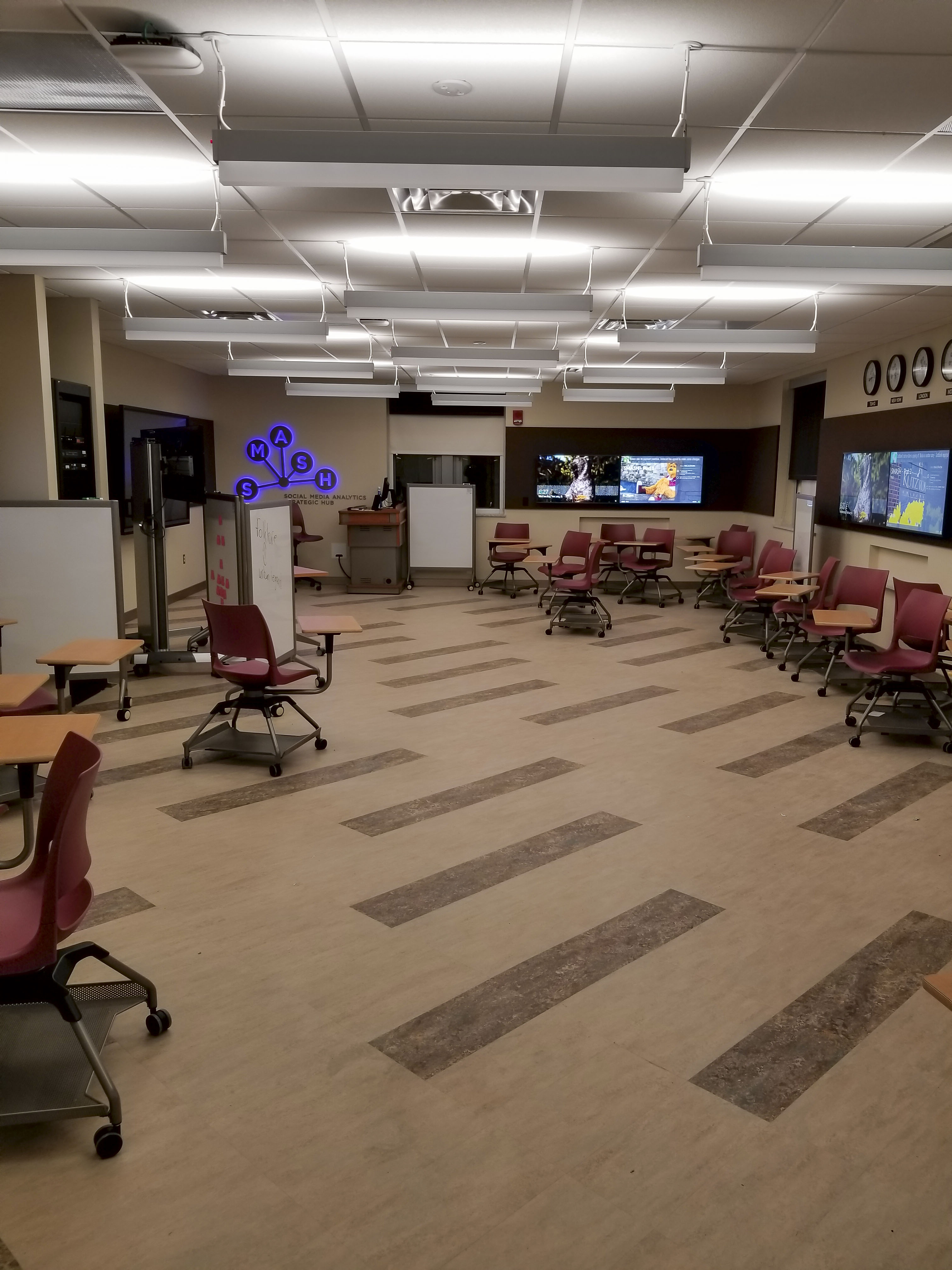
The Social Media Analytics Strategic Hub (SMASH) at Kutztown University supports the Social Media Theory and Strategy (SMS) program.

While officially housed in the College of Visual and Performing Arts, the Bachelor of Science in Social Media Theory and Strategy (SMS), one of the first in the United States, spans three of the four colleges at Kutztown University: College of Visual and Performing Arts, College of Liberal Arts and Sciences, and the College of Business. The Social Media Theory and Strategy degree blends elements of content creation and ethics, digital marketing and business strategy, and data science and analytics. The SMS program is enhanced by the Social Media Analytics Strategic Hub (SMASH), which is a dynamic space for analyzing social media content.

=== Graduate studies ===
Kutztown's counseling programs are accredited by the Council for Accreditation of Counseling and Related Educational Programs (CACREP) in Clinical Mental Health Counseling, Marriage, Couple and Family Counseling, and School Counseling.

==== Library science ====
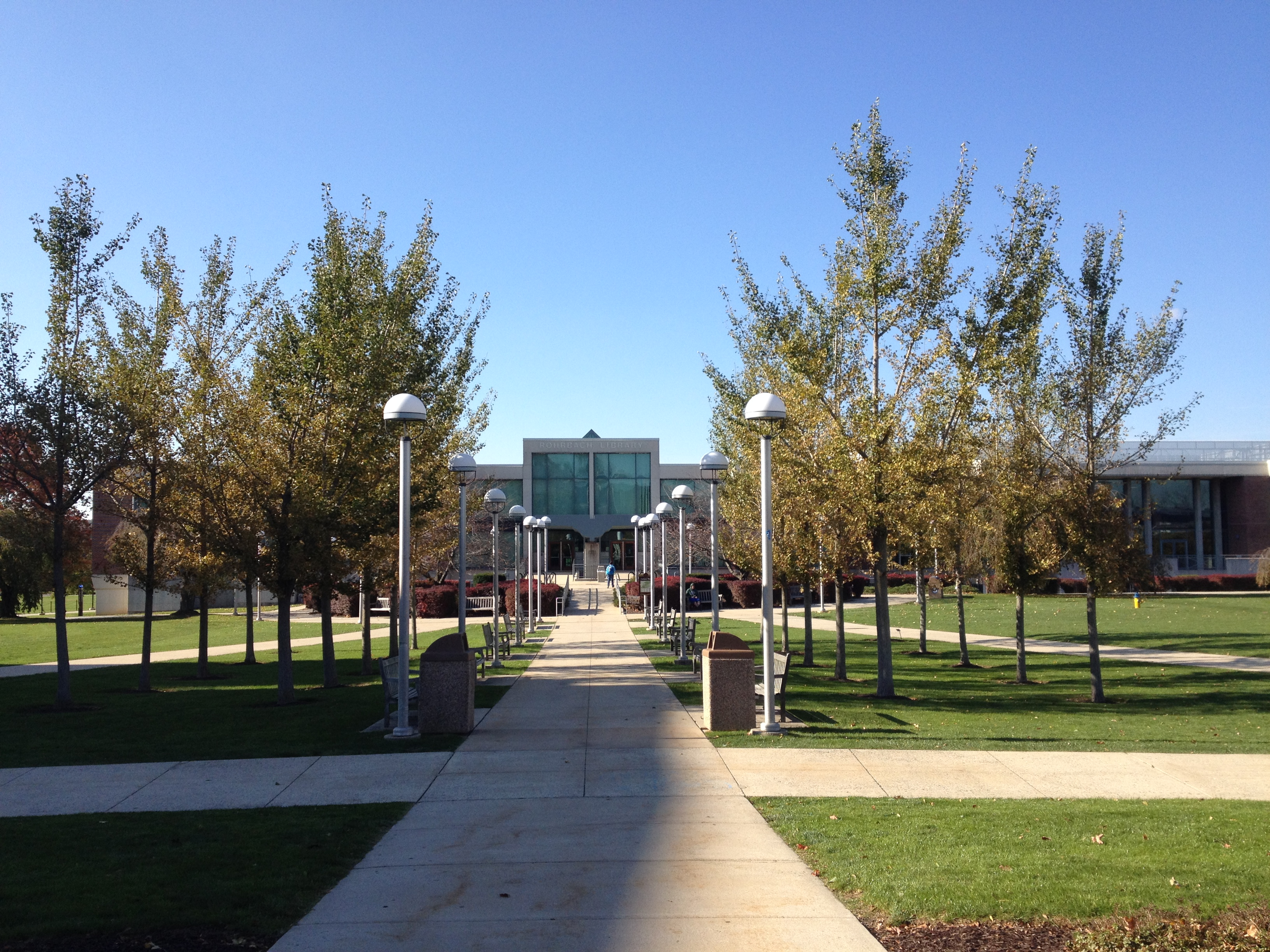
Rohrbach Library

Kutztown has three undergraduate library science programs. There is a special emphasis placed on school librarian programs; a dual major of a Bachelor's in Library Science and Elementary Education certification is a popular program as well as a Bachelor's in Education in library science. Students must complete a 30-hour field observation, professional semester, and clinical experience/student teaching in order to successfully complete the program. The department also provides a Bachelor's in Library Science.

==== Special programs ====
Special programs include Undergraduate Honors Program, Freshmen seminars, Independent study, Internships and ESL Transition Program. There are seventeen international exchange and study abroad programs. The Phi Kappa Phi and [Alpha Epsilon Lambda national honor societies have chapters at the university.

== Campus ==
Kutztown University is a census-designated place in Maxatawny Township just outside the borough of Kutztown and makes up the main population of the university. As of the 2010 census, the population was 2,918 residents.

=== Enrollment ===
Undergraduate demographics as of Fall 2023
Race and ethnicity	Total
White	71%
Hispanic	13%
Black	7%
Two or more races	4%
Asian	2%
International student	1%
Unknown	1%
Economic diversity
Low-income (Note: The percentage of students who received an income-based federal Pell grant intended for low-income students.)	32%
Affluent (Note: The percentage of students who are a part of the American middle class at the bare minimum.)	68%

Enrollment at Kutztown University of Pennsylvania is approximately 8,300 full- and part-time undergraduate and graduate students. Most are Pennsylvania residents, but 28 states and 40 nations are represented in the student body. Division of gender is roughly 55% women, 45% men.

=== Student life ===
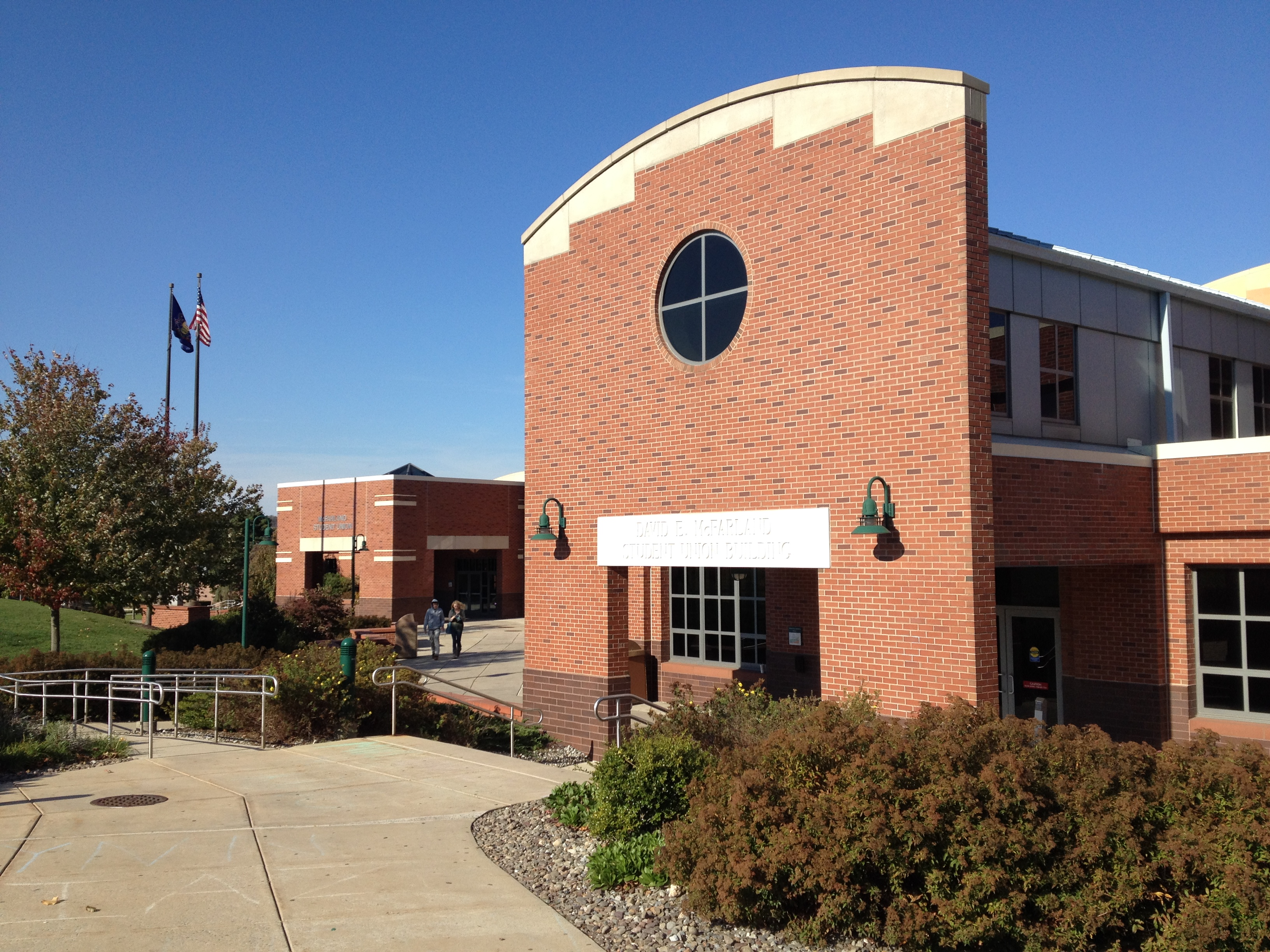
The McFarland Student Union

The approximately 170 student organizations at Kutztown University of Pennsylvania include advisory councils, academic, campus media, diversified interest, Greek Life, performing arts, public service, residency issues, social justice, spiritual, special interest, sports (club and recreation), vegetarianism, and visual arts affiliates; plus musical entertainment, dances, lectures, comedy, excursions, and cultural events. The McFarland Student Union houses the bookstore, movie theater, game room, cafeteria, TV lounge, coffeehouse, financial center, and cyber lounge.

Kutztown University has a free shuttle bus service that serves the campus and the adjacent town when school is in session, consisting of four routes operating at different times and to different locations.

=== International Office ===
Kutztown University has an Office of International Education and Global Engagement (International Office) that supports a robust study abroad program. Over 100 students study abroad each year on KU-Led programs (faculty-led), exchange programs, international internships, and more. The International Office is also responsible for international student admissions, and provides comprehensive support and immigration advising to international students. Kutztown University hosts more than 100 international students from over 40 countries.

=== University facilities ===
Kutztown University of Pennsylvania has many special facilities, including a gallery, planetarium, observatory, LGBTQ Center, TV production facilities, a student-operated radio station, 15 student-accessible computer labs containing nearly 500 systems, cartography lab, early learning center, curriculum materials center, Pennsylvania German Heritage Center, and the Wallops Island marine science consortium facility in Virginia.

The newly constructed Academic Forum within the north campus, opened January 2007, spans 65,000 square feet (6,000 m^{2}) and holds seven smart classrooms for some courses, seating from between 85 and 200 students each, and features a central dining area. Approximately three percent of classes, including 70 of 2,200 sections offered at the university, are taught within the Academic Forum.

Additional renovations to academic buildings and current residence halls attempt to accommodate the rapid expansion of attendance, which has seen an increase of "30 percent from 7,843 in 1996 to a record 10,193 students in the Fall of 2006." The addition to Schaeffer Auditorium is a prime example of one of the many renovation projects.

=== Residence halls ===
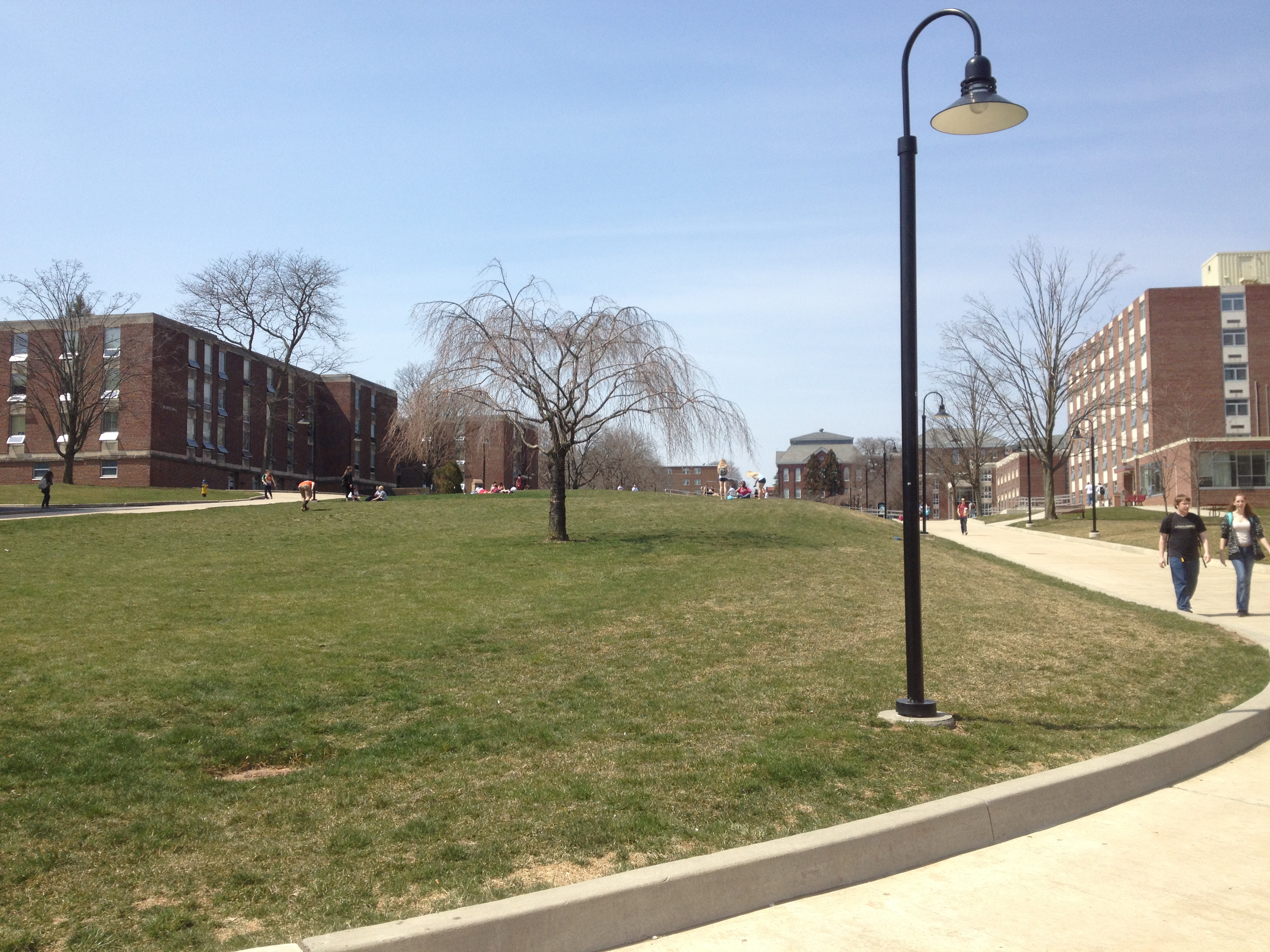
Residence halls on south campus of Kutztown University

Kutztown University of Pennsylvania maintains fourteen residence halls (six coed, one single gender, 2 modified single gender), three apartment-style coed complexes, and one suite-style hall, which accommodate 4,400 students (approximately 49% of full-time undergraduates). All residence halls are wired for cable TV, telephone, and Internet and campus network access.

Cable TV, telephone, and Internet–Network access were introduced via one "drop-down" box in 1998. Telephone and Internet are under the Control of the Information Technology department, and Cable TV is provided by the local Service Electric company.

Due to rising growth in enrollment a new residence hall was completed in fall 2008 to accommodate the growing number of incoming freshmen. The F. Eugene Dixon residence hall, officially the "largest residence hall in the Pennsylvania State System of Higher Education" at approximately 258,000 square feet (24,000 m^{2}), gross, houses 857 beds and 14 efficiency apartments.

== Athletics ==
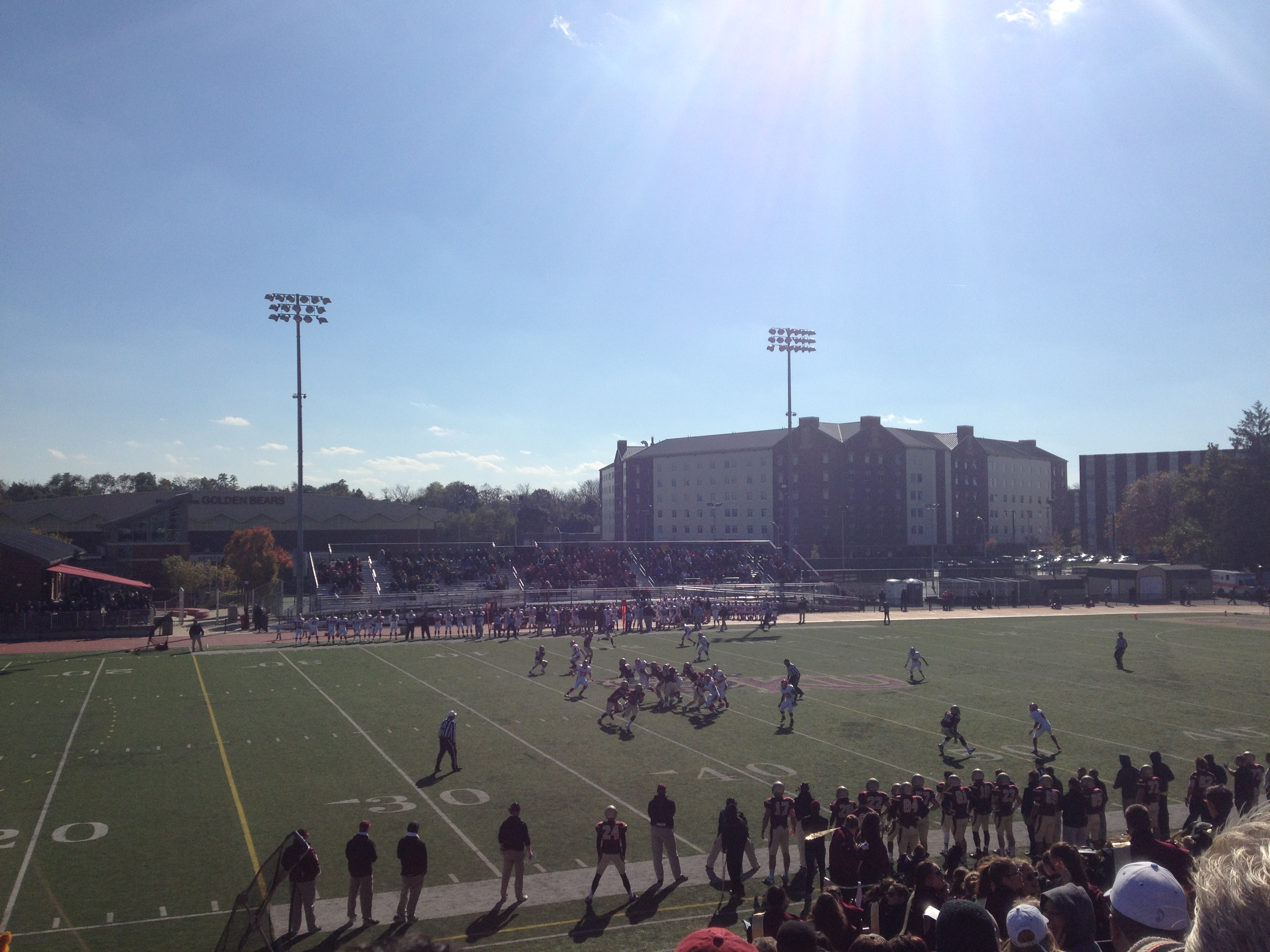
Kutztown Golden Bears football game at Andre Reed Stadium

Kutztown University of Pennsylvania sponsors eight men's and 13 women's intercollegiate sports. Kutztown University is a member of NCAA Division II and competes in the Pennsylvania State Athletic Conference (PSAC).

Kutztown won the Dixon Trophy in 2006, which is awarded to the PSAC school with the best overall athletic program that year. Kutztown had placed second in the PSAC rankings in the 2003–04 and 2004–05 school years. Famous former athletes from Kutztown include National Football League players Andre Reed, a 2014 inductee into the Pro Football Hall of Fame, John Mobley, Bruce Harper, and Doug Dennison and baseball standout Ryan Vogelsong.

In 2007–08, Kutztown University added women's lacrosse and women's bowling to the list of varsity sports that it offers. Also, at the end of the 2008–2009 school year, the university's president announced that Kutztown University would discontinue its men's soccer and men's swimming programs effective immediately.

In January 2020, the university opened its Esports arena, which hosts 14 high-end gaming setups and six 6 Nintendo switches. Since the clubs inception, the club has become the largest sport and student run club in university history hosting a peak of 163 registered members.

The university provides a large array of intramural and club sports programs for the student body. Leagues and tournaments are organized by the Recreational Services department every semester and range from badminton tournaments to rock climbing competitions.

=== Golden Bears ===
From the mid-1930s up until 1961, Kutztown's sports teams were known as the Golden Avalanche. In 1961, Kutztown replaced the Golden Avalanche nickname with the Golden Bears as the university's nickname. In later years, Golden Bear mascots came into play. Before 2005, Goldie and Griz served as the KU Golden Bear mascots. However, they were both "graduated" to make way for a new mascot. The Raymond Entertainment Group of Newark, Delaware, helped KU create the new mascot. On October 1, 2005, at Kutztown's football game versus West Chester University, Kutztown University unveiled Avalanche as the school's new mascot. Avalanche is so named to honor Kutztown State College during the time of the Golden Avalanche sports teams.

The Golden Bears can be seen in more places than the sports fields. Golden Bear statues are located near the basketball courts on South Campus and on North Campus near the Boehm Science Building. Along with the statues, several residential areas are named after the Golden Bear. Golden Bear Village South behind University Place and Golden Bear Village West next to Rothermel Hall are student apartments which hold the Golden Bear moniker.

== Notable faculty and staff ==
- David Cullen, Grammy Award-winning guitarist, former faculty
- Kenneth Hawkinson, former university president
- Irv Mondschein, former assistant track coach
- John Bernard Riley, Grammy Award-winning jazz drummer
- Timothy Seip, former member of Pennsylvania House of Representatives, current faculty
