= Lucas Ceballos (footballer, born 1990) =

Argentine footballer

Personal information
- Full name: Lucas Martín Ceballos Carrizo
- Date of birth: 19 September 1990 (age 36)
- Place of birth: La Rioja, Argentina
- Position: Forward

Team information
- Current team: Estudiantes La Rioja

Youth career
- San Lorenzo

Senior career*
Years	Team	Apps	(Gls)
2011–2012	San Lorenzo	0	(0)
2012–2016	Américo Tesorieri	66	(18)
2013–2014	→ Dock Sud (loan)	22	(1)
2016	Deportivo Armenio	5	(0)
2016–2017	Andino	36	(12)
2017–2019	Américo Tesorieri		
2020	Rioja Juniors	5	(1)
2020–	Estudiantes La Rioja		
- * Club domestic league appearances and goals as of 03:30, 1 October 2020 (UTC)

Lucas Martín Ceballos Carrizo (born 19 September 1990) is an Argentine professional footballer who plays as a forward for Estudiantes La Rioja.

== Career ==
Ceballos started his senior career with Argentine Primera División team San Lorenzo, appearing on the bench once in the Copa Argentina versus Villa Dálmine. In 2012, Ceballos signed for Torneo Argentino B's Américo Tesorieri. He scored eight goals in twenty-four games in his debut season with Américo as they were relegated to Torneo Argentino C, he soon left to join Dock Sud of Primera C Metropolitana on loan. He returned to Américo in 2014 with the club now in the Torneo Federal A; due to the system changes in 2014. He scored in his next appearance, getting Américo's goal in a 5–1 defeat to Unión Villa Krause.

Forty-one games and two campaigns later, Ceballos departed and subsequently signed for Primera B Metropolitana club Deportivo Armenio. His professional debut came on 8 February 2016 in a match against Estudiantes. Four further appearances followed during the 2016 season, prior to him leaving to join Andino of Torneo Federal B on 30 June. Across the next three years, Ceballos had a second stint with Américo Tesorieri, as well as short spell with Rioja Juniors in early 2020. In the succeeding August, Ceballos joined Estudiantes La Rioja of Liga Riojana; a club managed by his father, Isidro.

== Personal life ==
Ceballos's father, Isidro, was also a professional footballer; notably in the Primera División for Instituto.

== Career statistics ==
As of 1 October 2020.

Club statistics
Club	Season	League			Cup (Note: Includes the Copa Argentina)		League Cup		Continental		Other		Total	
Club	Season	Division	Apps	Goals	Apps	Goals	Apps	Goals	Apps	Goals	Apps	Goals	Apps	Goals
San Lorenzo	2011–12	Primera División	0	0	0	0	—		—		0	0	0	0
Américo Tesorieri	2012–13	Torneo Argentino B	24	8	1	0	—		—		0	0	25	8
Américo Tesorieri	2013	Torneo Argentino C	0	0	0	0	—		—		0	0	0	0
Américo Tesorieri	2014	Torneo Federal A	13	3	1	1	—		—		0	0	14	4
Américo Tesorieri	2015	Torneo Federal A	29	7	0	0	—		—		0	0	29	7
Américo Tesorieri	Total		66	18	2	1	—		—		0	0	68	19
Dock Sud (loan)	2012–13	Primera C Metropolitana	22	1	1	0	—		—		0	0	23	1
Deportivo Armenio	2016	Primera B Metropolitana	5	0	0	0	—		—		0	0	5	0
Andino	2016–17	Torneo Federal B	18	6	0	0	—		—		0	0	18	6
Andino	2017–18	Torneo Federal B	14	3	0	0	—		—		0	0	14	3
Andino	Total		32	9	0	0	—		—		0	0	32	9
Américo Tesorieri	2019	Torneo Amateur	10	2	0	0	—		—		0	0	10	2
Rioja Juniors	2020	Torneo Amateur	5	1	0	0	—		—		0	0	5	1
Career total			138	31	3	1	—		—		0	0	141	32
