= Esperanza Inlet =

Inlet in Canada

Coordinates: 49°51′30″N 126°54′00″W

Esperanza Inlet is an inlet on the West Coast of Vancouver Island in British Columbia, Canada. Its entrance is located off the northwest side of Nootka Island and is defined by a line drawn from Tachu Point to Blind Reef. Until that definition was applied by the Canadian Hydrographic Service in 1959, the inlet's entrance was considered to be the area southeast of Catala Island. Among its adjoining branches is Zeballos Inlet.

== Name origin ==
Originally charted as "Hope Bay" by Captain James Cook, defining its opening as being between "Breakers Point" (Estevan Point) and Woody Point (Cape Cook). This name was adapted into Spanish by Alessandro Malaspina whose officers, José Espinosa y Tello and Ciriaco Ceballos (the namesake of Zeballos Inlet), explored this inlet in 1791.
