= Ciriaco Ceballos =

Spanish explorer

Ciriaco Ceballos Neto or Ciriaco Cevallos y Bustillo (8 August 1764, Quijano – 9 February 1816, New Orleans) was a Spanish sailor, explorer and cartographer. The Zeballos River and Zeballos, British Columbia are named after him.
