= Moca =

Moca, MoCA, or MOCA may refer to:

== Places ==
- Moca, Dominican Republic
- Moca, Equatorial Guinea
- Moca, Puerto Rico
- Moča, Slovakia
- Mouca (also spelled "Moca"), a river in Romania

== People ==
- Moca (born 2001), member of the Japanese co-ed group lol
- Momčilo Vukotić (1950–2021), Serbian football coach nicknamed "Moca"
- Moca Aoba, a character in the multimedia franchise BanG Dream!

== Organizations ==
- Ministry of Civil Aviation (India)
- Minnesota Ovarian Cancer Alliance
- Mosaic Outdoor Clubs of America
- Another Way Movement (Spanish: Movimiento Otro Camino, MOCA), a Panamanian political party

== Science and technology ==
- Moca (genus), a genus of moths
- MOCA (protein), involved in cell signaling
- Moca, a nickname for Andira inermis, a tree
- Minimum obstacle clearance altitude, in aviation
- Multimedia over Coax Alliance (MoCA), a networking industry group
- 4,4'-Methylenebis(2-chloroaniline), a compound used in polyurethane production
- Molybdenum cofactor cytidylyltransferase, an enzyme

== Museums ==
- Museum of Contemporary Art (disambiguation), any of several museums
- Museum of Comic Art, in Noordwijk, The Netherlands
- Museum of Conceptual Art, a former museum in San Francisco
- Museum of Chinese in America, in New York City
- Museum of Chinese in Australia, in Sydney

== Other uses ==
- Montreal Cognitive Assessment (MoCA), a test of cognitive function in humans
- Matrix of Comparative Anthropogeny, formerly Museum of Comparative Anthropogeny, an online resource comparing great apes and humans
- Trumpchi Moca, a concept car by GAC Trumpchi

== See also ==
- MOCCA (disambiguation)
- Mocha (disambiguation)
- Moka (disambiguation)
