= Cevallos, Ecuador =

Cevallos,Ecuador
- Town
- Location within Ecuador
- Coordinates: 01°21′0″S 78°37′0″W
- Country: Ecuador
- Province: Tungurahua Province
- Canton: Cevallos Canton

Government
  - Mayor: Bayardo Constante Espinoza

Area
  - Town: 2.06 km^{2} (0.80 sq mi)

Population (2022 census)
  - Town: 3,754
  - Density: 1,820/km^{2} (4,720/sq mi)
- Time zone: ECT
- Climate: Cfb

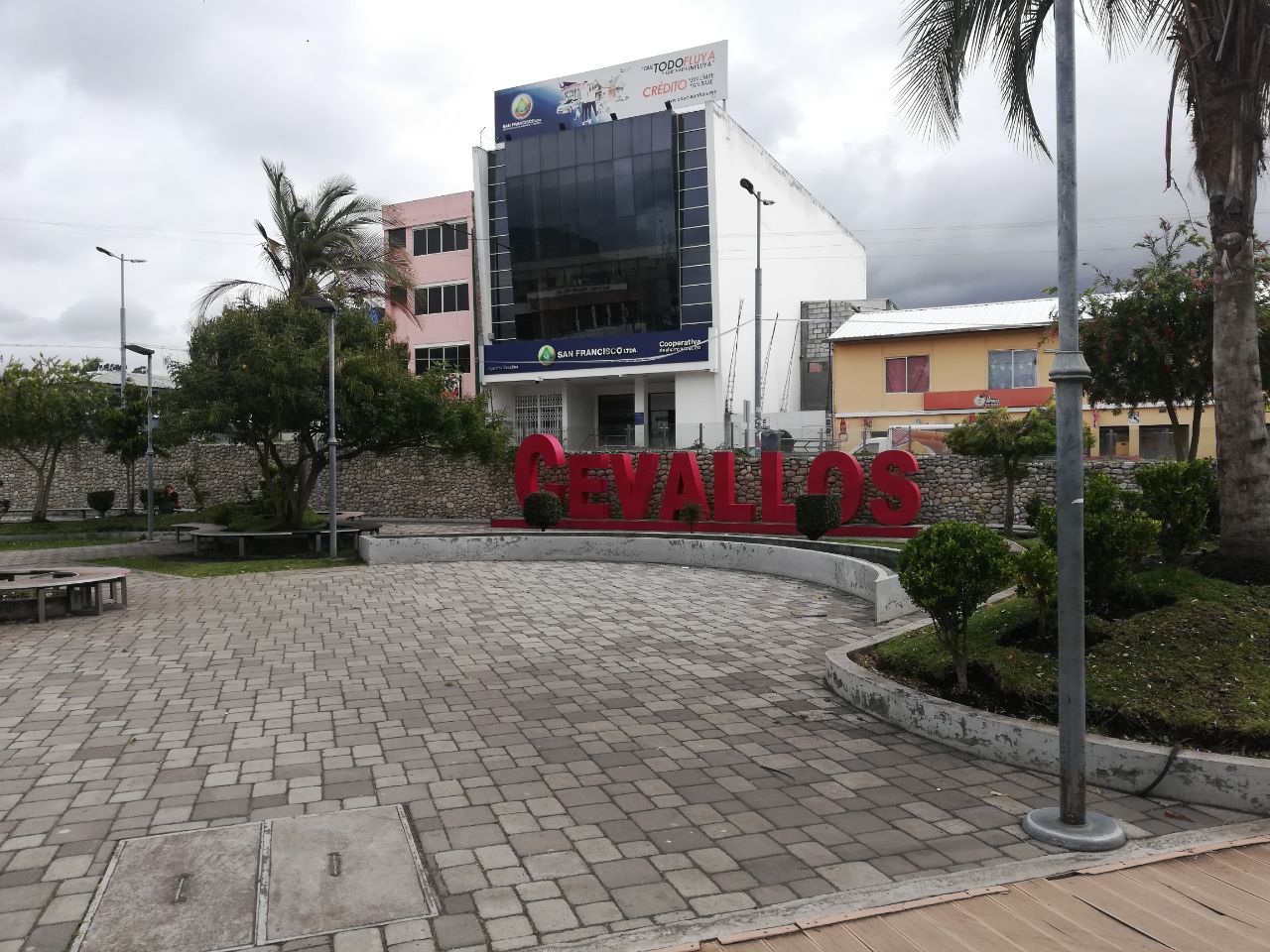

Cevallos is a town in the Tungurahua Province, Ecuador. It is the seat of the Cevallos Canton.
