= Diana Ruiz =

Ecuadorian aviator (1992–2024)

Captain Diana Ruiz
- Born: Diana Estefanía Ruiz Solís; 7 April 1992; Píllaro Canton, Ecuador
- Died: 26 November 2024 (aged 32); La Libertad, Ecuador
- Cause of death: Airplane crash
- Other name: "la Chinita"
- Employer(s): Escuela Superior Militar de Aviación, Ecuadorian Armed Forces
- Known for: First Ecuadorian woman to fly at supersonic speed

Diana Estefanía Ruiz Solís (7 April 1992 – 26 November 2024) was an Ecuadorian military pilot. Known as 'La Mujer Supersónica', she was notable for becoming the first Ecuadorian woman to fly at supersonic speed and for breaking barriers for women in aviation in Ecuador.

== Biography ==
Diana Ruiz was born in Píllaro Canton, in Ecuador's Tungurahua Province on 7 April 1992. In 2009, she enrolled at the Cosme Renella Barbato Military Aviation School where she began training as a pilot. Ruiz was part of the first female graduating class at the Aviation School, and also was part of the third class of female weapon officers and technicians.

Ruiz made her first solo flight on 10 February 2010. On 13 March 2014 at age 22, Ruiz became the first Ecuadorian woman to fly a military aircraft at supersonic speed, when she piloted an Atlas Cheetah at Ecuador's Taura military base.

Ruiz died when the plane she was piloting crashed and hit a car and a motorcycle in Ecuador's Santa Elena Province on 26 November 2024. She was 32. Ecuadorian cadet Juan Andrés Pacheco Ramírez was also killed in the crash alongside her. At the time, Ruiz and Pacheco were conducting a training flight in a Diamond DA20 Katana. The plane descended with the engine off, and crashed while undertaking a forced landing on a central street in a neighborhood in La Libertad Canton. Two residents on the ground were injured in the accident.
