= Mocha =

Mocha may refer to:

== Places ==
- Mokha, a port city in Yemen
- Mocha Island, an island in Biobío Region, Chile
- Mocha, Chile, a town in Chile
- Mocha, Ecuador, a city in Ecuador
- Mocha Canton, a government subdivision in Ecuador
- Mocha, a segment of Kutiyana (Vidhan Sabha constituency), Gujarat, India
- Mocha, Madhya Pradesh, a village in Mandla, Madhya Pradesh, India

== People ==
- Mocha Diva, stage name of Filipino drag queen Jay Venn
- Mocha Uson or Mocha (born c. 1978) stage name of Philippine performer and blogger Esther Margaux Justiniano Uson
- Nickname of Maurie Dunstan (1929–1991), Australian rules footballer
- Nickname of Aída García Naranjo (born 1951), Peruvian educator, singer, and politician

== Software ==
- Mocha (decompiler), for the Java language
- Mocha (JavaScript framework), for writing unit tests
- Mocha, the working title of the programming language that was later named JavaScript
- Mocha-brand image-processing software products from Imagineer Systems

== Other uses ==
- Caffè mocha, a coffee beverage which incorporates chocolate, and usually also milk
- Mocha, a coffee-and-chocolate flavor of ice cream
- Mocha coffee bean, a cultivated variety
- Wey Mocha, a mid-size luxury crossover SUV
- A moth of the genus Cyclophora
- A moth of the European species Cyclophora annularia
- Mocha or Shekkacho language, a language of Ethiopia
- Cyclone Mocha

== See also ==
- MOCA (disambiguation)
- MOCCA (disambiguation)
- Moka (disambiguation)
- Rapid Climate Change-Meridional Overturning Circulation and Heatflux Array (RAPID/MOCHA), a research project
