= Oscar Efren Reyes =

Oscar Efrén Reyes (June 13, 1896, Baños – December 6, 1966, Quito), was a historian, journalist, politician, researcher and an Ecuadorian teacher. He is remembered for his teachings as well as his historic research of Ecuador and America.

== Early life and education ==
Reyes was born in Baños, Tungurahua Province on June 13, 1896, the only child of María Petronila Reyes Noboa. His father was an arriero (muleteer). His grandparents, Francisco Reyes Hidalgo and Regina Noboa, owned a farm called La Escudilla. I After the death of his mother in 1909 due to cancer, he was placed in the care of his aunt and uncle, Rosita Romo de Reyes and Juan Reyes Noboa.

Eventually he received education in grammar and mathematics, paid for by Dominican parish priest Fray Juan Halflants, who had admired the literary knowledge of Reyes at the age of 15. After two years of instruction and study, and under the watch of Halflants, the young 16 year old Reyes started his work as a teacher of children in the city of Baños, who still remember him for his introversion and kindness.

In 1914, with a scholarship from the State, Reyes enrolled at the Juan Montalvo Normal. He graduated in 1916 with the highest honors.

== Death ==
Reyes died in the city of Quito in the early morning of December 1, 1966, at a Military Hospital. His remains were moved to Baños, his birthplace, on June 13, 1985.
