= Moka (disambiguation) =

Moka is a village in Mauritius.

Moka may also refer to:

== People ==
- Moka Slavnic (born 1949), a Serbian basketball player and coach
- Moka Blast (born 1979), American rapper, singer, songwriter, videographer, and entrepreneur
- Moka Only, Canadian rapper, singer, and record producer
- Moka Hotei (布袋 百椛; born 2004), Japanese member of the AKB48
- Moka Kamishiraishi (上白石 萌歌; born 2000), Japanese actress and singer
- Moka Kuwagata (桑形 萌花; born 2002), Japanese judoka
- Moka Miyamoto (宮本 もか; born 1999), Japanese retired professional wrestler and former karateka
- Moka Sakai (境 萌花; born 2004), Japanese singer and member of South Korean girl group ILLIT
- Moka Te Kainga-mataa (1790s–1860s), Māori rangatira (chief) of the Ngā Puhi iwi from Northland in New Zealand
- Alain Moka (born 1953), Congolese politician
- Gari Moka (born 1983), Papua New Guinea footballer
- Makida Moka (born 1992), Egyptian-born Nigerian actress and model
- Waldemir Moka (born 1951), Brazilian politician and doctor

== Places ==
- Moka Assembly constituency, one of the 60 Legislative Assembly constituencies
- Moka District, the district in Mauritius where the village of Moka is located
- Moka, Equatorial Guinea, a town on the island of Bioko in Equatorial Guinea
- Moka, Hiiu County, a village in Hiiu County, Estonia
- Moka Range, a mountain range north of the village of Moka in Mauritius
- Moka, Rapla County, a village in Rapla County, Estonia
- Mōka Station, a railway station in Mooka, Tochigi Prefecture, Japan
- Mooka, Tochigi (also spelled "Moka" or "Mōka"), a city in Japan

== Other uses ==
- Moka Akashiya, a character from the anime/manga Rosario + Vampire
- Moka exchange, a gifting ritual that establishes social status among the Kawelka of Papua New Guinea
- Moka pot, a type of coffee pot
- Moka (film), a 2016 Franco-Swiss film
- Moka (album), a 2009 album by Kaori Mochida

== See also ==
- Mokas, a village in Masovian Voivodeship, Poland
- Mocha (disambiguation)
- Moca (disambiguation)
- MOCCA (disambiguation)
