= Carlos Lara Bejarano =

Ecuadorian radiotelegraphist and bureaucrat

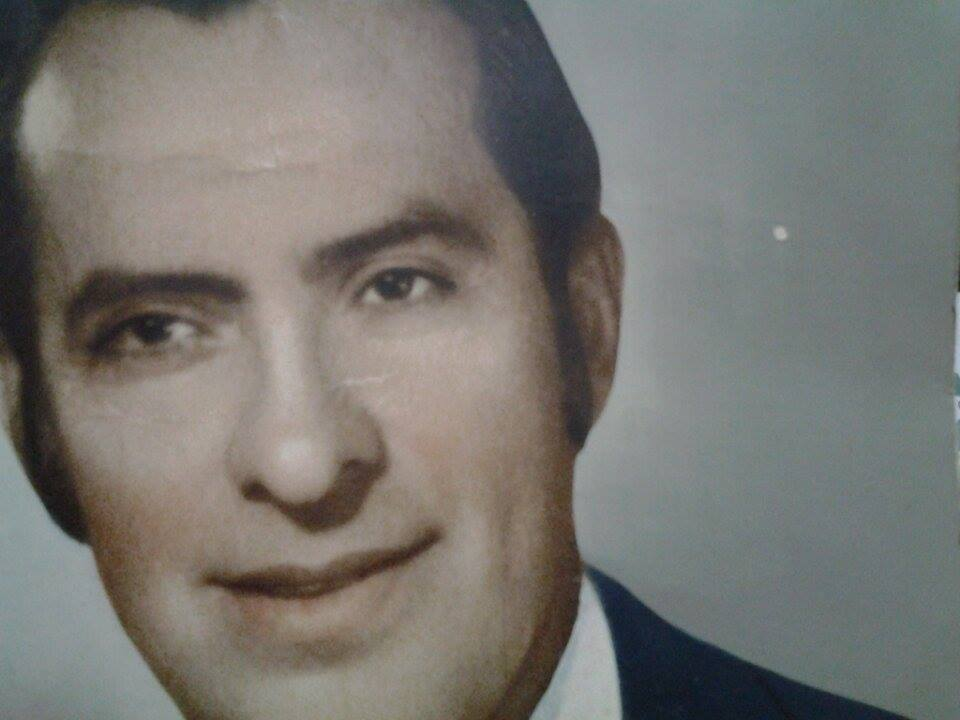
- Born: April 19, 1923; Pelileo, Ecuador
- Died: July 13, 2006 (aged 83); Portoviejo, Ecuador
- Occupation: Radiotelegraphist
- Spouse: Mercedes Murillo (m. 1942)
- Children: Jané Eleonor, Mercedes Virginia, Mercedes Eleodora, María del Carmen, Carlos Julio, Olga Beatriz, Víctor Hugo, Olinda Amabilia, Antonio Augusto, Remigio Patricio, Fernando Javier, Tamara Irina, Juan Carlos, Marco Antonio, César David, Yadira Lorena and Patricio Javier.
- Parent(s): Moisés Lara; Virginia Bejarano

Carlos Moisés Lara Bejarano (April 19, 1924, in Pelileo – July 13, 2006, in Portoviejo) was an Ecuadorian radiotelegraphist and bureaucrat.

== Bio ==
Born in Pelileo, he emigrated at an early age to Ibarra with his father, as his mother had died when he was young. He studied in Ibarra until high school, and at the age of 17, he moved to Portoviejo, where he started working at the Ecuadorian National Telegraph Office. In the capital of Manabí, he met his future wife, Mercedes Murillo Loor, a native of Jipijapa. They married on June 6, 1942, and had 12 children.

== Radiotelegraphist career ==
In 1958, the Ecuadorian Telephone and Telegraph Company was established through the merger of the Telegraph Direction and the International Radio of Ecuador. This move was made by the government to prevent potential monopoly concerns. In 1960, President Camilo Ponce Enríquez appointed him as the National Director of both companies. He held this position until 1963 when he was removed from office by the dictatorship of the Military Junta.

== Other offices ==
After working as a radiotelegraphist, he transitioned to the telecommunications sector of the National Development Bank, leveraging his extensive experience in the field. Additionally, he held positions at the Ecuadorian Institute of Social Security and the General Comptroller of the State, where he retired in 1992.

== Death ==
He died in Portoviejo of cancer on July 13, 2006.
