= Llanganates National Park =

National park in Ecuador

- IUCN category II (national park)
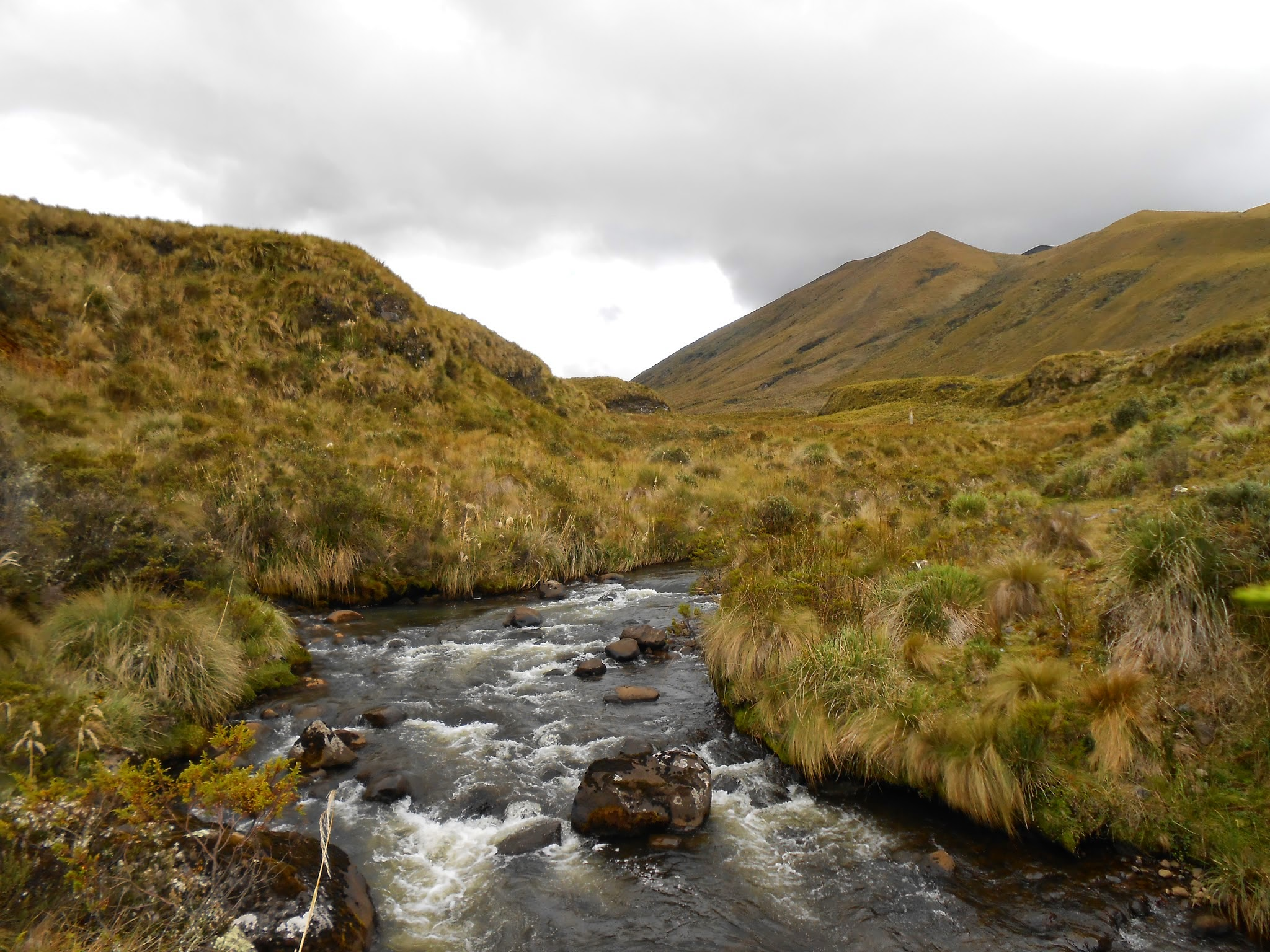
- High elevation páramo at Llanganates NP

- Location within Ecuador
- Location: Ecuador; Cotopaxi Province, Napo Province, Pastaza Province and Tungurahua Province.
- Coordinates: 1°8′0″S 78°14′0″W
- Area: 219,707 ha (542,910 acres)
- Established: January 18, 1996

Llanganates National Park (Spanish: Parque Nacional Llanganates) is a protected area in Ecuador situated in the Cotopaxi Province, Napo Province, Pastaza Province and Tungurahua Province. Located within the park is Cerro Hermoso ("beautiful mountain"), a 4,570 meters (14,990 ft) high peak that is a popular hiking destination. The park is famous for the Treasure of the Llanganatis.

The park can be accessed from a number of directions, but visitors usually come through towns such as Salcedo, Patate, Pillaro, Baños, and Rio Verde.

== Ecology ==
The park is divided into two ecological zones, the western zone and the eastern zone. The western zone is located in the Andean páramo, high above the eastern zone, containing a deserted landscape of mountainous peaks and high valleys. The area is populated mainly by South American camelids like vicuñas, llamas and alpacas.

The eastern zone is located on the eastern flanks of the Andes, with montane forests characterized by a rich diversity of plants and animals among the twisted forests of the upper Amazon. This area is highly unreachable, and is usually traversed only by foot. The large number of rivers, emptying out the Andes also makes this area difficult to cross. In recent years, several new species of plants have been discovered here, including several species of rare Andean Magnolia.

== Exploration ==
In 2013, explorers from Ecuador, France, the United Kingdom, and the United States discovered and unearthed a 260 ft tall by 260 ft wide structure, made up of hundreds of two-ton stone blocks, and believe there could be more, similar constructions over an area of about a square mile. The area is 20 miles from the town of Baños but the trek takes around eight hours through swampy and mountainous jungle. The area of discovery is at an altitude of 8,500 ft above sea level and in cloud forest.
