= Moca chrysocosma =

Scientific classification
- Domain: Eukaryota
- Kingdom: Animalia
- Phylum: Arthropoda
- Class: Insecta
- Order: Lepidoptera
- Family: Immidae
- Genus: Moca
- Species: M. chrysocosma

Binomial name
- Moca chrysocosma (Diakonoff, 1967)

Synonyms
- Imma chrysocosma Diakonoff, 1967

Species of moth

Moca chrysocosma is a moth in the family Immidae. It was described by Alexey Diakonoff in 1967. It is found on Luzon in the Philippines.

The wingspan is about 20 mm. The forewings are dark fuscous with a blue-lilac gloss in certain lights, the markings bright yellow, well defined. There is a clavate patch along less than the anterior half of the costa, extending over the upper half of the base of the wing, posteriorly dilated into a rounded-triangular tooth almost to the middle of the wing, the lower edge of the patch concave, the posterior edge convex. A slightly oblique erect semi-oval moderate patch is found on two-thirds of the costa and there are faint markings of lilac-blue iridescence. A short transverse streak is found along the closing vein and a marginal line along the posterior fourth of the costa, in the apex and along the termen. The hindwings are dark fuscous, the dorsum with a narrow pale yellow streak.
