= Moca fungosa =

Scientific classification
- Domain: Eukaryota
- Kingdom: Animalia
- Phylum: Arthropoda
- Class: Insecta
- Order: Lepidoptera
- Family: Immidae
- Genus: Moca
- Species: M. fungosa

Binomial name
- Moca fungosa (Meyrick, 1914)

Synonyms
- Imma fungosa Meyrick, 1914

Species of moth

Moca fungosa is a moth in the family Immidae. It was described by Edward Meyrick in 1914. It is found in Taiwan.
