= Moca pelomacta =

Scientific classification
- Domain: Eukaryota
- Kingdom: Animalia
- Phylum: Arthropoda
- Class: Insecta
- Order: Lepidoptera
- Family: Immidae
- Genus: Moca
- Species: M. pelomacta

Binomial name
- Moca pelomacta (Meyrick, 1922)

Synonyms
- Imma pelomacta Meyrick, 1922

Species of moth

Moca pelomacta is a moth in the family Immidae. It was described by Edward Meyrick in 1922. It is found in Brazil.

The wingspan is about 12 mm. The forewings are pale brownish ochreous sprinkled with dark fuscous and with suffused irregular dark fuscous spots on the costa near the base and at one-fourth and the middle, and on the base of the dorsum. There are less defined smaller spots in the disc at one-fourth and the middle and there is a transverse dark fuscous mark on the end of the cell, and a blotch beneath the middle of the disc confluent with its lower extremity. There are also two very irregular interrupted posterior dark fuscous shades and a dark fuscous marginal line around the apex and termen. The hindwings are dark fuscous.
