= Moca chelacma =

Scientific classification
- Kingdom: Animalia
- Phylum: Arthropoda
- Class: Insecta
- Order: Lepidoptera
- Family: Immidae
- Genus: Moca
- Species: M. chelacma

Binomial name
- Moca chelacma (Meyrick, 1927)

Synonyms
- Imma chelacma Meyrick, 1927

Species of moth

Moca chelacma is a moth in the family Immidae. It was described by Edward Meyrick in 1927. It is found on Samoa. Its type locality is Malololelei on the island of Upolu.
