= Moca mniograpta =

Scientific classification
- Kingdom: Animalia
- Phylum: Arthropoda
- Class: Insecta
- Order: Lepidoptera
- Family: Immidae
- Genus: Moca
- Species: M. mniograpta

Binomial name
- Moca mniograpta (Meyrick, 1931)

Synonyms
- Imma mniograpta Meyrick, 1931

Species of moth

Moca mniograpta is a moth in the family Immidae. It was described by Edward Meyrick in 1931. It is found in Peru.
