= Moca vexatalis =

Scientific classification
- Kingdom: Animalia
- Phylum: Arthropoda
- Class: Insecta
- Order: Lepidoptera
- Family: Immidae
- Genus: Moca
- Species: M. vexatalis

Binomial name
- Moca vexatalis (Walker, [1866])

Synonyms
- Alicarda vexatalis Walker, [1866]

Species of moth

Moca vexatalis is a moth in the family Immidae. It was described by Francis Walker in 1866. It is found in Brazil.

Adults are reddish, the body silvery white beneath and the palpi white beneath. The abdomen and hindwings are brown and the forewings are minutely cinereous speckled, with some darker red and brownish patches. The marginal points are brownish.
