= Moca purpurascens =

Scientific classification
- Kingdom: Animalia
- Phylum: Arthropoda
- Class: Insecta
- Order: Lepidoptera
- Family: Immidae
- Genus: Moca
- Species: M. purpurascens

Binomial name
- Moca purpurascens (Hampson, [1893])

Synonyms
- Callartona purpurascens Hampson, [1893]

Species of moth

Moca purpurascens is a moth in the family Immidae. It was described by George Hampson in 1893. It is found in India.

The wingspan is about 22 mm. Adults are black, with a brilliant purple shot, the forewings with two large yellow triangular spots on the costa. The hindwings have a yellow streak below the cell, curving up to the costa beyond it.
