= Moca antiquata =

Scientific classification
- Domain: Eukaryota
- Kingdom: Animalia
- Phylum: Arthropoda
- Class: Insecta
- Order: Lepidoptera
- Family: Immidae
- Genus: Moca
- Species: M. antiquata

Binomial name
- Moca antiquata (Meyrick, 1913)

Synonyms
- Imma antiquata Meyrick, 1913

Species of moth

Moca antiquata is a moth in the family Immidae. It was described by Edward Meyrick in 1913. It is found in Guyana.

The wingspan is 11–12 mm. The forewings are dark fuscous, irregularly sprinkled with violet whitish, especially on the undefined transverse bands at one-third and two-thirds and a narrower terminal fascia, the postmedian band forming a small while spot on the costa at three-fifths. There are two small round spots of the dark ground colour transversely placed on the end of the cell. The hindwings are dark fuscous, lighter in the disc and towards the base.
