= Santiago de Quero =

- Location within Ecuador
- Coordinates: 01°23′0″S 78°37′0″W
- Country: Ecuador
- Province: Tungurahua Province
- Canton: Quero Canton

Government
  - Mayor: Raul Gavilanez Silva

Area
  - Total: 2.4 km^{2} (0.93 sq mi)

Population (2022 census)
  - Total: 3,269
  - Density: 1,400/km^{2} (3,500/sq mi)
- Time zone: ECT
- Climate: Cfb
- Website: www.quero.gov.ec

Santiago de Quero or simply Quero is a location in the Tungurahua Province, Ecuador. It is the seat of the Quero Canton.
