= Moca mitrodeta =

Scientific classification
- Domain: Eukaryota
- Kingdom: Animalia
- Phylum: Arthropoda
- Class: Insecta
- Order: Lepidoptera
- Family: Immidae
- Genus: Moca
- Species: M. mitrodeta

Binomial name
- Moca mitrodeta Meyrick, 1922

Synonyms
- Imma mitrodeta Meyrick, 1922

Species of moth

Moca mitrodeta is a moth in the family Immidae. It was described by Edward Meyrick in 1922. It is found in Peru.

The wingspan is about 15 mm. The forewings are dark purplish fuscous with a very short pale ochreous basal mark in the middle and a dot above it, as well as a fine pale ochreous subcostal line from the base to two-fifths, and an interrupted streak of irroration (sprinkles) above it. A similar fine line is found along the fold from the base to the middle, and one in the disc from before one-third to two-thirds. The costal edge is pale ochreous about two-thirds, with a pale ochreous dash beneath this. There are scattered pale greenish scales anteriorly, and an indistinct fascia of pale greenish irroration from two-thirds of the costa to before the middle of the dorsum. An indistinct curved series of small groups of pale greenish scales is found from three-fourths of the costa to the dorsum before the tornus, below the middle two or three larger obscure pale ochreous spots on this. A pre-marginal series of small cloudy pale ochreous spots is found around the posterior part of the costa and termen and there is a terminal series of cloudy darker dots separated by slight pale marks. The hindwings are dark grey.
