= Tisaleo Canton =

- Canton
- Tungurahua Province in Ecuador

- Tisaleo Canton in Tungurahua Province
- Coordinates: 01°21′0″S 78°40′0″W
- Country: Ecuador
- Province: Tungurahua Province
- Capital: Tisaleo

Area
  - Total: 59.59 km^{2} (23.01 sq mi)

Population (2022 census)
  - Total: 13,910
  - Density: 233.4/km^{2} (604.6/sq mi)
- Time zone: UTC-5 (ECT)

Tisaleo Canton is a canton of Ecuador, located in the Tungurahua Province. Its capital is the town of Tisaleo. Its population at the 2001 census was 10,525.
