= Moca niphostoma =

Scientific classification
- Domain: Eukaryota
- Kingdom: Animalia
- Phylum: Arthropoda
- Class: Insecta
- Order: Lepidoptera
- Family: Immidae
- Genus: Moca
- Species: M. niphostoma

Binomial name
- Moca niphostoma (Meyrick, 1922)

Synonyms
- Imma niphostoma Meyrick, 1922

Species of moth

Moca niphostoma is a moth in the family Immidae. It was described by Edward Meyrick in 1922. It is found in Brazil.

The wingspan is about 20 mm. The forewings are dark purplish fuscous, posteriorly bronzy tinged, irregularly irrorated (sprinkled) with pale greenish, leaving the costa dark, with two dark spots anteriorly and larger blotches at the middle and three-fourths, the costal edge towards two-thirds white. There are two small suffused dark spots on the end of the cell, and a suffused dark blotch beneath, confluent with a lower, a suffused pale green-ochreous longitudinal mark on each side of the lower. The hindwings are dark grey.
