= Moca humbertella =

Scientific classification
- Kingdom: Animalia
- Phylum: Arthropoda
- Class: Insecta
- Order: Lepidoptera
- Family: Immidae
- Genus: Moca
- Species: M. humbertella

Binomial name
- Moca humbertella (Viette, 1956)

Synonyms
- Imma humbertella Viette, 1956

Species of moth

Moca humbertella is a moth in the family Immidae. It was described by Viette in 1956. It is found on Madagascar.
