= Moca roscida =

Scientific classification
- Domain: Eukaryota
- Kingdom: Animalia
- Phylum: Arthropoda
- Class: Insecta
- Order: Lepidoptera
- Family: Immidae
- Genus: Moca
- Species: M. roscida

Binomial name
- Moca roscida (Meyrick, 1922)

Synonyms
- Imma roscida Meyrick, 1922

Species of moth

Moca roscida is a moth in the family Immidae. It was described by Edward Meyrick in 1922. It is found in Brazil.

The wingspan is 18–21 mm. The forewings are dark purplish fuscous with a pale ochreous basal mark not reaching the margins and a darker subcostal streak from the base to one-third, edged beneath by a fine pale ochreous line towards the base, interrupted in the middle and edged above on the posterior half with pale greenish-ochreous irroration (sprinkles). The basal half, except near the base and costa, is irregularly irrorated with pale whitish greenish and the costal edge is shortly pale ochreous about two-thirds, beneath this a transverse patch of whitish-greenish irroration reaching halfway across the wing, surrounding a transverse discal mark of ground colour, its lower extremity edged on each side by a short longitudinal whitish mark. There is also some slight pale irroration between this and the dorsum and an irregular fascia of pale whitish-greenish irroration from the disc at four-fifths to the tornus and an indistinct transverse streak of pale irroration near the termen. A series of cloudy dark dots is found just before the termen, between these a terminal series of indistinct dots of pale ochreous irroration. The hindwings are dark grey.
