= Tisaleo =

- Location within Ecuador
- Coordinates: 01°21′0″S 78°40′0″W
- Country: Ecuador
- Province: Tungurahua Province
- Canton: Tisaleo Canton

Government
  - Mayor: Ing. Milton Gerardo Ramirez Naranjo

Area
  - Total: 1.27 km^{2} (0.49 sq mi)

Population (2022 census)
  - Total: 1,561
  - Density: 1,230/km^{2} (3,180/sq mi)
- Time zone: ECT
- Climate: Cfb

Tisaleo is a location in the Tungurahua Province, Ecuador and is the seat of the Tisaleo Canton.
