= Moca oxystoma =

Scientific classification
- Domain: Eukaryota
- Kingdom: Animalia
- Phylum: Arthropoda
- Class: Insecta
- Order: Lepidoptera
- Family: Immidae
- Genus: Moca
- Species: M. oxystoma

Binomial name
- Moca oxystoma (Bradley, 1962)

Synonyms
- Imma oxystoma Bradley, 1962

Species of moth

Moca oxystoma is a moth in the family Immidae. It was described by John David Bradley in 1962. It is found on Vanuatu in the South Pacific.
