= Moca semilinea =

Scientific classification
- Kingdom: Animalia
- Phylum: Arthropoda
- Class: Insecta
- Order: Lepidoptera
- Family: Immidae
- Genus: Moca
- Species: M. semilinea

Binomial name
- Moca semilinea (Walker, 1866)

Synonyms
- Jobula semilinea Walker, 1866

Species of moth

Moca semilinea is a moth in the family Immidae. It was described by Francis Walker in 1866. It is found on the Sulu Archipelago in the southwestern Philippines.

Adults are blackish brown, the body beneath and the legs white. The head is white in front and the palpi are whitish, the second joint with a blackish-brown line on the outer side. The tibiae are brown above. The forewings have an ochraceous point at the base and with two ochraceous lines which extend from near the base to about half the length. There is a marginal line of dull ochraceous points, which successively decrease in size from the tip to the interior angle. The hindwings have two broad cinereous streaks on the underside.
