= Patate Canton =

- Canton
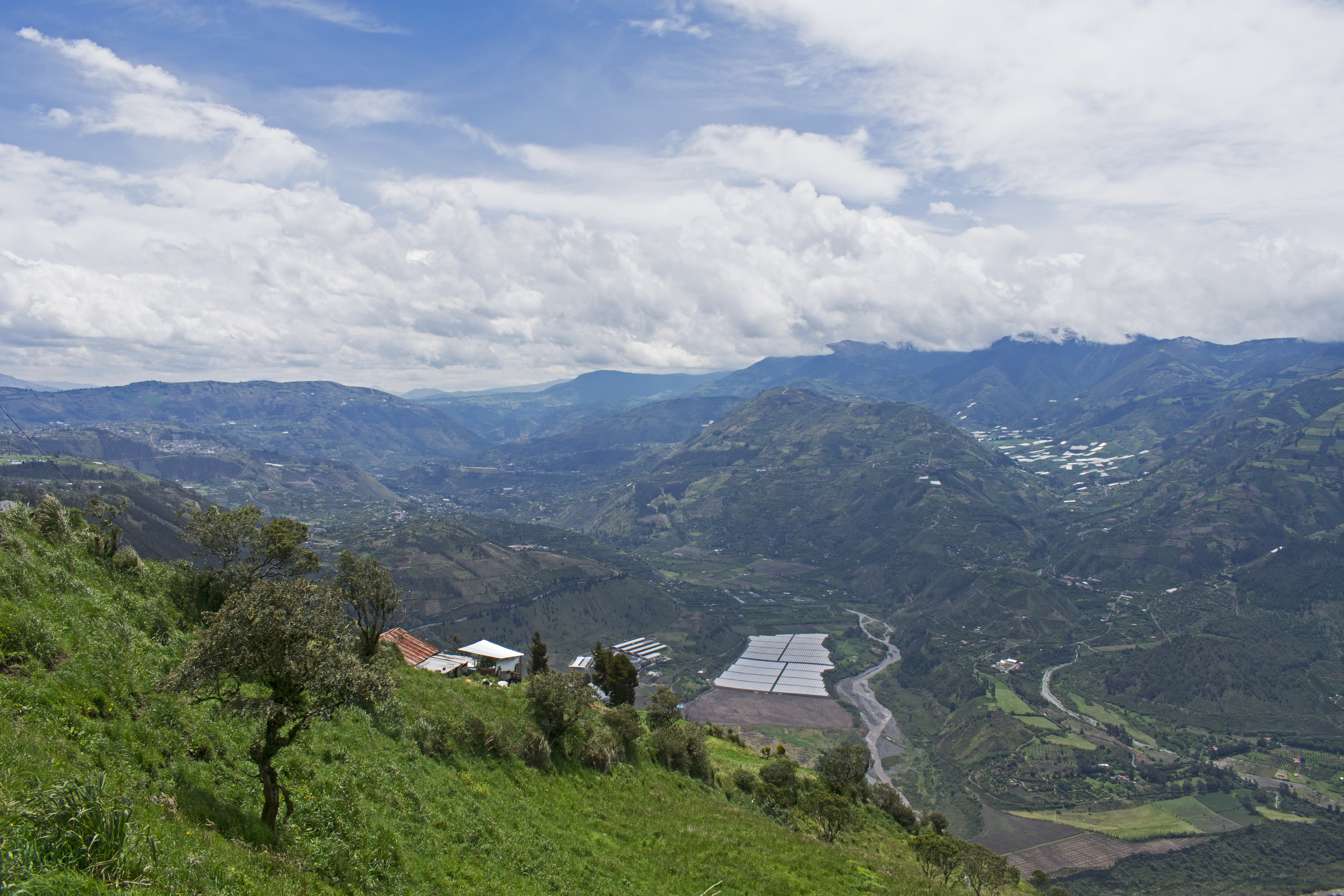
- The Patate River and Patate seen from E304 in Huambaló

- Tungurahua Province in Ecuador

- Patate Canton in Tungurahua Province
- Coordinates: 01°19′S 78°31′W
- Country: Ecuador
- Province: Tungurahua Province
- Capital: Patate

Government
  - Mayor: Medardo Chiliquinga

Area
  - Total: 292.3 km^{2} (112.9 sq mi)

Population (2022 census)
  - Total: 13,879
  - Density: 47.48/km^{2} (123.0/sq mi)
- Time zone: UTC-5 (ECT)
- Area code: 593
- Website: Patate Autonomous Decentralized Government

Patate Canton is a canton of Ecuador, located in the Tungurahua Province. Its capital is the town of Patate. Its population at the 2010 census was 13,497.

The still active Tungurahua volcano is situated within the canton.

Patate (town and canton) was declared a Pueblo Mágico (magical town) by Ecuador's Ministry of Tourism (MINTUR) in 2019. It was the first community in the country to be awarded this distinction.
