= Moca selenaspis =

Scientific classification
- Domain: Eukaryota
- Kingdom: Animalia
- Phylum: Arthropoda
- Class: Insecta
- Order: Lepidoptera
- Family: Immidae
- Genus: Moca
- Species: M. selenaspis

Binomial name
- Moca selenaspis (Meyrick, 1925)

Synonyms
- Imma selenaspis Meyrick, 1925

Species of moth

Moca selenaspis is a moth in the family Immidae. It was described by Edward Meyrick in 1925. It is found on Borneo.

The wingspan is about 27 mm. The forewings are blackish with an elongate-oval ochreous-yellow spot beneath the costa near the base, and a shorter elongate almost adjacent the spot beneath it. There is a round ochreous-yellow blotch in the middle of the disc and the extreme apical edge is white. The hindwings are ochreous yellow, the base irregularly blackish, prominent in the disc, and sending a subdorsal streak into the terminal band. There is a broad blackish terminal band, the edge triangularly prominent below the middle.
