= Moca discophora =

Scientific classification
- Domain: Eukaryota
- Kingdom: Animalia
- Phylum: Arthropoda
- Class: Insecta
- Order: Lepidoptera
- Family: Immidae
- Genus: Moca
- Species: M. discophora

Binomial name
- Moca discophora (Durrant, 1915)

Synonyms
- Imma discophora Durrant, 1915

Species of moth

Moca discophora is a moth in the family Immidae. It was described by John Hartley Durrant in 1915. It is found on New Guinea.
