= Patate =

- Town
- Location within Ecuador
- Coordinates: 01°19′S 78°31′W
- Country: Ecuador
- Province: Tungurahua
- Canton: Patate Canton

Government
  - Mayor: Hernán Medina

Area
  - Town: 1.09 km^{2} (0.42 sq mi)

Population (2022 census)
  - Town: 2,514
  - Density: 2,310/km^{2} (5,970/sq mi)
- Time zone: ECT
- Area code: 593
- Climate: Cfb
- Website: Patate Autonomous Decentralized Government

https://www.patateturismo.com Patate is a town in Ecuador in the Tungurahua Province in northwestern South America between San Juan de Ambato and Baños. It is located close to the foothills of the still active Tungurahua volcano.

Patate was declared a Pueblo Mágico (magical town) by Ecuador's Ministry of Tourism (MINTUR) in 2019. It was the first town in the country to be awarded this distinction.

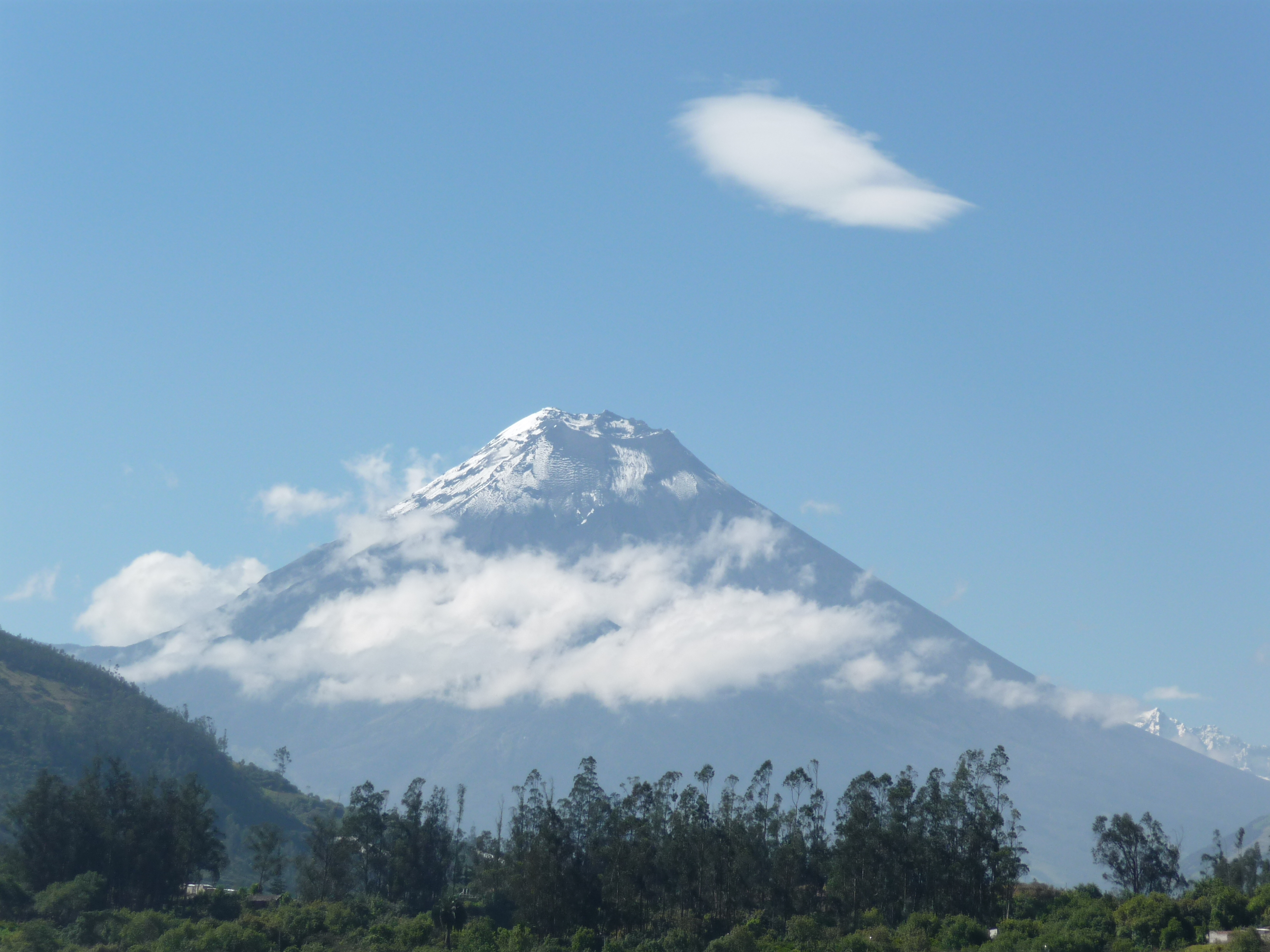
Tungurahua volcano as seen from Patate

== Climate ==
Climate data for Patate, elevation 2,360 m (7,740 ft), (1971–2000)
Month	Jan	Feb	Mar	Apr	May	Jun	Jul	Aug	Sep	Oct	Nov	Dec	Year
Mean daily maximum °C (°F)	22.8 (73.0)	22.7 (72.9)	22.6 (72.7)	22.6 (72.7)	22.4 (72.3)	20.7 (69.3)	20.0 (68.0)	20.6 (69.1)	22.0 (71.6)	22.9 (73.2)	23.9 (75.0)	23.4 (74.1)	22.2 (72.0)
Mean daily minimum °C (°F)	11.4 (52.5)	11.6 (52.9)	11.8 (53.2)	11.9 (53.4)	11.7 (53.1)	11.0 (51.8)	10.5 (50.9)	10.3 (50.5)	10.6 (51.1)	11.2 (52.2)	11.1 (52.0)	11.3 (52.3)	11.2 (52.2)
Average precipitation mm (inches)	22.0 (0.87)	34.0 (1.34)	53.0 (2.09)	50.0 (1.97)	52.0 (2.05)	77.0 (3.03)	58.0 (2.28)	57.0 (2.24)	49.0 (1.93)	47.0 (1.85)	44.0 (1.73)	27.0 (1.06)	570 (22.44)
Average relative humidity (%)	81	81	81	81	82	84	84	83	83	81	80	80	82
Source: FAO
