= Moca velutina =

Scientific classification
- Kingdom: Animalia
- Phylum: Arthropoda
- Class: Insecta
- Order: Lepidoptera
- Family: Immidae
- Genus: Moca
- Species: M. velutina

Binomial name
- Moca velutina Walker, 1863

Synonyms
- Imma velutina

Species of moth

Moca velutina is a moth in the family Immidae. It was described by Francis Walker in 1863. It is found in Sri Lanka.

Adults are cinereous brown, the thorax with five paler stripes, of which the inner pair are abbreviated in front. The abdomen is more cinereous. The forewings have several diffuse pale cinereous streaks, with black submarginal streaks, and with black connected marginal points. There is a discal mark consisting of a short black streak and an exterior black lunule. The hindwings are cinereous along part of the exterior border.
