= Pillaro =

Santiago de Píllaro
- Town
- Location within Ecuador
- Coordinates: 1°10′S 78°32′W
- Country: Ecuador
- Province: Tungurahua
- Canton: Píllaro

Government
  - Mayor: Dr. Patricio Sarabia

Area
  - Total: 5.31 km^{2} (2.05 sq mi)
- Elevation: 2,803 m (9,196 ft)

Population (2022 census)
  - Total: 9,816
  - Density: 1,850/km^{2} (4,790/sq mi)
- Demonym: Pillarenos
- Time zone: UTC-5 (ECT)
- Climate: Cfb

Píllaro (Spanish: [ˈpiʝaɾo]) is a town in Ecuador, located in the province of Tungurahua. It is the capital of the Píllaro Canton and stands about 19 km northeast of Ambato, the provincial capital.

The town is located on a high Andean plain, at an altitude of 2,800 metres above sea level and has an average temperature of around 13 degrees Celsius. It is an agricultural centre, producing primarily cereals, potatoes, and fruit (mainly apples). It is also known as a centre for wood-carving.

== History ==
Rumiñahui, the famous Incan military commander, was born in Huaynacuri de Píllaro, around 1482. Son of Huayna Cápac and Nary Ati. Down the maternal line his grandparents were Pillahuaso Ati, Cacique de Píllaro and the Queen Choasanguil. His name means "face of stone". El Congreso Nacional (the National Congress) in 1985, decided that 1 December be remembered as a commemoration of the country's indigenous hero and a defender of the Kingdom of Quito against the Spanish conquistadors.

Píllaro was founded in 1570 by Antonio Clavijo. Píllaro became a separate canton in 1851. The town was heavily damaged in the 1949 earthquake that similarly devastated the nearby towns of Ambato and Pelileo.

== Geography ==
Pillaro is considered a gateway to the Llanganates National Park. This is the site of the legend of the Llangantes. The legends goes that Rumiñahui, on his way to Cajamarca to pay off the Spanish conquistadors, hid Incan gold in the park. The gold was supposed to go to Francisco Pizarro to pay the ransom for the kidnapped Incan king, Atahualpa. Rumiñahui, on learning that his king had been killed, sidetracked to the deserted páramo of the Llanganates and buried the gold. Many in Pillaro encourage the story, insisting that the town is full of secrets and legends.

Pillaro is divided into 7 districts:

- Baquerizo Moreno
- Emilio María Terán (Rumipamba)
- Marcos Espinel (Chacata)
- Presidente Urbina (Chagrapamba)
- San Andrés
- San José de Poaló
- San Miguelito.

== Climate ==
Climate data for Pillaro, elevation 2,805 m (9,203 ft), (1971–2000)
| Month | Jan | Feb | Mar | Apr | May | Jun | Jul | Aug | Sep | Oct | Nov | Dec | Year |
|---|---|---|---|---|---|---|---|---|---|---|---|---|---|
| Mean daily maximum °C (°F) | 19.4 (66.9) | 19.6 (67.3) | 18.8 (65.8) | 18.8 (65.8) | 18.6 (65.5) | 17.3 (63.1) | 16.9 (62.4) | 17.5 (63.5) | 18.4 (65.1) | 19.7 (67.5) | 20.6 (69.1) | 19.8 (67.6) | 18.8 (65.8) |
| Mean daily minimum °C (°F) | 8.0 (46.4) | 8.2 (46.8) | 8.3 (46.9) | 8.5 (47.3) | 8.5 (47.3) | 7.8 (46.0) | 7.5 (45.5) | 7.1 (44.8) | 7.5 (45.5) | 7.8 (46.0) | 7.5 (45.5) | 8.0 (46.4) | 7.9 (46.2) |
| Average precipitation mm (inches) | 47.0 (1.85) | 63.0 (2.48) | 84.0 (3.31) | 73.0 (2.87) | 61.0 (2.40) | 57.0 (2.24) | 44.0 (1.73) | 41.0 (1.61) | 57.0 (2.24) | 62.0 (2.44) | 72.0 (2.83) | 44.0 (1.73) | 705 (27.73) |
| Average relative humidity (%) | 75 | 76 | 78 | 76 | 78 | 79 | 81 | 76 | 76 | 75 | 73 | 73 | 76 |
Source: FAO
