= Moca zophodes =

Scientific classification
- Domain: Eukaryota
- Kingdom: Animalia
- Phylum: Arthropoda
- Class: Insecta
- Order: Lepidoptera
- Family: Immidae
- Genus: Moca
- Species: M. zophodes

Binomial name
- Moca zophodes (Meyrick, 1909)

Synonyms
- Imma zophodes Meyrick, 1909

Species of moth

Moca zophodes is a moth in the family Immidae. It was described by Edward Meyrick in 1909. It is found in Bolivia.

The wingspan is 16–17 mm. The forewings are rather dark fuscous, slightly and irregularly whitish sprinkled and with a small white discal dot at three-fifths and a dark fuscous terminal line. The hindwings are rather dark fuscous.
