= Moca radiata =

Scientific classification
- Domain: Eukaryota
- Kingdom: Animalia
- Phylum: Arthropoda
- Class: Insecta
- Order: Lepidoptera
- Family: Immidae
- Genus: Moca
- Species: M. radiata

Binomial name
- Moca radiata (Walsingham, 1897)

Synonyms
- Jobula radiata Walsingham, 1897; Imma radiata

Species of moth

Moca radiata is a moth in the family Immidae. It was described by Thomas de Grey in 1897. It is found in the Democratic Republic of the Congo and Gabon.

The wingspan is 17–18 mm. The forewings are dark olive grey, with orange-ochreous lines marking the interspaces between the veins, the extreme base of the costa is narrowly orange ochreous. A distinct orange-ochreous line, commencing near the base beneath the costa, follows the upper edge of the cell to the middle of the wing length, this is followed by some spots of the same colour about the upper angle of the cell, diverging obliquely downwards and nearly joining the outer end of a median streak of the same colour, which terminates in the direction of the base at half the length of the cell. There is also a line of the same colour along the fold and some suffusion of orange-ochreous scales beneath it. Beyond the end of the cell a series of 9 or 10 separate orange-ochreous lines diverge fan like between the veins. They are margined, at their outer ends, by a distinct semicircle of the olive-grey ground colour, which is followed by an orange-ochreous space, also semicircular, but not attaining the margins, the apical space being dark olive grey. The hindwings are brown.
