= Moca pelinactis =

Scientific classification
- Kingdom: Animalia
- Phylum: Arthropoda
- Class: Insecta
- Order: Lepidoptera
- Family: Immidae
- Genus: Moca
- Species: M. pelinactis

Binomial name
- Moca pelinactis (Meyrick, 1925)

Synonyms
- Imma pelinactis Meyrick, 1925

Species of moth

Moca pelinactis is a moth in the family Immidae. It was described by Edward Meyrick in 1925. It is found in Cameroon.

The wingspan is about 21 mm. The forewings are rather light grey, from the base to the end of the cell almost wholly suffused with light ochreous, except for a grey line beneath the pale ochreous costal edge, beyond the cell with suffused light ochreous streaks between the veins not quite reaching a curved light ochreous streak which runs from three-fourths of the costa near the margin to the tornus, and emits short lines anteriorly on the veins passing between the interneural streaks. The grey marginal streak beyond this is slightly bluish tinged. The hindwings are rather dark grey.
