= Moca tormentata =

Scientific classification
- Domain: Eukaryota
- Kingdom: Animalia
- Phylum: Arthropoda
- Class: Insecta
- Order: Lepidoptera
- Family: Immidae
- Genus: Moca
- Species: M. tormentata

Binomial name
- Moca tormentata (Meyrick, 1921)

Synonyms
- Imma tormentata Meyrick, 1921

Species of moth

Moca tormentata is a moth in the family Immidae. It was described by Edward Meyrick in 1921. It is found in the Democratic Republic of the Congo and South Africa.

The wingspan is 19–20 mm. The forewings are rather dark fuscous, somewhat mixed irregularly with olive greenish grey. Sometimes, there is an inwards-oblique fasciate blotch of whitish suffusion from the middle of the costa reaching more than halfway across the wing, tinged with pale blue especially on the lower portion, preceded towards the costa by a patch of blackish-fuscous suffusion, in the other specimens this is replaced by an irregular median fascia of blackish-fuscous suffusion. A transverse blackish mark is found on the end of the cell and the posterior area beyond this is more or less mixed with greyish-ochreous irroration or marbling, with two curved transverse series of short blackish-fuscous interneural streaks. There is also a blackish-fuscous terminal shade. The hindwings are rather dark grey, lighter anteriorly.
