= Moca albodiscata =

Scientific classification
- Kingdom: Animalia
- Phylum: Arthropoda
- Clade: Pancrustacea
- Class: Insecta
- Order: Lepidoptera
- Family: Immidae
- Genus: Moca
- Species: M. albodiscata

Binomial name
- Moca albodiscata (Walker, 1863)

Synonyms
- Adricara albodiscata Walker, 1863

Species of moth

Moca albodiscata is a moth in the family Immidae. It was described by Francis Walker in 1863. It is found in Tefé, Brazil.

Adults are blackish brown, silvery white beneath. The thorax has a testaceous stripe on each side. The forewings have a whitish-testaceous tinged and slightly hyaline disk and there is a cinereous diffuse and interrupted submarginal band. The marginal points are black and the costa is mostly cinereous.
