= Moca ethirastis =

Scientific classification
- Domain: Eukaryota
- Kingdom: Animalia
- Phylum: Arthropoda
- Class: Insecta
- Order: Lepidoptera
- Family: Immidae
- Genus: Moca
- Species: M. ethirastis

Binomial name
- Moca ethirastis (Meyrick, 1922)

Synonyms
- Imma ethirastis Meyrick, 1922

Species of moth

Moca ethirastis is a moth in the family Immidae. It was described by Edward Meyrick in 1922. It is found in Peru.

The wingspan is 18–22 mm. The forewings are dark fuscous, the basal half irregularly strewn with pale greenish-ochreous scales, two successive darker dashes beneath the costa from the base suffusedly edged with these. A darker transverse mark is found on the end of the cell, partially edged with similar scales, connected with the costa by a suffused group, its lower extremity interrupting a pale greenish-ochreous longitudinal line from one-fourth to two-thirds of the disc. An angulated series of small groups of pale greenish-ochreous scales from two-thirds of the costa to the dorsum before the tornus, some smaller and less distinct groups before the termen. The hindwings are dark grey, in males with a large expanded tuft of long ochreous-whitish hairs from the base lying beneath the forewings and spreading over the disc.
