= Moca nipharcha =

Scientific classification
- Domain: Eukaryota
- Kingdom: Animalia
- Phylum: Arthropoda
- Class: Insecta
- Order: Lepidoptera
- Family: Immidae
- Genus: Moca
- Species: M. nipharcha

Binomial name
- Moca nipharcha (Meyrick, 1931)

Synonyms
- Imma nipharcha Meyrick, 1931

Species of moth

Moca nipharcha is a moth in the family Immidae. It was described by Edward Meyrick in 1931. It is found in Brazil.
