= Pelileo Canton =

Coordinates: 1°19′39″S 78°32′27″W

- Canton
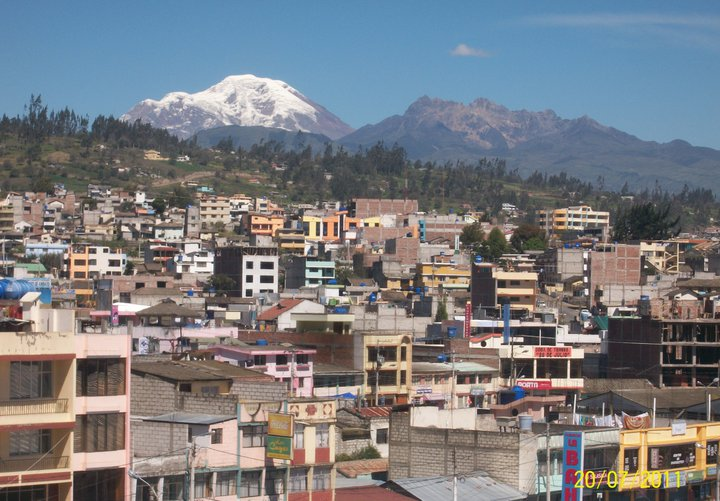
- Pelileo

- Tungurahua Province in Ecuador

- Pelileo Canton in Tungurahua Province
- Country: Ecuador
- Province: Tungurahua Province
- Capital: Pelileo

Area
  - Total: 199.4 km^{2} (77.0 sq mi)

Population (2022 census)
  - Total: 63,897
  - Density: 320.4/km^{2} (830.0/sq mi)
- Time zone: UTC-5 (ECT)

Pelileo Canton is a canton of Ecuador, located in the Tungurahua Province. Its capital is the town of Pelileo. Its population at the 2001 census was 48,988.
