= Moca chlorolepis =

Scientific classification
- Domain: Eukaryota
- Kingdom: Animalia
- Phylum: Arthropoda
- Class: Insecta
- Order: Lepidoptera
- Family: Immidae
- Genus: Moca
- Species: M. chlorolepis

Binomial name
- Moca chlorolepis (Walsingham, 1900)

Synonyms
- Tortricomorpha chlorolepis Walsingham, 1900

Species of moth

Moca chlorolepis is a moth in the family Immidae. It was described by Thomas de Grey in 1900. It is found on Christmas Island.
