= Moca rugosella =

Scientific classification
- Domain: Eukaryota
- Kingdom: Animalia
- Phylum: Arthropoda
- Class: Insecta
- Order: Lepidoptera
- Family: Immidae
- Genus: Moca
- Species: M. rugosella

Binomial name
- Moca rugosella (Busck, 1914)

Synonyms
- Imma rugosella Busck, 1914

Species of moth

Moca rugosella is a moth in the family Immidae. It was described by August Busck in 1914. It is found in Guyana.

The wingspan is 17 mm. The forewings are light ochreous brown, the costa yellowish with a small black dot at the basal third and a larger one on the middle. There is a subcostal, black, interrupted longitudinal streak edged dorsally by a yellow longitudinal line and an ill-defined group of black dots at the apical third of the costa and at the end of the cell. A series of black dots is found around the apical and terminal margin, edged with yellow. The hindwings are dark brown.

The larvae have been recorded feeding on Securidica species.
