= Moca aphrodora =

Scientific classification
- Domain: Eukaryota
- Kingdom: Animalia
- Phylum: Arthropoda
- Class: Insecta
- Order: Lepidoptera
- Family: Immidae
- Genus: Moca
- Species: M. aphrodora

Binomial name
- Moca aphrodora (Meyrick, 1922)

Synonyms
- Imma aphrodora Meyrick, 1922

Species of moth

Moca aphrodora is a species of moth in the family Immidae first described by Edward Meyrick in 1922. It is found in Brazil and Peru.

The wingspan is 17–22 mm. The forewings are dark purplish grey, with some irregularly strewn greyish-ochreous and whitish scales and a whitish-ochreous line on the upper margin of the cell from the base to one-fourth, edged with blackish above. There is a cloudy dark fuscous spot on the costa at one-fifth, preceded by a small whitish subcostal spot. There is an irregular series of three or four small cloudy dark fuscous spots between this and the dorsum. The anterior half of the fold is irregularly suffused with white, and an irregular transverse series of several small cloudy white spots before the middle, as well as an irregular dark fuscous blotch on the middle of the costa, the costa is ochreous white before and beyond this. Two transversely placed dark fuscous dots are found on the end of the cell, and there is a white line in the disc from one-fourth to between these and forming a small spot beyond them. An irregular curved incomplete series of small cloudy whitish spots runs from the costal ochreous-white space at two-thirds to near the dorsum at two-thirds, a blotch of dark fuscous suffusion preceding this beneath the cell. A suffused dark fuscous blotch is found on the costa at three-fourths, and there is a series of dark fuscous dots from the posterior angle of this parallel to the termen, roundish dark fuscous spots before and beyond this in the middle. There is also a terminal series of cloudy dark fuscous dots, with a faint whitish waved terminal line. The hindwings are dark grey.
