= Quero Canton =

- Canton
- Tungurahua Province in Ecuador

- Quero Canton in Tungurahua Province
- Coordinates: 1.3793°S 78.6070°W
- Country: Ecuador
- Province: Tungurahua Province
- Capital: Santiago de Quero

Area
  - Total: 169 km^{2} (65 sq mi)

Population (2022 census)
  - Total: 19,084
  - Density: 113/km^{2} (292/sq mi)
- Time zone: UTC-5 (ECT)

Quero Canton is a canton of Ecuador, located in the Tungurahua Province. Its capital is the town of Quero. Population at the 2001 census was 18,187.
