= Molybdenum cofactor cytidylyltransferase =

Identifiers
- EC no.: 2.7.7.76

Databases
- IntEnz: IntEnz view
- BRENDA: BRENDA entry
- ExPASy: NiceZyme view
- KEGG: KEGG entry
- MetaCyc: metabolic pathway
- PRIAM: profile
- PDB structures: RCSB PDB PDBe PDBsum
Search
- PMC: articles
- PubMed: articles
- NCBI: proteins

Molybdenum cofactor cytidylyltransferase (EC 2.7.7.76, MocA, CTP:molybdopterin cytidylyltransferase, MoCo cytidylyltransferase, Mo-MPT cytidyltransferase) is an enzyme with systematic name CTP:molybdenum cofactor cytidylyltransferase. This enzyme catalyses the following chemical reaction:

CTP + molybdenum cofactor $\rightleftharpoons$ diphosphate + cytidylyl molybdenum cofactor

Catalyses the cytidylation of the molybdenum cofactor.
