= Moca (moth) =

Scientific classification
- Domain: Eukaryota
- Kingdom: Animalia
- Phylum: Arthropoda
- Class: Insecta
- Order: Lepidoptera
- Family: Immidae
- Genus: Moca; Walker, 1863

Type species
- Moca velutina Walker, 1863

Species
- More than 45 species

Synonyms
- Adricara Walker, 1863; Alicadra Walker, 1866; Jobula Walker, 1866; Callartona Hampson, 1893

Genus of moths

Moca is a genus of moths in the family Immidae. The genus was erected by Francis Walker in 1863.

== Species ==
- Moca albodiscata (Walker, 1863)
- Moca antiquata Meyrick, 1913
- Moca aphrodora Meyrick, 1922
- Moca chelacma Meyrick, 1927
- Moca chlorolepis (Walsingham, 1900)
- Moca chrysocosma Diakonoff, 1967
- Moca discophora Durrant, 1915
- Moca ethirastis Meyrick, 1922
- Moca fungosa Meyrick, 1914
- Moca humbertella Viette, 1956
- Moca mitrodeta Meyrick, 1922
- Moca mniograpta Meyrick, 1931
- Moca nipharcha Meyrick, 1931
- Moca niphostoma Meyrick, 1922
- Moca oxystoma Bradley, 1962
- Moca pelinactis Meyrick, 1925
- Moca pelomacta Meyrick, 1922
- Moca purpurascens (Hampson, [1893])
- Moca radiata Walsingham, 1897
- Moca roscida Meyrick, 1922
- Moca rugosella Busck, 1914
- Moca selenaspis Meyrick, 1925
- Moca semilinea (Walker, 1866)
- Moca tormentata Meyrick, 1921
- Moca velutina Walker, 1863
- Moca vexatalis (Walker, [1866])
- Moca zophodes Meyrick, 1909

== Selected former species ==
- Moca aeluropis Meyrick, 1906
- Moca ancistrota Meyrick, 1912
- Moca auxobathra Meyrick, 1906
- Moca chasmatica Meyrick, 1906
- Moca chlorosoma Meyrick, 1906
- Moca congrualis Walsingham, 1900
- Moca cyclostoma Meyrick, 1906
- Moca metriodoxa Meyrick, 1906
- Moca nephallactis Meyrick, 1906
- Moca nephelastra Meyrick, 1906
- Moca neurota Meyrick, 1906
- Moca nubigena Meyrick, 1910
- Moca panopta Meyrick, 1906
- Moca pardalina Walker, 1863
- Moca phthorosema Meyrick, 1912
- Moca strepsizona Meyrick, 1906
- Moca synconista Meyrick, 1918
- Moca tesseraria Meyrick, 1906
- Moca tyrocnista Meyrick, 1906
