= Minnesota Ovarian Cancer Alliance =

U.S. non-profit organization

- Founded: 1999
- Location: Minnesota
- Website: mnovarian.org

The Minnesota Ovarian Cancer Alliance (MOCA) is an organization for women with ovarian cancer in the state of Minnesota. The organization raises public awareness of ovarian cancer and helps to fund medical research. MOCA was established in 1999.
