= Píllaro Canton =

- Canton
- Tungurahua Province in Ecuador

- Píllaro Canton in Tungurahua Province
- Coordinates: 1°10′S 78°32′W
- Country: Ecuador
- Province: Tungurahua Province

Area
  - Total: 469.4 km^{2} (181.2 sq mi)

Population (2022 census)
  - Total: 42,497
  - Density: 90.53/km^{2} (234.5/sq mi)
- Time zone: UTC-5 (ECT)

Píllaro Canton is a canton of Ecuador, located in the Tungurahua Province. Its capital is the town of Píllaro. Its population at the 2001 census was 34,925.

== Climate ==
Climate data for Píllaro, elevation 2,805 m (9,203 ft), (1971–2000)
Month	Jan	Feb	Mar	Apr	May	Jun	Jul	Aug	Sep	Oct	Nov	Dec	Year
Mean daily maximum °C (°F)	19.4 (66.9)	19.6 (67.3)	18.8 (65.8)	18.8 (65.8)	18.6 (65.5)	17.3 (63.1)	16.9 (62.4)	17.5 (63.5)	18.4 (65.1)	19.7 (67.5)	20.6 (69.1)	19.8 (67.6)	18.8 (65.8)
Mean daily minimum °C (°F)	8.0 (46.4)	8.2 (46.8)	8.3 (46.9)	8.5 (47.3)	8.5 (47.3)	7.8 (46.0)	7.5 (45.5)	7.1 (44.8)	7.5 (45.5)	7.8 (46.0)	7.5 (45.5)	8.0 (46.4)	7.9 (46.2)
Average precipitation mm (inches)	47.0 (1.85)	63.0 (2.48)	84.0 (3.31)	73.0 (2.87)	61.0 (2.40)	57.0 (2.24)	44.0 (1.73)	41.0 (1.61)	57.0 (2.24)	62.0 (2.44)	72.0 (2.83)	44.0 (1.73)	705 (27.73)
Average relative humidity (%)	75	76	78	76	78	79	81	76	76	75	73	73	76
Source: FAO

Climate data for Lake Pisayambo, elevation 3,615 m (11,860 ft), (1971–2000)
Month	Jan	Feb	Mar	Apr	May	Jun	Jul	Aug	Sep	Oct	Nov	Dec	Year
Mean daily maximum °C (°F)	11.7 (53.1)	11.4 (52.5)	11.4 (52.5)	11.5 (52.7)	10.9 (51.6)	9.7 (49.5)	8.6 (47.5)	8.5 (47.3)	9.9 (49.8)	12.2 (54.0)	12.5 (54.5)	11.6 (52.9)	10.8 (51.5)
Mean daily minimum °C (°F)	2.5 (36.5)	2.6 (36.7)	3.4 (38.1)	3.4 (38.1)	3.3 (37.9)	3.0 (37.4)	2.8 (37.0)	2.1 (35.8)	2.4 (36.3)	2.1 (35.8)	1.7 (35.1)	2.0 (35.6)	2.6 (36.7)
Average precipitation mm (inches)	52.0 (2.05)	90.0 (3.54)	103.0 (4.06)	118.0 (4.65)	99.0 (3.90)	162.0 (6.38)	142.0 (5.59)	115.0 (4.53)	92.0 (3.62)	85.0 (3.35)	81.0 (3.19)	80.0 (3.15)	1,219 (48.01)
Average relative humidity (%)	88	88	88	88	90	90	89	88	88	85	85	87	88
Source: FAO
