= Baños Canton =

- Canton
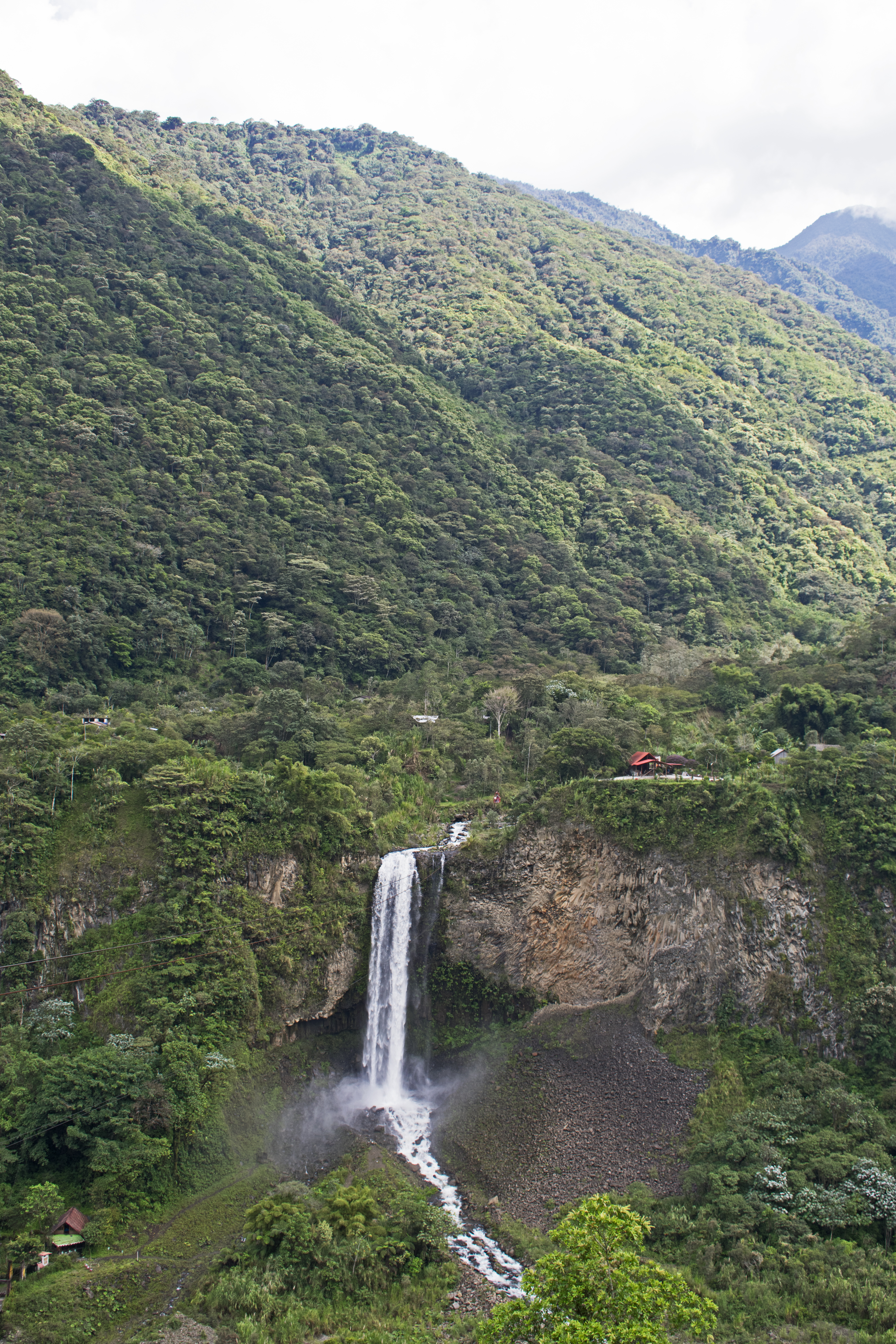
- Manto de la Novia waterfall

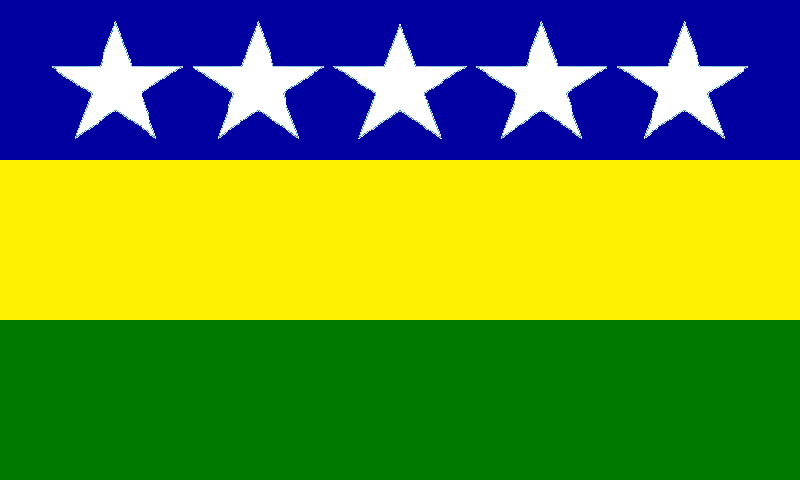
- Flag

- Tungurahua Province in Ecuador

- Baños Canton in Tungurahua Province
- Coordinates: 1°23′47″S 78°25′29″W
- Country: Ecuador
- Province: Tungurahua Province
- Capital: Baños de Agua Santa

Area
  - Total: 1,067 km^{2} (412 sq mi)

Population (2022 census)
  - Total: 21,908
  - Density: 20.53/km^{2} (53.18/sq mi)
- Time zone: UTC-5 (ECT)

Baños Canton is a canton of Ecuador, located in the Tungurahua Province. Its capital is the town of Baños. The population of Baños Canton at the 2010 census was 20,018., and in 2011 its population had risen to 21,140
