= Baños de Agua Santa =

- City
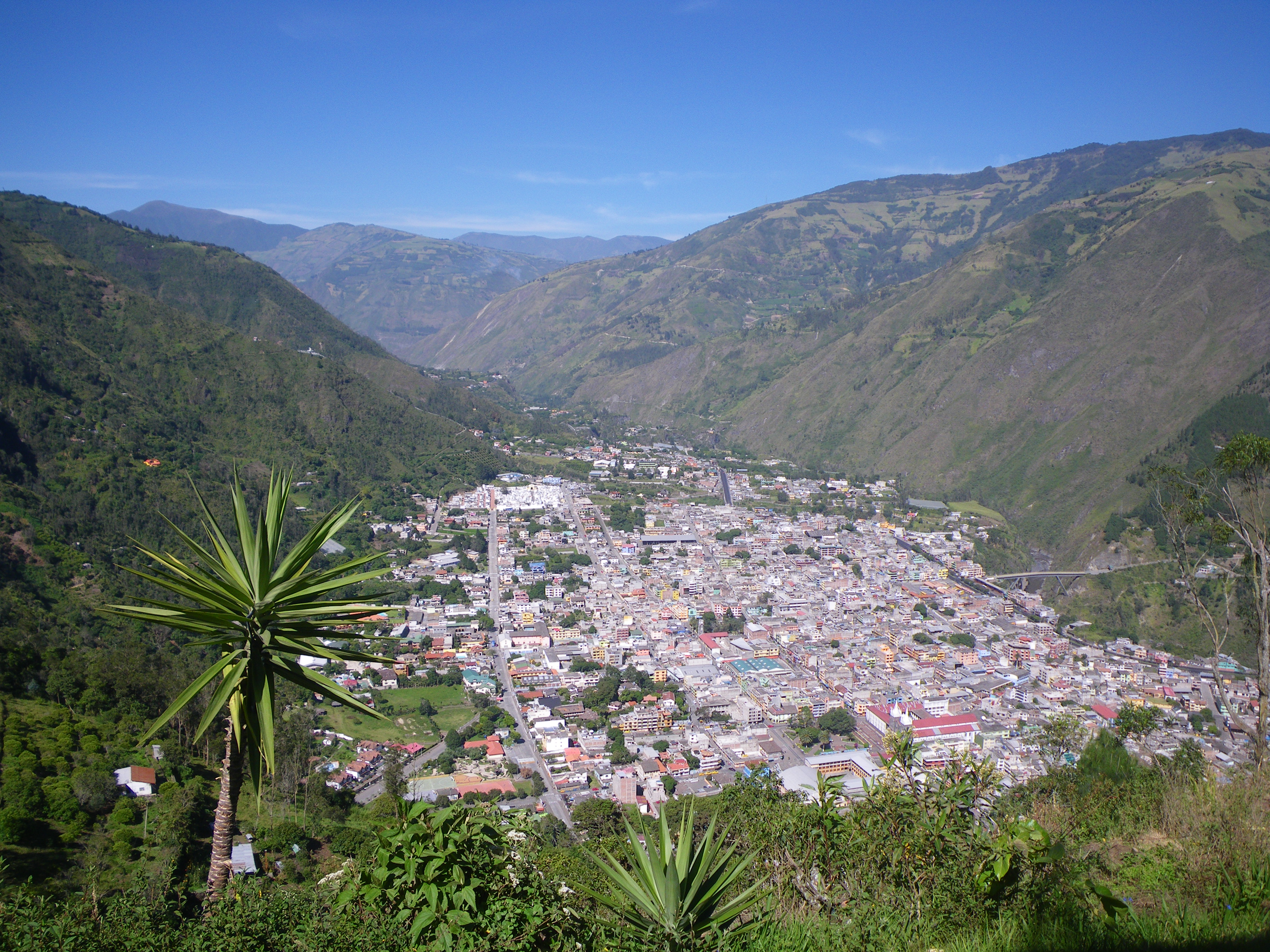
- Baños from the east

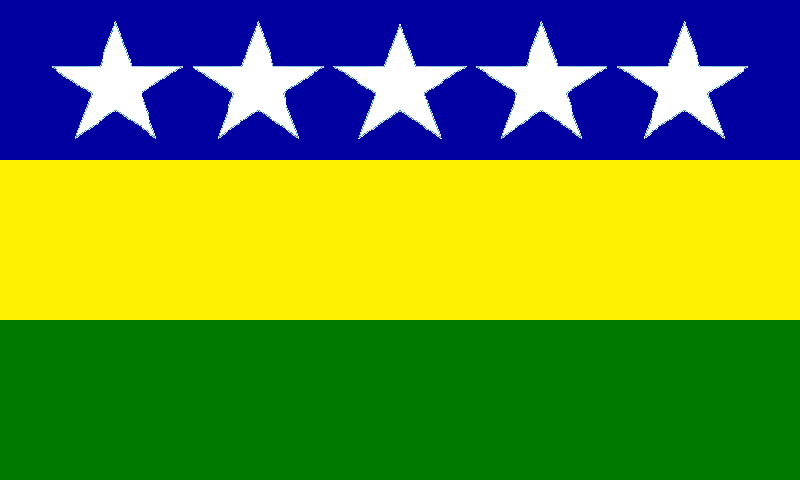
- Flag
- Nickname: Baños
- Location within Ecuador
- Coordinates: 1°23′47″S 78°25′29″W
- Country: Ecuador
- Province: Tungurahua
- Canton: Baños

Government
  - Type: Mayor and council
  - Mayor: Marlon Guevara

Area
  - City: 4.16 km^{2} (1.61 sq mi)
- Elevation: 1,820 m (5,970 ft)

Population (2022 census)
  - City: 14,100
  - Density: 3,390/km^{2} (8,780/sq mi)
- Demonym: Baneño(-a)
- Time zone: UTC-5 (ECT)
- Area code: (0)3
- Climate: Cfb
- Website: www.municipiobanos.gob.ec

Baños de Agua Santa (Spanish pronunciation: [ˈbaɲos ðe ˈaɣwa ˈsanta]), commonly referred to as Baños, is a city in eastern Tungurahua Province of Ecuador. Baños is the second most populous city in Tungurahua, after the capital Ambato, and is a major tourist center. Baños is known as the "Gateway to the Amazon," as it is the last city still located in the mountain region before reaching the jungle and other towns that are located in the Amazon River basin.

Baños is located at an elevation of 1,820 metres (5,971 feet) on the northern foothills of the Tungurahua volcano, whose activity has been characterized by frequent powerful ash explosions and lava flows that can be seen from Banos.

== Etymology ==
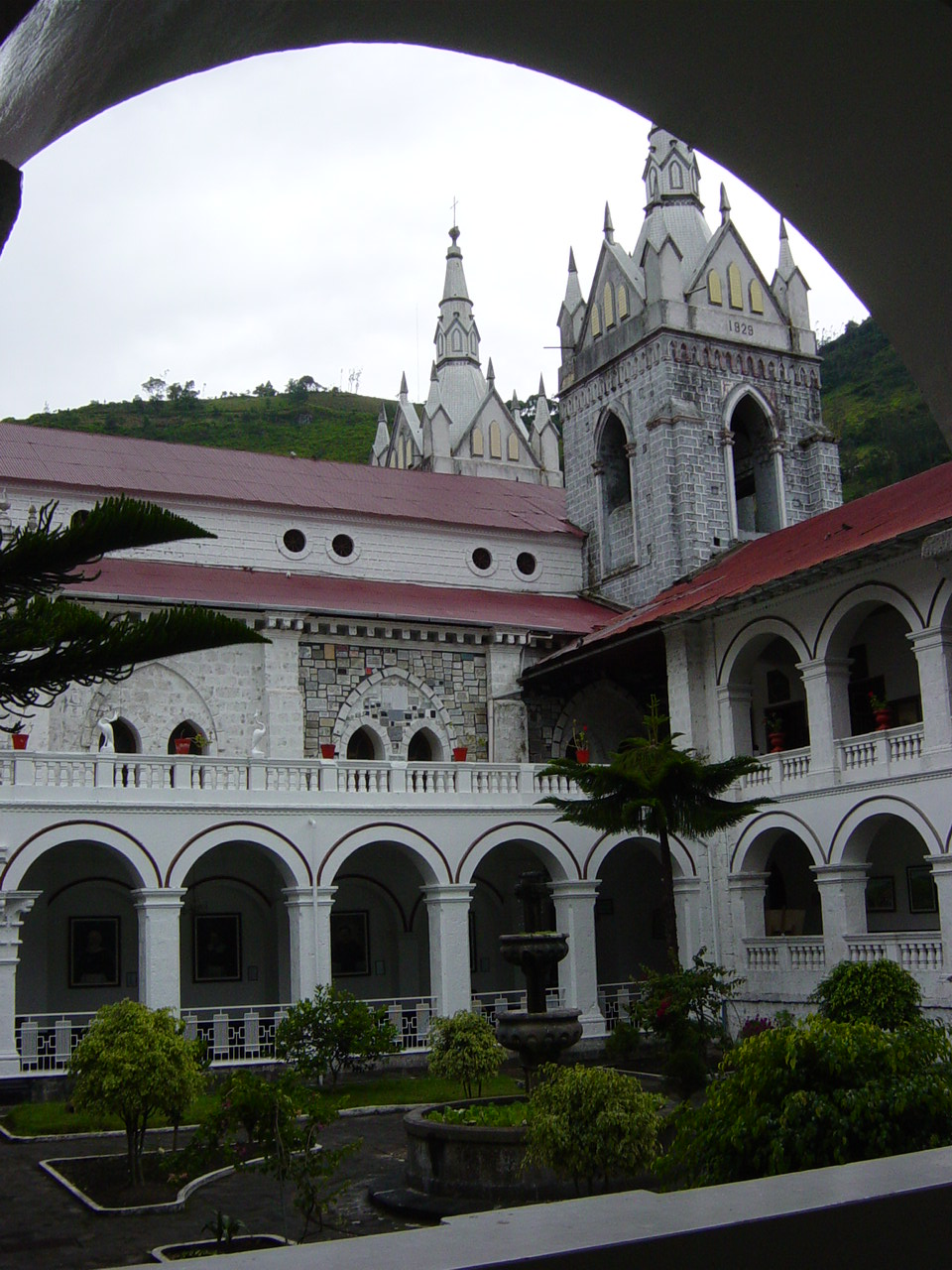
Court of La Iglesia de la Virgen de Agua Santa in Baños

Baños de Agua Santa (Spanish for Baths of Holy Water) is named after the hot springs located around the city which have a reputation of having healing properties due to the various minerals they contain.

== History ==
The city is also a Catholic religious center, as some Catholic believers say that the Virgin Mary appeared nearby a waterfall. Due to this belief, a sculpture of the virgin, called Virgen de Agua Santa, was placed in the city's cathedral.

The history of the town has been intimately linked to the highly-active Tungurahua volcano. In October 1999, all 17,000+ residents were forced to evacuate the city for weeks.

== Geography ==
Baños is located on the northern foothills of the Tungurahua volcano.

Along with the town Pillaro, Baños is known as a good starting point for exploring the remote Llanganates National Park and its attractions including Cerro Hermoso. The city itself has a main central park across from the cathedral.

Nearby waterfalls include Virgen de Agua Santa, Inés María, Agoyán, El Manto de la Novia, Pailón del Diablo and Machay.

== Economy ==
Baños is a popular tourist destination in Ecuador due to its natural environment (it is home to more than 60 waterfalls) and its adventure sports. Locals and visitors alike undertake rafting, kayaking, canyoning, bridge jumping, hiking, biking and horseback riding.

Baños is also known for its production of taffy (Spanish: melcocha [melˈkotʃa]) made from cane sugar, and for small shops that sell parrot sculptures made of balsa wood.

== Climate ==
Under the Köppen climate classification, Baños has a subtropical highland climate (Köppen: Cfb or Cwb).

Climate data for Baños de Agua Santa, elevation 1,843 m (6,047 ft), (1971–2000)
Month	Jan	Feb	Mar	Apr	May	Jun	Jul	Aug	Sep	Oct	Nov	Dec	Year
Mean daily maximum °C (°F)	22.2 (72.0)	22.3 (72.1)	22.3 (72.1)	22.3 (72.1)	22.2 (72.0)	21.4 (70.5)	20.7 (69.3)	21.2 (70.2)	22.0 (71.6)	22.7 (72.9)	23.2 (73.8)	22.7 (72.9)	22.1 (71.8)
Mean daily minimum °C (°F)	13.0 (55.4)	13.1 (55.6)	13.2 (55.8)	13.2 (55.8)	13.1 (55.6)	12.4 (54.3)	11.9 (53.4)	11.8 (53.2)	11.9 (53.4)	12.6 (54.7)	12.8 (55.0)	12.8 (55.0)	12.7 (54.8)
Average precipitation mm (inches)	76.0 (2.99)	81.0 (3.19)	103.0 (4.06)	120.0 (4.72)	140.0 (5.51)	208.0 (8.19)	190.0 (7.48)	162.0 (6.38)	136.0 (5.35)	98.0 (3.86)	66.0 (2.60)	67.0 (2.64)	1,447 (56.97)
Average relative humidity (%)	83	82	84	83	85	86	86	84	82	81	79	81	83
Source: FAO

== Gallery ==
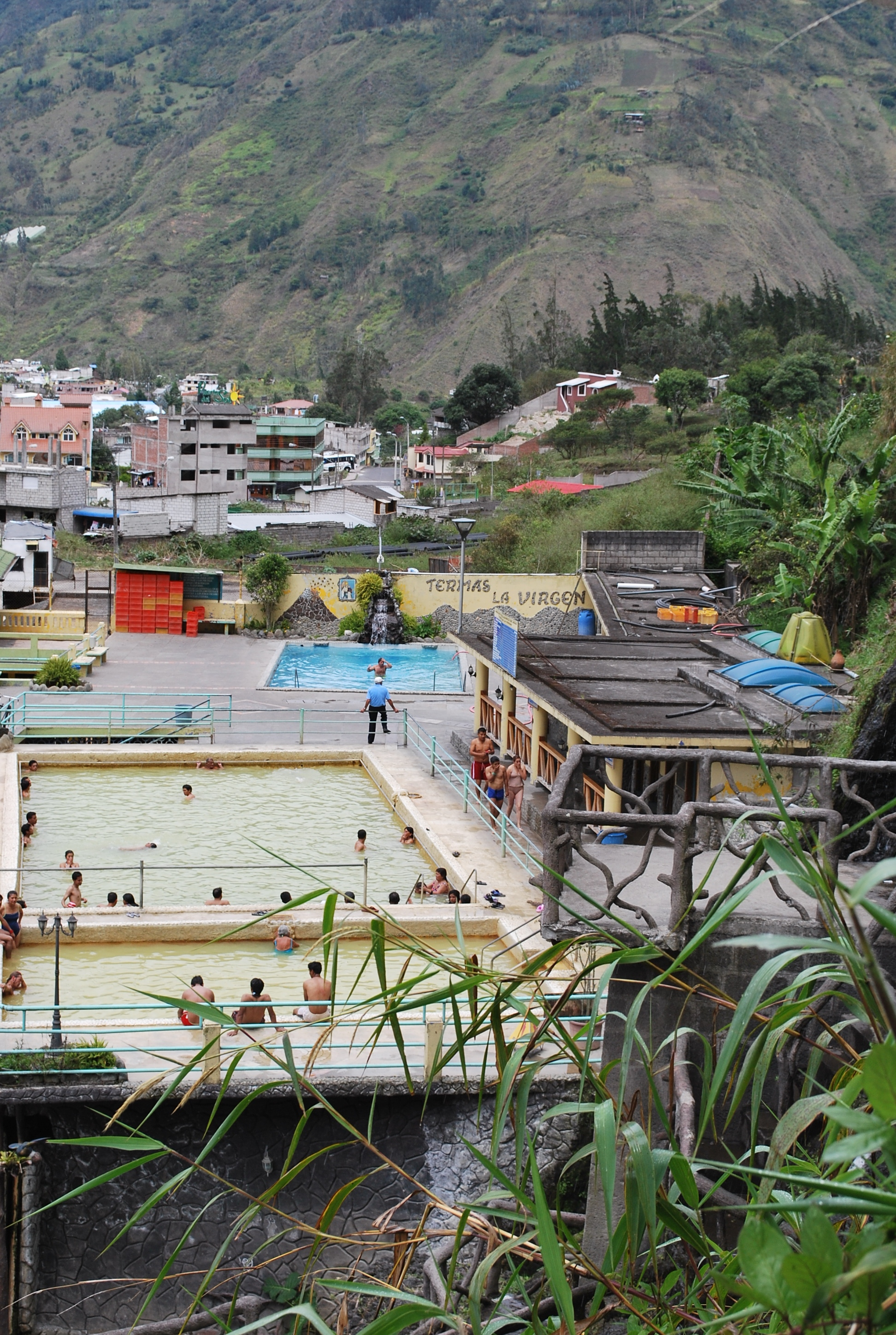
Thermal baths in Baños

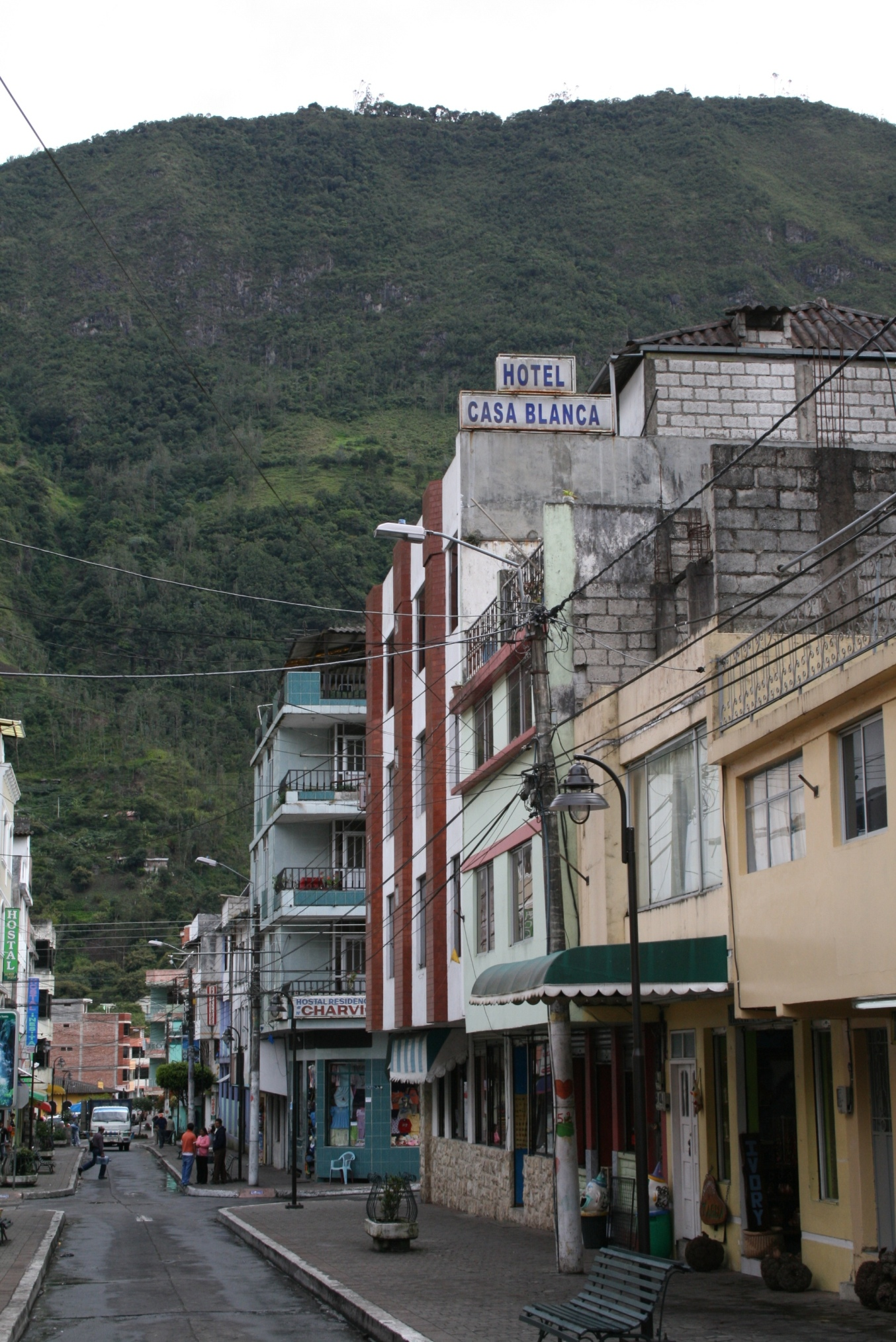
Baños de Agua Santa street

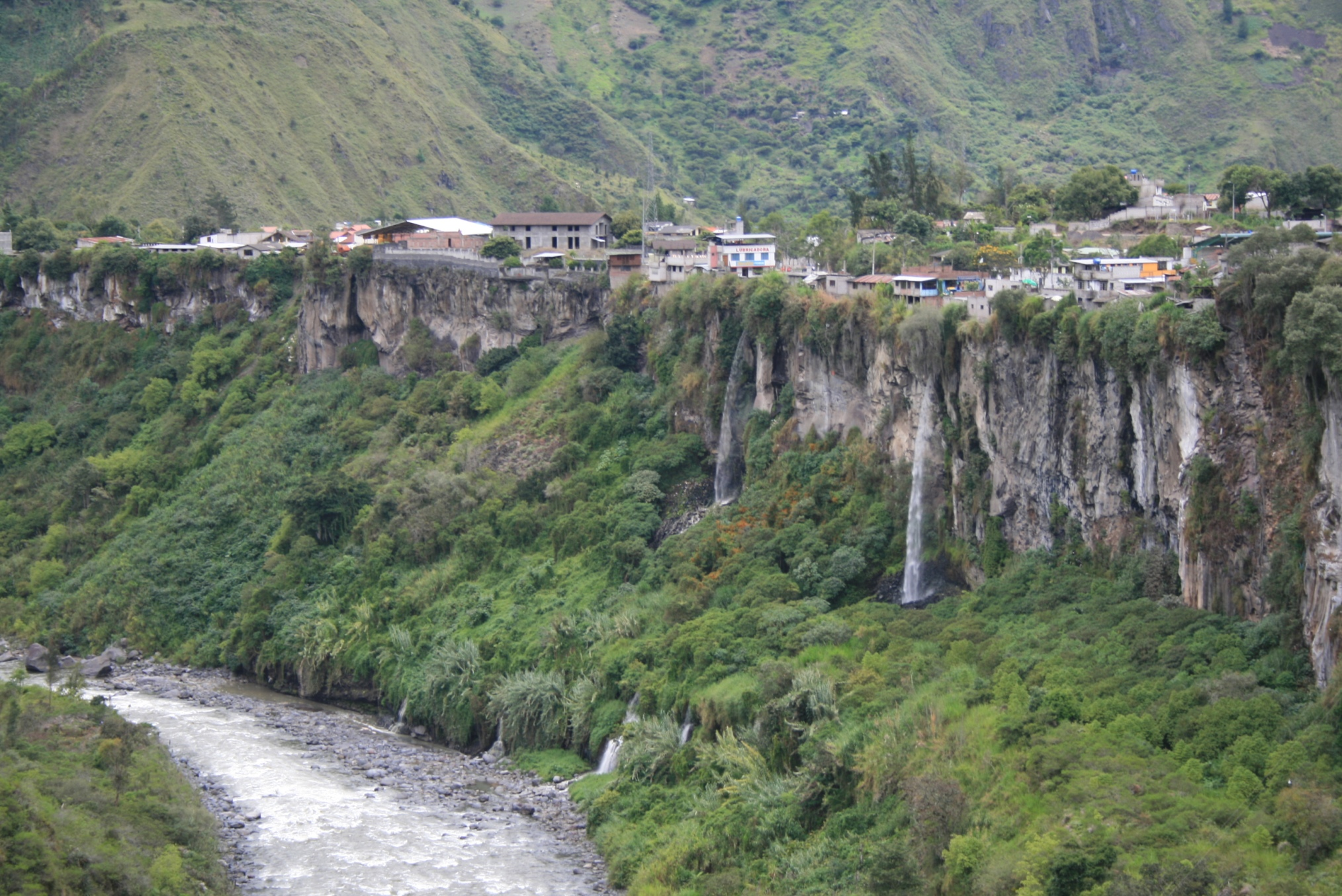
Northside of Baños

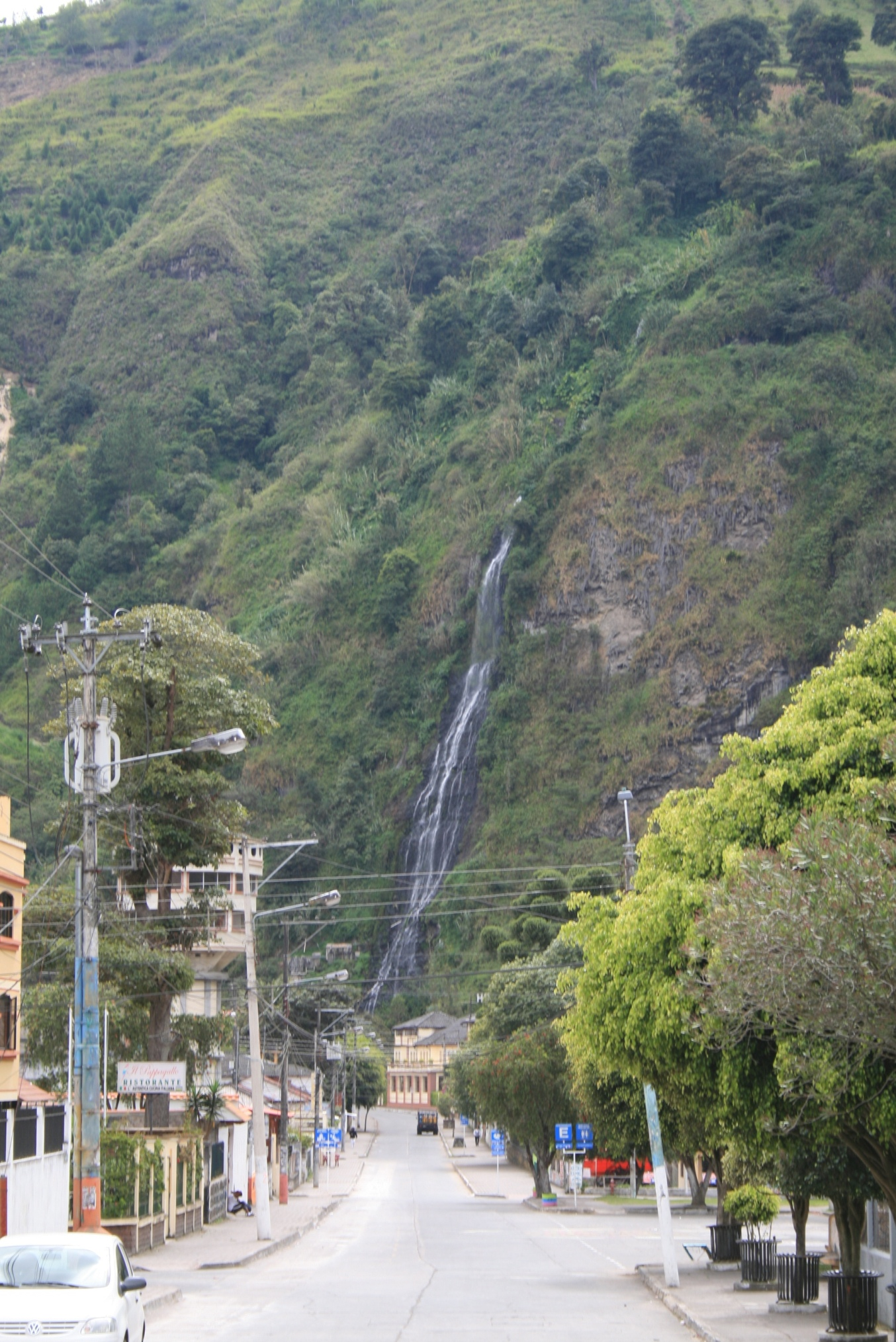
Street in Baños (2009)

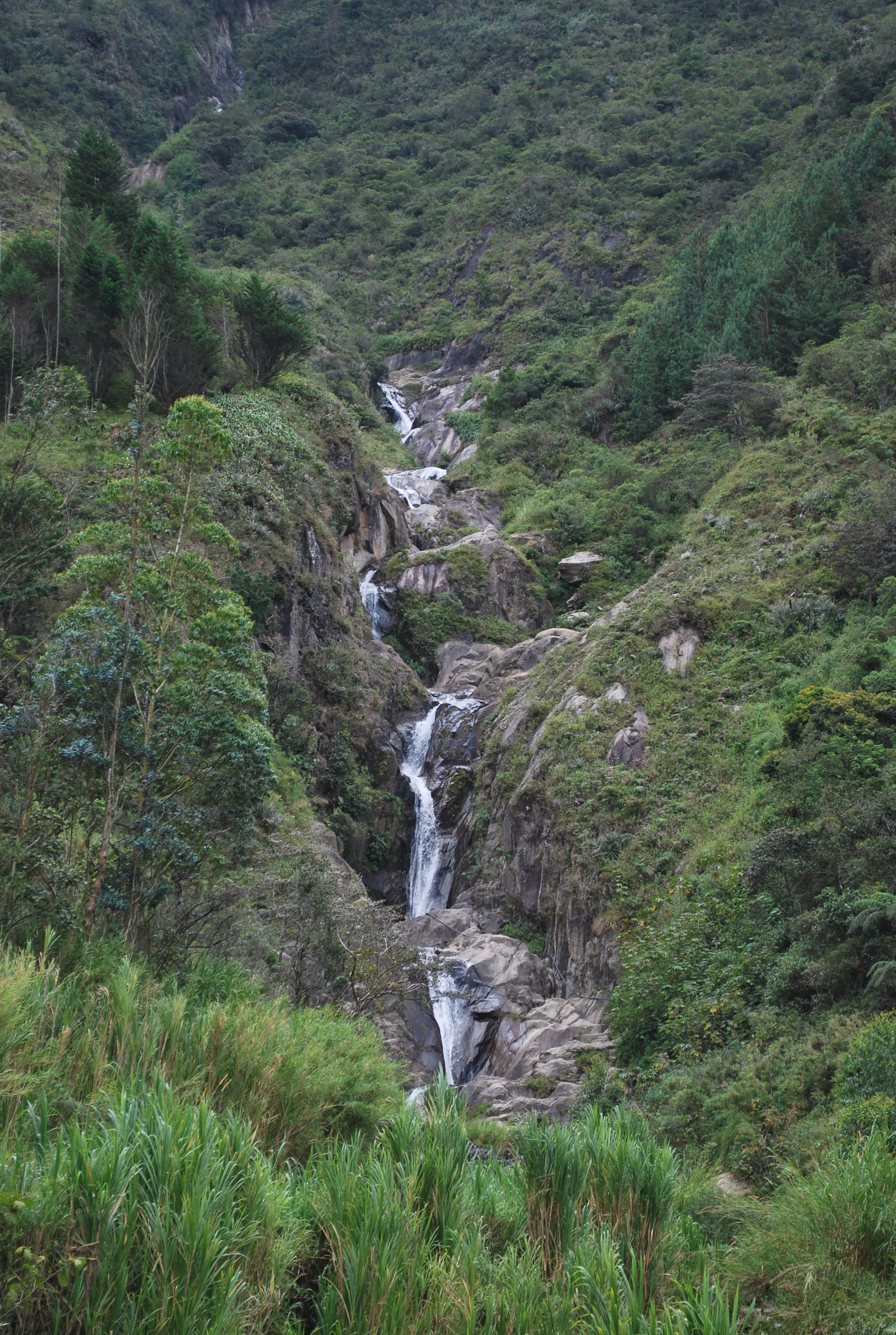
Waterfall in Baños
