= MOCCA =

MOCCA or MoCCA may refer to:

- MoCCA Festival, comics showcase
- Museum of Contemporary Canadian Art, Toronto
- Museum of Comic and Cartoon Art, New York

Mocca may refer to:

- Mocca (band), a jazz and swing band from Indonesia
- Mocca.com, advertiser in Singapore
- "Mocca", a song by Colombian singer Lalo Ebratt
- Mocca Bone, Colombian-Belgian drag queen

== See also ==
- MOCA (disambiguation)
- Moccas, village in Herefordshire
- Mocha (disambiguation)
