= Mocha, Ecuador =

City in the central Andean mountain range of Ecuador

Mocha
- City
- Location within Ecuador
- Coordinates: 1.41879°S 78.66161°W
- Country: Ecuador
- Province: Tungurahua
- Canton: Mocha Canton

Area
  - City: 1.82 km^{2} (0.70 sq mi)

Population (2022 census)
  - City: 1,516
  - Density: 833/km^{2} (2,160/sq mi)

Mocha is a city located in the central Andean mountain range of Ecuador. Located in Tungurahua Province, Mocha is the seat of the Mocha Canton. The current mayor of Mocha is Sr. Orlando Caluña.
