= Pelileo =

- City
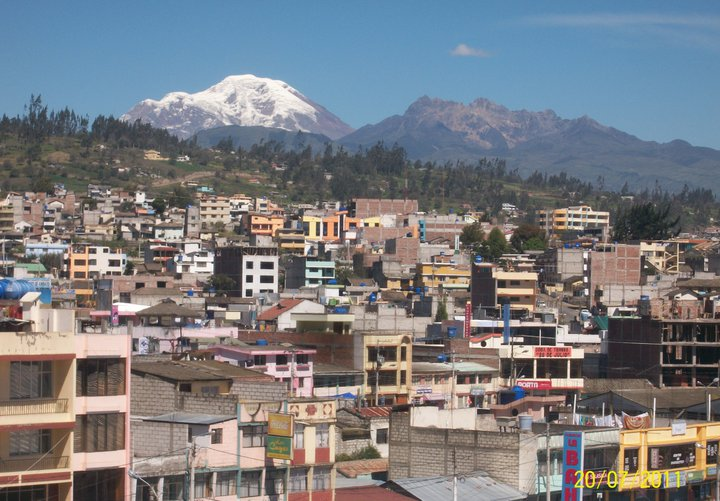
- View of Pelileo with the volcanoes Chimborazo and Carihuairazo in the background

- Location within Ecuador
- Coordinates: 1.33006°S 78.54599°W
- Country: Ecuador
- Province: Tungurahua
- Canton: Pelileo Canton

Area
  - City: 3.43 km^{2} (1.32 sq mi)

Population (2022 census)
  - City: 11,403
  - Density: 3,320/km^{2} (8,610/sq mi)

Pelileo (full form: San Pedro de Pelileo) is a city, with a population of 11,403 (2022 census), located at the center of the Andean region of Ecuador called La Sierra ("the highlands"). It is the seat of Pelileo Canton, with a population of 63,897 (2022 Census), and forms part of Tungurahua Province.

Pelileo is the third largest city in Tungurahua Province behind neighboring Ambato and Baños. It is famous for the production and sale of blue jeans. Many travelers pass through Pelileo on their way from Ambato to Baños.

== History ==
Pelileo was founded by Antonio Clavijo in 1570 and was elevated to the status of county on 22 July 1860.

On 5 August 1949, Pelileo was totally destroyed by an earthquake. Some 5,000 people died within the limits of the county. The only remaining structure still visible from the old city is a broken stone pillar, once part of Pelileo's magnificent main church.

A new city was rebuilt in a nearby location. Currently it is therefore possible to visit both the Great Pelileo (Pelileo Grande), and the New Pelileo (Pelileo Nuevo).

== Economy ==
Pelileo is also known as the Blue City, because of its booming jean industry, mainly located in the El Tambo parish. Another of the parishes of Pelileo is the world-famous Salasaca, home to a Native American tribe originally from Bolivia that came to the Ecuadorian Andes as mitimaes. The Huambalo parish is well known as the home of artisans of fine furniture.

Pelileo is also known for the distillation of a local liquor called aguardiente. A hard, clear sugarcane-based alcohol, it is one of Pelileo's main products outside of blue jeans.

The main market days in Pelileo are Saturday and Tuesday.

== Current events ==
On the morning of 16 August 2006, the Tungurahua volcano exploded, in what appears to be the main event of an eruptive process that started in 1999. On 17 August, the whole of Pelileo woke up covered with rocks and ashes. In all the parishes of the county it is reported that crops have been lost and farm animals are in danger.
