= Mocha Canton =

- Canton
- Tungurahua Province in Ecuador

- Mocha Canton in Tungurahua Province
- Coordinates: 1°25′S 78°40′W
- Country: Ecuador
- Province: Tungurahua Province
- Capital: Mocha

Area
  - Total: 85.14 km^{2} (32.87 sq mi)

Population (2022 census)
  - Total: 7,260
  - Density: 85.3/km^{2} (221/sq mi)
- Time zone: UTC-5 (ECT)

Mocha Canton is a canton of Ecuador, located in the Tungurahua Province. Its capital is the town of Mocha. Its population at the 2001 census was 6,371.
