= Cevallos Canton =

- Canton
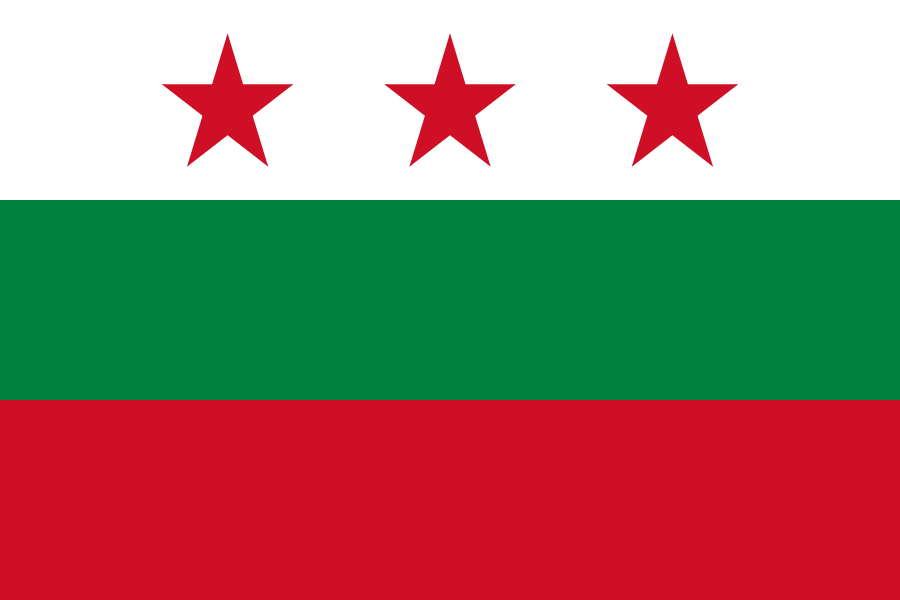
- Flag

- Tungurahua Province in Ecuador

- Cantons of Tungurahua Province
- Coordinates: 01°21′0″S 78°37′0″W
- Country: Ecuador
- Province: Tungurahua Province
- Capital: Cevallos

Area
  - Total: 18.76 km^{2} (7.24 sq mi)

Population (2022 census)
  - Total: 10,433
  - Density: 556.1/km^{2} (1,440/sq mi)
- Time zone: UTC-5 (ECT)

El Cantón Cevallos is a canton of Ecuador, located in the Tungurahua Province. Its capital is the town of Cevallos. Its population at the 2001 census was 6,873.
