= Tungurahua Province =

Smallest Province of Ecuador

Tungurahua
- Province
- Province of Tungurahua
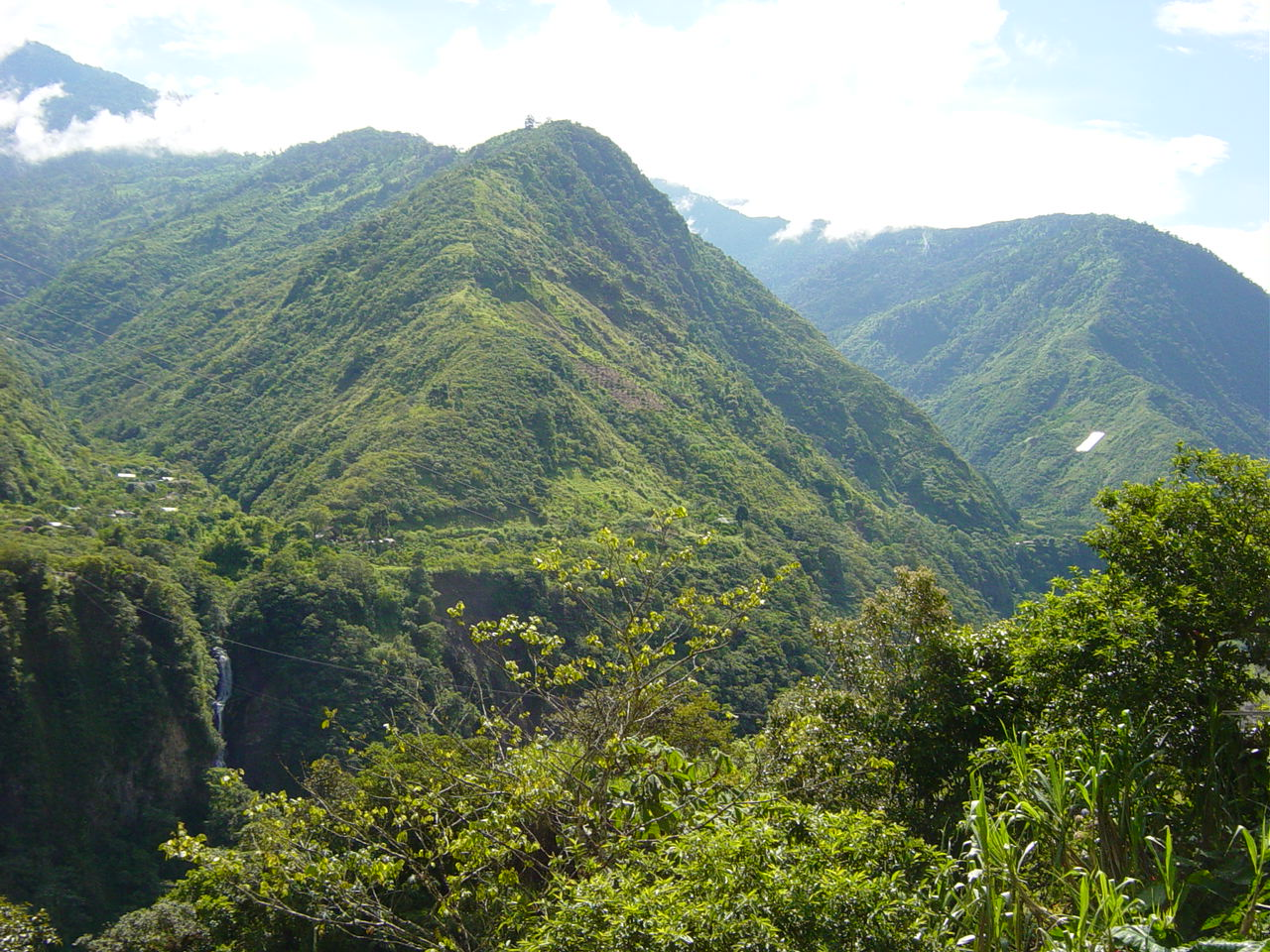
- Landscape near Baños

- Flag

- Tungurahua Province in Ecuador

- Cantons of Tungurahua Province
- Coordinates: 1°14′S 78°37′W
- Country: Ecuador
- Capital: Ambato
- Cantons: List of cantons: Ambato; Baños de Agua Santa; Cevallos; Mocha; Patate; Quero; San Pedro de Pelileo; Santiago de Pillaro; Tisaleo

Government
  - Prefect: Manuel Caizabanda (MUPP)
  - Vice Prefect: Vanessa Lozada
  - Governor: Daniela Llerena Miranda

Area
  - Province: 3,382 km^{2} (1,306 sq mi)
- Elevation: 2,600 m (8,500 ft)
- Highest elevation: 5,016 m (16,457 ft)
- Lowest elevation: 900 m (3,000 ft)

Population (2022 census)
  - Province: 563,532
  - Density: 166.6/km^{2} (431.6/sq mi)
  - Urban: 225,249
- Time zone: UTC-5 (ECT)
- Vehicle registration: T
- HDI (2017): 0.768 high · 4th
- Website: www.tungurahua.gob.ec

Tungurahua (Spanish: Provincia del Tungurahua, literally Province of the Tungurahua; pronounced [tuŋɡuˈɾawa]) is one of the twenty-four provinces of Ecuador. Its capital is Ambato. The province takes its name from the Tungurahua volcano, which is located within the boundaries of the provinces.

== Population ==
In 2011, Tungurahua had an estimated population of 581,389. Ethnic groups as of the Ecuadorian census of 2010:

- Mestizo 82.1%
- Indigenous 12.4%
- White 3.4%
- Afro-Ecuadorian 1.4%
- Montubio 0.5%
- Other 0.1%

== Climate ==
The province has a dry, temperate climate. Like all mountainous areas, the region experiences the phenomenon known as microclimates, in which small portions of the province have drastically different conditions from others due to winds and area pressure.

Generally though, Tungurahua experiences temperatures between 14 and 17 degree Celsius in the day-time, with cooler nights. At higher altitudes, conditions are much colder. Despite the area being near the Equator, mountains such as Carihuayrazo and Chimborazo are covered in snow for much of the year.

== Geography ==
The province is very mountainous, containing the Tungurahua volcano near Baños, as well as bordering the Carihuayrazo and Chimborazo volcanoes to the south. Baños attracts the highest number of tourists. The principal river of the province is the Patate River, which flows to the east toward the Amazon Region.

== Political division ==
The province is divided into nine cantons which stretch from Ambato in the west to Baños in the east. The following table lists each with its population at the 2001 census, its area in square kilometres (km^{2}), and the name of the canton seat or capital.

Canton	Pop. (2011)	Area (km^{2})	Seat/Capital
Ambato	387,282	1,009	Ambato (San Juan de Ambato)
Baños	19,112	1,065	Baños (Baños de Agua Santa)
Cevallos	8,873	19	Cevallos
Mocha	8,371	86	Mocha
Patate	16,771	315	Patate
Pelileo	58,988	202	Pelileo (San Pedro de Pelileo)
Píllaro	44,925	443	Píllaro (Santiago de Píllaro)
Quero	23,187	173	Quero (Santiago de Quero)
Tisaleo	14,525	59	Tisaleo

== Places of interest ==
- Parque de la Familia
- Llanganates National Park

== See also ==
- Provinces of Ecuador
- Cantons of Ecuador
- Pelileo
- Píllaro
