= Transtillaspis =

Scientific classification
- Kingdom: Animalia
- Phylum: Arthropoda
- Clade: Pancrustacea
- Class: Insecta
- Order: Lepidoptera
- Family: Tortricidae
- Tribe: Euliini
- Genus: Transtillaspis; Razowski, 1987

Genus of tortrix moths

Transtillaspis is a genus of moths belonging to the subfamily Tortricinae of the family Tortricidae.

== Species ==
- Transtillaspis alluncus Razowski & Pelz, 2005
- Transtillaspis anxia Razowski & Brown, 2004
- Transtillaspis argentilinea Razowski & Becker, 2002
- Transtillaspis armifera Razowski & Wojtusiak, 2006
- Transtillaspis atheles Razowski & Wojtusiak, 2011
- Transtillaspis atimeta Razowski, 1997
- Transtillaspis baea Razowski, 1987
- Transtillaspis bascanion Razowski, 1987
- Transtillaspis batoidea Razowski, 1987
- Transtillaspis bebela Razowski, 1987
- Transtillaspis blechra Razowski, 1987
- Transtillaspis brachistocera Razowski, 1987
- Transtillaspis brandinojuxta Razowski, 1987
- Transtillaspis calderana Razowski & Wojtusiak, 2008
- Transtillaspis cherada Razowski & Becker, 2001
- Transtillaspis chilesana Razowski & Wojtusiak, 2008
- Transtillaspis chiribogana Razowski & Wojtusiak, 2008
- Transtillaspis cholojuxta Razowski & Wojtusiak, 2010
- Transtillaspis cinifera Razowski & Brown, 2004
- Transtillaspis cornutipea Razowski, 1997
- Transtillaspis cosangana Razowski & Wojtusiak, 2009
- Transtillaspis costipuncta Razowski & Wojtusiak, 2009
- Transtillaspis cothurnata Razowski & Pelz, 2005
- Transtillaspis cracens Razowski & Pelz, 2005
- Transtillaspis crepera Razowski & Pelz, 2005
- Transtillaspis curiosissima Razowski & Wojtusiak, 2008
- Transtillaspis dromadaria Razowski & Wojtusiak, 2008
- Transtillaspis emblema Razowski & Pelz, 2005
- Transtillaspis empheria Razowski & Pelz, 2005
- Transtillaspis ependyma Razowski & Pelz, 2005
- Transtillaspis galbana Razowski & Pelz, 2005
- Transtillaspis golondrinana Razowski & Wojtusiak, 2008
- Transtillaspis hedychnium Razowski, 1991
- Transtillaspis hepaticolorana Razowski & Wojtusiak, 2008
- Transtillaspis herospina Razowski & Pelz, 2005
- Transtillaspis irrorata Razowski & Pelz, 2003
- Transtillaspis juxtarmata Razowski & Wojtusiak, 2010
- Transtillaspis juxtonca Razowski & Pelz, 2005
- Transtillaspis longisetae Razowski & Wojtusiak, 2008
- Transtillaspis luiscarlosi Razowski & Pelz, 2003
- Transtillaspis lypra Razowski & Pelz, 2005
- Transtillaspis mecosacculus Razowski & Pelz, 2005
- Transtillaspis mindoana Razowski & Pelz, 2005
- Transtillaspis monoloba Razowski & Wojtusiak, 2010
- Transtillaspis monoseta Razowski & Pelz, 2003
- Transtillaspis multicornuta Razowski & Wojtusiak, 2008
- Transtillaspis multisetae Razowski & Pelz, 2003
- Transtillaspis nedyma Razowski & Pelz, 2005
- Transtillaspis neelys Razowski & Pelz, 2005
- Transtillaspis obvoluta Razowski & Wojtusiak, 2010
- Transtillaspis papallactana Razowski & Wojtusiak, 2009
- Transtillaspis parallela Razowski & Wojtusiak, 2010
- Transtillaspis parummaculatum Razowski & Pelz, 2005
- Transtillaspis pichinchana Razowski & Wojtusiak, 2008
- Transtillaspis plagifascia Razowski & Pelz, 2005
- Transtillaspis protungurahuana Razowski & Wojtusiak, 2010
- Transtillaspis quatrocornuta Razowski & Wojtusiak, 2008
- Transtillaspis rioverdensis Razowski & Pelz, 2005
- Transtillaspis saragurana Razowski & Wojtusiak, 2008
- Transtillaspis scyruncus Razowski & Wojtusiak, 2013
- Transtillaspis sequax Razowski & Wojtusiak, 2013
- Transtillaspis setata Razowski & Wojtusiak, 2013
- Transtillaspis stiphra Razowski & Wojtusiak, 2013
- Transtillaspis tucumana Razowski & Brown, 2004
- Transtillaspis tungurahuana Razowski & Pelz, 2005
- Transtillaspis zamorana Razowski & Wojtusiak, 2008
- Transtillaspis zenenaltana Razowski & Wojtusiak, 2008
- Transtillaspis zonion Razowski & Becker, 2001

== See also ==
- List of Tortricidae genera
