= Transtillaspis obvoluta =

Scientific classification
- Domain: Eukaryota
- Kingdom: Animalia
- Phylum: Arthropoda
- Class: Insecta
- Order: Lepidoptera
- Family: Tortricidae
- Genus: Transtillaspis
- Species: T. obvoluta

Binomial name
- Transtillaspis obvoluta Razowski & Wojtusiak, 2010

Species of moth

Transtillaspis obvoluta is a species of moth of the family Tortricidae. It is found in Peru.

The wingspan is about 25 mm.
