= Transtillaspis nedyma =

Scientific classification
- Kingdom: Animalia
- Phylum: Arthropoda
- Class: Insecta
- Order: Lepidoptera
- Family: Tortricidae
- Genus: Transtillaspis
- Species: T. nedyma

Binomial name
- Transtillaspis nedyma Razowski & Pelz, 2005

Species of moth

Transtillaspis nedyma is a species of moth of the family Tortricidae. It is found in Ecuador in Napo and Zamora-Chinchipe provinces.

The wingspan is 19–20.5 mm.
