= Clarkeulia egena =

Scientific classification
- Kingdom: Animalia
- Phylum: Arthropoda
- Clade: Pancrustacea
- Class: Insecta
- Order: Lepidoptera
- Family: Tortricidae
- Genus: Clarkeulia
- Species: C. egena

Binomial name
- Clarkeulia egena Razowski & Becker, 1984

Species of moth

Clarkeulia egena is a species of moth of the family Tortricidae. It is found in Paraná, Brazil.
