= Clarkeulia craterosema =

Scientific classification
- Kingdom: Animalia
- Phylum: Arthropoda
- Class: Insecta
- Order: Lepidoptera
- Family: Tortricidae
- Genus: Clarkeulia
- Species: C. craterosema

Binomial name
- Clarkeulia craterosema (Meyrick, 1912)

Synonyms
- Eulia craterosema Meyrick, 1912

Species of moth

Clarkeulia craterosema is a species of moth of the family Tortricidae. It is found in São Paulo, Brazil.
