= Transtillaspis hepaticolorana =

Scientific classification
- Domain: Eukaryota
- Kingdom: Animalia
- Phylum: Arthropoda
- Class: Insecta
- Order: Lepidoptera
- Family: Tortricidae
- Genus: Transtillaspis
- Species: T. hepaticolorana

Binomial name
- Transtillaspis hepaticolorana Razowski & Wojtusiak, 2008

Species of moth

Transtillaspis hepaticolorana is a species of moth of the family Tortricidae. It is found in Carchi Province, Ecuador.

The wingspan is about 24 mm.

== Etymology ==
The species is derived Greek/Latin hepar (meaning liver).
