= Transtillaspis saragurana =

Scientific classification
- Domain: Eukaryota
- Kingdom: Animalia
- Phylum: Arthropoda
- Class: Insecta
- Order: Lepidoptera
- Family: Tortricidae
- Genus: Transtillaspis
- Species: T. saragurana

Binomial name
- Transtillaspis saragurana Razowski & Wojtusiak, 2008

Species of moth

Transtillaspis saragurana is a species of moth of the family Tortricidae. It is found in Loja Province, Ecuador.

The wingspan is about 23 mm.

== Etymology ==
The species name refers to Saraguro, the type locality.
