= Transtillaspis neelys =

Scientific classification
- Kingdom: Animalia
- Phylum: Arthropoda
- Class: Insecta
- Order: Lepidoptera
- Family: Tortricidae
- Genus: Transtillaspis
- Species: T. neelys

Binomial name
- Transtillaspis neelys Razowski & Pelz, 2005

Species of moth

Transtillaspis neelys is a species of moth of the family Tortricidae. It is found in Ecuador in Napo and Tungurahua provinces.

The wingspan is 18.5 mm.

== Etymology ==
The species name refers to the late recognition of the species and is derived from Latin neelys (meaning lately arrived).
