= Transtillaspis emblema =

Scientific classification
- Kingdom: Animalia
- Phylum: Arthropoda
- Class: Insecta
- Order: Lepidoptera
- Family: Tortricidae
- Genus: Transtillaspis
- Species: T. emblema

Binomial name
- Transtillaspis emblema Razowski & Pelz, 2005

Species of moth

Transtillaspis emblema is a species of moth of the family Tortricidae. It is found in Napo Province, Ecuador.

The wingspan is 13.5–15 mm for males and 14–16 mm for females.
