= Transtillaspis rioverdensis =

Scientific classification
- Kingdom: Animalia
- Phylum: Arthropoda
- Class: Insecta
- Order: Lepidoptera
- Family: Tortricidae
- Genus: Transtillaspis
- Species: T. rioverdensis

Binomial name
- Transtillaspis rioverdensis Razowski & Pelz, 2005

Species of moth

Transtillaspis rioverdensis is a species of moth of the family Tortricidae. It is found in Tungurahua Province, Ecuador.

The wingspan is 14 mm.

== Etymology ==
The species name refers to Rio Verde, the type locality.
