= Transtillaspis mindoana =

Scientific classification
- Kingdom: Animalia
- Phylum: Arthropoda
- Class: Insecta
- Order: Lepidoptera
- Family: Tortricidae
- Genus: Transtillaspis
- Species: T. mindoana

Binomial name
- Transtillaspis mindoana Razowski & Pelz, 2005

Species of moth

Transtillaspis mindoana is a species of moth of the family Tortricidae. It is found in Pichincha Province, Ecuador.

The wingspan is 15–16 mm for males and 18 mm for females.
