= Clarkeulia mitigata =

Scientific classification
- Domain: Eukaryota
- Kingdom: Animalia
- Phylum: Arthropoda
- Class: Insecta
- Order: Lepidoptera
- Family: Tortricidae
- Genus: Clarkeulia
- Species: C. mitigata

Binomial name
- Clarkeulia mitigata Razowski, 1997

Species of moth

Clarkeulia mitigata is a species of moth of the family Tortricidae. It is found in Peru.
