= Transtillaspis scyruncus =

Scientific classification
- Domain: Eukaryota
- Kingdom: Animalia
- Phylum: Arthropoda
- Class: Insecta
- Order: Lepidoptera
- Family: Tortricidae
- Genus: Transtillaspis
- Species: T. scyruncus

Binomial name
- Transtillaspis scyruncus Razowski & Wojtusiak, 2013

Species of moth

Transtillaspis scyruncus is a species of moth of the family Tortricidae. It is found in Morona-Santiago Province, Ecuador.

The wingspan is 24 mm.
