= Transtillaspis plagifascia =

Scientific classification
- Kingdom: Animalia
- Phylum: Arthropoda
- Class: Insecta
- Order: Lepidoptera
- Family: Tortricidae
- Genus: Transtillaspis
- Species: T. plagifascia

Binomial name
- Transtillaspis plagifascia Razowski & Pelz, 2005

Species of moth

Transtillaspis plagifascia is a species of moth of the family Tortricidae. It is found in Ecuador in Tungurahua, Azuay and Loja provinces.

The wingspan is 14.5–18 mm for males and 17-23.5 mm for females.

== Etymology ==
The species name refers to the forewing markings and is derived from Greek plagios (meaning oblique) and Latin fascia (meaning fascia).
