= Clarkeulia dimorpha =

Scientific classification
- Domain: Eukaryota
- Kingdom: Animalia
- Phylum: Arthropoda
- Class: Insecta
- Order: Lepidoptera
- Family: Tortricidae
- Genus: Clarkeulia
- Species: C. dimorpha

Binomial name
- Clarkeulia dimorpha (Clarke, 1949)

Synonyms
- Eulia dimorpha Clarke, 1949

Species of moth

Clarkeulia dimorpha is a species of moth of the family Tortricidae. It is found in Santa Catarina, Brazil.
