= Transtillaspis batoidea =

Scientific classification
- Domain: Eukaryota
- Kingdom: Animalia
- Phylum: Arthropoda
- Class: Insecta
- Order: Lepidoptera
- Family: Tortricidae
- Genus: Transtillaspis
- Species: T. batoidea

Binomial name
- Transtillaspis batoidea Razowski, 1987

Species of moth

Transtillaspis batoidea is a species of moth of the family Tortricidae. It is found in Peru.
