= Transtillaspis zonion =

Scientific classification
- Kingdom: Animalia
- Phylum: Arthropoda
- Clade: Pancrustacea
- Class: Insecta
- Order: Lepidoptera
- Family: Tortricidae
- Genus: Transtillaspis
- Species: T. zonion

Binomial name
- Transtillaspis zonion Razowski & Becker, 2001

Species of moth

Transtillaspis zonion is a species of moth of the family Tortricidae. It is found in Rio de Janeiro, Brazil.
