= Clarkeulia hamata =

Scientific classification
- Domain: Eukaryota
- Kingdom: Animalia
- Phylum: Arthropoda
- Class: Insecta
- Order: Lepidoptera
- Family: Tortricidae
- Genus: Clarkeulia
- Species: C. hamata

Binomial name
- Clarkeulia hamata Razowski & Wojtusiak, 2010

Species of moth

Clarkeulia hamata is a species of moth of the family Tortricidae. It is found in Peru.

The wingspan is 19–21 mm.
