= Transtillaspis ependyma =

Scientific classification
- Kingdom: Animalia
- Phylum: Arthropoda
- Class: Insecta
- Order: Lepidoptera
- Family: Tortricidae
- Genus: Transtillaspis
- Species: T. ependyma

Binomial name
- Transtillaspis ependyma Razowski & Pelz, 2005

Species of moth

Transtillaspis ependyma is a species of moth of the family Tortricidae. It is found in Ecuador (Loja Province) and Peru.

The wingspan is 17 mm.
