= Transtillaspis galbana =

Scientific classification
- Kingdom: Animalia
- Phylum: Arthropoda
- Class: Insecta
- Order: Lepidoptera
- Family: Tortricidae
- Genus: Transtillaspis
- Species: T. galbana

Binomial name
- Transtillaspis galbana Razowski & Pelz, 2005

Species of moth

Transtillaspis galbana is a species of moth of the family Tortricidae. It is found in Ecuador in Napo, Morona-Santiago, Zamora-Chinchipe, Carchi and Sucumbios provinces.

The wingspan is 18–21 mm.
