= Clarkeulia medanosa =

Scientific classification
- Kingdom: Animalia
- Phylum: Arthropoda
- Class: Insecta
- Order: Lepidoptera
- Family: Tortricidae
- Genus: Clarkeulia
- Species: C. medanosa

Binomial name
- Clarkeulia medanosa Razowski & Pelz, 2007

Species of moth

Clarkeulia medanosa is a species of moth of the family Tortricidae. It is found in Argentina.

The wingspan is 17–19 mm.

== Etymology ==
The species name refers to the name of the type locality, Salta Los Medanos.
