= Transtillaspis tucumana =

Scientific classification
- Domain: Eukaryota
- Kingdom: Animalia
- Phylum: Arthropoda
- Class: Insecta
- Order: Lepidoptera
- Family: Tortricidae
- Genus: Transtillaspis
- Species: T. tucumana

Binomial name
- Transtillaspis tucumana Razowski & Brown, 2004

Species of moth

Transtillaspis tucumana is a species of moth of the family Tortricidae. It is found in Tucumán Province, Argentina.

The length of the forewings is 8.2 mm for males and 10.5 mm for females.
