= Transtillaspis protungurahuana =

Scientific classification
- Domain: Eukaryota
- Kingdom: Animalia
- Phylum: Arthropoda
- Class: Insecta
- Order: Lepidoptera
- Family: Tortricidae
- Genus: Transtillaspis
- Species: T. protungurahuana

Binomial name
- Transtillaspis protungurahuana Razowski & Wojtusiak, 2010

Synonyms
- Transtillaspis tungurahuana Razowski & Wojtusiak, 2009 (preocc.)

Species of moth

Transtillaspis protungurahuana is a species of moth of the family Tortricidae. It is found in Tungurahua Province, Ecuador.

The wingspan is about 18 mm (0.71 in).

== Etymology ==
The species name refers to the province of Tungurahua.
