= Transtillaspis irrorata =

Scientific classification
- Kingdom: Animalia
- Phylum: Arthropoda
- Class: Insecta
- Order: Lepidoptera
- Family: Tortricidae
- Genus: Transtillaspis
- Species: T. irrorata

Binomial name
- Transtillaspis irrorata Razowski & Pelz, 2003

Species of moth

Transtillaspis irrorata is a species of moth of the family Tortricidae. It is found in Ecuador in Morona-Santiago and Tungurahua provinces.

The wingspan is 14 mm.
