= Transtillaspis cholojuxta =

Scientific classification
- Domain: Eukaryota
- Kingdom: Animalia
- Phylum: Arthropoda
- Class: Insecta
- Order: Lepidoptera
- Family: Tortricidae
- Genus: Transtillaspis
- Species: T. cholojuxta

Binomial name
- Transtillaspis cholojuxta Razowski & Wojtusiak, 2010

Species of moth

Transtillaspis cholojuxta is a species of moth of the family Tortricidae. It is found in Peru.

The wingspan is about 20 mm.

== Etymology ==
The species name refers to the unequal processes of the juxta and is derived from Greek cholos (meaning lame).
