= Transtillaspis cinifera =

Scientific classification
- Domain: Eukaryota
- Kingdom: Animalia
- Phylum: Arthropoda
- Class: Insecta
- Order: Lepidoptera
- Family: Tortricidae
- Genus: Transtillaspis
- Species: T. cinifera

Binomial name
- Transtillaspis cinifera Razowski & Brown, 2004

Species of moth

Transtillaspis cinifera is a species of moth of the family Tortricidae. It is found in Venezuela.

The length of the forewings is 9.5-10.5 mm.
