= Transtillaspis lypra =

Scientific classification
- Kingdom: Animalia
- Phylum: Arthropoda
- Class: Insecta
- Order: Lepidoptera
- Family: Tortricidae
- Genus: Transtillaspis
- Species: T. lypra

Binomial name
- Transtillaspis lypra Razowski & Pelz, 2005

Species of moth

Transtillaspis lypra is a species of moth of the family Tortricidae. It is found in Napo Province, Ecuador.

The wingspan is 14.5 mm.
