= Transtillaspis monoseta =

Scientific classification
- Kingdom: Animalia
- Phylum: Arthropoda
- Class: Insecta
- Order: Lepidoptera
- Family: Tortricidae
- Genus: Transtillaspis
- Species: T. monoseta

Binomial name
- Transtillaspis monoseta Razowski & Pelz, 2003

Species of moth

Transtillaspis monoseta is a species of moth of the family Tortricidae. It is found in Morona-Santiago Province, Ecuador.
