= Clarkeulia ardalio =

Scientific classification
- Kingdom: Animalia
- Phylum: Arthropoda
- Clade: Pancrustacea
- Class: Insecta
- Order: Lepidoptera
- Family: Tortricidae
- Genus: Clarkeulia
- Species: C. ardalio

Binomial name
- Clarkeulia ardalio Razowski & Becker, 1984

Species of moth

Clarkeulia ardalio is a species of moth of the family Tortricidae. It is found in Brazil (Parana).
