= Transtillaspis luiscarlosi =

Scientific classification
- Kingdom: Animalia
- Phylum: Arthropoda
- Class: Insecta
- Order: Lepidoptera
- Family: Tortricidae
- Genus: Transtillaspis
- Species: T. luiscarlosi

Binomial name
- Transtillaspis luiscarlosi Razowski & Pelz, 2003

Species of moth

Transtillaspis luiscarlosi is a species of moth of the family Tortricidae. It is found in Morona-Santiago Province, Ecuador.
