= Transtillaspis argentilinea =

Scientific classification
- Kingdom: Animalia
- Phylum: Arthropoda
- Clade: Pancrustacea
- Class: Insecta
- Order: Lepidoptera
- Family: Tortricidae
- Genus: Transtillaspis
- Species: T. argentilinea

Binomial name
- Transtillaspis argentilinea Razowski & Becker, 2002

Synonyms
- Gorytvesica argentilinea

Species of moth

Transtillaspis argentilinea is a species of moth of the family Tortricidae. It is endemic to Ecuador (Morona-Santiago Province).
