= Transtillaspis hedychnium =

Scientific classification
- Domain: Eukaryota
- Kingdom: Animalia
- Phylum: Arthropoda
- Class: Insecta
- Order: Lepidoptera
- Family: Tortricidae
- Genus: Transtillaspis
- Species: T. hedychnium

Binomial name
- Transtillaspis hedychnium Razowski, 1991

Species of moth

Transtillaspis hedychnium is a species of moth of the family Tortricidae. It is found in Venezuela.
