= Transtillaspis zamorana =

Scientific classification
- Domain: Eukaryota
- Kingdom: Animalia
- Phylum: Arthropoda
- Class: Insecta
- Order: Lepidoptera
- Family: Tortricidae
- Genus: Transtillaspis
- Species: T. zamorana

Binomial name
- Transtillaspis zamorana Razowski & Wojtusiak, 2008

Species of moth

Transtillaspis zamorana is a species of moth of the family Tortricidae. It is found in Loja Province, Ecuador.

The wingspan is about 18 mm for males and 22 mm for females.

== Etymology ==
The species name refers to the name of the Zamora-Chinchipe Province in Ecuador, although the Loja Province is given as the type location.
