= Clarkeulia semigrapha =

Scientific classification
- Domain: Eukaryota
- Kingdom: Animalia
- Phylum: Arthropoda
- Class: Insecta
- Order: Lepidoptera
- Family: Tortricidae
- Genus: Clarkeulia
- Species: C. semigrapha

Binomial name
- Clarkeulia semigrapha (Razowski, 1982)

Synonyms
- Deltinea semigrapha Razowski, 1982

Species of moth

Clarkeulia semigrapha is a species of moth of the family Tortricidae. It is found in Paraná, Brazil.
