= Clarkeulia magnana =

Scientific classification
- Domain: Eukaryota
- Kingdom: Animalia
- Phylum: Arthropoda
- Class: Insecta
- Order: Lepidoptera
- Family: Tortricidae
- Genus: Clarkeulia
- Species: C. magnana

Binomial name
- Clarkeulia magnana Razowski & Wojtusiak, 2009

Species of moth

Clarkeulia magnana is a species of moth of the family Tortricidae. It is found in Napo Province, Ecuador.

The wingspan is 38.5 mm.
