= Clarkeulia sellata =

Scientific classification
- Domain: Eukaryota
- Kingdom: Animalia
- Phylum: Arthropoda
- Class: Insecta
- Order: Lepidoptera
- Family: Tortricidae
- Genus: Clarkeulia
- Species: C. sellata

Binomial name
- Clarkeulia sellata (Razowski, 1982)

Synonyms
- Deltinea sellata Razowski, 1982

Species of moth

Clarkeulia sellata is a species of moth of the family Tortricidae. It is found in Santa Catarina, Brazil.
