= Transtillaspis anxia =

Scientific classification
- Domain: Eukaryota
- Kingdom: Animalia
- Phylum: Arthropoda
- Class: Insecta
- Order: Lepidoptera
- Family: Tortricidae
- Genus: Transtillaspis
- Species: T. anxia

Binomial name
- Transtillaspis anxia Razowski & Brown, 2004

Species of moth

Transtillaspis anxia is a species of moth of the family Tortricidae. It is found in Colombia.

The length of the forewings is 11 mm.
