= Transtillaspis sequax =

Scientific classification
- Domain: Eukaryota
- Kingdom: Animalia
- Phylum: Arthropoda
- Class: Insecta
- Order: Lepidoptera
- Family: Tortricidae
- Genus: Transtillaspis
- Species: T. sequax

Binomial name
- Transtillaspis sequax Razowski & Wojtusiak, 2013

Species of moth

Transtillaspis sequax is a species of moth of the family Tortricidae. It is found in Peru.

The wingspan is 17 mm.
