= Transtillaspis monoloba =

Scientific classification
- Domain: Eukaryota
- Kingdom: Animalia
- Phylum: Arthropoda
- Class: Insecta
- Order: Lepidoptera
- Family: Tortricidae
- Genus: Transtillaspis
- Species: T. monoloba

Binomial name
- Transtillaspis monoloba Razowski & Wojtusiak, 2010

Species of moth

Transtillaspis monoloba is a species of moth of the family Tortricidae. It is found in Peru.

The wingspan is about 19 mm.
