= Transtillaspis brachistocera =

Scientific classification
- Domain: Eukaryota
- Kingdom: Animalia
- Phylum: Arthropoda
- Class: Insecta
- Order: Lepidoptera
- Family: Tortricidae
- Genus: Transtillaspis
- Species: T. brachistocera

Binomial name
- Transtillaspis brachistocera Razowski, 1987

Species of insect

Transtillaspis brachistocera is a species of moth of the family Tortricidae. It is found in Colombia.
