= Transtillaspis chiribogana =

Scientific classification
- Domain: Eukaryota
- Kingdom: Animalia
- Phylum: Arthropoda
- Class: Insecta
- Order: Lepidoptera
- Family: Tortricidae
- Genus: Transtillaspis
- Species: T. chiribogana

Binomial name
- Transtillaspis chiribogana Razowski & Wojtusiak, 2008

Species of moth

Transtillaspis chiribogana is a species of moth of the family Tortricidae. It is found in the Pichincha Province of Ecuador.

Its wingspan is about 20 mm.
