= Transtillaspis quatrocornuta =

Scientific classification
- Domain: Eukaryota
- Kingdom: Animalia
- Phylum: Arthropoda
- Class: Insecta
- Order: Lepidoptera
- Family: Tortricidae
- Genus: Transtillaspis
- Species: T. quatrocornuta

Binomial name
- Transtillaspis quatrocornuta Razowski & Wojtusiak, 2008

Species of moth

Transtillaspis quatrocornuta is a species of moth of the family Tortricidae. It is found in Pichincha Province, Ecuador.

The wingspan is about 15 mm.

== Etymology ==
The species name refers to the presence of four cornuti.
