= Clarkeulia exstinctrix =

Scientific classification
- Kingdom: Animalia
- Phylum: Arthropoda
- Class: Insecta
- Order: Lepidoptera
- Family: Tortricidae
- Genus: Clarkeulia
- Species: C. exstinctrix

Binomial name
- Clarkeulia exstinctrix (Meyrick, 1931)

Synonyms
- Eulia exstinctrix Meyrick, 1931

Species of moth

Clarkeulia exstinctrix is a species of moth of the family Tortricidae. It is found in São Paulo, Brazil.
