= Transtillaspis setata =

Scientific classification
- Domain: Eukaryota
- Kingdom: Animalia
- Phylum: Arthropoda
- Class: Insecta
- Order: Lepidoptera
- Family: Tortricidae
- Genus: Transtillaspis
- Species: T. setata

Binomial name
- Transtillaspis setata Razowski & Wojtusiak, 2013

Species of moth

Transtillaspis setata is a species of moth of the family Tortricidae. It is found in Venezuela.

The wingspan is 15 mm.
