= Clarkeulia mulsa =

Scientific classification
- Kingdom: Animalia
- Phylum: Arthropoda
- Clade: Pancrustacea
- Class: Insecta
- Order: Lepidoptera
- Family: Tortricidae
- Genus: Clarkeulia
- Species: C. mulsa

Binomial name
- Clarkeulia mulsa Razowski & Becker, 1984

Species of moth

Clarkeulia mulsa is a species of moth of the family Tortricidae. It is found in Minas Gerais, Brazil.
