= Clarkeulia =

Scientific classification
- Kingdom: Animalia
- Phylum: Arthropoda
- Class: Insecta
- Order: Lepidoptera
- Family: Tortricidae
- Tribe: Euliini
- Genus: Clarkeulia; Razowski, 1982

Genus of tortrix moths

Clarkeulia is a genus of moths belonging to the family Tortricidae.

== Species ==
- Clarkeulia aerumnosa Razowski & Becker, 1984
- Clarkeulia ardalio Razowski & Becker, 1984
- Clarkeulia aulon Razowski & Becker, 1984
- Clarkeulia bourquini (Clarke, 1949)
- Clarkeulia conistra Razowski & Becker, 1984
- Clarkeulia craterosema (Meyrick, 1912)
- Clarkeulia deceptiva (Clarke, 1949)
- Clarkeulia dimorpha (Clarke, 1949)
- Clarkeulia dubia Razowski & Becker, 1984
- Clarkeulia egena Razowski & Becker, 1984
- Clarkeulia epistica (Clarke, 1949)
- Clarkeulia excerptana (Walker, 1963)
- Clarkeulia expedita Razowski & Becker, 1984
- Clarkeulia exstinctrix (Meyrick, 1931)
- Clarkeulia fortuita Razowski & Becker, 1984
- Clarkeulia hamata Razowski & Wojtusiak, 2010
- Clarkeulia lacrimosa Razowski & Becker, 1984
- Clarkeulia licea Razowski & Becker, 1984
- Clarkeulia magnana Razowski & Wojtusiak, 2009
- Clarkeulia medanosa Razowski & Pelz, 2007
- Clarkeulia mediana Razowski & Becker, 1984
- Clarkeulia mitigata Razowski, 1997
- Clarkeulia mulsa Razowski & Becker, 1984
- Clarkeulia neoclyta Razowski, 1988
- Clarkeulia oreographa (Meyrick, 1909)
- Clarkeulia perversa Razowski & Becker, 1984
- Clarkeulia placabilis Razowski & Becker, 1984
- Clarkeulia radicana (Zeller, 1877)
- Clarkeulia sellata (Razowski, 1982)
- Clarkeulia semanota (Razowski, 1982)
- Clarkeulia sematica (Razowski, 1982)
- Clarkeulia semigrapha (Razowski, 1982)
- Clarkeulia separabilis (Razowski, 1982)
- Clarkeulia sepiaria (Razowski, 1982)
- Clarkeulia seposita (Razowski, 1982)
- Clarkeulia simera (Razowski, 1982)
- Clarkeulia sonae (Clarke, 1949)
- Clarkeulia spadix (Razowski, 1982)
- Clarkeulia spectanda (Razowski, 1982)
- Clarkeulia umbrifera Razowski & Becker, 1984
- Clarkeulia virga (Clarke, 1949)

== See also ==
- List of Tortricidae genera
