= Transtillaspis bascanion =

Scientific classification
- Domain: Eukaryota
- Kingdom: Animalia
- Phylum: Arthropoda
- Class: Insecta
- Order: Lepidoptera
- Family: Tortricidae
- Genus: Transtillaspis
- Species: T. bascanion

Binomial name
- Transtillaspis bascanion Razowski, 1987

Species of moth

Transtillaspis bascanion is a species of moth of the family Tortricidae. It is found in Peru.
