= Transtillaspis multicornuta =

Scientific classification
- Domain: Eukaryota
- Kingdom: Animalia
- Phylum: Arthropoda
- Class: Insecta
- Order: Lepidoptera
- Family: Tortricidae
- Genus: Transtillaspis
- Species: T. multicornuta

Binomial name
- Transtillaspis multicornuta Razowski & Wojtusiak, 2008

Species of moth

Transtillaspis multicornuta is a species of moth of the family Tortricidae. It is found in Ecuador in Carchi and Napo provinces.

The wingspan is about 19 mm.
