= Clarkeulia oreographa =

Scientific classification
- Kingdom: Animalia
- Phylum: Arthropoda
- Class: Insecta
- Order: Lepidoptera
- Family: Tortricidae
- Genus: Clarkeulia
- Species: C. oreographa

Binomial name
- Clarkeulia oreographa (Meyrick, 1909)

Synonyms
- Tortrix oreographa Meyrick, 1909

Species of moth

Clarkeulia oreographa is a species of moth of the family Tortricidae. It is found in Bolivia.
