= Clarkeulia excerptana =

Scientific classification
- Domain: Eukaryota
- Kingdom: Animalia
- Phylum: Arthropoda
- Class: Insecta
- Order: Lepidoptera
- Family: Tortricidae
- Genus: Clarkeulia
- Species: C. excerptana

Binomial name
- Clarkeulia excerptana (Walker, 1963)

Synonyms
- Teras excerptana Walker, 1963

Species of moth

Clarkeulia excerptana is a species of moth of the family Tortricidae. It is found in Brazil.
