= Transtillaspis papallactana =

Scientific classification
- Domain: Eukaryota
- Kingdom: Animalia
- Phylum: Arthropoda
- Class: Insecta
- Order: Lepidoptera
- Family: Tortricidae
- Genus: Transtillaspis
- Species: T. papallactana

Binomial name
- Transtillaspis papallactana Razowski & Wojtusiak, 2009

Species of moth

Transtillaspis papallactana is a species of moth of the family Tortricidae. It is found in Ecuador in the provinces of Napo and Tungurahua and in Peru.

The wingspan is about 21 mm.

== Etymology ==
The species name refers to Papallacta, the type locality.
