= Transtillaspis cosangana =

Scientific classification
- Domain: Eukaryota
- Kingdom: Animalia
- Phylum: Arthropoda
- Class: Insecta
- Order: Lepidoptera
- Family: Tortricidae
- Genus: Transtillaspis
- Species: T. cosangana

Binomial name
- Transtillaspis cosangana Razowski & Wojtusiak, 2009

Species of moth

Transtillaspis cosangana is a species of moth of the family Tortricidae. It is found in Napo Province, Ecuador.

The wingspan is about 17.5 mm.

== Etymology ==
The species name refers to Cosanga, the type locality.
