= Transtillaspis armifera =

Scientific classification
- Domain: Eukaryota
- Kingdom: Animalia
- Phylum: Arthropoda
- Class: Insecta
- Order: Lepidoptera
- Family: Tortricidae
- Genus: Transtillaspis
- Species: T. armifera

Binomial name
- Transtillaspis armifera Razowski & Wojtusiak, 2006

Species of moth

Transtillaspis armifera is a species of moth of the family Tortricidae. It is found in Venezuela.

The wingspan is about 26 mm.
