= Transtillaspis atheles =

Scientific classification
- Domain: Eukaryota
- Kingdom: Animalia
- Phylum: Arthropoda
- Class: Insecta
- Order: Lepidoptera
- Family: Tortricidae
- Genus: Transtillaspis
- Species: T. atheles

Binomial name
- Transtillaspis atheles Razowski & Wojtusiak, 2011

Species of moth

Transtillaspis atheles is a species of moth of the family Tortricidae. It is found in Colombia.

The wingspan is about 18 mm.
