= Clarkeulia radicana =

Scientific classification
- Kingdom: Animalia
- Phylum: Arthropoda
- Clade: Pancrustacea
- Class: Insecta
- Order: Lepidoptera
- Family: Tortricidae
- Genus: Clarkeulia
- Species: C. radicana

Binomial name
- Clarkeulia radicana (Zeller, 1877)

Synonyms
- Sciaphila radicana Zeller, 1877; Transtillaspis calderana Razowski & Wojtusiak, 2008

Species of moth

Clarkeulia radicana is a species of moth of the family Tortricidae. It is found in Colombia, Ecuador (Pichincha Province) and Peru.

The wingspan is 17.5 mm (0.69 in).
