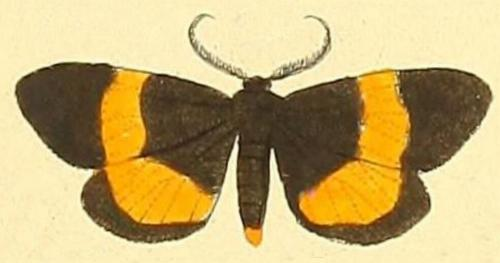
- Birthana cleis

Scientific classification
- Kingdom: Animalia
- Phylum: Arthropoda
- Class: Insecta
- Order: Lepidoptera
- Family: Immidae
- Genus: Birthana; Walker, [1865]

Synonyms
- Methypsa Butler, 1875; Hyperperissa Walsingham, 1900

= Birthana =

Genus of moths

Birthana is a genus of moths in the family Immidae.

== Species ==
- Birthana aristopa (Meyrick, 1925)
- Birthana asmenopa (Meyrick, 1925)
- Birthana aurantiaca (Semper, 1899)
- Birthana basiflava (Semper, 1899)
- Birthana bicolor (Hulstaert, 1924)
- Birthana cleis (Felder & Rogenhofer, 1875)
- Birthana consocia Walker, [1865]
- Birthana loxopis (Meyrick, 1909)
- Birthana saturata (Walker, 1864)
- Birthana taiwana Heppner, 1990

== Former species ==
- Birthana acribes (Durrant, 1916)
- Birthana caelestis (Meyrick, 1906)
- Birthana pulchella (Schultze, 1910)
