= Birthana saturata =

Scientific classification
- Kingdom: Animalia
- Phylum: Arthropoda
- Class: Insecta
- Order: Lepidoptera
- Family: Immidae
- Genus: Birthana
- Species: B. saturata

Binomial name
- Birthana saturata (Walker, 1864)

Synonyms
- Hypsa saturata Walker, 1864; Imma saturata

Species of moth

Birthana saturata is a moth in the family Immidae. It was described by Francis Walker in 1864. It is found on Java.

It is allied to, but quite distinct from Imma caelestis. Adults are larger, and the cilia of both wings are black. The hindwings are without the pale streaks, and have a bluish-white discoidal striga and triangular spots in the interspaces of the terminal area.
