= Zacorisca holantha =

Scientific classification
- Kingdom: Animalia
- Phylum: Arthropoda
- Class: Insecta
- Order: Lepidoptera
- Family: Tortricidae
- Genus: Zacorisca
- Species: Z. holantha

Binomial name
- Zacorisca holantha Meyrick, 1910

Species of moth

Zacorisca holantha is a species of moth of the family Tortricidae. It is found on New Guinea.

The wingspan is about 28 mm. The forewings are deep iridescent blue with a rather narrow deep coppery-red terminal fascia. The hindwings are blackish suffused with deep blue.
