= Birthana basiflava =

Scientific classification
- Domain: Eukaryota
- Kingdom: Animalia
- Phylum: Arthropoda
- Class: Insecta
- Order: Lepidoptera
- Family: Immidae
- Genus: Birthana
- Species: B. basiflava

Binomial name
- Birthana basiflava (Semper, 1899)

Synonyms
- Sidyma basiflava Semper, 1899

Species of moth

Birthana basiflava is a moth in the family Immidae. It was described by Georg Semper in 1899. It is found on Luzon in the Philippines.
