= Zacorisca thiasodes =

Scientific classification
- Kingdom: Animalia
- Phylum: Arthropoda
- Class: Insecta
- Order: Lepidoptera
- Family: Tortricidae
- Genus: Zacorisca
- Species: Z. thiasodes

Binomial name
- Zacorisca thiasodes (Meyrick, 1910)

Synonyms
- Atteria thiasodes Meyrick, 1910; Megalodoris lamprostola Durrant, 1915

Species of moth

Zacorisca thiasodes is a species of moth of the family Tortricidae. It is found on New Guinea.

The wingspan is 36–40 mm. The forewings are orange with bright deep purple-blue markings. The hindwings are blackish purple with a deep orange terminal fascia.
