= Bursadella =

Scientific classification
- Kingdom: Animalia
- Phylum: Arthropoda
- Class: Insecta
- Order: Lepidoptera
- Family: Immidae
- Genus: Bursadella; Snellen, 1880

Synonyms
- Scaptesylix Hampson, 1895; Dichrostoptera Hulstaert, 1924

Genus of moths

Bursadella is a genus of moths in the family Immidae.

== Species ==
- Bursadella acribes (Durrant, 1916)
- Bursadella dichroalis Snellen, 1880
- Bursadella endoneurias (Meyrick, 1925)
- Bursadella grammatistis (Meyrick, 1906)
- Bursadella grammozona (Meyrick, 1925)
- Bursadella mesolampra (Meyrick, 1927)
- Bursadella minatrix (Meyrick, 1906)
- Bursadella ramosa (Durrant, 1915)
- Bursadella timetica (Durrant, 1915)
- Bursadella tonans (Meyrick, 1925)
- Bursadella tyroplaca (Meyrick, 1925)
