= Zacorisca aglaocarpa =

Scientific classification
- Kingdom: Animalia
- Phylum: Arthropoda
- Class: Insecta
- Order: Lepidoptera
- Family: Tortricidae
- Genus: Zacorisca
- Species: Z. aglaocarpa

Binomial name
- Zacorisca aglaocarpa Meyrick, 1924

Synonyms
- Zacorisca opticodes Meyrick, 1927

Species of moth

Zacorisca aglaocarpa is a species of moth of the family Tortricidae. It is found on Seram Island in Indonesia and in India.

The moth's wingspan is about 37 mm.
