= Zacorisca heliaula =

Scientific classification
- Kingdom: Animalia
- Phylum: Arthropoda
- Class: Insecta
- Order: Lepidoptera
- Family: Tortricidae
- Genus: Zacorisca
- Species: Z. heliaula

Binomial name
- Zacorisca heliaula (Meyrick, 1910)

Synonyms
- Atteria heliaula Meyrick, 1910

Species of moth

Zacorisca heliaula is a species of moth of the family Tortricidae. It is found in the Philippines.

The wingspan is 28–29 mm. The forewings are orange, towards the apex broadly suffused with reddish. The hindwings are purple blackish with an orange apical patch.
