= Zacorisca electrina =

Scientific classification
- Kingdom: Animalia
- Phylum: Arthropoda
- Class: Insecta
- Order: Lepidoptera
- Family: Tortricidae
- Genus: Zacorisca
- Species: Z. electrina

Binomial name
- Zacorisca electrina (Meyrick, 1912)

Synonyms
- Megalodoris electrina Meyrick, 1912

Species of moth

Zacorisca electrina is a species of moth of the family Tortricidae. It is found on Mindanao in the Philippines.
