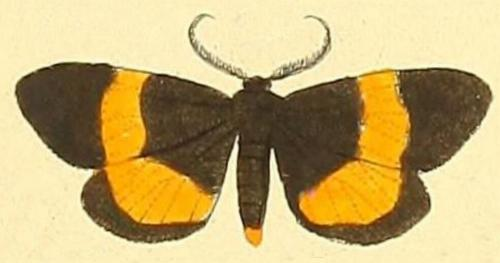

Scientific classification
- Domain: Eukaryota
- Kingdom: Animalia
- Phylum: Arthropoda
- Class: Insecta
- Order: Lepidoptera
- Family: Immidae
- Genus: Birthana
- Species: B. cleis

Binomial name
- Birthana cleis (C. Felder, R. Felder & Rogenhofer, 1875)

Synonyms
- Bursada cleis Felder & Rogenhofer, 1875; Imma cleis

= Birthana cleis =

Species of moth

Birthana cleis is a moth in the family Immidae. It was described by Cajetan Felder, Rudolf Felder and Alois Friedrich Rogenhofer in 1875. It is found on Ambon and in Australia, where it has been recorded from the Northern Territory, Queensland and New South Wales.

The wingspan is 30–34 mm. The forewings are blackish with an orange fascia from the mid-costa to the dorsum before the tornus, outwardly oblique and slightly curved. The hindwings are broader than the forewings. They are blackish with a broad orange median fascia.

The larvae have been found feeding gregariously on the foliage of Decaisnina signata. Pupation takes place on a leaf in a circular communal cocoon.
