= Birthana consocia =

Scientific classification
- Kingdom: Animalia
- Phylum: Arthropoda
- Class: Insecta
- Order: Lepidoptera
- Family: Immidae
- Genus: Birthana
- Species: B. consocia

Binomial name
- Birthana consocia Walker, [1865]

Species of moth

Birthana consocia is a moth in the family Immidae. It was described by Francis Walker in 1865. It is found on the Moluccas.

Adults are blackish brown, the forewings with a broad luteous (muddy-yellow) band extending from much beyond half the length of the costa to the end of the interior border.
