= Zacorisca daphnaea =

Scientific classification
- Kingdom: Animalia
- Phylum: Arthropoda
- Class: Insecta
- Order: Lepidoptera
- Family: Tortricidae
- Genus: Zacorisca
- Species: Z. daphnaea

Binomial name
- Zacorisca daphnaea (Meyrick, 1924)

Synonyms
- Chresmarcha daphnaea Meyrick, 1924

Species of moth

Zacorisca daphnaea is a species of moth of the family Tortricidae. It is found on New Guinea.

The wingspan is 22–30 mm. The forewings are bluish white with a fine dark blue line round the base and basal portions of the costa and dorsum. There is a deep coppery-ferruginous apical patch. The hindwings are dark purple fuscous or dark grey.
