= Bursadella grammatistis =

Scientific classification
- Kingdom: Animalia
- Phylum: Arthropoda
- Class: Insecta
- Order: Lepidoptera
- Family: Immidae
- Genus: Bursadella
- Species: B. grammatistis

Binomial name
- Bursadella grammatistis (Meyrick, 1906)

Synonyms
- Imma grammatistis Meyrick, 1906

Species of moth

Bursadella grammatistis is a moth in the family Immidae. It was described by Edward Meyrick in 1906. It is found on New Guinea.

The wingspan is about 33 mm. The forewings are dark fuscous with ochreous-white markings. There is a streak beneath the costa from the base to two-fifths and a fine dorsal streak from near the base to near the tornus. All veins are marked by strong streaks, not quite reaching the margin, posteriorly terminating in a curved submarginal streak which is broadest opposite the apex. A violet-metallic line is found along the termen. The hindwings are dark fuscous, lighter towards the base. There is also a suffused whitish streak along the upper half of the termen.
