= Zacorisca helictocestum =

Scientific classification
- Kingdom: Animalia
- Phylum: Arthropoda
- Class: Insecta
- Order: Lepidoptera
- Family: Tortricidae
- Genus: Zacorisca
- Species: Z. helictocestum

Binomial name
- Zacorisca helictocestum Razowski, 2013

Species of moth

Zacorisca helictocestum is a species of moth of the family Tortricidae first described by Józef Razowski in 2013. It is found on Seram Island of Indonesia. The habitat consists of lower montane forests.

The wingspan is about 32 mm.

== Etymology ==
The specific name refers to the shape of the cestum and is derived from Greek helictos (meaning coiled).
