= Zacorisca sibyllina =

Scientific classification
- Kingdom: Animalia
- Phylum: Arthropoda
- Class: Insecta
- Order: Lepidoptera
- Family: Tortricidae
- Genus: Zacorisca
- Species: Z. sibyllina

Binomial name
- Zacorisca sibyllina (Meyrick, 1910)

Synonyms
- Chresmarcha sibyllina Meyrick, 1910

Species of moth

Zacorisca sibyllina is a species of moth of the family Tortricidae. It is found on New Guinea.

The wingspan is about 18 mm. The forewings are silvery white with a black costal edge and some pale yellowish suffusion towards the apex. The hindwings are dark grey, darker towards the apex.
