= Birthana asmenopa =

Scientific classification
- Kingdom: Animalia
- Phylum: Arthropoda
- Class: Insecta
- Order: Lepidoptera
- Family: Immidae
- Genus: Birthana
- Species: B. asmenopa

Binomial name
- Birthana asmenopa (Meyrick, 1925)

Synonyms
- Imma asmenopa Meyrick, 1925

Species of moth

Birthana asmenopa is a moth in the family Immidae. It was described by Edward Meyrick in 1925. It is found in New Guinea.

The wingspan is about 30 mm. The forewings are purple-blackish with a gently curved rather broad even deep orange fascia from the middle of the costa to three-fourths of the dorsum. There is a leaden-blue terminal line. The hindwings are blackish with a broad slightly curved transverse orange band occupying from before the middle to five-sixths of the wing, the anterior edge rather irregular.
