= Bursadella dichroalis =

Scientific classification
- Kingdom: Animalia
- Phylum: Arthropoda
- Class: Insecta
- Order: Lepidoptera
- Family: Immidae
- Genus: Bursadella
- Species: B. dichroalis

Binomial name
- Bursadella dichroalis Snellen, 1880

Synonyms
- Scaptesylix hemichryseis Hampson, 1895

Species of moth

Bursadella dichroalis is a moth in the family Immidae. It was described by Snellen in 1880. It is found in Burma and on Sumatra.

The wingspan is about 20 mm. Adults are bright golden yellow, the forewings with the outer half black suffused with purple and with a postmedial yellow spot on the costa, its inner edge slightly angled outwards at lower end of the cell. The hindwings have the outer area black, broad at the costa, tapering to the anal angle.
