= Bursadella timetica =

Scientific classification
- Domain: Eukaryota
- Kingdom: Animalia
- Phylum: Arthropoda
- Class: Insecta
- Order: Lepidoptera
- Family: Immidae
- Genus: Bursadella
- Species: B. timetica

Binomial name
- Bursadella timetica (Durrant, 1915)

Synonyms
- Imma timetica Durrant, 1915; Dichrostoptera basilinea Hulstaert, 1924

Species of moth

Bursadella timetica is a moth in the family Immidae. It was described by John Hartley Durrant in 1915. It is found on New Guinea.
