= Birthana loxopis =

Scientific classification
- Kingdom: Animalia
- Phylum: Arthropoda
- Class: Insecta
- Order: Lepidoptera
- Family: Immidae
- Genus: Birthana
- Species: B. loxopis

Binomial name
- Birthana loxopis (Meyrick, 1909)

Synonyms
- Imma loxopis Meyrick, 1909

Species of moth

Birthana loxopis is a moth in the family Immidae. It was described by Edward Meyrick in 1909. It is found in Assam, India.

The wingspan is about 30 mm. The forewings are dark purplish fuscous with a narrow irregular orange basal fascia enclosing two small dark fuscous spots. From this fascia rise seven longitudinal yellow-whitish lines on the veins and the dorsum, reaching mostly to about the middle. There is an oblique transverse rather narrow ochreous-white blotch in the disc beyond the middle. The hindwings are dark fuscous with a slight orange median dash near the base and an orange subdorsal streak from near the base to beyond the middle.
