= Zacorisca poecilantha =

Scientific classification
- Kingdom: Animalia
- Phylum: Arthropoda
- Class: Insecta
- Order: Lepidoptera
- Family: Tortricidae
- Genus: Zacorisca
- Species: Z. poecilantha

Binomial name
- Zacorisca poecilantha Meyrick, 1924

Species of moth

Zacorisca poecilantha is a species of moth of the family Tortricidae. It is found on the Maluku Islands of Indonesia, where it has been recorded from Buru.

The wingspan is about 28 mm.
