= Bursadella mesolampra =

Scientific classification
- Kingdom: Animalia
- Phylum: Arthropoda
- Class: Insecta
- Order: Lepidoptera
- Family: Immidae
- Genus: Bursadella
- Species: B. mesolampra

Binomial name
- Bursadella mesolampra (Meyrick, 1927)

Synonyms
- Imma mesolampra Meyrick, 1927

Species of moth

Bursadella mesolampra is a moth in the family Immidae. It was described by Edward Meyrick in 1927. It is found in New Guinea, where it is found in the Weyland Mountains and Paniai Lakes area.

The wingspan is about 34 mm. The forewings are blackish with a subcostal line on the anterior half and all veins marked with orange lines, an orange suffused fasciate blotch crossing the middle of the wing rather obliquely from 1c to 11. There is an orange terminal line. The hindwings are blackish.
