= Zacorisca chrysomelopa =

Scientific classification
- Kingdom: Animalia
- Phylum: Arthropoda
- Class: Insecta
- Order: Lepidoptera
- Family: Tortricidae
- Genus: Zacorisca
- Species: Z. chrysomelopa

Binomial name
- Zacorisca chrysomelopa Meyrick, 1927

Species of moth

Zacorisca chrysomelopa is a species of moth of the family Tortricidae. It is found in New Zealand.
