= Zacorisca euthalama =

Scientific classification
- Kingdom: Animalia
- Phylum: Arthropoda
- Class: Insecta
- Order: Lepidoptera
- Family: Tortricidae
- Genus: Zacorisca
- Species: Z. euthalama

Binomial name
- Zacorisca euthalama Meyrick, 1924

Species of moth

Zacorisca euthalama is a species of moth of the family Tortricidae. It is found on Seram Island of Indonesia.

The wingspan is 30–32 mm.
