= Zacorisca leura =

Scientific classification
- Kingdom: Animalia
- Phylum: Arthropoda
- Class: Insecta
- Order: Lepidoptera
- Family: Tortricidae
- Genus: Zacorisca
- Species: Z. leura

Binomial name
- Zacorisca leura Razowski, 2013

Species of moth

Zacorisca leura is a species of moth of the family Tortricidae first described by Józef Razowski in 2013. It is found on Seram Island of Indonesia. The habitat consists of upper montane forests.

The wingspan is about 32 mm.

== Etymology ==
The specific name refers to the colouration of the forewings and is derived from Greek leuros (meaning smooth).
