= Bursadella minatrix =

Scientific classification
- Kingdom: Animalia
- Phylum: Arthropoda
- Class: Insecta
- Order: Lepidoptera
- Family: Immidae
- Genus: Bursadella
- Species: B. minatrix

Binomial name
- Bursadella minatrix (Meyrick, 1906)

Synonyms
- Imma minatrix Meyrick, 1906; Imma memorata Durrant; Imma minax Durrant

Species of moth

Bursadella minatrix is a moth in the family Immidae. It was described by Edward Meyrick in 1906. It is widely distributed on New Guinea.

The wingspan is 33–36 mm. The forewings are yellow orange with purple-blackish markings. There is a costal streak from base, terminating in a patch which occupies the apical two-fifths of the wing beyond a curved line from the middle of the costa to the dorsum before the tornus, except a curved ante-apical fascia of ground colour from near the costa at three-fourths to near the termen above the tornus. A subcostal streak is found from the base, sometimes reaching the posterior patch. The median and submedian streaks run from the base to near the middle, the median basally confluent with the subcostal. There is a dorsal streak from the base to two-thirds attenuated at the base. The hindwings are blackish fuscous, the centre of the disc purple blackish. There is also an ante-apical yellow-orange fascia, attenuated downwards to the termen below the middle.
