= Zacorisca platyantha =

Scientific classification
- Kingdom: Animalia
- Phylum: Arthropoda
- Class: Insecta
- Order: Lepidoptera
- Family: Tortricidae
- Genus: Zacorisca
- Species: Z. platyantha

Binomial name
- Zacorisca platyantha Meyrick, 1924

Species of moth

Zacorisca platyantha is a species of moth of the family Tortricidae. It is found on the Moluccas, where it has been recorded from Buru.

The wingspan is 27–32 mm. The forewings are blue-blackish, with a large yellowish-white or light yellow trapezoidal patch extending along the dorsum from near the base. The hindwings are purple-blackish.
