= Zacorisca =

Scientific classification
- Domain: Eukaryota
- Kingdom: Animalia
- Phylum: Arthropoda
- Class: Insecta
- Order: Lepidoptera
- Family: Tortricidae
- Tribe: Archipini
- Genus: Zacorisca; Meyrick, 1910

Synonyms
- Chresmarcha Meyrick, 1910; Megalodoris Meyrick, 1912

Genus of tortrix moths

Zacorisca is a genus of moths belonging to the subfamily Tortricinae of the family Tortricidae.

== Species ==
- Zacorisca aglaocarpa Meyrick, 1924
- Zacorisca angi Diakonoff, 1952
- Zacorisca aptycha Diakonoff, 1952
- Zacorisca aquamarina Diakonoff, 1952
- Zacorisca basilica Diakonoff, 1952
- Zacorisca bovisanguis Diakonoff, 1952
- Zacorisca chrysomelopa Meyrick, 1927
- Zacorisca cyprantha Meyrick, 1924
- Zacorisca daphnaea (Meyrick, 1924)
- Zacorisca delphica (Meyrick, 1910)
- Zacorisca digna Razowski, 2013
- Zacorisca electrina (Meyrick, 1912)
- Zacorisca enaemargyrea (Diakonoff, 1952)
- Zacorisca epacmochroma Diakonoff, 1983
- Zacorisca erythromis Meyrick, 1924
- Zacorisca euthalama Meyrick, 1924
- Zacorisca heliaula (Meyrick, 1910)
- Zacorisca helictocestum Razowski, 2013
- Zacorisca helminthophora Diakonoff, 1948
- Zacorisca holantha Meyrick, 1910
- Zacorisca leura Razowski, 2013
- Zacorisca phaeoxesta Meyrick, 1924
- Zacorisca platyantha Meyrick, 1924
- Zacorisca poecilantha Meyrick, 1924
- Zacorisca pulchella (Schultze, 1910)
- Zacorisca pyrocanthara Meyrick, 1924
- Zacorisca seramica Razowski, 2013
- Zacorisca sibyllina (Meyrick, 1910)
- Zacorisca stephanitis (Meyrick, 1910)
- Zacorisca taminia (Felder & Rogenhofer, 1875)
- Zacorisca tetrachroma Diakonoff, 1944
- Zacorisca thiasodes (Meyrick, 1910)
- Zacorisca toxopei Diakonoff, 1948
- Zacorisca vexillifera Meyrick, 1924

== See also ==
- List of Tortricidae genera
