= Zacorisca toxopei =

Scientific classification
- Domain: Eukaryota
- Kingdom: Animalia
- Phylum: Arthropoda
- Class: Insecta
- Order: Lepidoptera
- Family: Tortricidae
- Genus: Zacorisca
- Species: Z. toxopei

Binomial name
- Zacorisca toxopei Diakonoff, 1948

Species of moth

Zacorisca toxopei is a species of moth of the family Tortricidae. It is found on New Guinea and Borneo.

== Subspecies ==
- Zacorisca toxopei toxopei
- Zacorisca toxopei aplasta Diakonoff, 1948 (Borneo)
