= Zacorisca taminia =

Scientific classification
- Domain: Eukaryota
- Kingdom: Animalia
- Phylum: Arthropoda
- Class: Insecta
- Order: Lepidoptera
- Family: Tortricidae
- Genus: Zacorisca
- Species: Z. taminia

Binomial name
- Zacorisca taminia (Felder & Rogenhofer, 1875)

Synonyms
- Dichromia taminia Felder & Rogenhofer, 1875

Species of moth

Zacorisca taminia is a species of moth of the family Tortricidae. It is found on Java in Indonesia.
