= Bursadella grammozona =

Scientific classification
- Kingdom: Animalia
- Phylum: Arthropoda
- Class: Insecta
- Order: Lepidoptera
- Family: Immidae
- Genus: Bursadella
- Species: B. grammozona

Binomial name
- Bursadella grammozona (Meyrick, 1925)

Synonyms
- Imma grammozona Meyrick, 1925

Species of moth

Bursadella grammozona is a moth in the family Immidae. It was described by Edward Meyrick in 1925. It is found in New Guinea.

The wingspan is 27–34 mm. The forewings are orange to orange-whitish, with black markings. There is a line around the costa and termen, on the termen including a leaden marginal line. There is a streak from the base of the dorsum just above the dorsum to the tornus and interneural streaks from the base above 1b and beneath the cell to about the middle of the wing, one above 12 seldom reaching the costa, one above the cell and 11 seldom reaching the costa, and a streak within the cell disconnected or rising out of the preceding, not reaching a mark on the upper part of the transverse vein. A fasciate band of interneural streaks is found between veins 2 and 11 diminishing downwards to the tornus and terminated by a short mark beneath 2, not reaching the margin but leaving a narrow fascia of ground colour widest opposite the apex. The hindwings are blackish with an orange marginal fascia around the apex and upper part of the termen to near the middle, variable in width but widest above and narrowed to a point beneath, enclosing a short black streak on the apical edge, sometimes very small.
