= Zacorisca stephanitis =

Scientific classification
- Kingdom: Animalia
- Phylum: Arthropoda
- Class: Insecta
- Order: Lepidoptera
- Family: Tortricidae
- Genus: Zacorisca
- Species: Z. stephanitis

Binomial name
- Zacorisca stephanitis (Meyrick, 1910)

Synonyms
- Atteria stephanitis Meyrick, 1910

Species of moth

Zacorisca stephanitis is a species of moth of the family Tortricidae. It is found on Flores in Indonesia.

The wingspan is 30–32 mm. The forewings are bright orange, but blue blackish at the base. The hindwings are bright orange with a purple-blackish streak along the dorsum. The apical fifth is purple blackish.
