= Zacorisca delphica =

Scientific classification
- Kingdom: Animalia
- Phylum: Arthropoda
- Class: Insecta
- Order: Lepidoptera
- Family: Tortricidae
- Genus: Zacorisca
- Species: Z. delphica

Binomial name
- Zacorisca delphica (Meyrick, 1910)

Synonyms
- Chresmarcha delphica Meyrick, 1910

Species of moth

Zacorisca delphica is a species of moth of the family Tortricidae. It is found on New Guinea.

The wingspan is about 21 mm. The forewings are silvery white with a black costal edge and with a series of irregular black marks. The hindwings are yellowish white with a moderate suffused dark grey streak along the upper half of the termen.
