= Birthana aristopa =

Scientific classification
- Kingdom: Animalia
- Phylum: Arthropoda
- Class: Insecta
- Order: Lepidoptera
- Family: Immidae
- Genus: Birthana
- Species: B. aristopa

Binomial name
- Birthana aristopa (Meyrick, 1925)

Synonyms
- Imma aristopa Meyrick, 1925

Species of moth

Birthana aristopa is a moth in the family Immidae. It was described by Edward Meyrick in 1925. It is found on Rossel Island in New Guinea.

The wingspan is 30–32 mm. The forewings are blackish with a broad curved even orange fascia from the middle of the costa to the dorsum before the tornus and a pale leaden-blue terminal line. The hindwings are blackish with a rather broader slightly curved transverse orange band occupying from before the middle to five-sixths.
