= Zacorisca pyrocanthara =

Scientific classification
- Kingdom: Animalia
- Phylum: Arthropoda
- Class: Insecta
- Order: Lepidoptera
- Family: Tortricidae
- Genus: Zacorisca
- Species: Z. pyrocanthara

Binomial name
- Zacorisca pyrocanthara Meyrick, 1924

Species of moth

Zacorisca pyrocanthara is a species of moth of the family Tortricidae. It is found on New Guinea.

The wingspan is about 35 mm.
