= Zacorisca phaeoxesta =

Scientific classification
- Kingdom: Animalia
- Phylum: Arthropoda
- Class: Insecta
- Order: Lepidoptera
- Family: Tortricidae
- Genus: Zacorisca
- Species: Z. phaeoxesta

Binomial name
- Zacorisca phaeoxesta Meyrick, 1924

Species of moth

Zacorisca phaeoxesta is a species of moth of the family Tortricidae. It is found on New Guinea and on Seram.

The wingspan is 30–34 mm. The forewings are brownish grey, greyish ochreous or brownish ochreous with a short dark blue mark on the base of the dorsum and a broad whitish-yellow or ochreous-white costal streak. The hindwings are dark brown grey, but browner posteriorly.
