= Bursadella endoneurias =

Scientific classification
- Kingdom: Animalia
- Phylum: Arthropoda
- Class: Insecta
- Order: Lepidoptera
- Family: Immidae
- Genus: Bursadella
- Species: B. endoneurias

Binomial name
- Bursadella endoneurias (Meyrick, 1925)

Synonyms
- Imma endoneurias Meyrick, 1925

Species of moth

Bursadella endoneurias is a moth in the family Immidae. It was described by Edward Meyrick in 1925. It is found on Roon Island in New Guinea.

The wingspan is 33–34 mm. The forewings are light ochreous-yellow with a slender black costal streak, becoming stronger around the termen and including a leaden-metallic terminal line, a subdorsal black streak from near the base running into the end of this. There are black interneural streaks above 1b, beneath the cell and 2, within the cell, above 12 running into the costa, and between 2–12, all these (except the last preceding) not reaching the margin, posteriorly terminated in an even curve and leaving a narrow rather yellower subterminal fascia widest opposite the apex. The hindwings are blackish.
