= Zacorisca digna =

Scientific classification
- Kingdom: Animalia
- Phylum: Arthropoda
- Class: Insecta
- Order: Lepidoptera
- Family: Tortricidae
- Genus: Zacorisca
- Species: Z. digna

Binomial name
- Zacorisca digna Razowski, 2013

Species of moth

Zacorisca digna is a species of moth of the family Tortricidae first described by Józef Razowski in 2013. It is found on Seram Island in Indonesia. The habitat consists of upper montane forests.

The wingspan is about 34 mm.
