= Zacorisca seramica =

Scientific classification
- Kingdom: Animalia
- Phylum: Arthropoda
- Class: Insecta
- Order: Lepidoptera
- Family: Tortricidae
- Genus: Zacorisca
- Species: Z. seramica

Binomial name
- Zacorisca seramica Razowski, 2013

Species of moth

Zacorisca seramica is a species of moth of the family Tortricidae first described by Józef Razowski in 2013. It is found on Seram Island in Indonesia. The habitat consists of lower montane forests.

The wingspan is about 30 mm.
