= Bursadella tonans =

Scientific classification
- Kingdom: Animalia
- Phylum: Arthropoda
- Class: Insecta
- Order: Lepidoptera
- Family: Immidae
- Genus: Bursadella
- Species: B. tonans

Binomial name
- Bursadella tonans (Meyrick, 1925)

Synonyms
- Imma tonans Meyrick, 1925

Species of moth

Bursadella tonans is a moth in the family Immidae. It was described by Edward Meyrick in 1925. It is found in New Guinea.

== Appearance ==
The wingspan is 32–36 mm. The forewings are ochreous yellow, with purple-black markings.

There is a costal streak to the apical patch, and dorsal streak to about three-fourths. There is also a basal mark from which rise streaks above and below the cell diverging from a point and not reaching the middle, and a streak below the fold parallel to the lower of these. A large apical patch, the edge rather concave and running from the middle of the costa to the tornus, encloses a subcrescentic transverse ochreous-yellow streak before the apex.

The hindwings are black with a curved ochreous-yellow fascia from the costa posteriorly to near the middle of the termen, widest on the costa and narrowed to a point beneath, leaving a black marginal streak around the apex and termen.
