= Zacorisca erythromis =

Scientific classification
- Kingdom: Animalia
- Phylum: Arthropoda
- Class: Insecta
- Order: Lepidoptera
- Family: Tortricidae
- Genus: Zacorisca
- Species: Z. erythromis

Binomial name
- Zacorisca erythromis Meyrick, 1924

Species of moth

Zacorisca erythromis is a species of moth of the family Tortricidae. It is found in the Maluku Islands of Indonesia, where it has been recorded from Buru.

The wingspan is 27–29 mm.
