= Birthana taiwana =

Scientific classification
- Kingdom: Animalia
- Phylum: Arthropoda
- Clade: Pancrustacea
- Class: Insecta
- Order: Lepidoptera
- Family: Immidae
- Genus: Birthana
- Species: B. taiwana

Binomial name
- Birthana taiwana Heppner, 1990

Species of moth

Birthana taiwana is a moth in the family Immidae. It was described by John B. Heppner in 1990. It is found in Taiwan.
