= Bursadella tyroplaca =

Scientific classification
- Kingdom: Animalia
- Phylum: Arthropoda
- Class: Insecta
- Order: Lepidoptera
- Family: Immidae
- Genus: Bursadella
- Species: B. tyroplaca

Binomial name
- Bursadella tyroplaca (Meyrick, 1925)

Synonyms
- Imma tyroplaca Meyrick, 1925

Species of moth

Bursadella tyroplaca is a moth in the family Immidae. It was described by Edward Meyrick in 1925. It is found in New Guinea.

The wingspan is about 36 mm. The forewings are ochreous-yellow with a blackish costal line and a blackish line from the base above the middle to near one-third. The hindwings are blackish with a slender ochreous-yellow streak around the apex and upper two-thirds of the termen, broken into spots below the apex.
