= Zacorisca vexillifera =

Scientific classification
- Kingdom: Animalia
- Phylum: Arthropoda
- Class: Insecta
- Order: Lepidoptera
- Family: Tortricidae
- Genus: Zacorisca
- Species: Z. vexillifera

Binomial name
- Zacorisca vexillifera Meyrick, 1924

Species of moth

Zacorisca vexillifera is a species of moth of the family Tortricidae. It is found in New Guinea.

The wingspan is 26–28 mm.
