= Bursadella acribes =

Scientific classification
- Domain: Eukaryota
- Kingdom: Animalia
- Phylum: Arthropoda
- Class: Insecta
- Order: Lepidoptera
- Family: Immidae
- Genus: Bursadella
- Species: B. acribes

Binomial name
- Bursadella acribes (Durrant, 1916)

Synonyms
- Imma acribes Durrant, 1916

Species of moth

Bursadella acribes is a moth in the family Immidae. It was described by John Hartley Durrant in 1916. It is only known from Biak.

The wingspan is about 34 mm. The forewings are orange ochreous, the interneural spaces strongly marked with black, causing the neuration to appear conspicuously in lines of the orange ground colour, except toward the costa and termen where the ground colour forms a subterminal band obliterating the black streaks, with the exception of the two preceding veins 11 and 12 which extend to the costa. The black streak between veins 5-6 differs from the others in widening inwardly, ending with a lunate expansion on the discoidal and is not connected with the black discal streak. The costa and termen are narrowly margined with black, the termen with a narrow lilac-grey line at the base of the dark fuscous cilia. The underside is pale orange ochreous, the costa and termen margined with dark fuscous, with some blackish interneural shading. The hindwings are orange ochreous, with a broad black basal patch, and narrowly black at the apex and along the termen. The black basal patch extends to beyond the cell and is irregular in outline, having four or five tooth-like extensions along the veins.
