= Zacorisca pulchella =

Scientific classification
- Domain: Eukaryota
- Kingdom: Animalia
- Phylum: Arthropoda
- Class: Insecta
- Order: Lepidoptera
- Family: Tortricidae
- Genus: Zacorisca
- Species: Z. pulchella

Binomial name
- Zacorisca pulchella (Schultze, 1910)

Synonyms
- Hyperperissa pulchella Schultze, 1910

Species of moth

Zacorisca pulchella is a species of moth of the family Tortricidae. It is found in the Philippines on the islands of Luzon and Panai.

The length of the forewings is about 9 mm. There is a dark metallic-blue streak at the base and the apical third of the forewings. The apical part of the hindwings is dark metallic blue.
