= Imma caelestis =

Scientific classification
- Kingdom: Animalia
- Phylum: Arthropoda
- Class: Insecta
- Order: Lepidoptera
- Family: Immidae
- Genus: Imma
- Species: I. caelestis

Binomial name
- Imma caelestis Meyrick, 1906

Synonyms
- Birthana caelestis

Species of moth

Imma caelestis is a moth in the family Immidae. It was described by Edward Meyrick in 1906. It is found in western China.

The wingspan is 36–38 mm. The forewings are purple blackish with the costal edge ochreous whitish except towards the extremities. There is an irregular orange basal spot not reaching the margins, connected by an irregular mark with the dorsum near the base. The veins are more or less marked by whitish-yellowish lines edged with a pale bluish tinge, not reaching the margins, the broadest on 1b and the lower and posterior margins of the cell, partially or quite obsolete on veins 2, 5, 6, and 9. A similar dorsal streak is found from one-fourth to beyond the middle. The hindwings are blackish fuscous, lighter towards the base and with a pale orange median dash from the base and an orange subdorsal streak, not quite reaching the termen.
